= List of municipalities of the Province of Asti =

The following is a list of the 117 municipalities (comuni) of the Province of Asti in the region of Piedmont in Italy.

== List ==
Municipality	Population (2026)	Area (km^{2})	Density
Agliano Terme	1,545	15.45	100.0
Albugnano	525	9.54	55.0
Antignano	957	10.86	88.1
Aramengo	574	11.41	50.3
Asti	73,604	151.31	486.4
Azzano d'Asti	383	6.43	59.6
Baldichieri d'Asti	1,104	5.07	217.8
Belveglio	292	5.28	55.3
Berzano di San Pietro	404	7.34	55.0
Bruno	305	8.90	34.3
Bubbio	793	15.76	50.3
Buttigliera d'Asti	2,505	19.16	130.7
Calamandrana	1,643	12.79	128.5
Calliano	1,235	17.29	71.4
Calosso	1,102	15.72	70.1
Camerano Casasco	421	6.89	61.1
Canelli	10,014	23.43	427.4
Cantarana	974	9.72	100.2
Capriglio	295	5.06	58.3
Casorzo	581	12.65	45.9
Cassinasco	559	11.84	47.2
Castagnole delle Lanze	3,660	21.57	169.7
Castagnole Monferrato	1,129	17.34	65.1
Castel Boglione	591	11.86	49.8
Castel Rocchero	356	5.63	63.2
Castell'Alfero	2,588	20.09	128.8
Castellero	281	4.29	65.5
Castelletto Molina	137	3.07	44.6
Castello di Annone	1,827	23.18	78.8
Castelnuovo Belbo	815	9.55	85.3
Castelnuovo Calcea	680	8.20	82.9
Castelnuovo Don Bosco	3,095	21.61	143.2
Cellarengo	731	10.85	67.4
Celle Enomondo	430	5.59	76.9
Cerreto d'Asti	217	4.82	45.0
Cerro Tanaro	594	4.65	127.7
Cessole	327	11.78	27.8
Chiusano d'Asti	242	2.42	100.0
Cinaglio	404	5.50	73.5
Cisterna d'Asti	1,221	10.73	113.8
Coazzolo	285	4.05	70.4
Cocconato	1,415	16.52	85.7
Corsione	191	5.08	37.6
Cortandone	307	5.02	61.2
Cortanze	262	4.48	58.5
Cortazzone	596	10.33	57.7
Cortiglione	507	8.43	60.1
Cossombrato	506	5.40	93.7
Costigliole d'Asti	5,664	36.94	153.3
Cunico	427	6.75	63.3
Dusino San Michele	1,081	11.93	90.6
Ferrere	1,511	13.93	108.5
Fontanile	473	8.13	58.2
Frinco	722	7.22	100.0
Grana	507	5.89	86.1
Grazzano Badoglio	511	10.47	48.8
Incisa Scapaccino	2,006	20.70	96.9
Isola d'Asti	1,897	13.50	140.5
Loazzolo	296	14.82	20.0
Maranzana	204	4.37	46.7
Maretto	370	4.93	75.1
Moasca	522	4.16	125.5
Mombaldone	190	11.96	15.9
Mombaruzzo	892	22.40	39.8
Mombercelli	2,038	14.23	143.2
Monale	990	9.11	108.7
Monastero Bormida	820	14.21	57.7
Moncalvo	2,762	17.42	158.6
Moncucco Torinese	869	14.33	60.6
Mongardino	834	6.86	121.6
Montabone	301	8.54	35.2
Montafia	932	14.50	64.3
Montaldo Scarampi	708	6.63	106.8
Montechiaro d'Asti	1,221	10.14	120.4
Montegrosso d'Asti	2,320	15.42	150.5
Montemagno	1,030	16.10	64.0
Montiglio Monferrato	1,497	26.86	55.7
Moransengo-Tonengo	420	11.01	38.1
Nizza Monferrato	10,168	30.36	334.9
Olmo Gentile	67	5.62	11.9
Passerano Marmorito	446	12.03	37.1
Penango	417	9.56	43.6
Piea	489	9.00	54.3
Pino d'Asti	217	4.08	53.2
Piovà Massaia	557	10.14	54.9
Portacomaro	1,891	11.00	171.9
Quaranti	144	2.86	50.3
Refrancore	1,535	13.21	116.2
Revigliasco d'Asti	752	8.84	85.1
Roatto	350	6.42	54.5
Robella	440	12.18	36.1
Rocca d'Arazzo	935	12.56	74.4
Roccaverano	360	29.98	12.0
Rocchetta Palafea	320	7.84	40.8
Rocchetta Tanaro	1,357	15.91	85.3
San Damiano d'Asti	8,040	47.87	168.0
San Giorgio Scarampi	98	6.15	15.9
San Martino Alfieri	661	7.21	91.7
San Marzano Oliveto	930	9.68	96.1
San Paolo Solbrito	1,163	11.87	98.0
Scurzolengo	522	5.34	97.8
Serole	96	12.33	7.8
Sessame	222	8.45	26.3
Settime	531	6.68	79.5
Soglio	128	3.28	39.0
Tigliole	1,739	16.12	107.9
Tonco	762	11.78	64.7
Vaglio Serra	260	4.76	54.6
Valfenera	2,445	22.04	110.9
Vesime	582	13.17	44.2
Viale	227	3.98	57.0
Viarigi	807	13.62	59.3
Vigliano d'Asti	792	6.65	119.1
Villa San Secondo	388	6.13	63.3
Villafranca d'Asti	2,959	12.88	229.7
Villanova d'Asti	5,507	41.95	131.3
Vinchio	531	9.29	57.2

== See also ==
- List of municipalities of Piedmont
- List of municipalities of Italy
