= List of parishes of the Roman Catholic Diocese of Asti =

List of parishes by province and commune for the Roman Catholic Diocese of Asti.

== List of parishes for the Roman Catholic Diocese of Asti ==
=== Province of Alessandria ===
Masio
Regina degli Apostoli
S. Maria Maddalena
Quattordio
S. Pietro

=== Province of Asti ===
Agliano Terme
S. Giacomo Maggiore
Albugnano
S. Giacomo Maggiore
Antignano
S. Stefano
Asti
Beata Vergine degli Angeli
Maria Ausiliatrice
Natività di Maria Vergine
Nostra Signora Assunta
Nostra Signora di Lourdes
S. Antonio Abate
S. Carlo
S. Caterina
S. Domenico Savio
S. Giacomo
S. Giovanni Battista
S. Giovanni Bosco
S. Maria Assunta
S. Maria De Horticis
S. Maria Nuova
S. Martino
S. Martino
S. Marziano
S. Michele Arcangelo
S. Paolo
S. Pietro
S. Pietro
S. Pietro
S. Secondo
S. Silvestro
S. Stefano
Sacro Cuore
Santi Marcello e Defendente
Santi Pietro e Paolo
SS. Annunziata
Azzano d’Asti
S. Giacomo Apostolo
Baldichieri d’Asti
S. Secondo
Belveglio
Natività di Maria
Calosso
Cuore Immacolato di Maria
S. Martino
Camerano Casasco
Santi Lorenzo e Paolo
Cantarana
S. Giovanni Battista
Capriglio
S. Martino
Castagnole Monferrato
S. Martino
Castellero
S. Pietro in Vincoli
Castello di Annone
S. Maria delle Ghiare
Santi Pietro e Stefano
Castell’Alfero
Santi Pietro e Paolo
SS. Annunziata
Castelnuovo Calcea
S. Stefano
Castelnuovo Don Bosco
Santi Maria e Domenico Savio
Cellarengo
S. Giovanni Battista
Celle Enomondo
S. Antonio Abate
Cerreto d’Asti
S. Andrea
Cerro Tanaro
S. Giovanni Battista
Chiusano d’Asti
S. Maria
Cinaglio
S. Felice
Cisterna d’Asti
S. Matteo
Santi Gervasio e Protasio
Corsione
S. Cristoforo
Cortandone
S. Antonio Abate
Cortanze
Santi Pietro e Giovanni
Cortazzone
S. Secondo
Cossombrato
S. Stefano
Costigliole d’Asti
Beata Vergine delle Grazie
Madonna di Loreto e S. Grato
Nostra Donna di Loreto
S. Anna
S. Francesco di Sales
S. Margherita
S. Michele Arcangelo
S. Siro
SS. Annunziata
Cunico
S. Maria della Valle
Dusino San Michele
Santi Rocco e Michele
Ferrere
S. Secondo
Frinco
Natività di Maria Vergine
Isola d’Asti
Beata Vergine Assunta
S. Caterina
S. Pietro
Maretto
Santi Maria e Michele
Mombercelli
S. Biagio
Monale
S. Caterina
Mongardino
S. Giovanni Battista
Montafia
S. Dionigi
Montaldo Scarampi
SS. Annunziata
Montechiaro d’Asti
Santi Bartolomeo e Caterina
Montegrosso d’Asti
S. Defendente
S. Stefano
Santi Secondo e Matteo
Piea
Santi Filippo e Giacomo
Pino d’Asti
S. Maria della Pieve
Piovà Massaia
Santi Pietro e Giorgio
Portacomaro
S. Bartolomeo
S. Dalmazzo
Refrancore
Santi Martino e Dionigi
Revigliasco d’Asti
S. Martino
Roatto
Santi Michele e Radegonda
Rocca d’Arazzo
S. Caterina
Santi Genesio e Stefano
Rocchetta Tanaro
Santi Nicolao e Stefano
San Damiano d’Asti
S. Bartolomeo
S. Maria della Pietà
S. Pietro
S. Vincenzo
Santi Cosma e Damiano
San Martino Alfieri
Santi Carlo e Maria
San Paolo Solbrito
Santi Pietro e Paolo
Scurzolengo
S. Lorenzo
Settime
S. Nicolao
Soglio
Santi Pietro e Giorgio
Tigliole
S. Lorenzo
S. Maria
Valfenera
Natività di Maria Vergine
S. Bartolomeo
Viale
S. Andrea
Viarigi
Santi Pietro e Silverio
Spirito Santo e S. Carlo
Vigliano d’Asti
S. Secondo
Villa San Secondo
Santi Matteo e Carlo
Villafranca d’Asti
S. Maria Assunta
Villanova d’Asti
S. Marco
Santi Martino e Pietro
Vinchio
S. Defendente
S. Marco

=== Province of Turin ===
Isolabella
S. Bernardo
Pralormo
S. Donato
