= Santi Nazario e Celso, Montechiaro d'Asti =

Church in Montechiaro d'Asti, Italy

Coordinates: 45°01′17″N 8°07′18″E

Church of Saints Nazarius and Celsus
- Chiesa dei Santi Nazario e Celso (Italian)
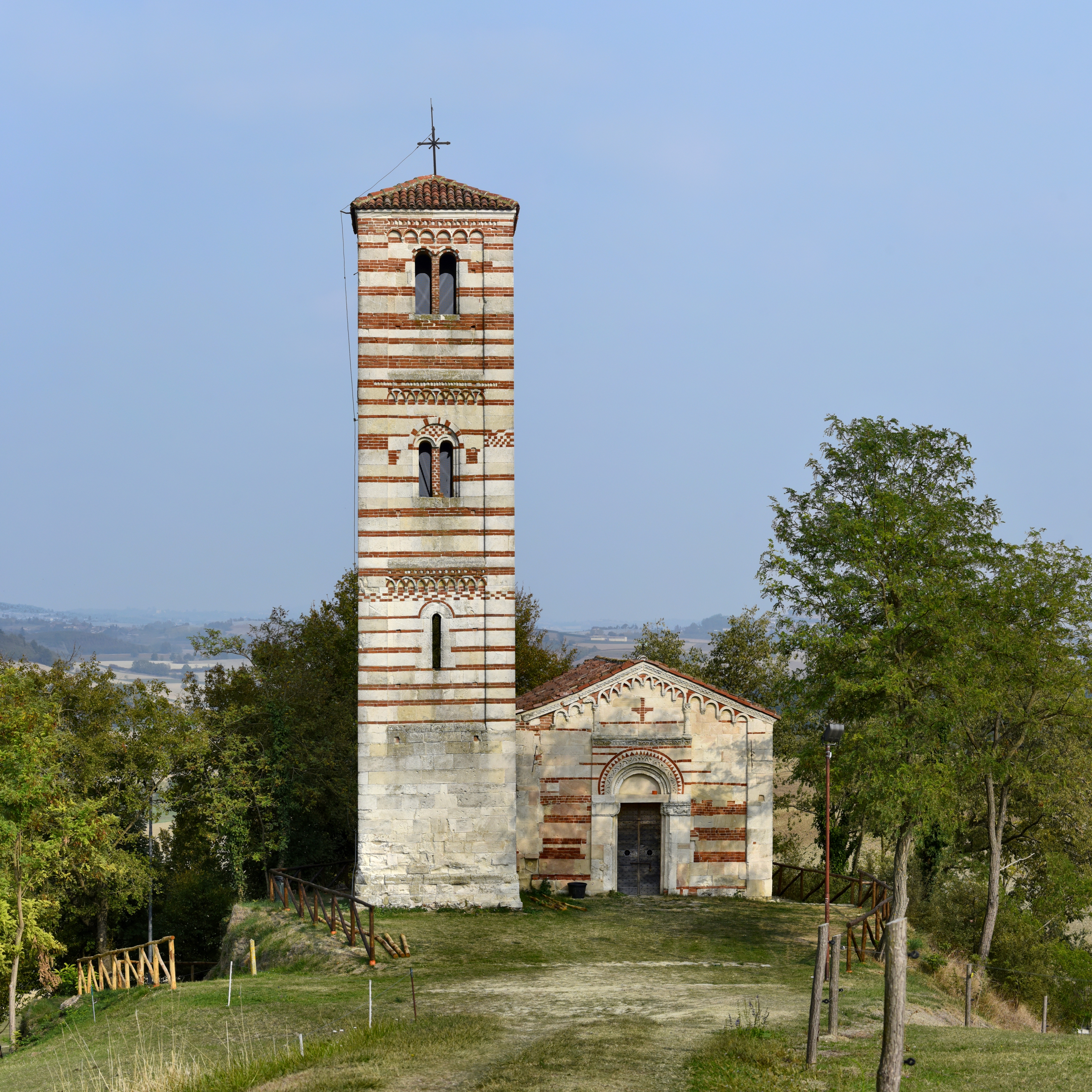

- Location: Montechiaro d'Asti
- Country: Italy
- Denomination: Catholic

History
- Status: Church
- Founded: 12th century
- Dedication: Nazarius and Celsus

Architecture
- Functional status: Active
- Style: Romanesque

Specifications
- Height: About 20 m (65 ft 7 in) the campanile
- Materials: Bricks and sandstone

Administration
- Province: Turin
- Diocese: Asti

The Church of Saints Nazarius and Celsus (Italian: Chiesa dei Santi Nazario e Celso) is a Catholic church near Montechiaro d'Asti, Italy. It is located on the side of a hill called Bric San Nazario and is easily visible in the countryside thanks to its tall bell tower and the chromatic effect due to the alternating stripes of bricks and sandstone. It is an important example of the Romanesque architecture of Montferrat.

== History ==
It was founded in around 1130 on the site of a previous settlement called Mairano, which was later abandoned in the 13th century. People moved to Montechiaro, which is about 2 km far, and the church went on a slow decline.

In 1847, the building was close to collapse, so it was heavily renovated: the whole church was dismantled except the façade, all the bricks and stones were numbered and catalogued and it was accurately rebuilt, following a process called anastylosis. Other minor restoration processes were carried out in the following centuries.
