= Viale, Piedmont =

Viale
- Comune
- Comune di Viale
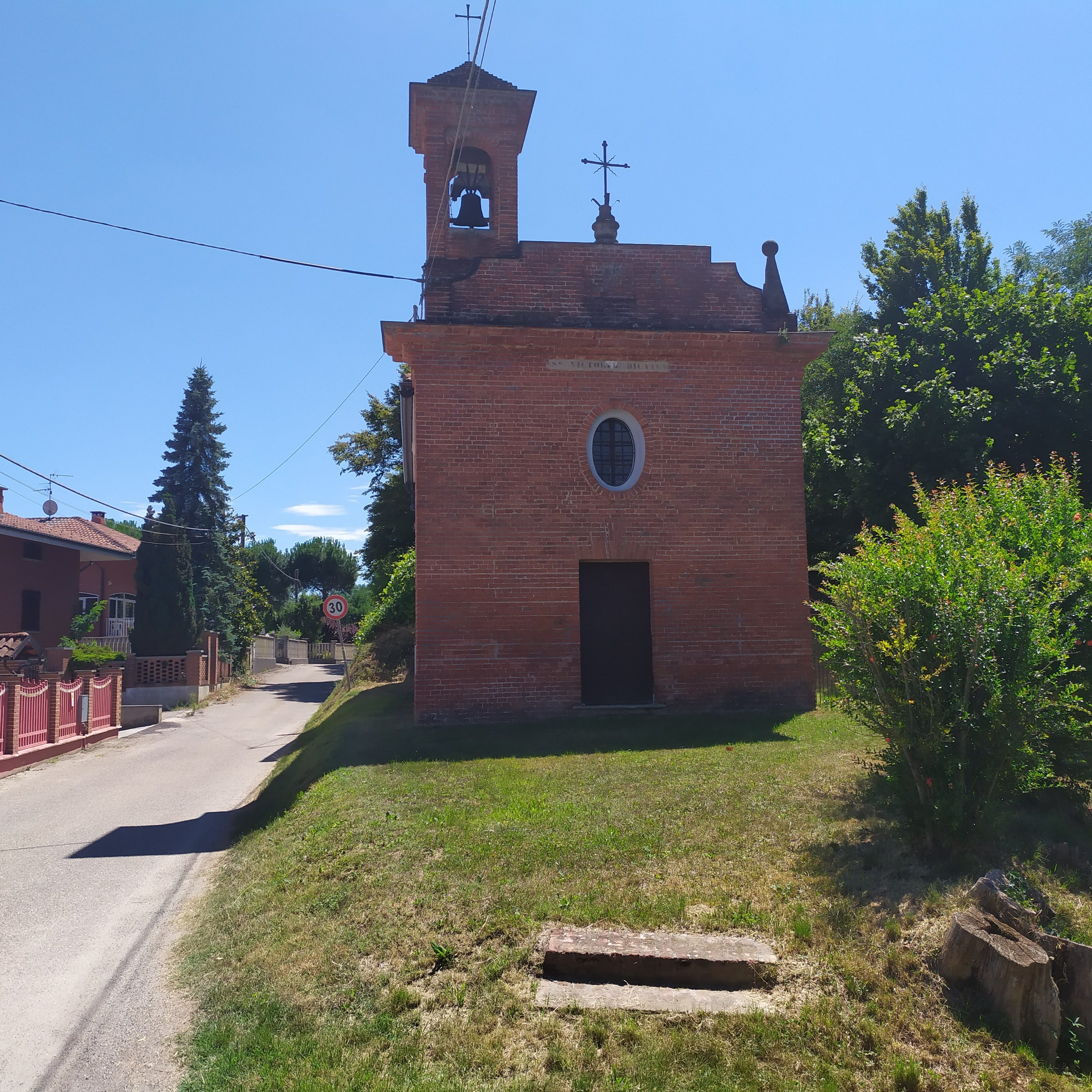

- Location within Italy Location within Piedmont
- Coordinates: 45°0′N 8°3′E
- Country: Italy
- Region: Piedmont
- Province: Province of Asti (AT)

Government
  - Mayor: Oscar Gavello

Area
  - Total: 4.0 km^{2} (1.5 sq mi)

Population (Mar. 2024)
  - Total: 239
  - Density: 60/km^{2} (150/sq mi)
- Time zone: UTC+1 (CET)
  - Summer (DST): UTC+2 (CEST)
- Postal code: 14010
- Dialing code: 0141
- Patron saint: Saint Roch
- Saint day: 16 August

Viale is a comune (municipality) in the Province of Asti in the Italian region Piedmont, located about 30 kilometres (19 mi) east of Turin and about 15 kilometres (9 mi) northwest of Asti. As of 31 March 2004, it had a population of 239 and an area of 4.0 square kilometres (1.5 mi^{2}).

Viale borders the following municipalities: Cortanze, Cortazzone, Montafia, Piea, and Soglio.

== Demographic evolution ==
Historical population

Year	Pop.	±%
1861	743	—
1871	719	−3.2%
1881	805	+12.0%
1901	866	+7.6%
1911	865	−0.1%

Year	Pop.	±%
1921	768	−11.2%
1931	688	−10.4%
1936	625	−9.2%
1951	476	−23.8%
1961	343	−27.9%

Year	Pop.	±%
1971	304	−11.4%
1981	275	−9.5%
1991	258	−6.2%
2001	267	+3.5%

Source: Data from ISTAT
