= Soglio, Piedmont =

Soglio
- Comune
- Comune di Soglio
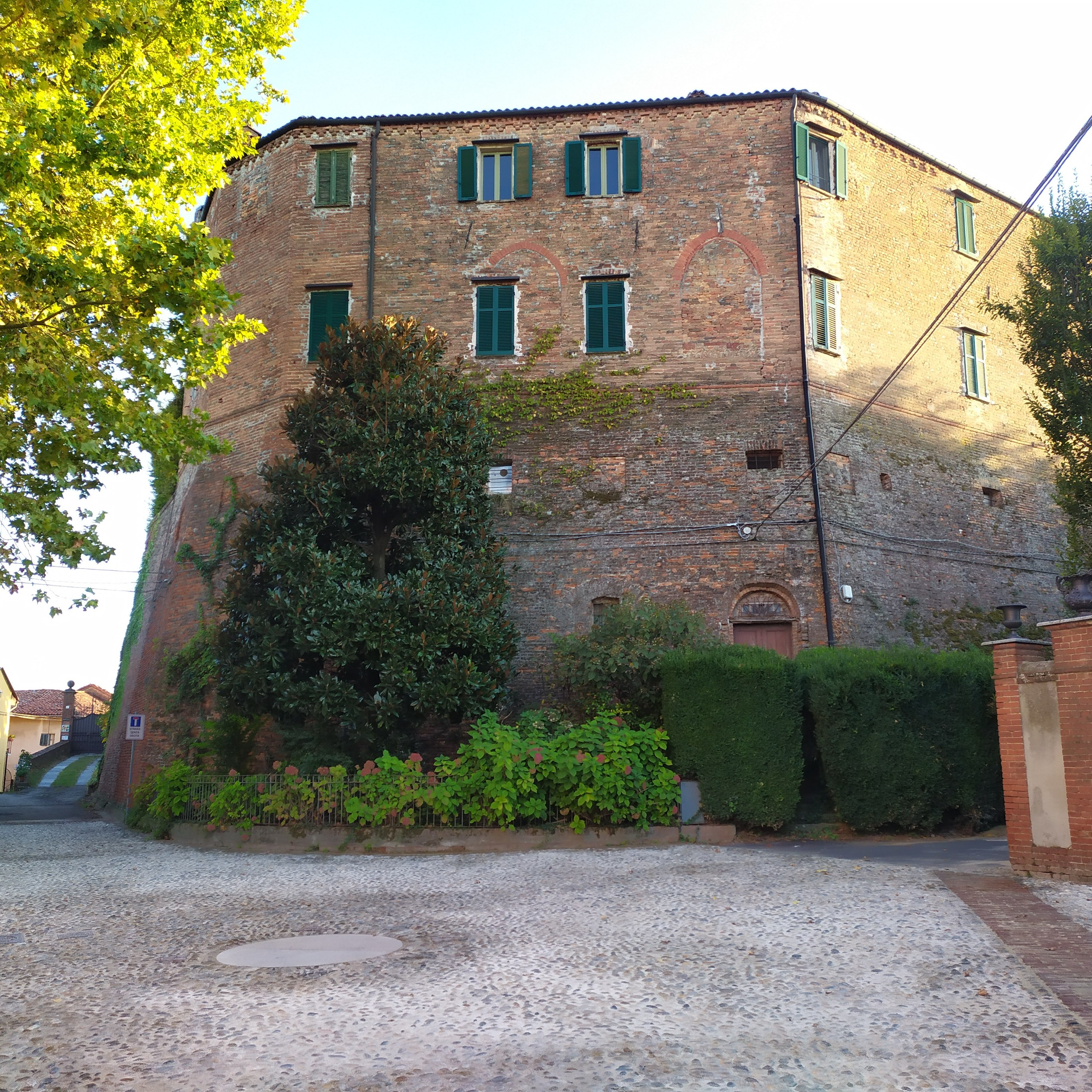

- Coat of arms

- Location within Italy Location within Piedmont
- Coordinates: 45°0′N 8°5′E
- Country: Italy
- Region: Piedmont
- Province: Province of Asti (AT)

Government
  - Mayor: Carlo Cosimo Carpignano

Area
  - Total: 3.5 km^{2} (1.4 sq mi)

Population (March 2024)
  - Total: 129
  - Density: 37/km^{2} (95/sq mi)
- Time zone: UTC+1 (CET)
  - Summer (DST): UTC+2 (CEST)
- Postal code: 14010
- Dialing code: 0141

Soglio is a comune (municipality) in the Province of Asti in the Italian region Piedmont, located about 30 kilometres (19 mi) east of Turin and about 14 kilometres (9 mi) northwest of Asti. As of 31 December 2004, it had a population of 129 and an area of 3.5 square kilometres (1.4 mi^{2}).

Soglio borders the following municipalities: Camerano Casasco, Cortanze, Cortazzone, Montechiaro d'Asti, Piea, and Viale.

== Demographic evolution ==
Historical population

Year	Pop.	±%
1861	570	—
1871	586	+2.8%
1881	590	+0.7%
1901	510	−13.6%
1911	481	−5.7%

Year	Pop.	±%
1921	438	−8.9%
1931	386	−11.9%
1936	363	−6.0%
1951	320	−11.8%
1961	236	−26.2%

Year	Pop.	±%
1971	173	−26.7%
1981	144	−16.8%
1991	150	+4.2%
2001	135	−10.0%

Source: Data from ISTAT
