= Mombaldone =

- Comune
- Comune di Mombaldone
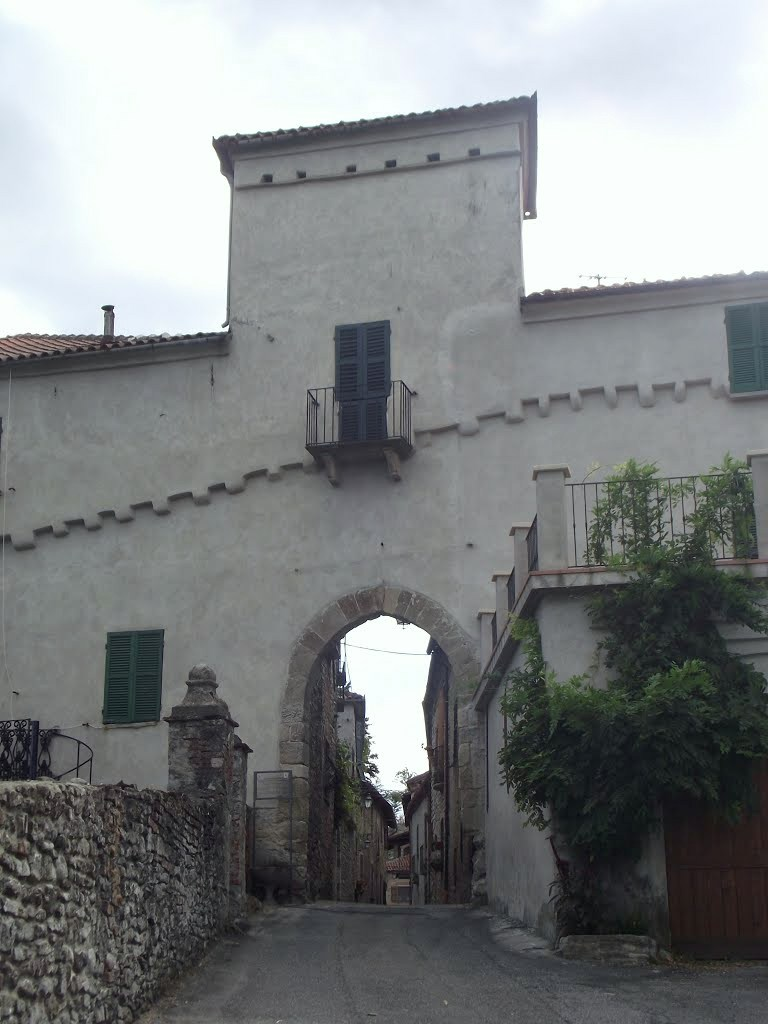

- Coat of arms

- Location within Italy Location within Piedmont
- Coordinates: 44°34′N 8°20′E
- Country: Italy
- Region: Piedmont
- Province: Asti (AT)

Government
  - Mayor: Sonia Poggio

Area
  - Total: 12.2 km^{2} (4.7 sq mi)
- Elevation: 219 m (719 ft)

Population (31 October 2017)
  - Total: 197
  - Density: 16.1/km^{2} (41.8/sq mi)
- Demonym: Mombaldonesi
- Time zone: UTC+1 (CET)
  - Summer (DST): UTC+2 (CEST)
- Postal code: 14050
- Dialing code: 0144
- Website: Official website

Mombaldone is a comune (municipality) in the Province of Asti in the Italian region Piedmont, located about 70 kilometres (43 mi) southeast of Turin and about 40 kilometres (25 mi) southeast of Asti. It is one of I Borghi più belli d'Italia ("The most beautiful villages of Italy").
