= Camerano Casasco =

- Comune
- Comune di Camerano Casasco
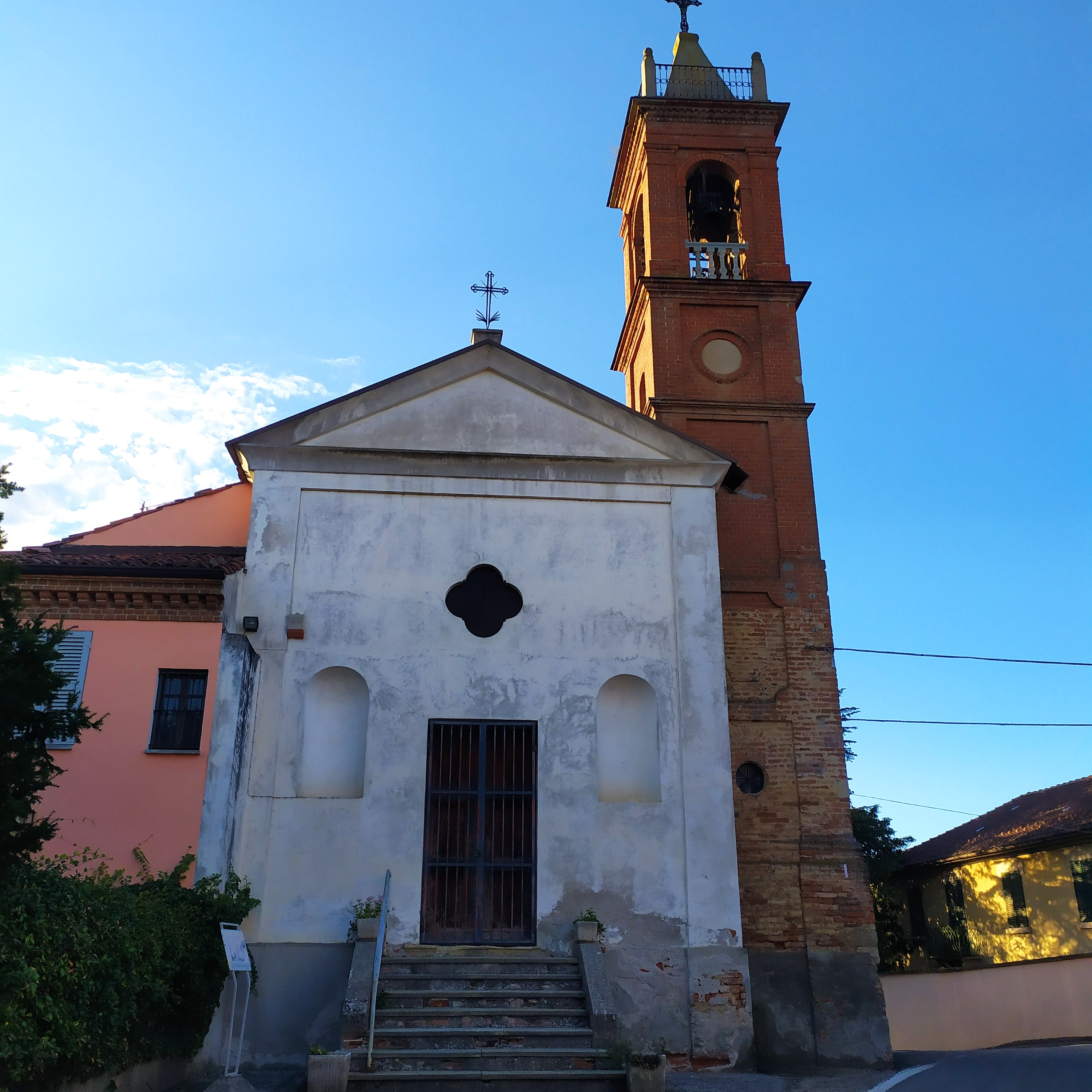

- Coat of arms

- Location within Italy Location within Piedmont
- Coordinates: 44°59′N 8°5′E
- Country: Italy
- Region: Piedmont
- Province: Asti (AT)
- Frazioni: Casasco, Madonna, Serra

Government
  - Mayor: Valter Penna

Area
  - Total: 6.7 km^{2} (2.6 sq mi)
- Elevation: 300 m (980 ft)

Population (31 January 2024)
  - Total: 390
  - Density: 58/km^{2} (150/sq mi)
- Demonym: Cameranesi
- Time zone: UTC+1 (CET)
  - Summer (DST): UTC+2 (CEST)
- Postal code: 14020
- Dialing code: 0141
- Patron saint: St. Lawrence
- Saint day: 10 August
- Website: Official website

Camerano Casasco is a comune (municipality) in the Province of Asti in the Italian region Piedmont, located about 30 kilometres (19 mi) southeast of Turin and about 13 kilometres (8 mi) northwest of Asti.

Camerano Casasco borders the following municipalities: Chiusano d'Asti, Cinaglio, Cortandone, Cortazzone, Montechiaro d'Asti, and Soglio.
