= Cortandone =

Cortandone Cortandon (Piedmontese)
- Comune
- Comune di Cortandone
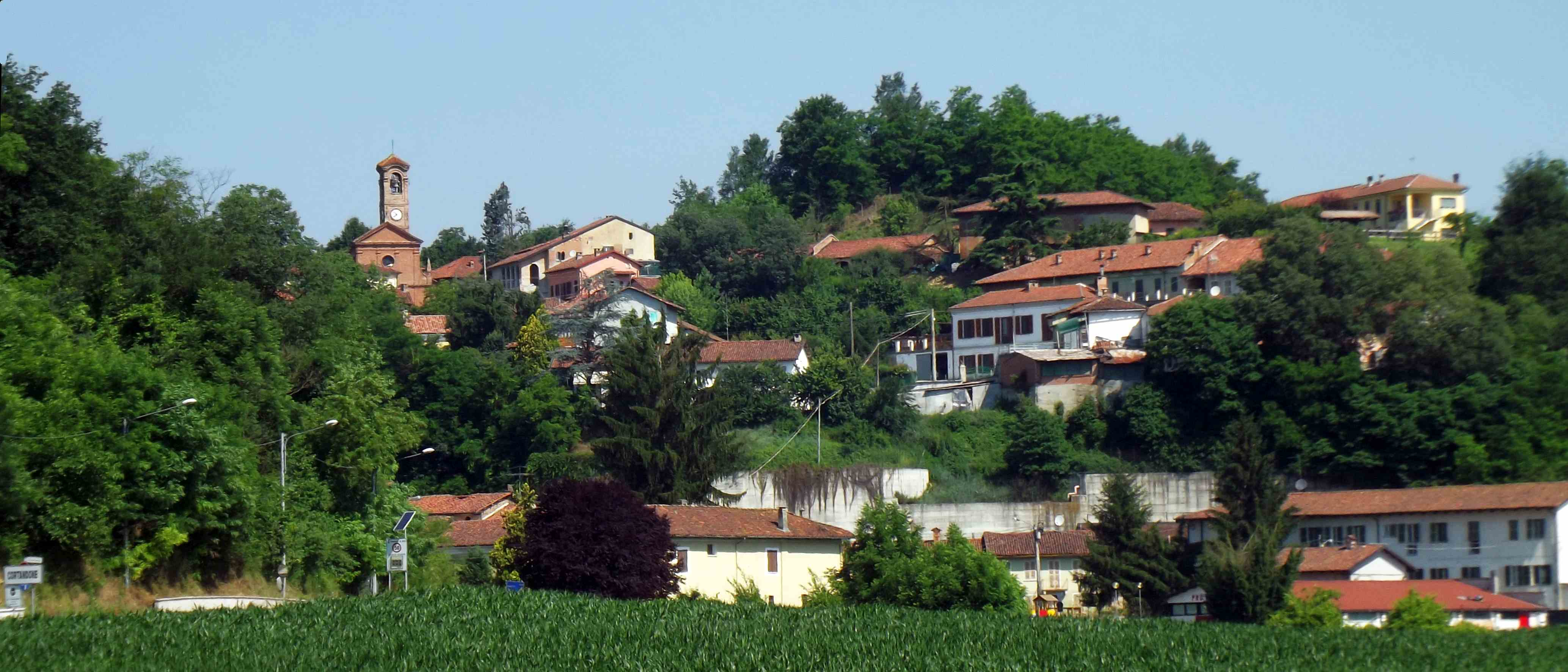
- View of Cortandone

- Coat of arms

- Location within Italy Location within Piedmont
- Coordinates: 44°58′N 8°4′E
- Country: Italy
- Region: Piedmont
- Province: Province of Asti (AT)
- Frazioni: Campia, Bricco Cisero, Valinosio

Government
  - Mayor: Claudio Stroppiana

Area
  - Total: 5.02 km^{2} (1.94 sq mi)
- Elevation 718,504: 219 m (719 ft)

Population (Gen. 2020)
  - Total: 308
  - Density: 61.4/km^{2} (159/sq mi)
- Demonym: cortandonesi
- Time zone: UTC+1 (CET)
  - Summer (DST): UTC+2 (CEST)
- Postal code: 14013
- Dialing code: 0141
- Patron saint: Sant' Antonio Abate
- Saint day: 17 Gen.
- Website: www.comune.cortandone.at.it

Cortandone is a comune (municipality) in the Province of Asti in the Italian region Piedmont, located about 30 kilometres (19 mi) southeast of Turin and about 13 kilometres (8 mi) northwest of Asti. As of 31 December 2019, it had a population of 308 and an area of 5.02 square kilometres (1.94 mi^{2}).

Cortandone borders the following municipalities: Camerano Casasco, Cinaglio, Cortazzone, Maretto, and Monale.

== History ==
Cortandone belonged, in the twelfth century, for over a hundred years to the "Di Cortandone" (local lords). Later the feud passed to the Mandra, then again to the Pallidi, Pallio, Scarampi and Di Macello. For more than a century, from 1654, the Facello and the Pelletto were the only lords of Cortandone.

== Geography ==
The capital is located in the hydrographic right of the valley washed by the river of Monale and the territory is characterized by very diverse terrain vocation according to the structure of the ground, height and exposure. The lower parts consist of marine deposits, while the hills have strong clays alternating with sands.

The town is mainly surrounded by woods and is surrounded by corn fields and sunflowers.

== Food ==
The gastronomic speciality is represented by the Bagna càuda, celebrated since 57 edition, from the proloco of the village, during all the weekends of the month of November.

== Events ==
In September the village celebrates the Festa delle Masche, the witches in Piedmontese language, legendary figures of the tradition of Langhe and Monferrato.

== Demographic evolution ==
Historical population

Year	Pop.	±%
1861	462	—
1871	493	+6.7%
1881	520	+5.5%
1901	592	+13.8%
1911	619	+4.6%

Year	Pop.	±%
1921	626	+1.1%
1931	578	−7.7%
1936	531	−8.1%
1951	446	−16.0%
1961	329	−26.2%

Year	Pop.	±%
1971	272	−17.3%
1981	245	−9.9%
1991	253	+3.3%
2001	290	+14.6%

Source: Data from ISTAT
