= Capriglio =

- Comune
- Comune di Capriglio
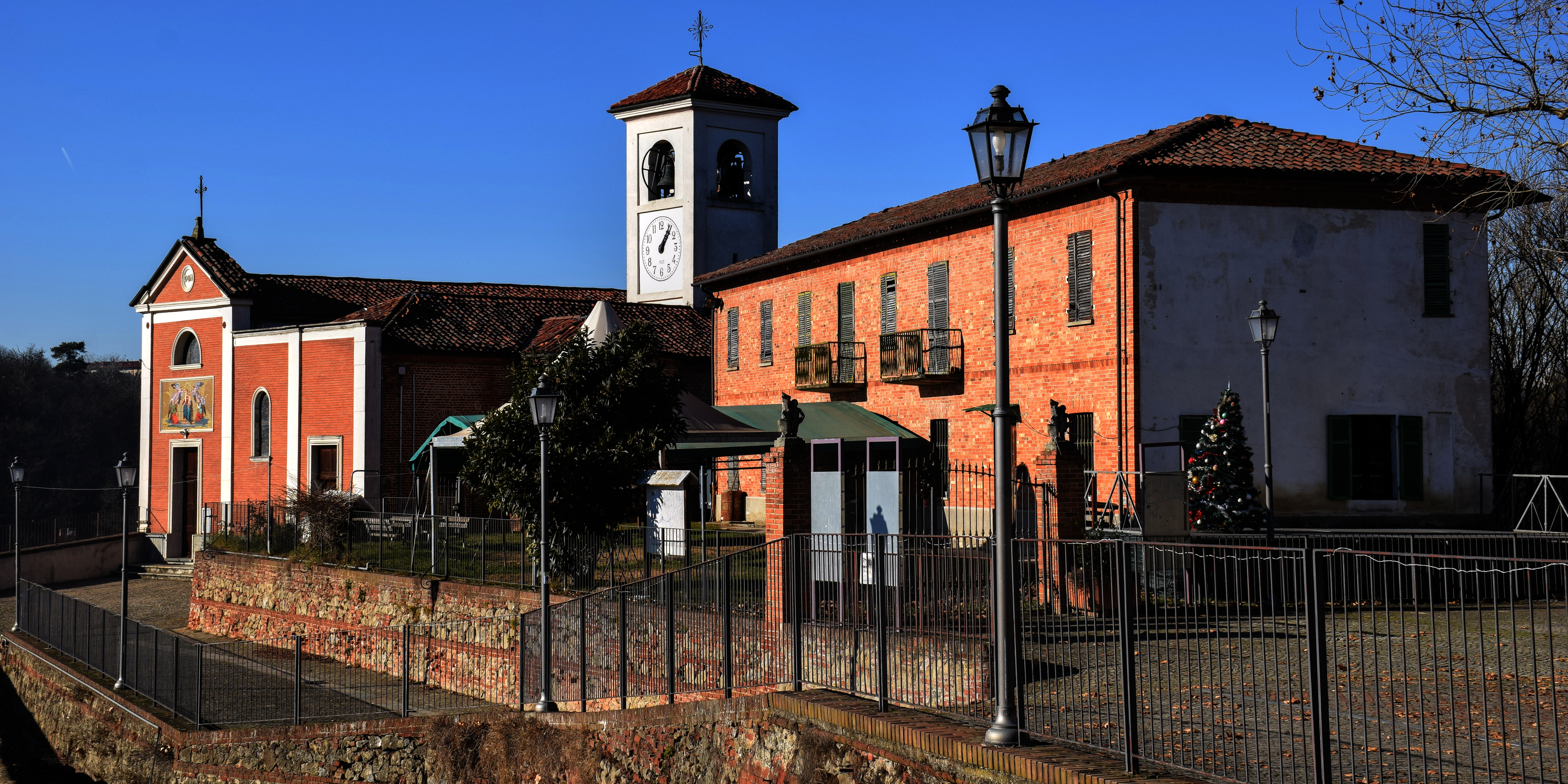
- View of Capriglio

- Coat of arms

- Location within Italy Location within Piedmont
- Coordinates: 45°0′N 8°0′E
- Country: Italy
- Region: Piedmont
- Province: Province of Asti (AT)

Government
  - Mayor: Tiziana Gaeta

Area
  - Total: 5.1 km^{2} (2.0 sq mi)
- Elevation: 231 m (758 ft)

Population (31 December 2013)
  - Total: 281
  - Density: 55/km^{2} (140/sq mi)
- Demonym: Caprigliesi
- Time zone: UTC+1 (CET)
  - Summer (DST): UTC+2 (CEST)
- Postal code: 14014
- Dialing code: 0141

Capriglio is a comune (municipality) in the Province of Asti in the Italian region Piedmont, located about 25 kilometres (16 mi) southeast of Turin and about 20 kilometres (12 mi) northwest of Asti.

Capriglio borders the following municipalities: Buttigliera d'Asti, Castelnuovo Don Bosco, Cerreto d'Asti, Montafia, Passerano Marmorito, and Piovà Massaia
