= Piovà Massaia =

- Comune
- Comune di Piovà Massaia
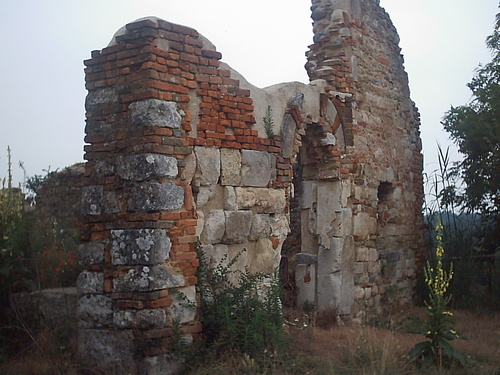

- Coat of arms

- Location within Italy Location within Piedmont
- Coordinates: 45°3′N 8°3′E
- Country: Italy
- Region: Piedmont
- Province: Asti (AT)
- Frazioni: Braja, Cascine Freis, Cascine San Pietro, Cascine Zingari, Castelvero, Gallareto

Government
  - Mayor: Antonello Murgia

Area
  - Total: 10.8 km^{2} (4.2 sq mi)
- Elevation: 300 m (980 ft)

Population (31 July 2010)
  - Total: 686
  - Density: 63.5/km^{2} (165/sq mi)
- Demonym: Piovatesi
- Time zone: UTC+1 (CET)
  - Summer (DST): UTC+2 (CEST)
- Postal code: 14020
- Dialing code: 0141

Piovà Massaia is a comune (municipality) in the Province of Asti in the Italian region Piedmont, located about 30 kilometres (19 mi) east of Turin and about 20 kilometres (12 mi) northwest of Asti.

Piovà Massaia borders the following municipalities: Capriglio, Cerreto d'Asti, Cocconato, Cunico, Montafia, Montiglio Monferrato, Passerano Marmorito, and Piea.

== See also ==
- ICP srl
