= Maretto =

- Comune
- Comune di Maretto
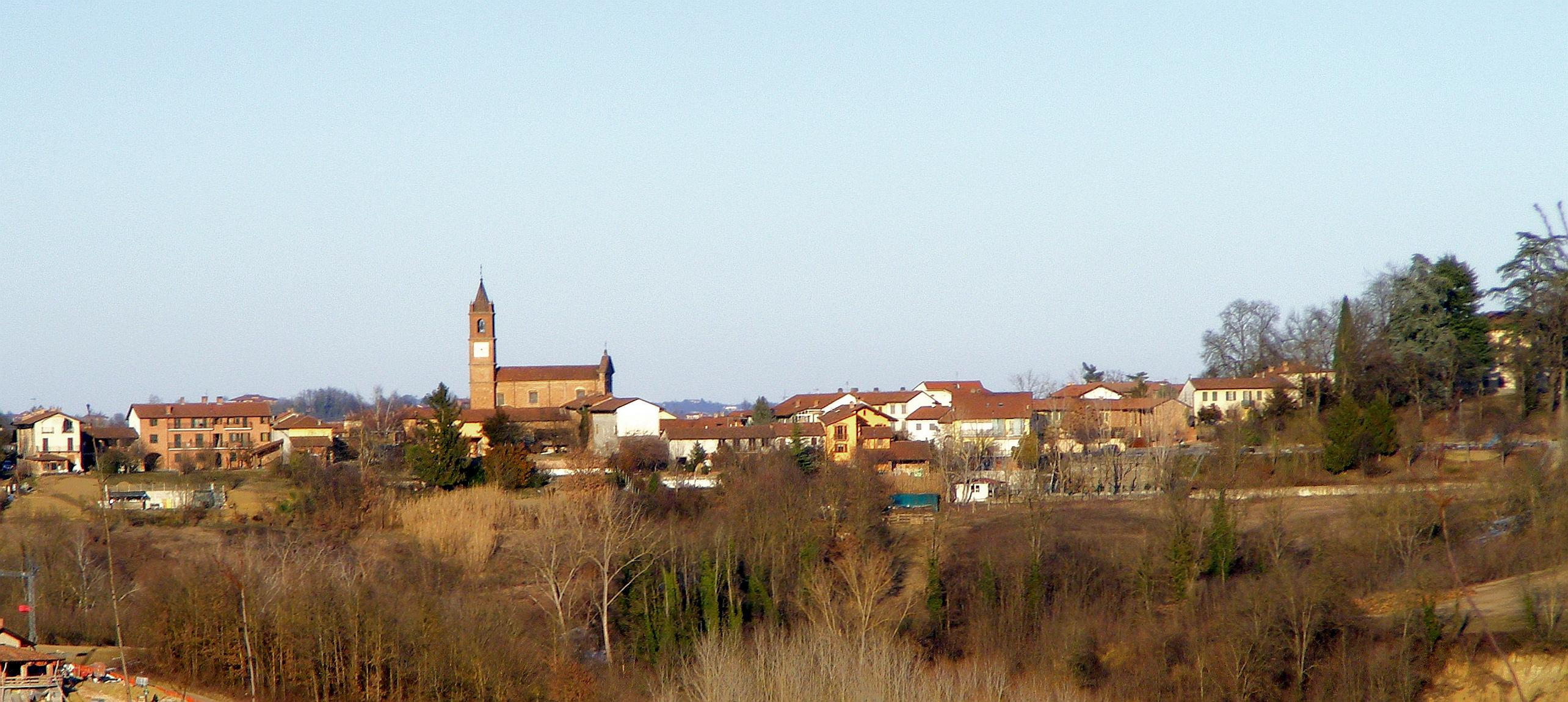
- View of Maretto

- Coat of arms

- Location within Italy Location within Piedmont
- Coordinates: 44°57′N 8°2′E
- Country: Italy
- Region: Piedmont
- Province: Asti (AT)

Government
  - Mayor: Roberto Palma

Area
  - Total: 4.9 km^{2} (1.9 sq mi)

Population (31 May 2007)
  - Total: 387
  - Density: 79/km^{2} (200/sq mi)
- Demonym: Marettesi
- Time zone: UTC+1 (CET)
  - Summer (DST): UTC+2 (CEST)
- Postal code: 14018
- Dialing code: 0141
- Patron saint: Our Lady of Mount Carmel and St. Michael
- Saint day: Last Sunday in July

Maretto is a comune (municipality) in the Province of Asti in the Italian region Piedmont, located about 30 kilometres (19 mi) southeast of Turin and about 14 kilometres (9 mi) northwest of Asti.

Maretto borders the following municipalities: Cortandone, Cortazzone, Monale, Roatto, and Villafranca d'Asti.
