= Province of Asti =

Coordinates: 44°53′56″N 8°12′28″E

Province of Asti Provincia di Asti (Italian) Provincia d'Ast (Piedmontese)
- Province
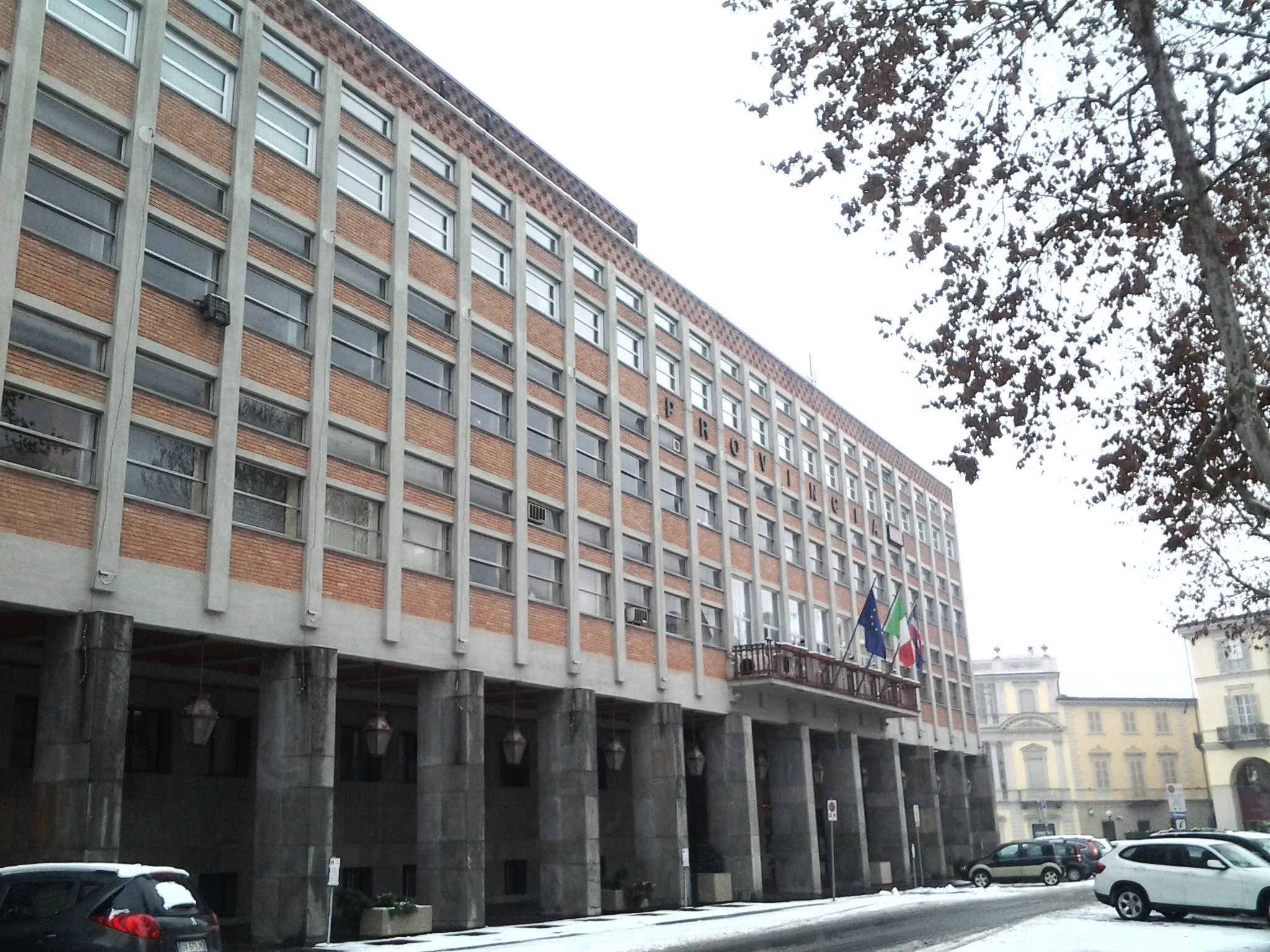
- The provincial seat

- Flag Coat of arms

- Location of the province of Asti in Italy
- Country: Italy
- Region: Piedmont
- Capital(s): Asti
- Municipalities: 118

Government
  - President: Simone Nosenzo

Area
  - Total: 1,510.19 km^{2} (583.09 sq mi)

Population (2026)
  - Total: 207,059
  - Density: 137.108/km^{2} (355.108/sq mi)

GDP
  - Total: €5.368 billion (2015)
  - Per capita: €24,575 (2015)
- Time zone: UTC+1 (CET)
  - Summer (DST): UTC+2 (CEST)
- Postal code: 14010-14026, 14030, 14032-14037, 14039-14055, 14057-14059, 14100
- Telephone prefix: 011, 0141, 0144
- Vehicle registration: AT
- ISTAT code: 005

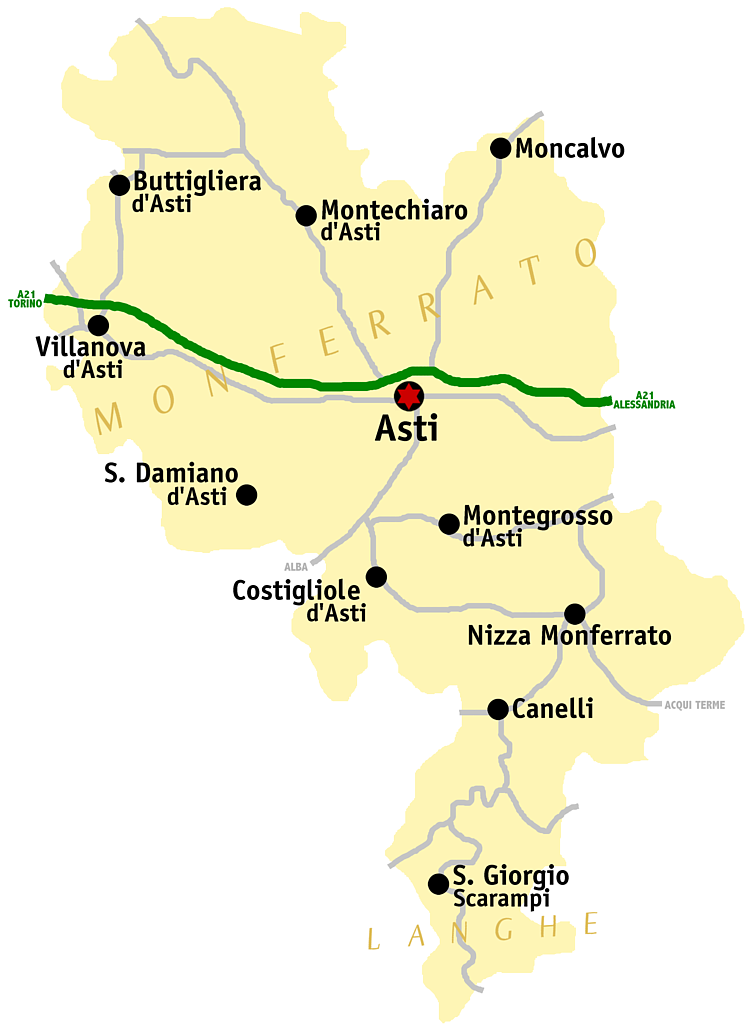
Map of the province of Asti

The Province of Asti (Italian: provincia di Asti; Piedmontese: provincia d'Ast) is a province in the region of Piedmont in northern Italy. Its capital is the city of Asti. It borders the Metropolitan City of Turin to the northwest, the Province of Cuneo to the southwest, the Province of Alessandria to the east, and the Province of Savona in Liguria to the south. It has a population of 207,059 in an area of 1,510.19 square kilometres (583.09 sq mi) across its 118 municipalities.

== History ==
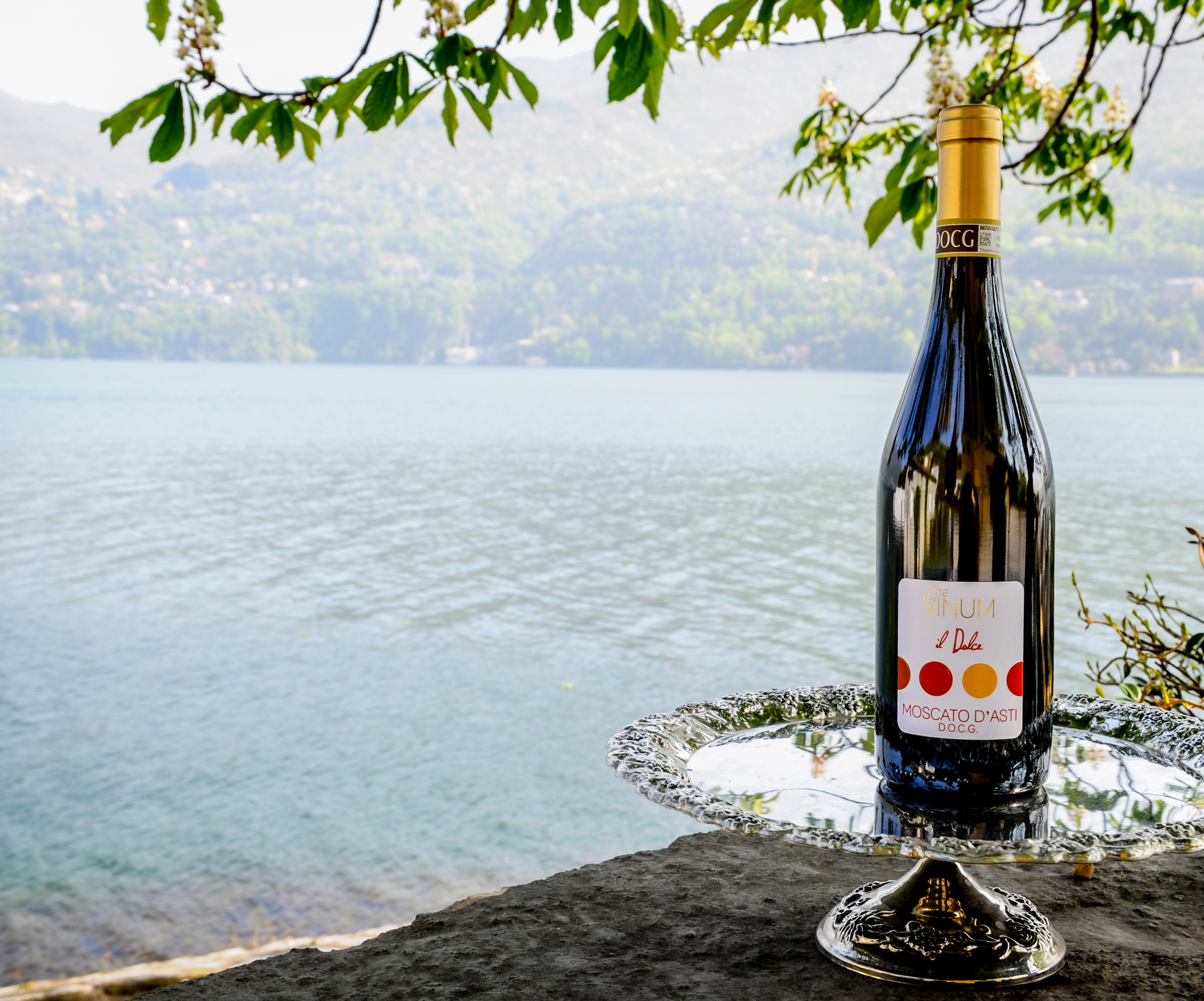
Moscato d'Asti wine

The Province of Asti was re-established on 1 April 1935 by Royal Decree No. 297 of King Victor Emmanuel III. It was detached from the existing province of Alessandria into which it had been absorbed upon the creation of that province in 1859.

The Province of Asti is among the institutions awarded the Gold Medal for Military Valor (Medaglia d'Oro al Valor Militare) for its contribution to the partisan struggle during the last two years of the Second World War.

== Government ==
=== Municipalities ===
The province has 118 municipalities:

- Agliano Terme
- Albugnano
- Antignano
- Aramengo
- Asti
- Azzano d'Asti
- Baldichieri d'Asti
- Belveglio
- Berzano di San Pietro
- Bruno
- Bubbio
- Buttigliera d'Asti
- Calamandrana
- Calliano
- Calosso
- Camerano Casasco
- Canelli
- Cantarana
- Capriglio
- Casorzo
- Cassinasco
- Castagnole delle Lanze
- Castagnole Monferrato
- Castel Boglione
- Castel Rocchero
- Castell'Alfero
- Castellero
- Castelletto Molina
- Castello di Annone
- Castelnuovo Belbo
- Castelnuovo Calcea
- Castelnuovo Don Bosco
- Cellarengo
- Celle Enomondo
- Cerreto d'Asti
- Cerro Tanaro
- Cessole
- Chiusano d'Asti
- Cinaglio
- Cisterna d'Asti
- Coazzolo
- Cocconato
- Corsione
- Cortandone
- Cortanze
- Cortazzone
- Cortiglione
- Cossombrato
- Costigliole d'Asti
- Cunico
- Dusino San Michele
- Ferrere
- Fontanile
- Frinco
- Grana
- Grazzano Badoglio
- Incisa Scapaccino
- Isola d'Asti
- Loazzolo
- Maranzana
- Maretto
- Moasca
- Mombaldone
- Mombaruzzo
- Mombercelli
- Monale
- Monastero Bormida
- Moncalvo
- Moncucco Torinese
- Mongardino
- Montabone
- Montafia
- Montaldo Scarampi
- Montechiaro d'Asti
- Montegrosso d'Asti
- Montemagno
- Montiglio Monferrato
- Moransengo-Tonengo
- Nizza Monferrato
- Olmo Gentile
- Passerano Marmorito
- Penango
- Piea
- Pino d'Asti
- Piovà Massaia
- Portacomaro
- Quaranti
- Refrancore
- Revigliasco d'Asti
- Roatto
- Robella
- Rocca d'Arazzo
- Roccaverano
- Rocchetta Palafea
- Rocchetta Tanaro
- San Damiano d'Asti
- San Giorgio Scarampi
- San Martino Alfieri
- San Marzano Oliveto
- San Paolo Solbrito
- Scurzolengo
- Serole
- Sessame
- Settime
- Soglio
- Tigliole
- Tonco
- Vaglio Serra
- Valfenera
- Vesime
- Viale
- Viarigi
- Vigliano d'Asti
- Villa San Secondo
- Villafranca d'Asti
- Villanova d'Asti
- Vinchio

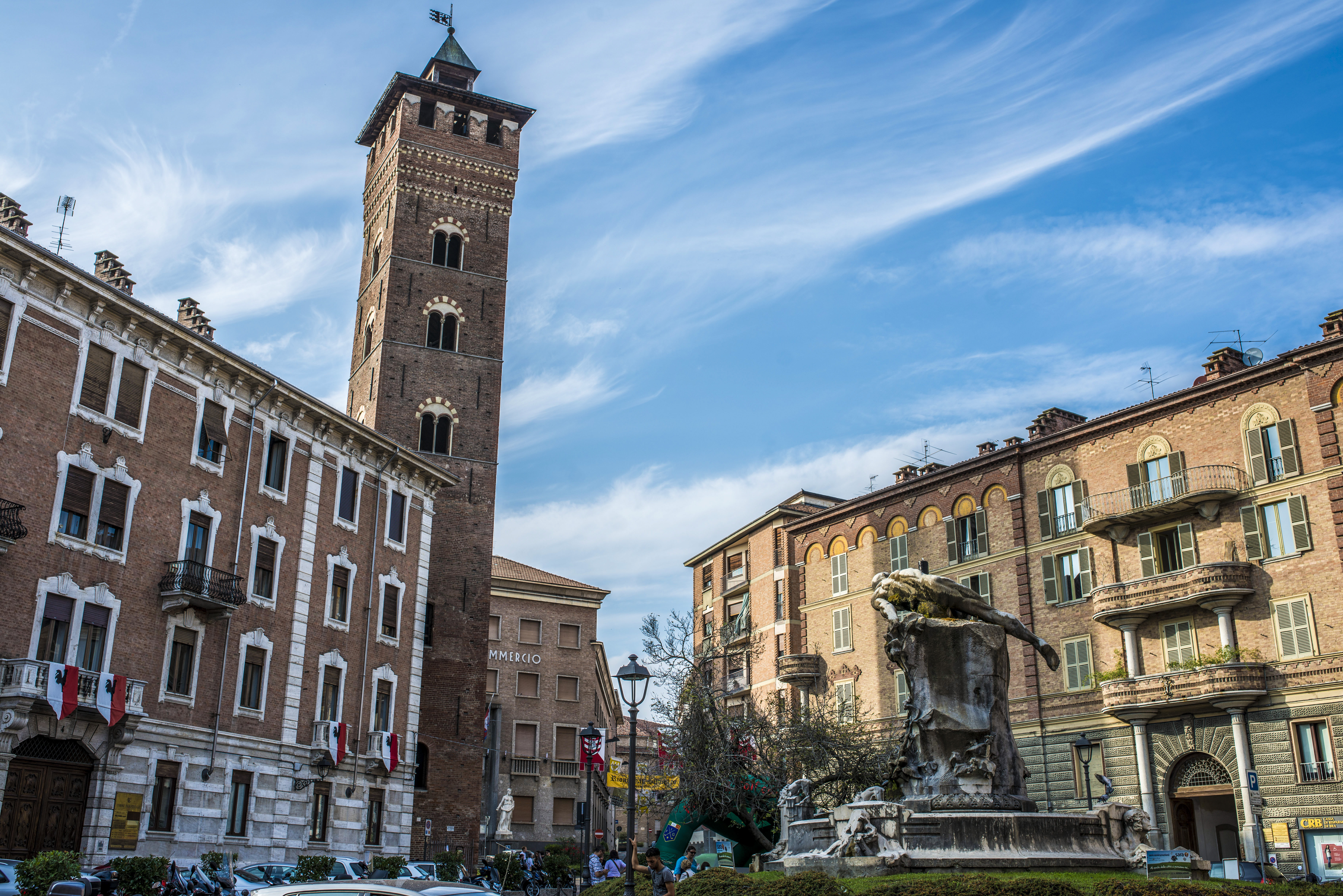
Asti

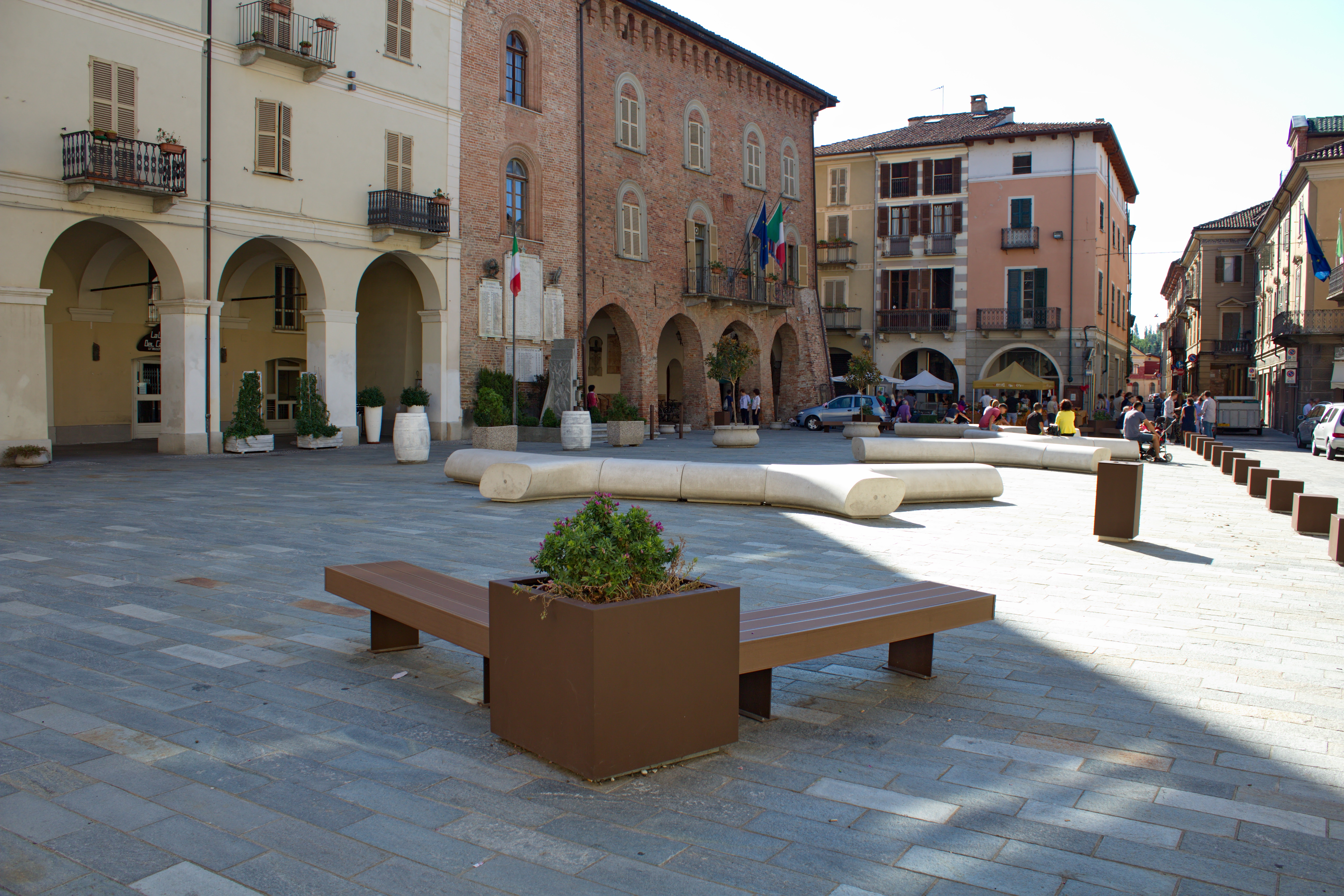
Nizza Monferrato

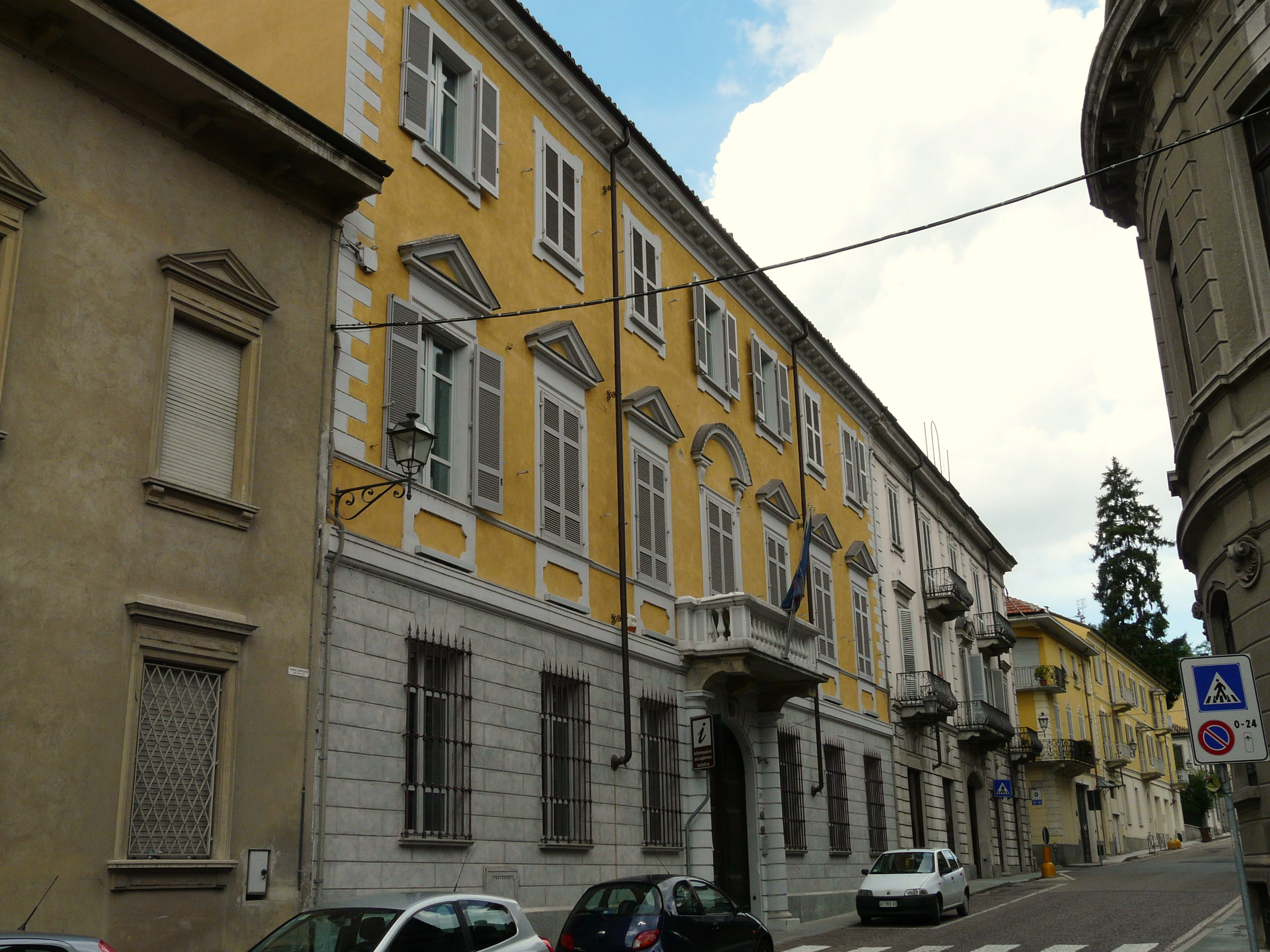
Canelli

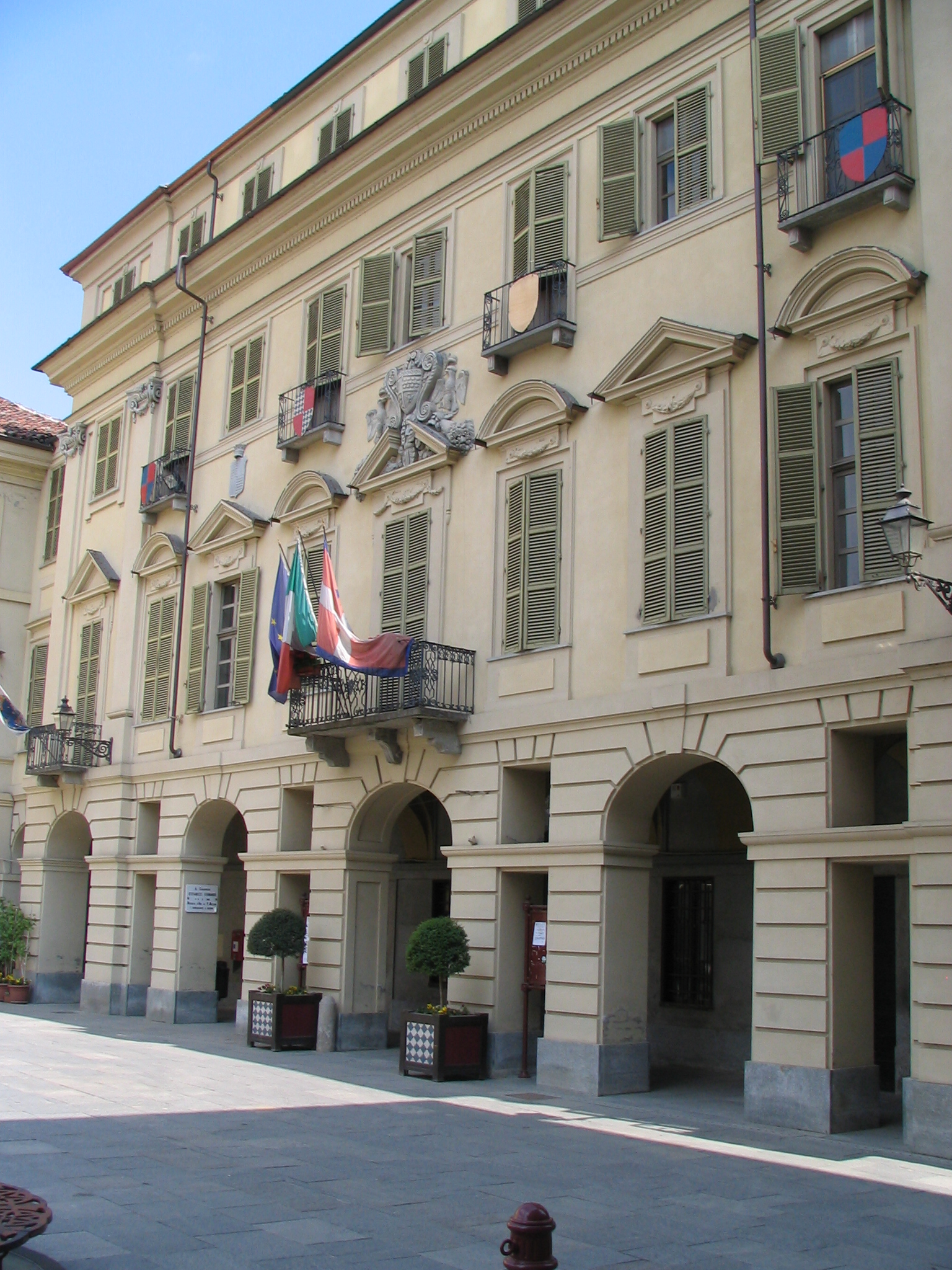
San Damiano d'Asti

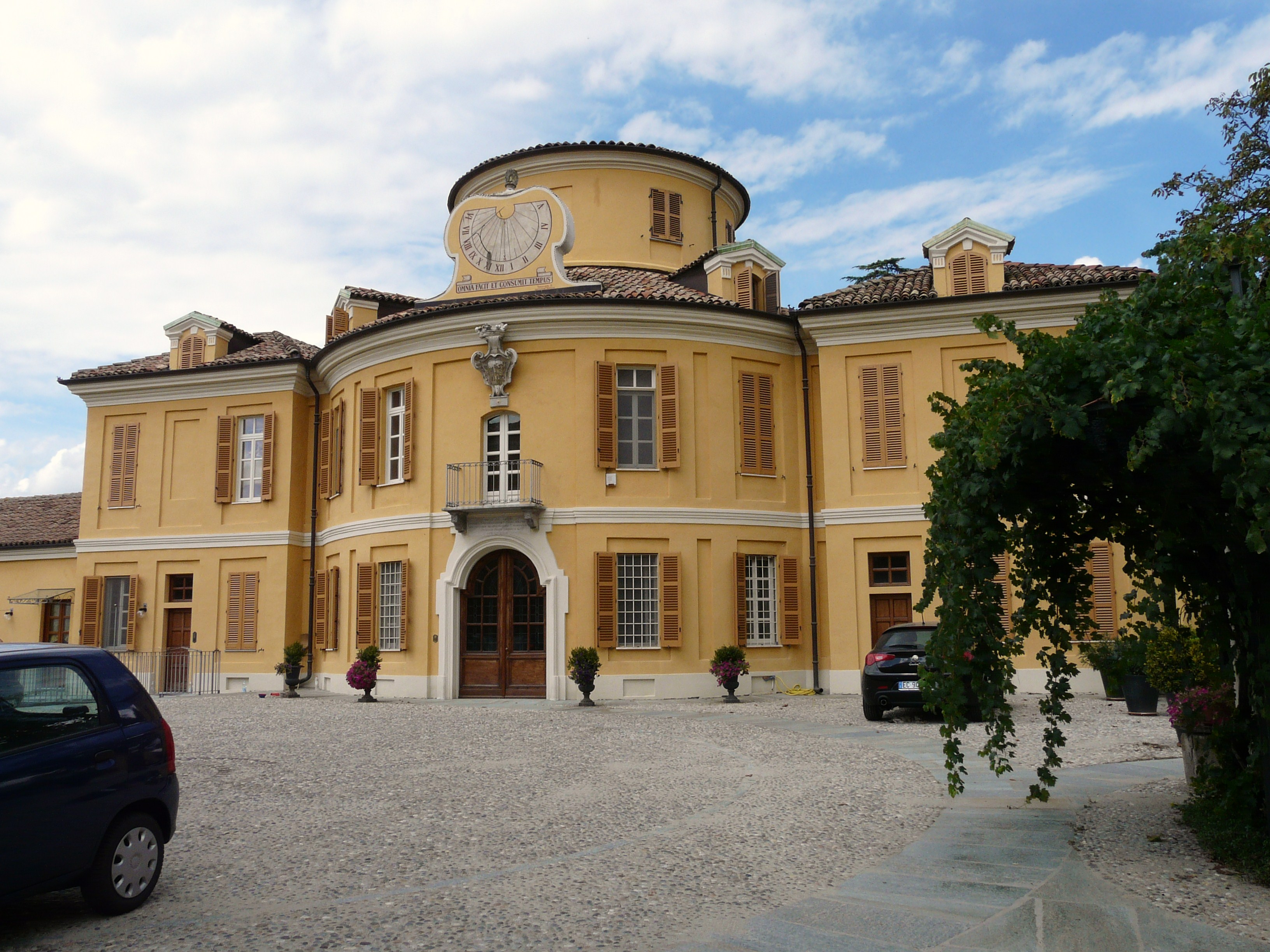
Costigliole d'Asti

== Demographics ==
As of 2026, the population is 207,059, of which 49.3% are male, and 50.7% are female. Minors make up 13.6% of the population, and seniors make up 28.0%.

Historical population

Year	Pop.	±%
1861	226,698	—
1871	243,464	+7.4%
1881	253,672	+4.2%
1901	284,803	+12.3%
1911	279,681	−1.8%
1921	273,564	−2.2%
1931	255,077	−6.8%
1936	245,764	−3.7%

Year	Pop.	±%
1951	224,300	−8.7%
1961	214,604	−4.3%
1971	218,547	+1.8%
1981	215,382	−1.4%
1991	208,332	−3.3%
2001	208,339	+0.0%
2011	217,573	+4.4%
2021	208,286	−4.3%

Source: ISTAT

=== Immigration ===
As of 2025, immigrants make up 14.7% of the population. The 5 largest foreign countries of birth are Romania, Albania, North Macedonia, Morocco, and Moldova.

== Transport ==
=== Motorways ===
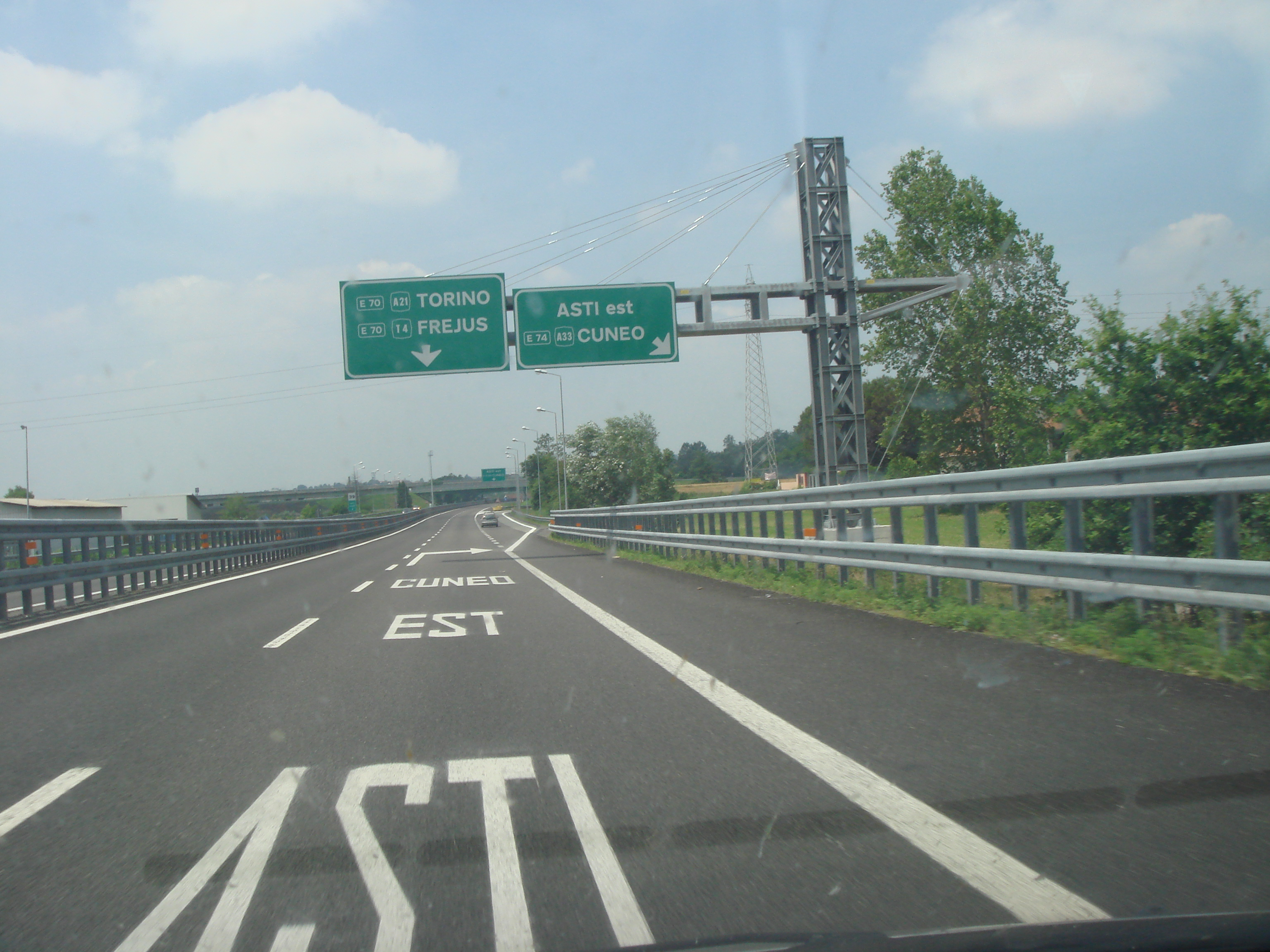
The Autostrada A21 near Asti.

The province is crossed by the following motorways (in Italian, autostrade):

- Autostrada A21: Turin - Piacenza - Brescia
- Autostrada A33: Asti - Alba / Cherasco - Cuneo

== International relations ==
The Province of Asti is twinned with:

- Miami-Dade County, Florida, United States, since 1985

== See also ==
- Piemonte (wine)
