= Cunico =

- Comune
- Comune di Cunico
- Coat of arms

- Location within Italy Location within Piedmont
- Coordinates: 45°2′N 8°6′E
- Country: Italy
- Region: Piedmont
- Province: Province of Asti (AT)

Area
  - Total: 6.9 km^{2} (2.7 sq mi)

Population (Dec. 2004)
  - Total: 496
  - Density: 72/km^{2} (190/sq mi)
- Time zone: UTC+1 (CET)
  - Summer (DST): UTC+2 (CEST)
- Postal code: 14020
- Dialing code: 0141

Cunico is a comune (municipality) in the Province of Asti in the Italian region Piedmont, located about 30 kilometres (19 mi) east of Turin and about 15 kilometres (9 mi) northwest of Asti. As of 31 December 2004, it had a population of 496 and an area of 6.9 square kilometres (2.7 mi^{2}).

Cunico borders the following municipalities: Cortanze, Montechiaro d'Asti, Montiglio Monferrato, Piea, and Piovà Massaia.

== Demographic evolution ==
Historical population

Year	Pop.	±%
1861	1,153	—
1871	1,148	−0.4%
1881	1,088	−5.2%
1901	1,103	+1.4%
1911	1,020	−7.5%

Year	Pop.	±%
1921	1,018	−0.2%
1931	992	−2.6%
1936	942	−5.0%
1951	772	−18.0%
1961	710	−8.0%

Year	Pop.	±%
1971	553	−22.1%
1981	554	+0.2%
1991	470	−15.2%
2001	497	+5.7%

Source: Data from ISTAT
