= Cortanze =

- Comune
- Comune di Cortanze
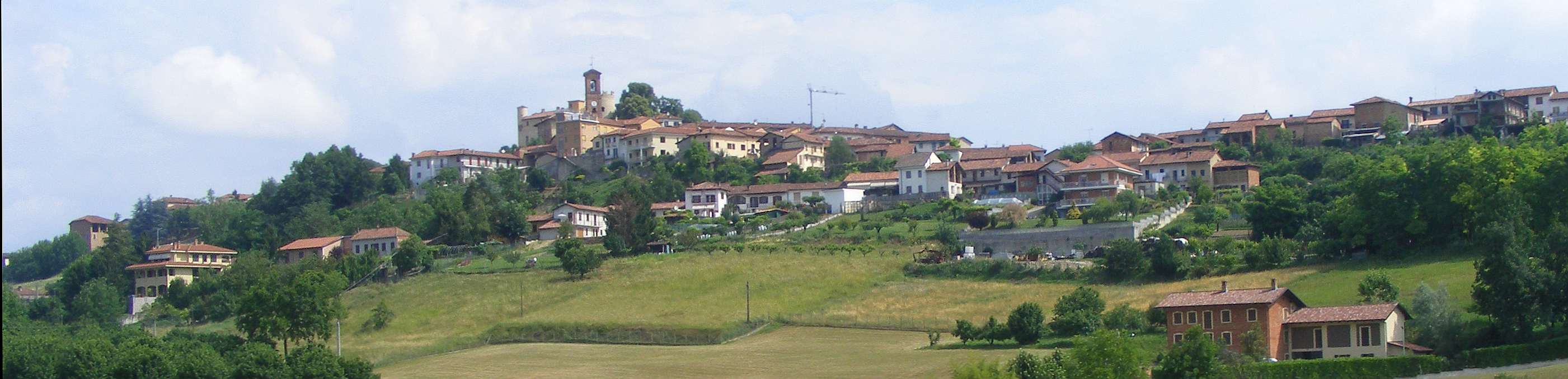
- View of Cortanze

- Coat of arms

- Location within Italy Location within Piedmont
- Coordinates: 45°1′N 8°5′E
- Country: Italy
- Region: Piedmont
- Province: Asti (AT)
- Frazioni: Roera, San Rocco

Government
  - Mayor: Marco Gattiglia

Area
  - Total: 4.5 km^{2} (1.7 sq mi)
- Elevation: 299 m (981 ft)

Population (31 January 2024)
  - Total: 258
  - Density: 57/km^{2} (150/sq mi)
- Demonym: Cortanzesi
- Time zone: UTC+1 (CET)
  - Summer (DST): UTC+2 (CEST)
- Postal code: 14020
- Dialing code: 0141

Cortanze is a comune (municipality) in the Province of Asti in the Italian region Piedmont, located about 30 kilometres (19 mi) east of Turin and about 15 kilometres (9 mi) northwest of Asti. As of 31 january 2024, it had a population of 258 and an area of 4.5 square kilometres (1.7 mi^{2}).

The municipality of Cortanze contains the frazioni (subdivisions, mainly villages and hamlets) Roera and San Rocco.

Cortanze borders the following municipalities: Cunico, Montechiaro d’Asti, Piea, Soglio, and Viale.
