= Azzano d'Asti =

- Comune
- Comune di Azzano d'Asti
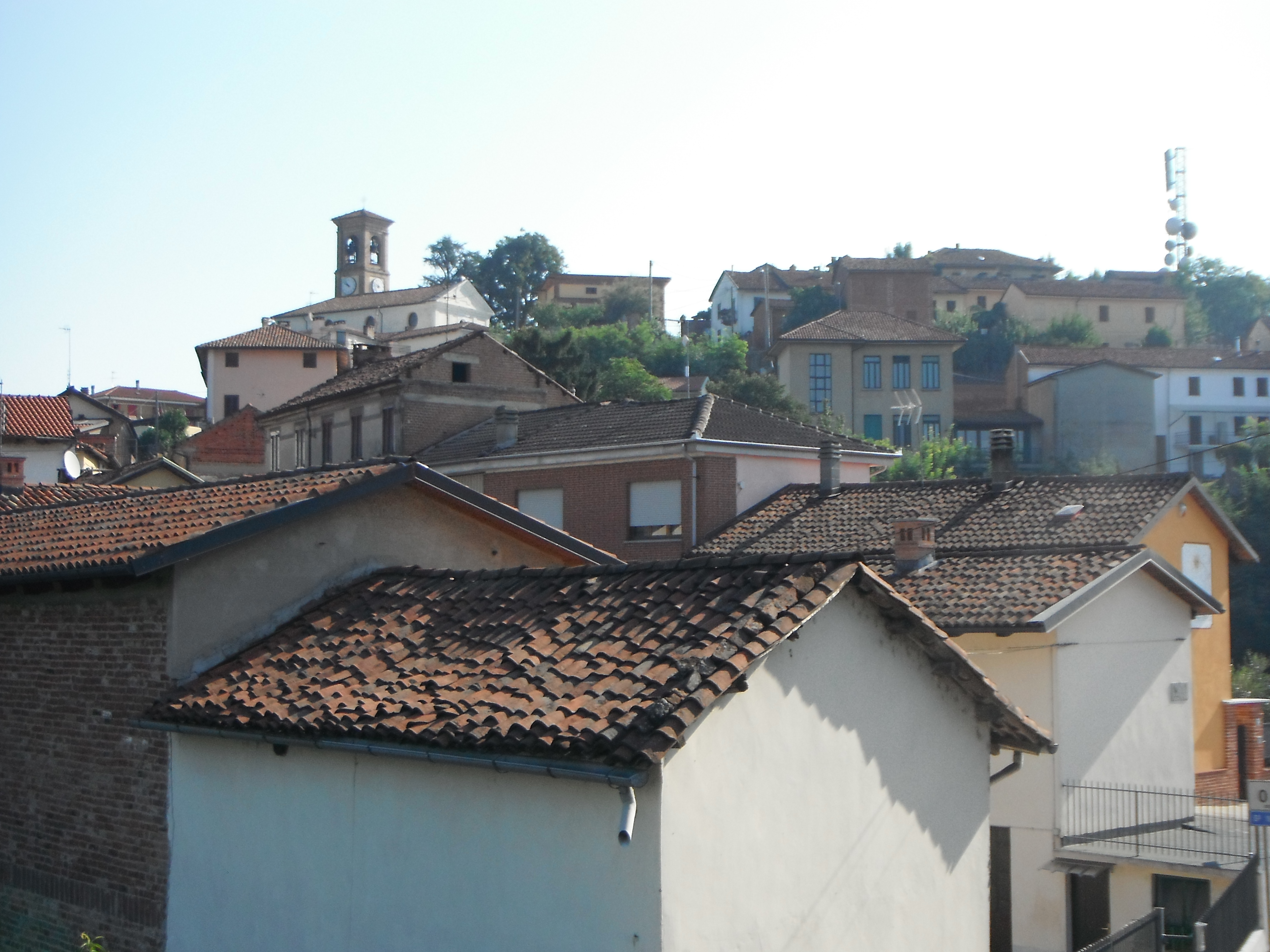
- View of Azzano d'Asti

- Coat of arms

- Location within Italy Location within Piedmont
- Coordinates: 44°52′N 8°16′E
- Country: Italy
- Region: Piedmont
- Province: Asti (AT)

Government
  - Mayor: Roberto Cussotto

Area
  - Total: 6.43 km^{2} (2.48 sq mi)
- Elevation: 216 m (709 ft)

Population (40 April 2017)
  - Total: 393
  - Density: 61.1/km^{2} (158/sq mi)
- Time zone: UTC+1 (CET)
  - Summer (DST): UTC+2 (CEST)
- Postal code: 14030
- Dialing code: 0141
- Website: Official website

Azzano d'Asti is a comune (municipality) in the Province of Asti in the Italian region Piedmont, located about 50 kilometres (31 mi) southeast of Turin and about 6 kilometres (4 mi) southeast of Asti.

Azzano d'Asti borders the following municipalities: Asti and Rocca d'Arazzo.
