= Monale =

- Comune
- Comune di Monale
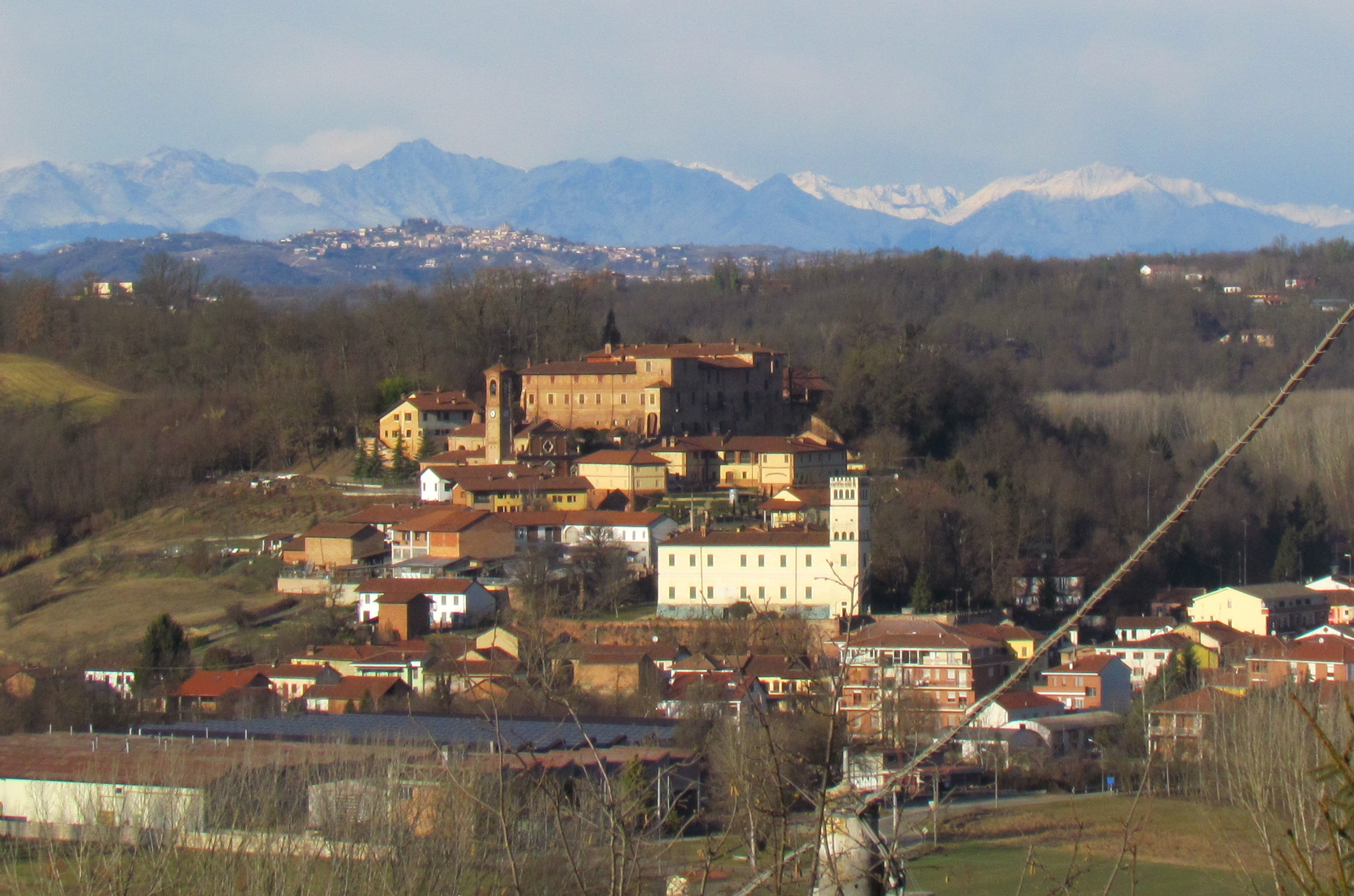
- View of Monale

- Coat of arms

- Location within Italy Location within Piedmont
- Coordinates: 44°56′N 8°4′E
- Country: Italy
- Region: Piedmont
- Province: Province of Asti (AT)

Area
  - Total: 9.1 km^{2} (3.5 sq mi)

Population (Dec. 2004)
  - Total: 948
  - Density: 100/km^{2} (270/sq mi)
- Time zone: UTC+1 (CET)
  - Summer (DST): UTC+2 (CEST)
- Postal code: 14013
- Dialing code: 0141

Monale is a comune (municipality) in the Province of Asti in the Italian region Piedmont, located about 30 kilometres (19 mi) southeast of Turin and about 11 kilometres (7 mi) northwest of Asti. As of 31 December 2004, it had a population of 948 and an area of 9.1 square kilometres (3.5 mi^{2}).

Monale borders the following municipalities: Asti, Baldichieri d'Asti, Castellero, Cinaglio, Cortandone, Maretto, and Villafranca d'Asti.

== Demographic evolution ==
Historical population

Year	Pop.	±%
1861	1,001	—
1871	1,020	+1.9%
1881	1,046	+2.5%
1901	1,198	+14.5%
1911	1,219	+1.8%

Year	Pop.	±%
1921	1,159	−4.9%
1931	1,034	−10.8%
1936	1,042	+0.8%
1951	877	−15.8%
1961	772	−12.0%

Year	Pop.	±%
1971	792	+2.6%
1981	867	+9.5%
1991	843	−2.8%
2001	892	+5.8%

Source: Data from ISTAT

== Twin towns ==
Monale is twinned with:

- Cazouls-d'Hérault, France (2010)
