= Tigliole =

- Comune
- Comune di Tigliole
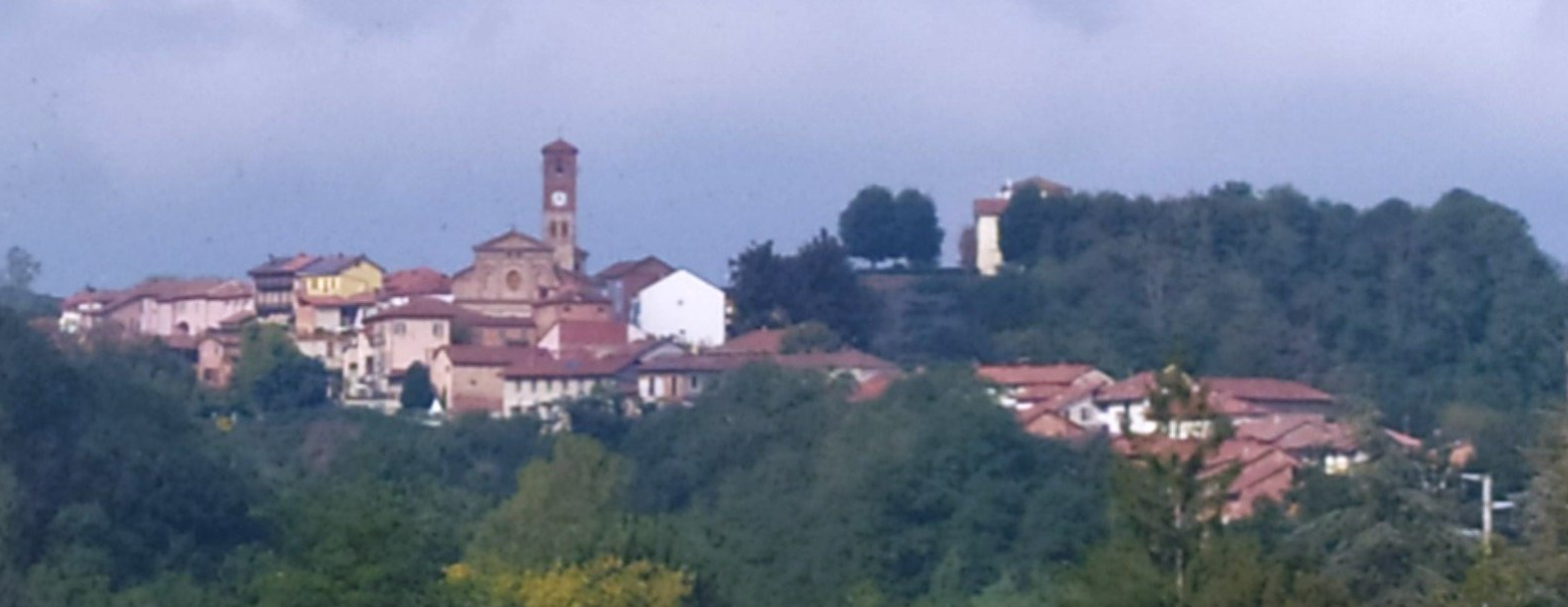

- Coat of arms

- Location within Italy Location within Piedmont
- Coordinates: 44°53′N 8°5′E
- Country: Italy
- Region: Piedmont
- Province: Province of Asti (AT)
- Frazioni: Valperosa, Pocola, Pratomorone, Remondini, San Carlo

Government
  - Mayor: Daniele Basso

Area
  - Total: 16.1 km^{2} (6.2 sq mi)
- Elevation: 239 m (784 ft)

Population (Dec. 2004)
  - Total: 1,676
  - Density: 104/km^{2} (270/sq mi)
- Demonym: Tigliolesi
- Time zone: UTC+1 (CET)
  - Summer (DST): UTC+2 (CEST)
- Postal code: 14016
- Dialing code: 0141
- Website: Official website

Tigliole is a comune (municipality) in the Province of Asti in the Italian region Piedmont, located about 35 kilometres (22 mi) southeast of Turin and about 9 kilometres (6 mi) west of Asti. As of 31 December 2004, it had a population of 1,676 and an area of 16.1 square kilometres (6.2 mi^{2}).

The municipality of Tigliole contains the frazioni (subdivisions, mainly villages and hamlets) Valperosa, Pocola, Pratomorone, Remondini, and San Carlo.

Tigliole borders the following municipalities: Asti, Baldichieri d'Asti, Cantarana, San Damiano d'Asti, and Villafranca d'Asti.

== Demographic evolution ==
Historical population

Year	Pop.	±%
1861	2,649	—
1871	2,888	+9.0%
1881	2,977	+3.1%
1901	3,559	+19.5%
1911	3,444	−3.2%

Year	Pop.	±%
1921	3,153	−8.4%
1931	2,789	−11.5%
1936	2,541	−8.9%
1951	2,213	−12.9%
1961	1,821	−17.7%

Year	Pop.	±%
1971	1,523	−16.4%
1981	1,479	−2.9%
1991	1,489	+0.7%
2001	1,605	+7.8%

Source: Data from ISTAT
