= Pino d'Asti =

- Comune
- Comune di Pino d'Asti
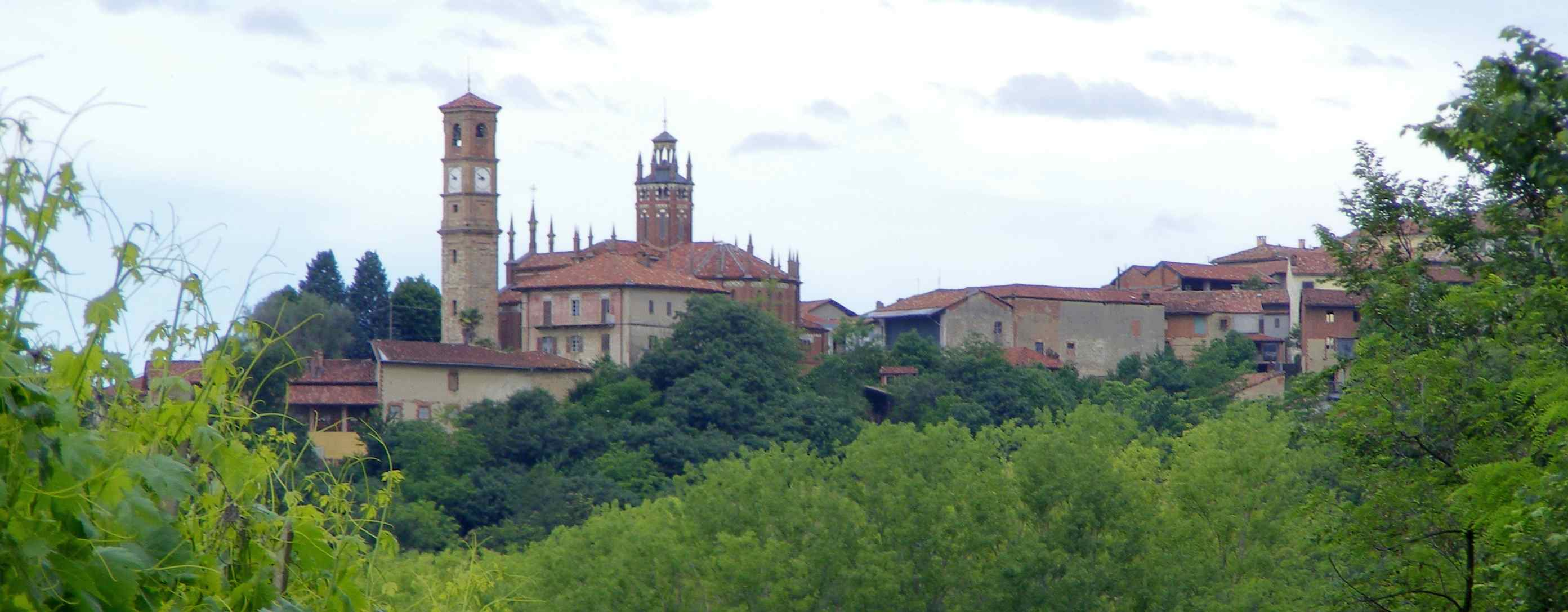

- Location within Italy Location within Piedmont
- Coordinates: 45°3′N 7°59′E
- Country: Italy
- Region: Piedmont
- Province: Asti (AT)

Government
  - Mayor: Daniela Delmastro

Area
  - Total: 4.1 km^{2} (1.6 sq mi)
- Elevation: 412 m (1,352 ft)

Population (31 December 2010)
  - Total: 242
  - Density: 59/km^{2} (150/sq mi)
- Demonym: Pinesi
- Time zone: UTC+1 (CET)
  - Summer (DST): UTC+2 (CEST)
- Postal code: 14020
- Dialing code: 011
- Website: Official website

Pino d'Asti is a comune (municipality) in the Province of Asti in the Italian region Piedmont, located about 20 kilometres (12 mi) east of Turin and about 25 kilometres (16 mi) northwest of Asti.

Pino d'Asti borders the following municipalities: Albugnano, Castelnuovo Don Bosco, and Passerano Marmorito.
