= Buttigliera d'Asti =

- Comune
- Comune di Buttigliera d'Asti
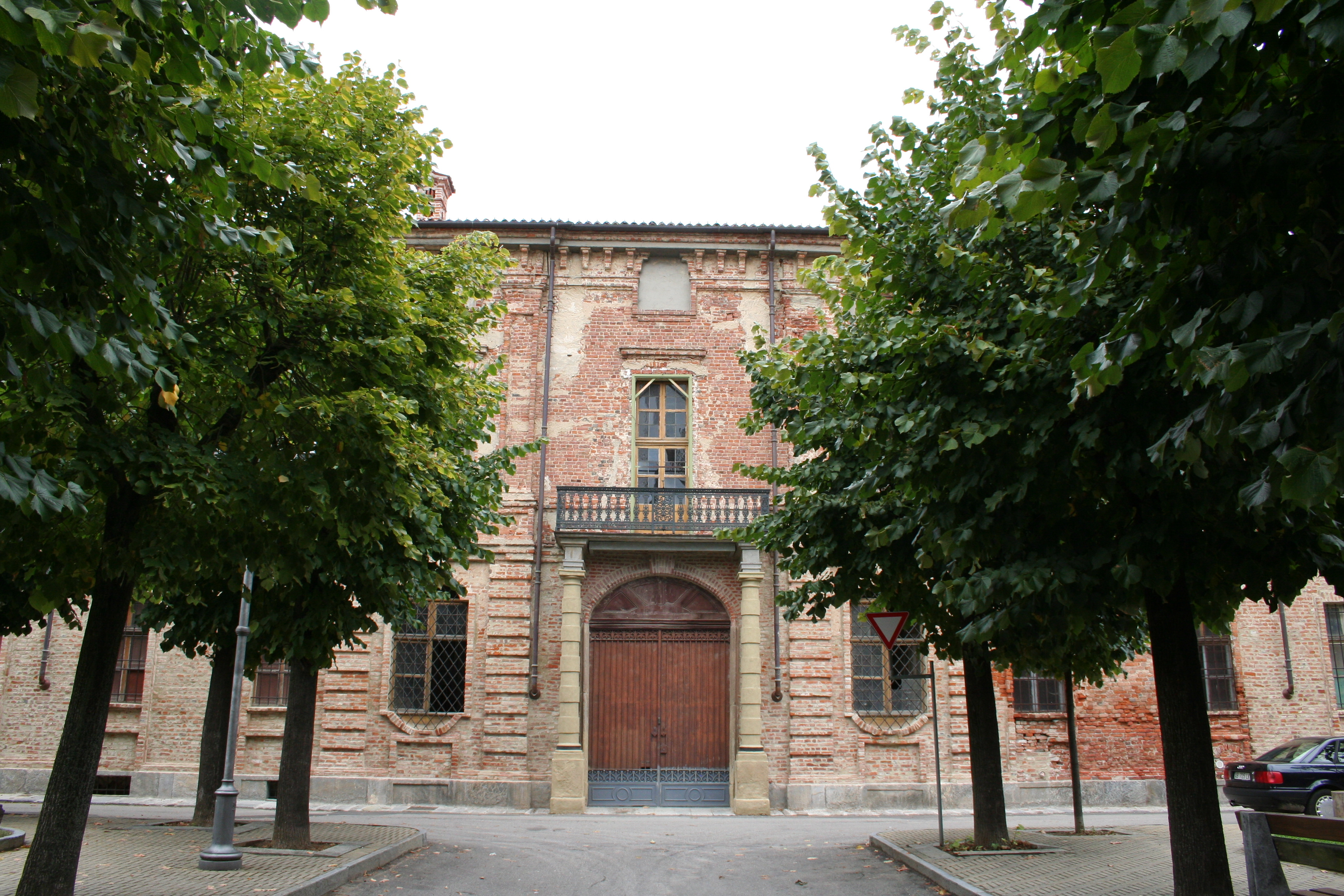
- View of Buttigliera d'Asti

- Coat of arms

- Location within Italy Location within Piedmont
- Coordinates: 45°1′N 7°57′E
- Country: Italy
- Region: Piedmont
- Province: Asti (AT)
- Frazioni: Crivelle, Serra

Government
  - Mayor: Roberto Bechis

Area
  - Total: 18.8 km^{2} (7.3 sq mi)
- Elevation: 299 m (981 ft)

Population (31 December 2010)
  - Total: 2,512
  - Density: 134/km^{2} (346/sq mi)
- Demonym: Buttiglieresi
- Time zone: UTC+1 (CET)
  - Summer (DST): UTC+2 (CEST)
- Postal code: 14021
- Dialing code: 011
- Website: Official website

Buttigliera d'Asti is a comune (municipality) in the Province of Asti in the Italian region Piedmont, located about 20 kilometres (12 mi) southeast of Turin and about 25 kilometres (16 mi) northwest of Asti.
