= Cinaglio =

- Comune
- Comune di Cinaglio
- Coat of arms

- Location within Italy Location within Piedmont
- Coordinates: 44°58′N 8°6′E
- Country: Italy
- Region: Piedmont
- Province: Province of Asti (AT)

Government
  - Mayor: Flavio Miniscalco (L'impegno comune)

Area
  - Total: 5.4 km^{2} (2.1 sq mi)

Population (Dec. 2019)
  - Total: 450
  - Density: 83/km^{2} (220/sq mi)
- Demonym: Cinagliesi
- Time zone: UTC+1 (CET)
  - Summer (DST): UTC+2 (CEST)
- Postal code: 14020
- Dialing code: 0141
- Patron saint: Felix of Valois
- Saint day: 20 November
- Website: Official website

Cinaglio is a comune (municipality) in the Province of Asti in the Italian region Piedmont, located about 35 kilometres (22 mi) southeast of Turin and about 11 kilometres (7 mi) northwest of Asti. As of 31 December 2004, it had a population of 470 and an area of 5.4 square kilometres (2.1 mi^{2}).

Cinaglio borders the following municipalities: Asti, Camerano Casasco, Chiusano d'Asti, Cortandone, Monale, and Settime.

== History ==
The village today stands on top of a hill, but in ancient times it had to be placed further downstream. The first news of Cinaglio, whose name seems to derive from the Latin cenaculum, in the meaning of "hotel", "inn", i.e. place of rest on the road connecting Hasta with Industry, date back to Roman times.

In 962 he was assigned to the bishop of Asti by Emperor Otto I.

In 1198, according to the Codex Astensis, Cinaglio is included in the territories subject to Asti and its jurisdiction. It became a free commune in 1383 and was included in the endowment of Valentina Visconti shortly afterwards, under the rule of the Orleans.

The pacts agreed by the Community with the Visconti in 1383 were the basis of the events of the territory for about two centuries.

With the passage of Asti to the Duchy of Savoy (1531), Cinaglio also lost the privileges he had enjoyed under the Visconti. Only in 1560 did it regain the recognition of its franchises, reconfirmed by Charles Emmanuel I in 1587. Being "free land" Cinaglio was not subjected by any feudal lord until the early seventeenth century. In 1619 the county of Chiusano-Cinaglio was established and assigned to the Caissotti family. With the Napoleonic domination it was part of the Tanaro department.

Only after the restoration and the return of Vittorio Emanuele I, the province of Asti was reconstituted, then suppressed with the unification of Italy. From then until 1935, Cinaglio was part of the province of Alessandria.

== Symbols ==
The coat of arms and the banner of the Municipality of Cinaglio were granted by decree of the President of the Republic of 2 December 1998.

== Main sights ==
Among the religious buildings we remember:

- the Parish Church of Saints Felice and Giorgio, baroque building with brick facade
- the ancient Church of San Felice near the cemetery, built in the thirteenth century in Romanesque forms, with exposed brick walls

In the concentric, one can find the gipsoteca "E. Gonetto," holding a rich collection of chalks of artistic character with copies of masterpieces from antiquity to the modern era. Just outside the center, we find the locality Gorghi. Its naturalistic and paleontological point of views are found in the its "Astian" period yellow sands, which preserved the fossil remains of marine and terrestrial animals.

In the long walks in the natural park it is not uncommon to meet the hawk, woodpecker, jay and many other wild animals. Part of the territory of the municipality is included in the Special Nature Reserve of the Andona Valley, Botto Valley and Val Grande.

== Demographic evolution ==
Historical population

Year	Pop.	±%
1861	863	—
1871	894	+3.6%
1881	967	+8.2%
1901	983	+1.7%
1911	1,085	+10.4%

Year	Pop.	±%
1921	1,019	−6.1%
1931	918	−9.9%
1936	860	−6.3%
1951	654	−24.0%
1961	533	−18.5%

Year	Pop.	±%
1971	451	−15.4%
1981	429	−4.9%
1991	426	−0.7%
2001	459	+7.7%

Source: Data from ISTAT

== Food ==
The gastronomic specialty is represented by the "canestrelli" packaged in waffles, with a special plate.

== Events ==
During the feast of St. Felice, which is celebrated today on the last Sunday of August, but which originally was the third of November, in the afternoon there is the Canestrello Festival: a gastronomic tournament of the historical recipe. The event sees in 2006 the first re-edition following a suspension lasting about twenty years. All families compete bringing their own recipe of canestrelli in front of a jury of "illustrious" tasters who will conclude the winner of the year by giving the winner a generous cash prize.
