= Cossombrato =

- Comune
- Comune di Cossombrato
- Coat of arms

- Location within Italy Location within Piedmont
- Coordinates: 45°0′N 8°8′E
- Country: Italy
- Region: Piedmont
- Province: Province of Asti (AT)

Area
  - Total: 5.3 km^{2} (2.0 sq mi)

Population (Dec. 2004)
  - Total: 493
  - Density: 93/km^{2} (240/sq mi)
- Time zone: UTC+1 (CET)
  - Summer (DST): UTC+2 (CEST)
- Postal code: 14020
- Dialing code: 0141
- Website: Official website

Cossombrato is a comune (municipality) in the Province of Asti in the Italian region Piedmont, located about 35 kilometres (22 mi) east of Turin and about 12 kilometres (7 mi) northwest of Asti. As of 31 December 2004, it had a population of 493 and an area of 5.3 square kilometres (2.0 mi^{2}).

Cossombrato borders the following municipalities: Asti, Castell'Alfero, Chiusano d'Asti, Corsione, Montechiaro d'Asti, and Villa San Secondo.

== Demographic evolution ==
Historical population

Year	Pop.	±%
1861	836	—
1871	1,026	+22.7%
1881	1,135	+10.6%
1901	1,128	−0.6%
1911	1,121	−0.6%

Year	Pop.	±%
1921	958	−14.5%
1931	876	−8.6%
1936	845	−3.5%
1951	649	−23.2%
1961	522	−19.6%

Year	Pop.	±%
1971	396	−24.1%
1981	354	−10.6%
1991	426	+20.3%
2001	488	+14.6%

Source: Data from ISTAT
