= Chiusano d'Asti =

- Comune
- Comune di Chiusano d'Asti
- Location within Italy Location within Piedmont
- Coordinates: 44°59′N 8°7′E
- Country: Italy
- Region: Piedmont
- Province: Province of Asti (AT)

Area
  - Total: 2.5 km^{2} (0.97 sq mi)

Population (Dec. 2004)
  - Total: 236
  - Density: 94/km^{2} (240/sq mi)
- Time zone: UTC+1 (CET)
  - Summer (DST): UTC+2 (CEST)
- Postal code: 14025
- Dialing code: 0141
- Website: Official website

Chiusano d'Asti is a comune (municipality) in the Province of Asti in the Italian region Piedmont, located about 35 kilometres (22 mi) southeast of Turin and about 11 kilometres (7 mi) northwest of Asti. As of 31 December 2004, it had a population of 236 and an area of 2.5 square kilometres (0.97 mi^{2}).

Chiusano d'Asti borders the following municipalities: Asti, Camerano Casasco, Cinaglio, Cossombrato, Montechiaro d'Asti, and Settime.

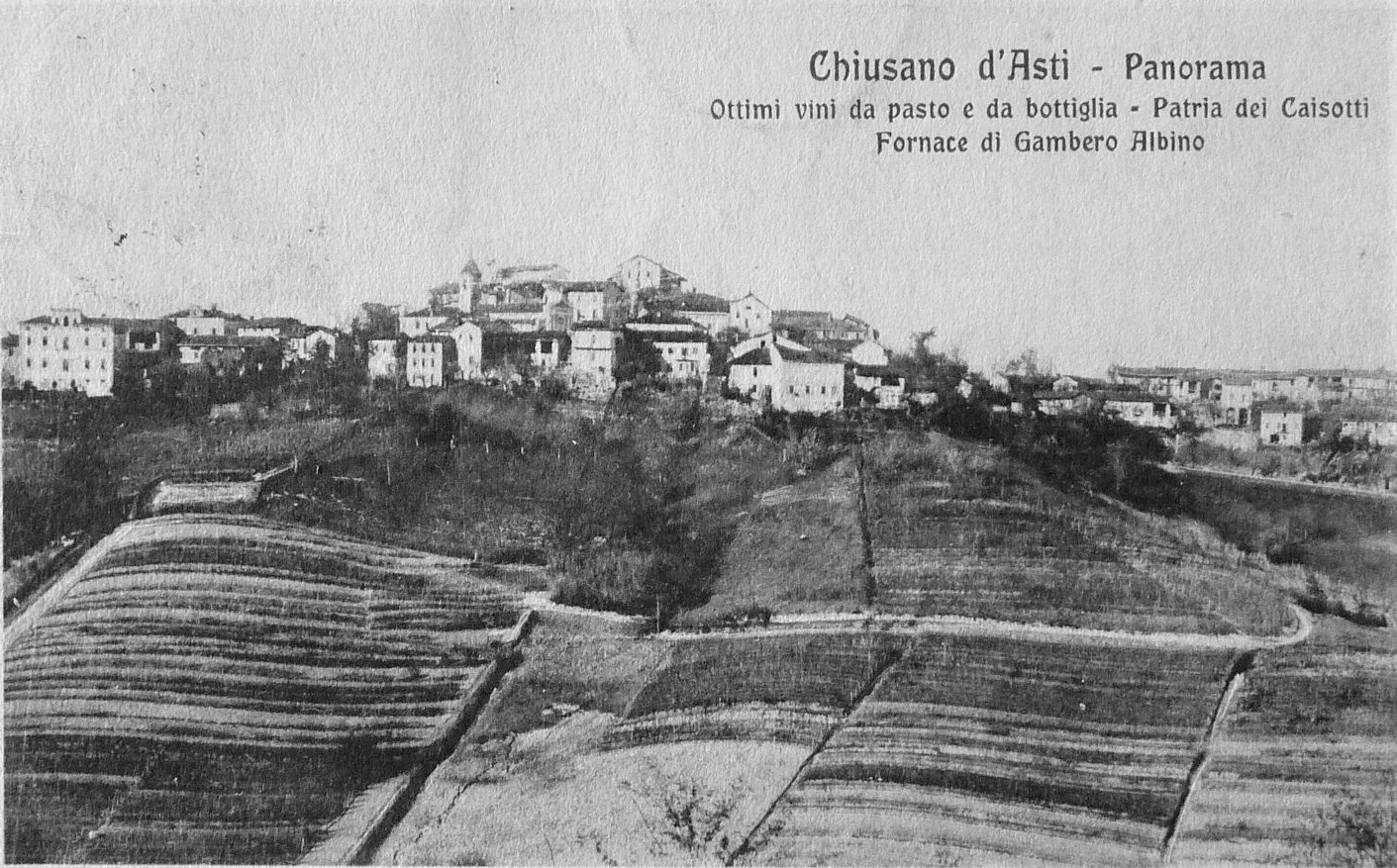
postcard sent from Chiusano d'Asti, 1923

== Demographic evolution ==
Historical population

Year	Pop.	±%
1861	602	—
1871	612	+1.7%
1881	573	−6.4%
1901	587	+2.4%
1911	527	−10.2%

Year	Pop.	±%
1921	518	−1.7%
1931	442	−14.7%
1936	401	−9.3%
1951	328	−18.2%
1961	282	−14.0%

Year	Pop.	±%
1971	234	−17.0%
1981	213	−9.0%
1991	255	+19.7%
2001	254	−0.4%

Source: Data from ISTAT
