= Settime =

- Comune
- Comune di Settime
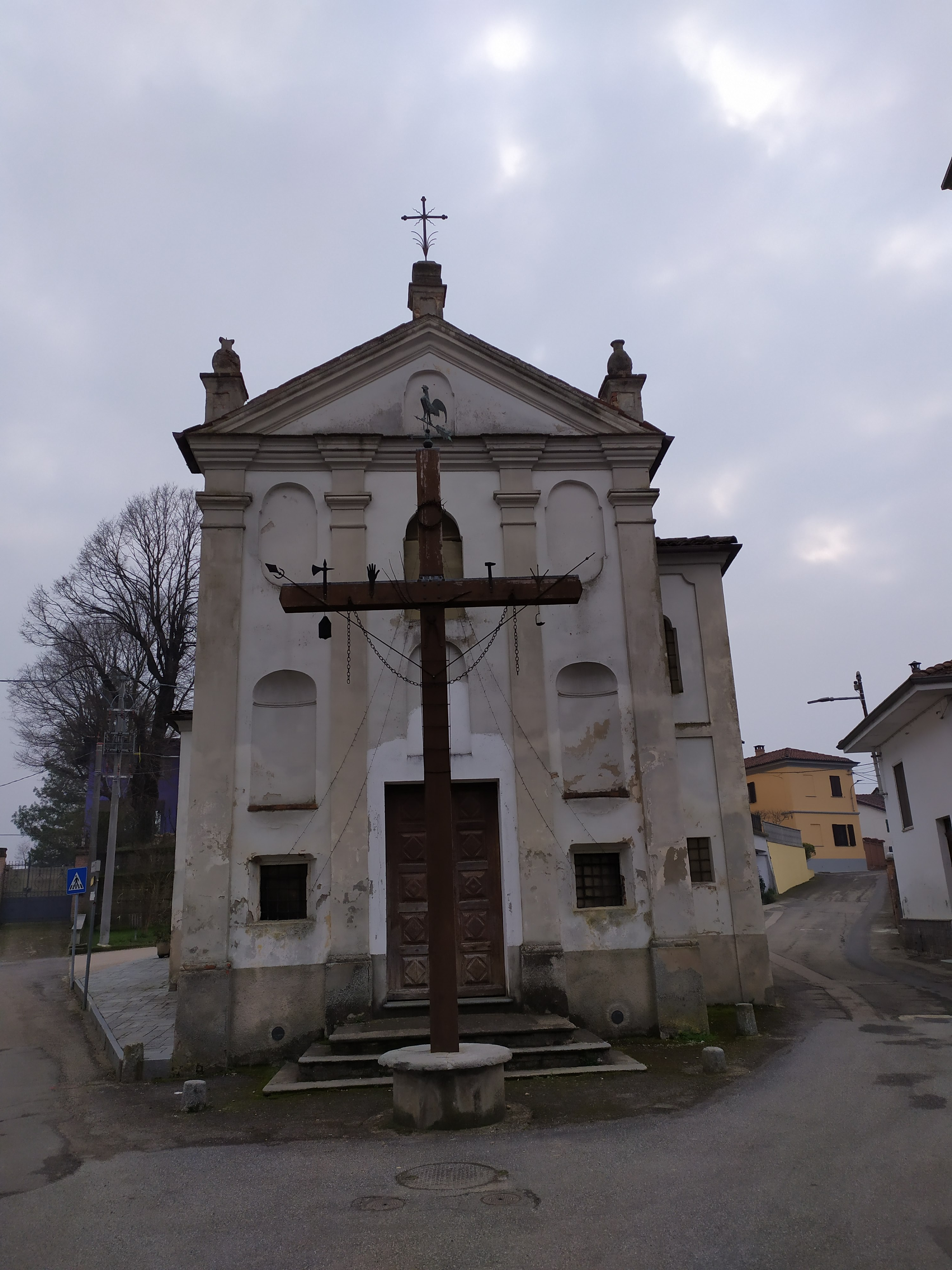

- Coat of arms

- Location within Italy Location within Piedmont
- Coordinates: 44°58′N 8°7′E
- Country: Italy
- Region: Piedmont
- Province: Province of Asti (AT)

Area
  - Total: 6.7 km^{2} (2.6 sq mi)

Population (Dec. 2004)
  - Total: 561
  - Density: 84/km^{2} (220/sq mi)
- Time zone: UTC+1 (CET)
  - Summer (DST): UTC+2 (CEST)
- Postal code: 14020
- Dialing code: 0141
- Website: Official website

Settime is a comune (municipality) in the Province of Asti in the Italian region Piedmont, located about 35 kilometres (22 mi) southeast of Turin and about 10 kilometres (6 mi) northwest of Asti. As of 31 December 2004, it had a population of 561 and an area of 6.7 square kilometres (2.6 mi^{2}).

Settime borders the following municipalities: Asti, Chiusano d'Asti, and Cinaglio.

== Demographic evolution ==
Historical population

Year	Pop.	±%
1861	936	—
1871	912	−2.6%
1881	936	+2.6%
1901	1,136	+21.4%
1911	1,079	−5.0%

Year	Pop.	±%
1921	1,024	−5.1%
1931	946	−7.6%
1936	877	−7.3%
1951	746	−14.9%
1961	556	−25.5%

Year	Pop.	±%
1971	505	−9.2%
1981	505	+0.0%
1991	520	+3.0%
2001	537	+3.3%

Source: Data from ISTAT
