= Montechiaro d'Asti =

- Comune
- Comune di Montechiaro d'Asti
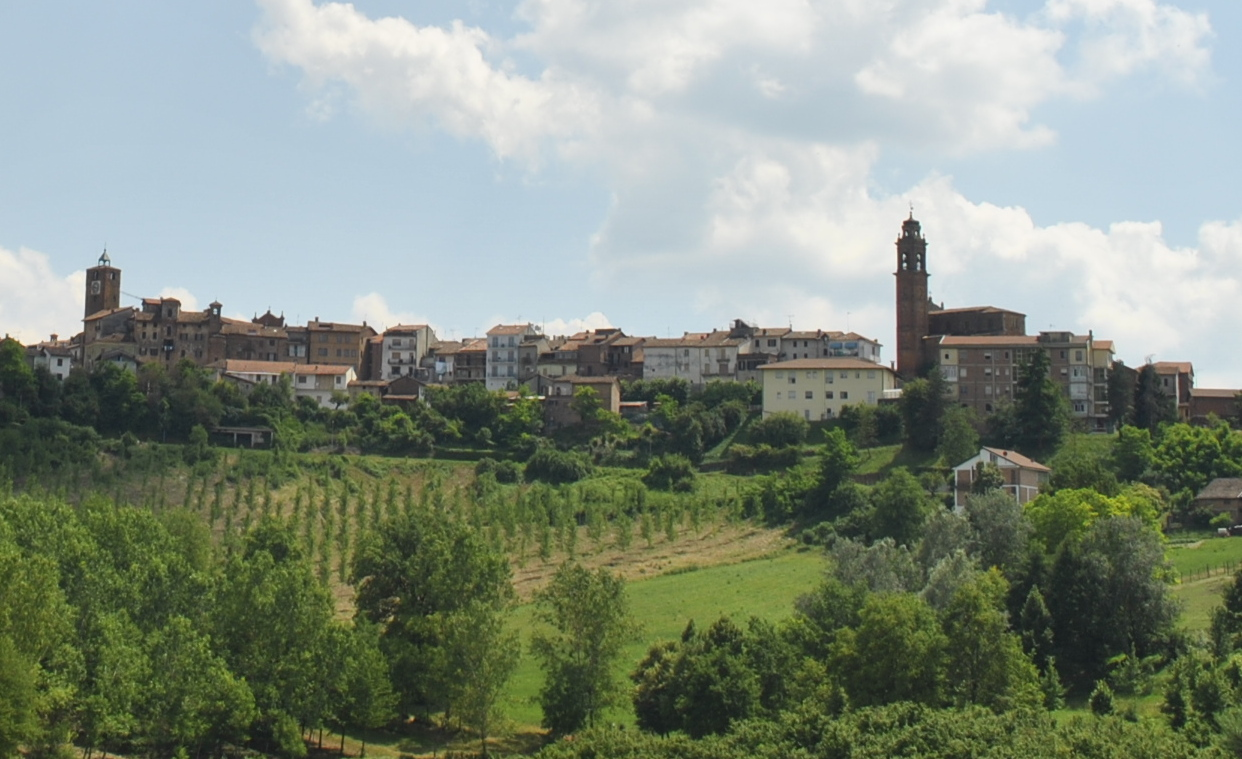
- View of Montechiaro d'Asti

- Coat of arms

- Location within Italy Location within Piedmont
- Coordinates: 45°0′N 8°7′E
- Country: Italy
- Region: Piedmont
- Province: Asti (AT)
- Frazioni: Nocciola, Regione Reale

Government
  - Mayor: Paolo Luzi

Area
  - Total: 10.14 km^{2} (3.92 sq mi)
- Elevation: 292 m (958 ft)

Population (31 May 2007)
  - Total: 1,409
  - Density: 139.0/km^{2} (359.9/sq mi)
- Demonym: Montechiaresi
- Time zone: UTC+1 (CET)
  - Summer (DST): UTC+2 (CEST)
- Postal code: 14025
- Dialing code: 0141
- Patron saint: St. Bernard of Clairvaux
- Saint day: August 20
- Website: Official website

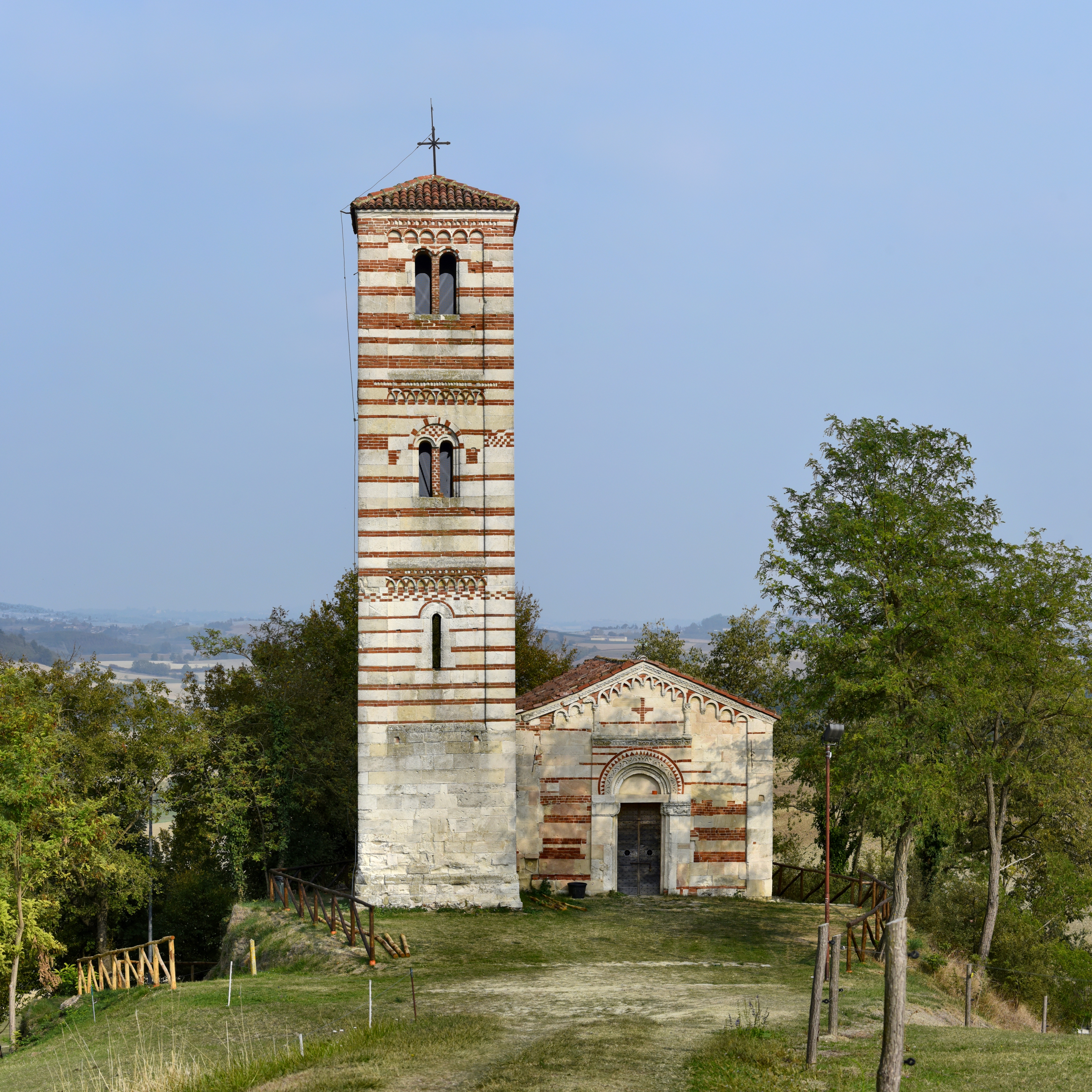
church of St. Nazarius and Celsus

Montechiaro d'Asti (Piedmontese: Monciàir) is a town and comune (municipality) in the Province of Asti in the Italian region Piedmont, located about 35 kilometres (22 mi) east of Turin and about 13 kilometres (8 mi) northwest of Asti.

Montechiaro d'Asti borders the following municipalities: Camerano Casasco, Chiusano d'Asti, Cortanze, Cossombrato, Cunico, Montiglio Monferrato, Soglio, and Villa San Secondo.

Montechiaro is home to a notable example of Romanesque architecture in the Lower Montferrat, the church of St. Nazarius and Celsus (11th and 12th centuries). In Montechiaro is based ACS Cycling Chirio–Casa Giani, a professional cycling team based.

== Notable people ==
- Ezio Borgo (1922-2006), football player
- Giovanni Pastrone, also known as Piero Fosco (1883–1959), pioneer of Italian film.

== Twin towns ==
- Finale Ligure, Italy
