= Cortazzone =

- Comune
- Comune di Cortazzone
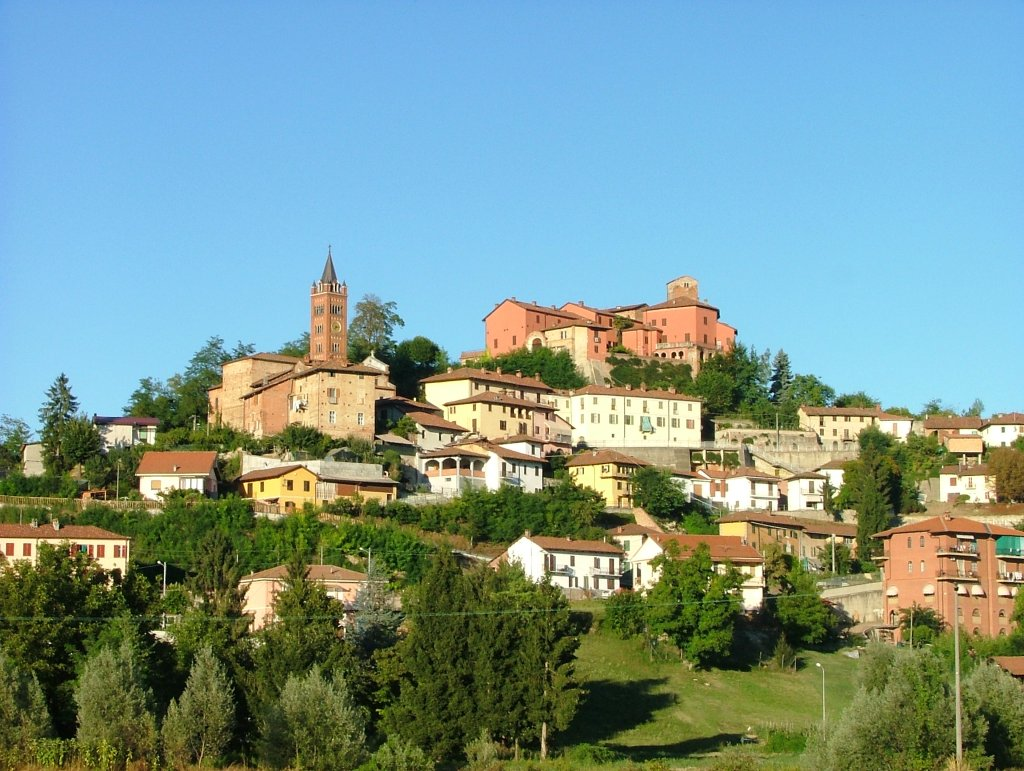
- View of Cortazzone

- Coat of arms

- Location within Italy Location within Piedmont
- Coordinates: 44°59′N 8°4′E
- Country: Italy
- Region: Piedmont
- Province: Asti (AT)
- Frazioni: Briccarello, Mongiglietto, Valmezzana, Vanara

Government
  - Mayor: Federico Tollio

Area
  - Total: 10.4 km^{2} (4.0 sq mi)
- Elevation: 225 m (738 ft)

Population (31 january 2024)
  - Total: 594
  - Density: 57.1/km^{2} (148/sq mi)
- Demonym: Cortazzonesi
- Time zone: UTC+1 (CET)
  - Summer (DST): UTC+2 (CEST)
- Postal code: 14010
- Dialing code: 0141
- Website: Official website

Cortazzone is a comune (municipality) in the Province of Asti in the Italian region Piedmont, located about 30 kilometres (19 mi) southeast of Turin and about 14 kilometres (9 mi) northwest of Asti.

== Main sights ==
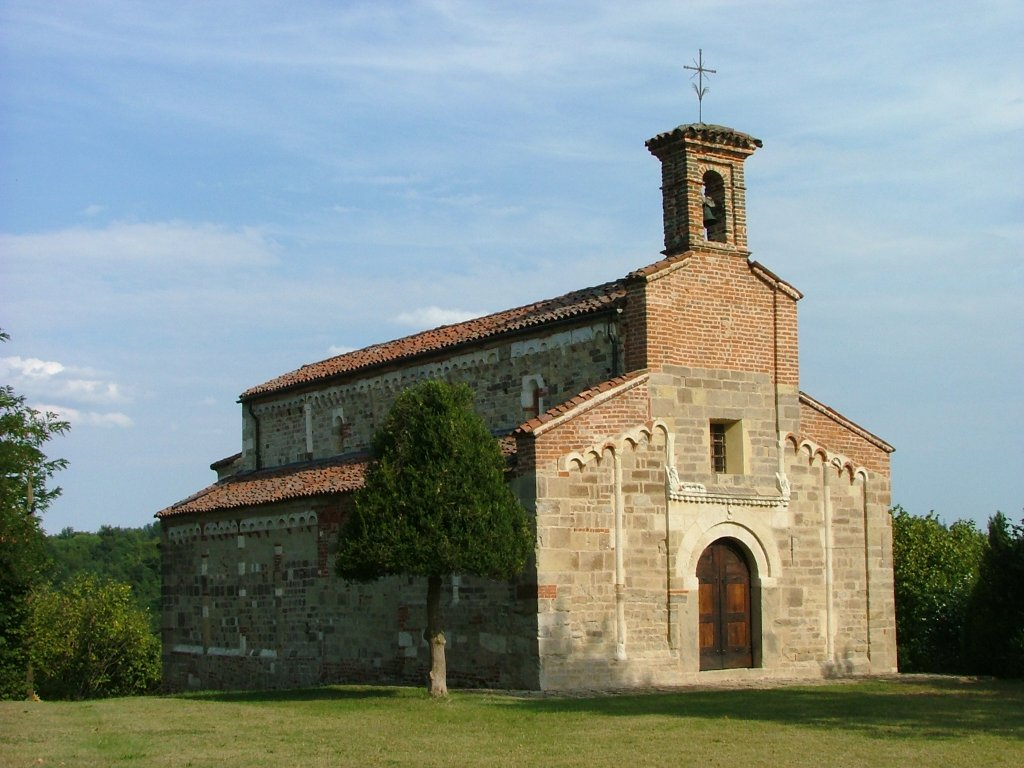
The Romanesque Church of San Secondo at Mongiglietto Hill.

The Romanesque church of San Secondo di Cortazzone is located on the hill of the last, about a kilometre west of the main centre of population. Dating from the 11th century, it is regarded as one of the most significant examples of medieval architecture in the Basso Monferrato. It is included in a well known tourist route called "Percorso del Romanico Astigiano" together with Vezzolano Abbey and San Nazario & Celso chapel in Montechiaro d'Asti, among others.
