= Piea =

- Comune
- Comune di Piea
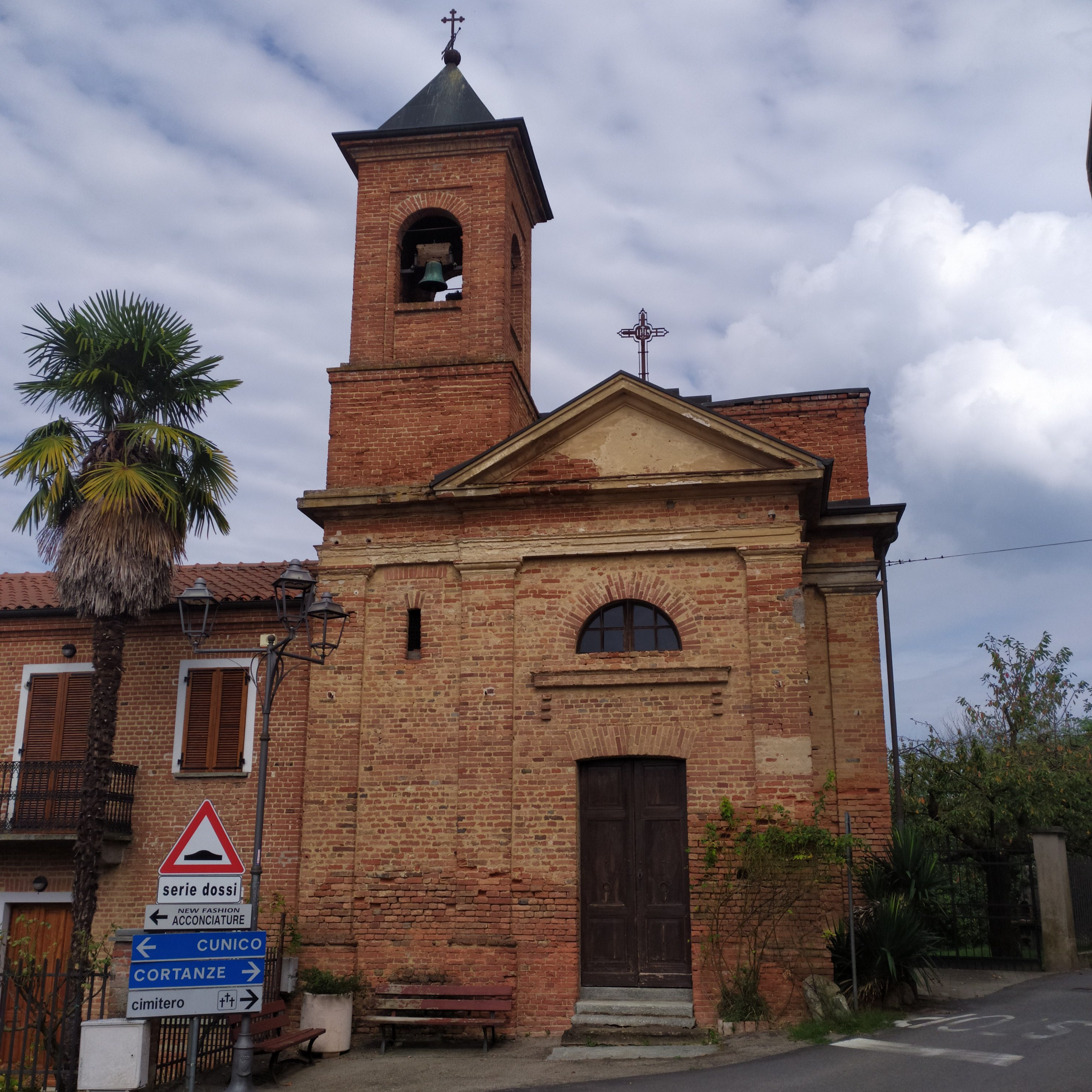

- Coat of arms

- Location within Italy Location within Piedmont
- Coordinates: 45°2′N 8°4′E
- Country: Italy
- Region: Piedmont
- Province: Asti (AT)
- Frazioni: Primparino, San Grato, Vallia, Vallunga, Varandone, Vaccarito, Caffarotto, Rodino, San Secondo, Ingazzo, Chiusa

Government
  - Mayor: Alessandro Borgo (since 2024)

Area
  - Total: 8.89 km^{2} (3.43 sq mi)
- Elevation: 275 m (902 ft)

Population (31 january 2024)
  - Total: 508
  - Density: 57.1/km^{2} (148/sq mi)
- Demonym: Pieesi
- Time zone: UTC+1 (CET)
  - Summer (DST): UTC+2 (CEST)
- Postal code: 14020
- Dialing code: 0141
- Patron saint: Saint Philip and Saint James the Less
- Saint day: 3 may
- Website: Official website

Piea is a comune (municipality) in the Province of Asti in the Italian region Piedmont, located about 30 kilometres (19 mi) east of Turin and about 20 kilometres (12 mi) northwest of Asti.
