= Vaglierano =

- Frazione
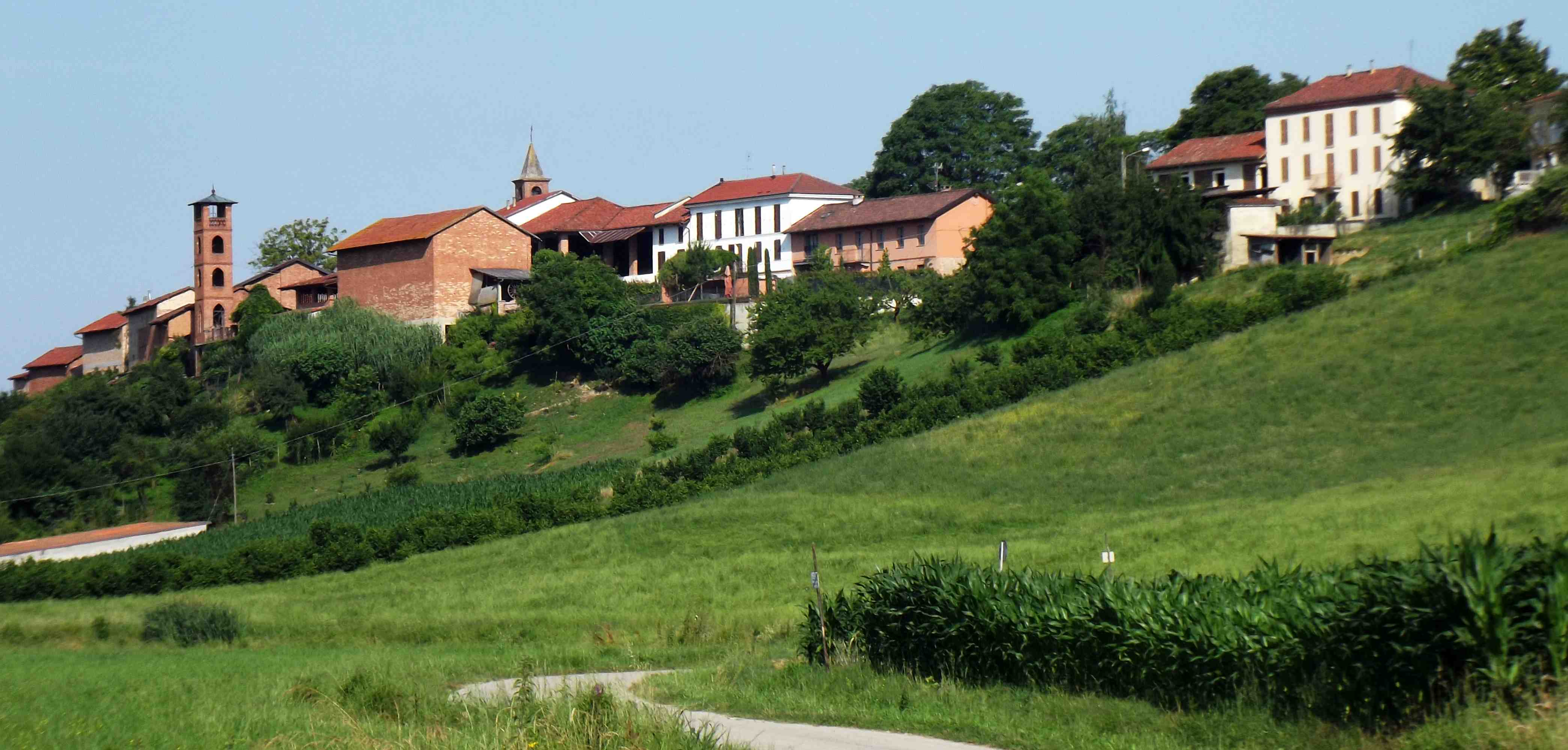
- Panoramic view

- Location of Vaglierano in Italy
- Coordinates: 44°52′20″N 8°8′12″E
- Country: Italy
- Region: Piedmont
- Province: Province of Asti (AT)
- Comune: Asti
- Elevation: 192 m (630 ft)
- Time zone: UTC+1 (CET)
  - Summer (DST): UTC+2 (CEST)
- Postal code: 14100
- Dialing code: (+39) 0141

Vaglierano is a frazione (and parish) of the municipality of Asti, in Piedmont, northern Italy.

== Overview ==
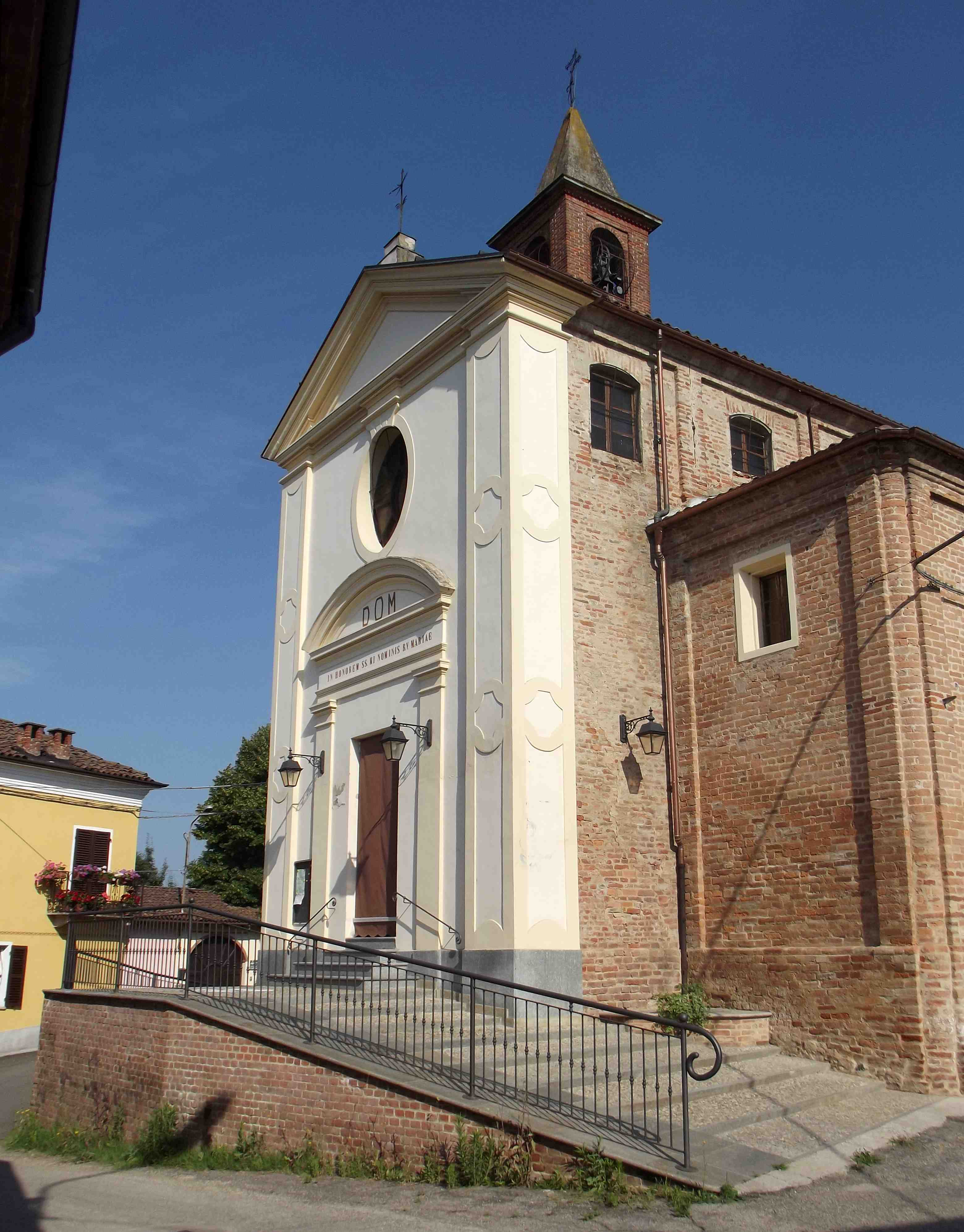
Parish church of Santa Maria de horticis

It is a village on a hill between the valleys of Borbore and Tanaro.

== History ==
Since 1929 Vaglierano was a separate comune; in that year it was aggregated to the municipality of Asti by the Royal charter n. 736 of March 28, 1929.
