= Castellero =

- Comune
- Comune di Castellero
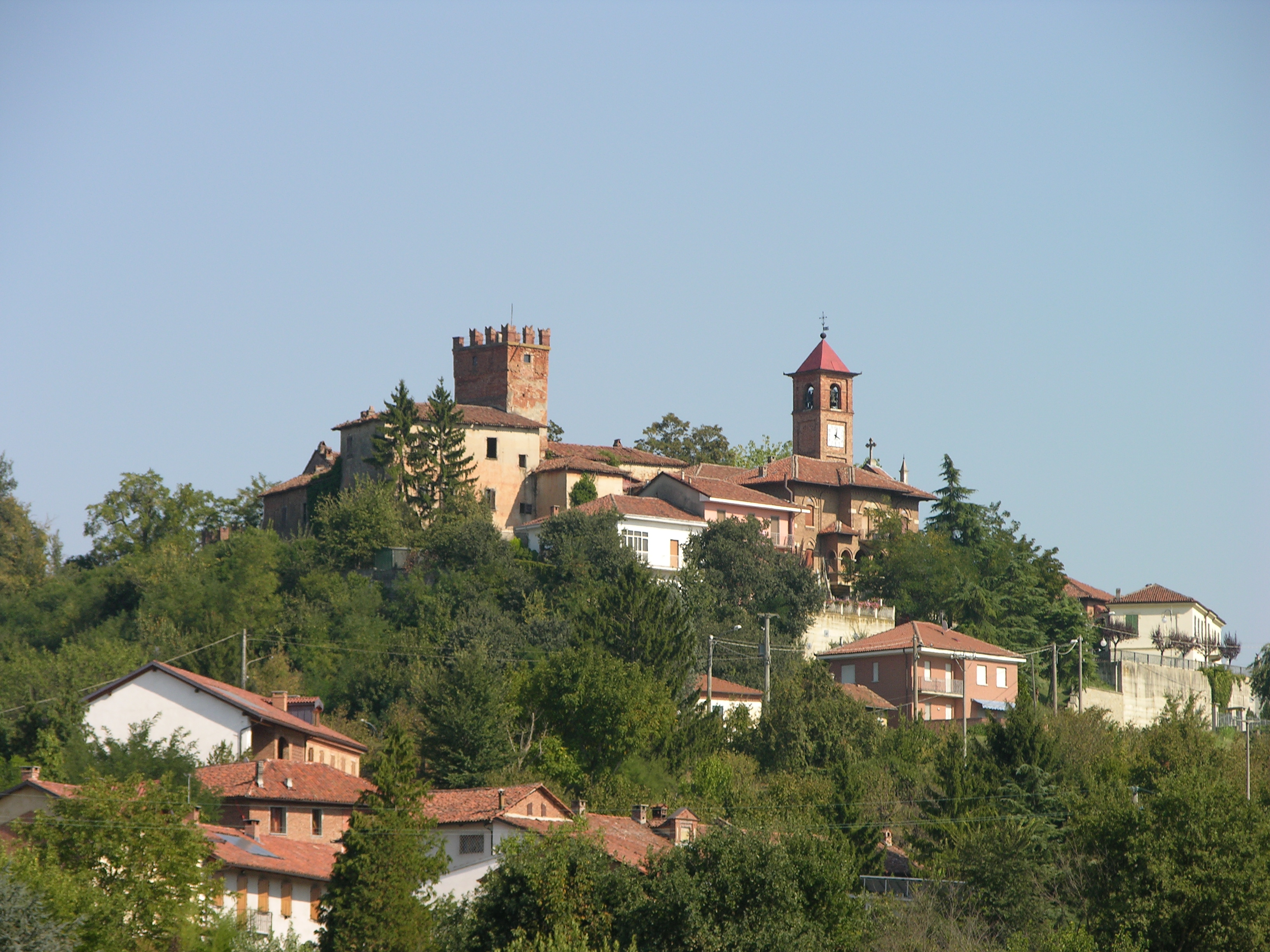
- View of Castellero

- Coat of arms

- Location within Italy Location within Piedmont
- Coordinates: 44°56′N 8°4′E
- Country: Italy
- Region: Piedmont
- Province: Province of Asti (AT)

Government
  - Mayor: Roberto Campia

Area
  - Total: 4.3 km^{2} (1.7 sq mi)

Population (jan. 2024)
  - Total: 289
  - Density: 67/km^{2} (170/sq mi)
- Time zone: UTC+1 (CET)
  - Summer (DST): UTC+2 (CEST)
- Postal code: 14011
- Dialing code: 0141

Castellero is a comune (municipality) in the Province of Asti in the Italian region Piedmont, located about 30 kilometres (19 mi) southeast of Turin and about 11 kilometres (7 mi) northwest of Asti. As of 31 january 2024, it had a population of 289 and an area of 4.3 square kilometres (1.7 mi^{2}).

Castellero borders the following municipalities: Baldichieri d'Asti, Monale, and Villafranca d'Asti.

== Demographic evolution ==
Historical population

Year	Pop.	±%
1861	371	—
1871	398	+7.3%
1881	401	+0.8%
1901	458	+14.2%
1911	496	+8.3%

Year	Pop.	±%
1921	485	−2.2%
1931	430	−11.3%
1936	380	−11.6%
1951	299	−21.3%
1961	268	−10.4%

Year	Pop.	±%
1971	265	−1.1%
1981	243	−8.3%
1991	281	+15.6%
2001	291	+3.6%

Source: Data from ISTAT
