= Casane Astigiane =

Italian banking family

The Casane Astigiane (Italian for "Houses of Asti") were the major family banking houses of Asti, Italy in the Middle Ages. Their economic activities included currency exchange and lending.

== Guelf families ==
- Solaro. Without a doubt the most influential Guelf house.
- Falletti
- Troja
- Malabaila

== Ghibelline families ==
- Guttuari, most powerful Ghibelline family, often aligned with the rulers of Montferrat. With the Turco and the Isnardi families, they created the powerful De Castello consortium.
- Isnardi
- Turco or Turci
- Scarampi
- Alfieri
- Buneo

== Non-aligned Families ==
- Roero
- Pelletta
- Asinari

== Bibliography ==
- AA.VV, Il Platano, rivista per lo studio della cultura ed attività astigiana raccolte dal 1977 al 2005
- Aldo di Ricaldone Annali del Monferrato Vol I and II, distributed by Lorenzo Fornaca, publisher Asti
- Aldo di Ricaldone "Monferrato tra Po e Tanaro Vol.1/2 Gribaudo Lorenzo Fornaca editore sedico Asti 1999
- Bianco A. Asti Medievale . Ed CRA 1960
  - Asti ai tempi della rivoluzione e dell'impero. Ed CRA 1960
- Bera G. Asti edifici e palazzi nel medioevo. Gribaudo Lorenzo Fornaca Editore Se Di Co Asti 2004
- Bobba Vergano Antiche zecche della provincia di Asti. Bobba ed. 1971
- Bordone R., Dalla carità al credito. C.R.A. 2005
- Fissore, Le miniature del codex astensis C.R.A. 2002
  - De Canis G.S. Proposta per una lettura della corografia astigiana, C.R.A 1977
- Gabiani Niccola, Asti nei principali suoi ricordi storici vol 1, 2,3. Tip.Vinassa 1927-1934
  - Le torri le case-forti ed i palazzi nobili medievali in Asti, A.Forni ed. 1978
- Grassi S., Storia della Città di Asti vol I, II. Atesa ed. 1987
- S.G. Incisa, Asti nelle sue chiese ed iscrizioni C. R.A. 1974
- A.M. Patrone, Le Casane astigiane in Savoia, Dep. subalpina di storia patria, Torino 1959.
- Peyrot A. Asti e l'Astigiano, tip.Torinese Ed. 1983
- Ruggiero M. Briganti del Piemonte Napoleonico, Le Bouquiniste 1968
- Scapino M. La cattedrale di Asti e il suo antico borgo, C.R.A.
- Taricco S. Piccola storia dell'arte astigiana .Quaderno del Platano Ed. Il Platano 1994
- Testa d. Storia del Monferrato terza edizione ampliata Gribaudo-Lorenzo Fornaca editore Asti 1996
- V.Malfatto Asti antiche e nobili casate. Il Portichetto 1982
- Vergano L., Storia di Asti Vol. 1,2,3 Tip.S.Giuseppe Asti1953, 1957
  - Vicende storiche di Refrancore, L'autore 1996

== See also ==
- Asti
- Towers and palaces of the Roero
