= Triversa =

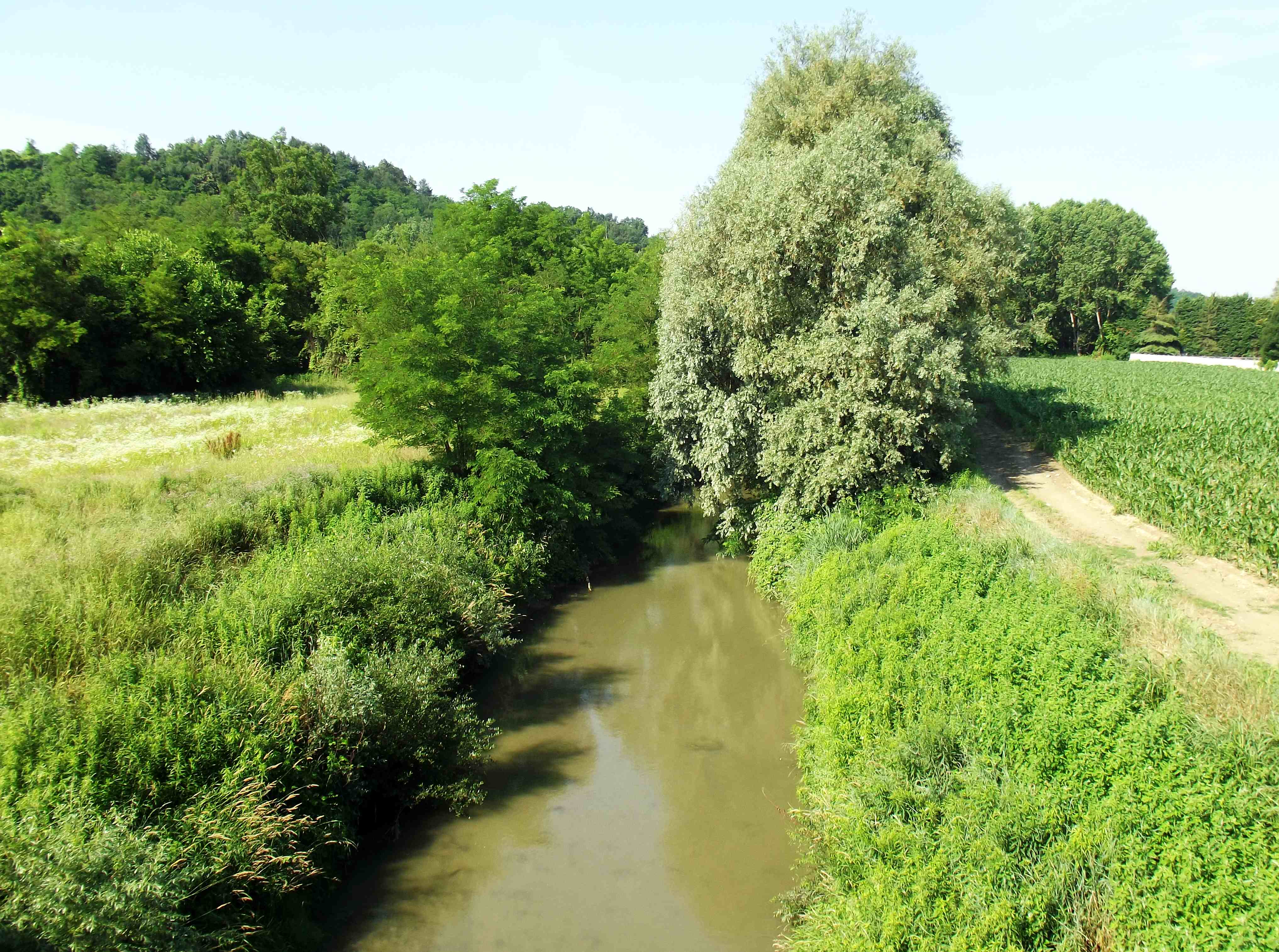
- The Triversa near Baldichieri d'Asti.

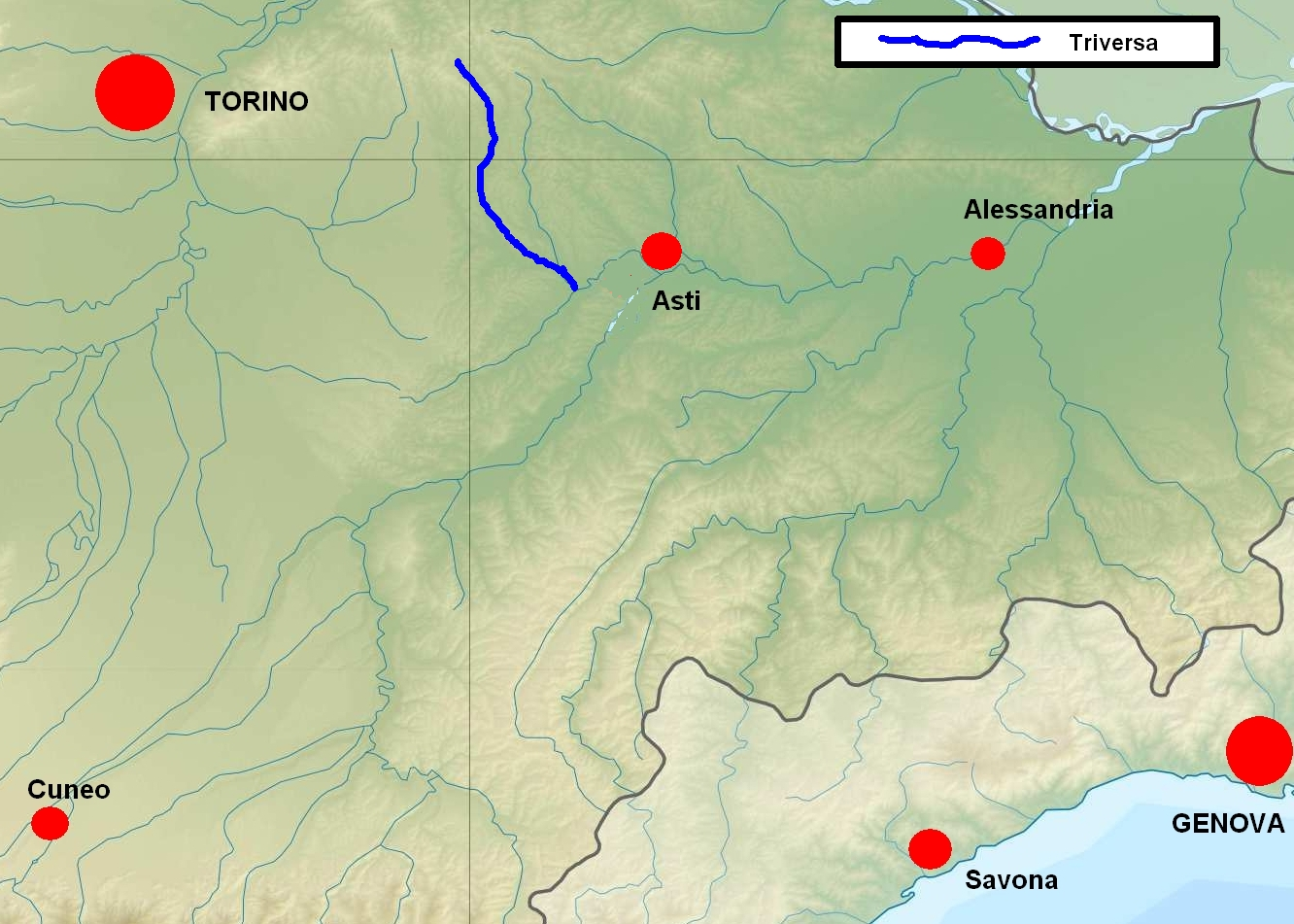
- Location within southern Piedmont

Location
- Country: Italy

Physical characteristics
- Source
  - location: Bric Ausano, near Cocconato
  - elevation: 450 m (1,480 ft)
- Mouth: Borbore
  - coordinates: 44.8717°N 8.1199°E
- Length: 25.8 km (16.0 mi)
- Basin size: 284.37 square kilometres (109.80 mi^{2})
- Discharge
  - average: (mouth) 5.2 m^{3}/s (180 cu ft/s)

Basin features
- Progression: Borbore→ Tanaro→ Po→ Adriatic Sea

The Triversa is a river of Piedmont, Italy. It is a left-side tributary of the Borbore.

== Geography ==
The Triversa rises from the Bric Ausano between Tonengo and Aramengo (province of Asti). Flowing southwards through the hills of Monferrato it gets the waters of its two main tributaries, the Traversola from the right side and the rio di Monale from the left. The Triversa joins the Borbore near Baldichieri d'Asti at 136 metres (446 ft) above sea level.

== Other projects ==
- Media related to Triversa at Wikimedia Commons
