= Palazzo Gazelli =

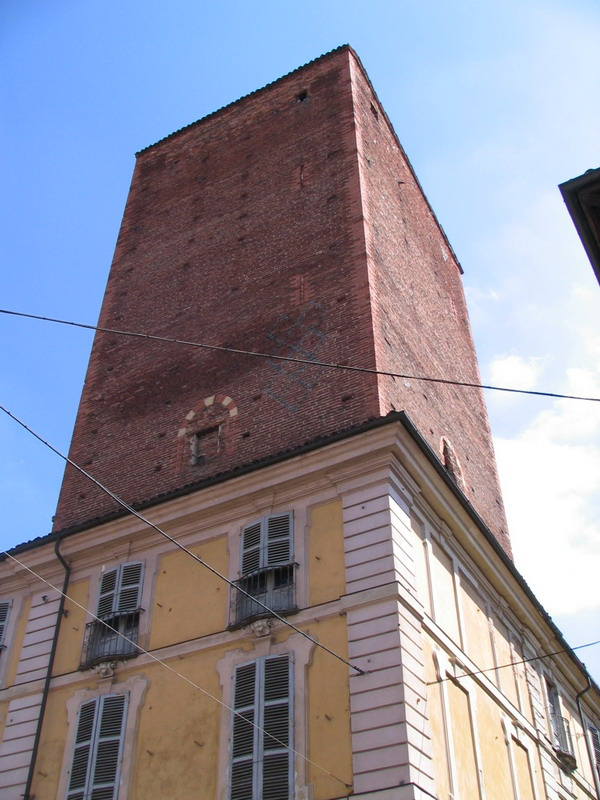

General information
- Type: Palace
- Town or city: Asti
- Country: Italy
- Coordinates: 44.897944°N 8.20125°E

Website
- www.palazzogazelli.it

Palazzo Gazelli is a medieval palace located in the city of Asti, Italy.

The palace includes an imposing tower, which is 24 m (79 ft) high and square in plan with 8.1 m (27 ft) metre sides. It was probably built in the 13th century and presents a few openings: the main door with an ogival arch, and three windows.

== History ==
The palace was created by combining several adjacent buildings and the original owner is unknown.

In 1726 the owning family Cotti di Ceres e Scurzolengo renovated the palace in Baroque style. The work was carried out by architect Benedetto Alfieri.

In 1840 the palace passed to the Gazelli di Rossana family, after which it is now named.
