= Solaro (family) =

Italian banking family

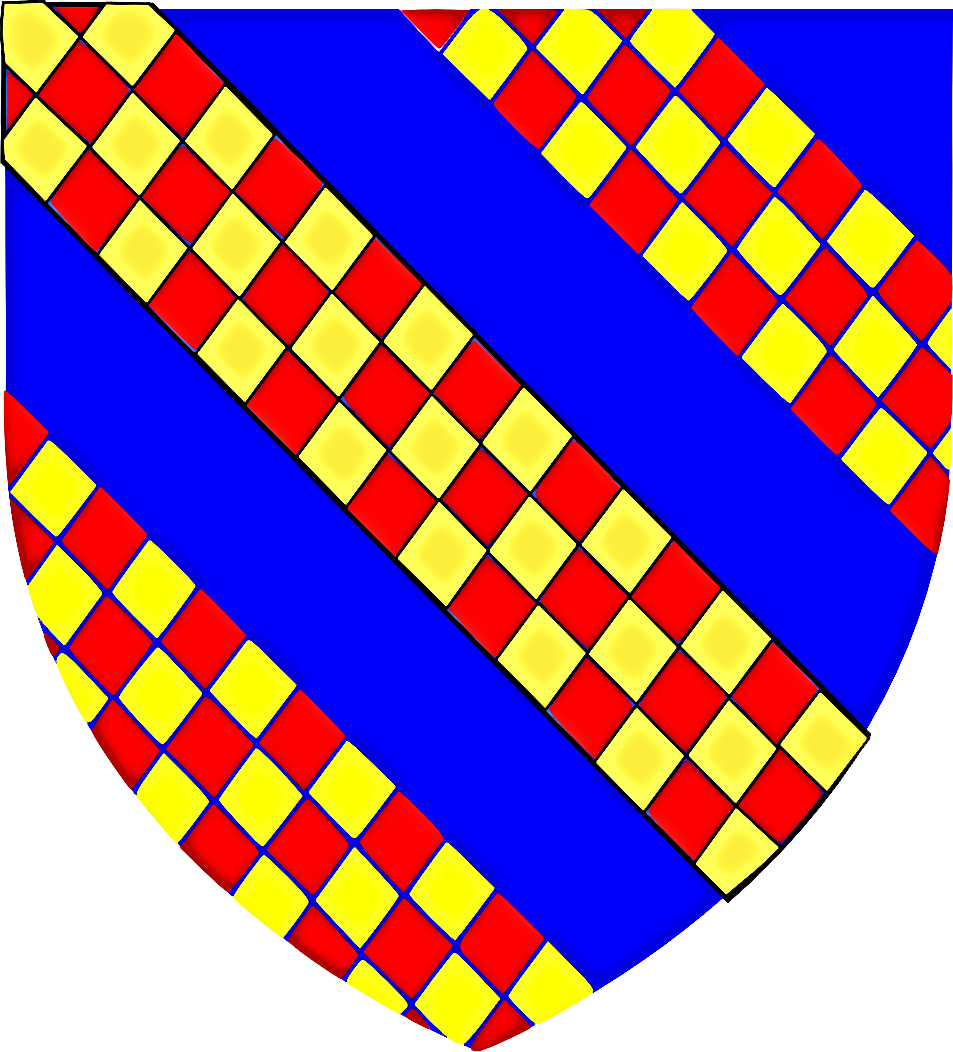
Coat of arms of the Solaro family

The Solaro family was the most powerful medieval banking family in Asti, Italy. At the height of their power, they were owners of 24 castles within Asti's communal territory. They were also present in Genoa in the 12th century and acquired holdings in Sestri Levante. Of the Casane Astigiane, they were the main Guelph supporters in Asti, in contrast to the 'De Castello" union.

Initially their commercial activity was centred primarily in the fairs of Provins, Troyes, in northern France and Flanders. By the 13th century, they were active in Bourgogne and Franche-Comté.

In 1276, their intervention was critical in the peace between Asti and Charles of Anjou and the family flourished under the Angevin period.

== See also ==
- Asti
- Casane Astigiane
