= Baldichieri d'Asti =

Baldichieri d'Asti Baudiché
- Comune
- Comune di Baldichieri d'Asti
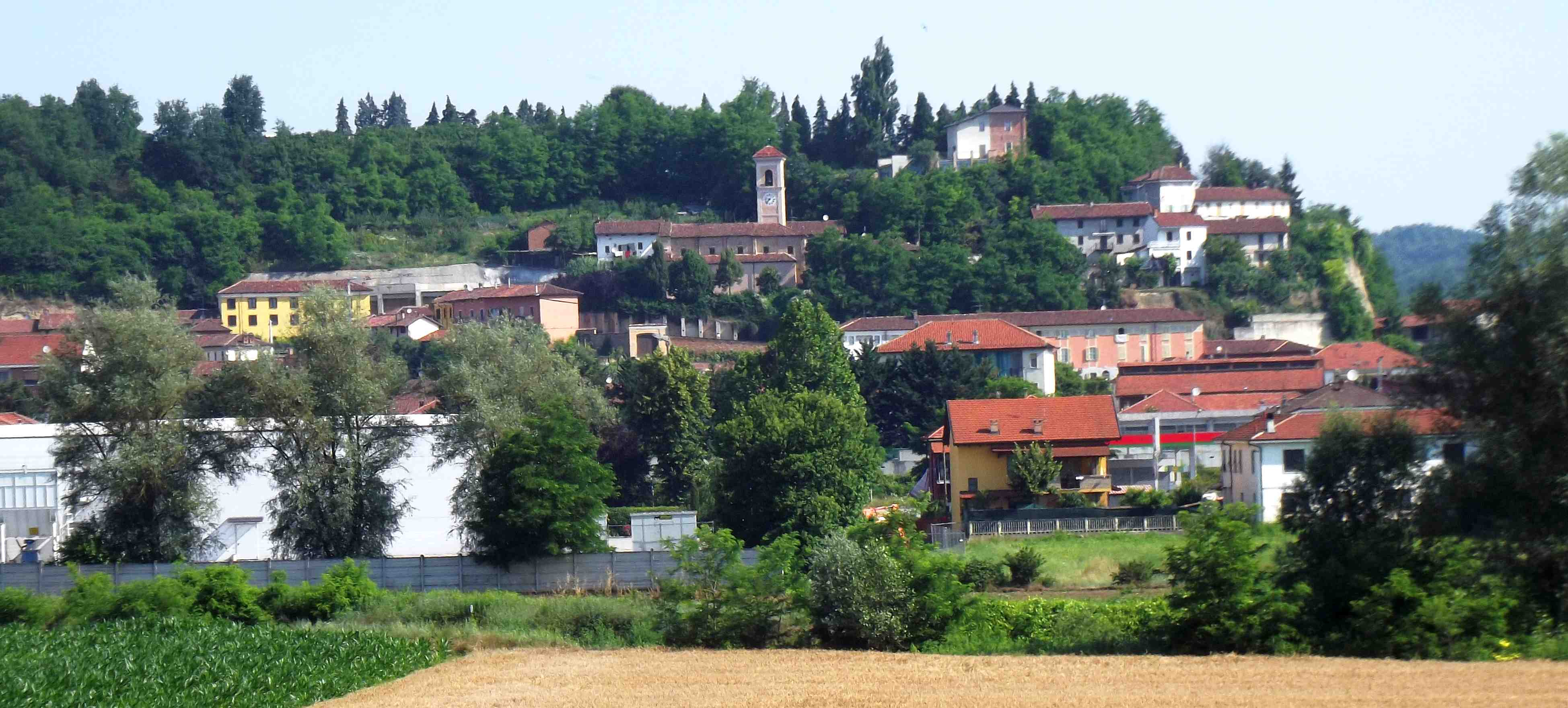
- View of Baldichieri d'Asti

- Coat of arms

- Location within Italy Location within Piedmont
- Coordinates: 44°54′N 8°5′E
- Country: Italy
- Region: Piedmont
- Province: Province of Asti (AT)

Area
  - Total: 5.2 km^{2} (2.0 sq mi)
- Elevation: 173 m (568 ft)

Population (Dec. 2004)
  - Total: 1,000
  - Density: 190/km^{2} (500/sq mi)
- Demonym: Baldichieresi
- Time zone: UTC+1 (CET)
  - Summer (DST): UTC+2 (CEST)
- Postal code: 14011
- Dialing code: 0141
- Website: Official website

Baldichieri d'Asti is a comune (municipality) in the Province of Asti in the Italian region Piedmont, located about 35 kilometres (22 mi) southeast of Turin and about 9 kilometres (6 mi) west of Asti. As of 31 December 2004, it had a population of 1,000 and an area of 5.2 square kilometres (2.0 mi^{2}).

Baldichieri d'Asti borders the following municipalities: Asti, Castellero, Monale, Tigliole, and Villafranca d'Asti.

== Demographic evolution ==
Historical population

| Year | Pop. | ±% |
|---|---|---|
| 1861 | 928 | — |
| 1871 | 866 | −6.7% |
| 1881 | 786 | −9.2% |
| 1901 | 918 | +16.8% |
| 1911 | 944 | +2.8% |

| Year | Pop. | ±% |
|---|---|---|
| 1921 | 887 | −6.0% |
| 1931 | 861 | −2.9% |
| 1936 | 820 | −4.8% |
| 1951 | 776 | −5.4% |
| 1961 | 835 | +7.6% |

| Year | Pop. | ±% |
|---|---|---|
| 1971 | 1,018 | +21.9% |
| 1981 | 1,029 | +1.1% |
| 1991 | 995 | −3.3% |
| 2001 | 1,009 | +1.4% |

Source: Data from ISTAT
