= Borbore =

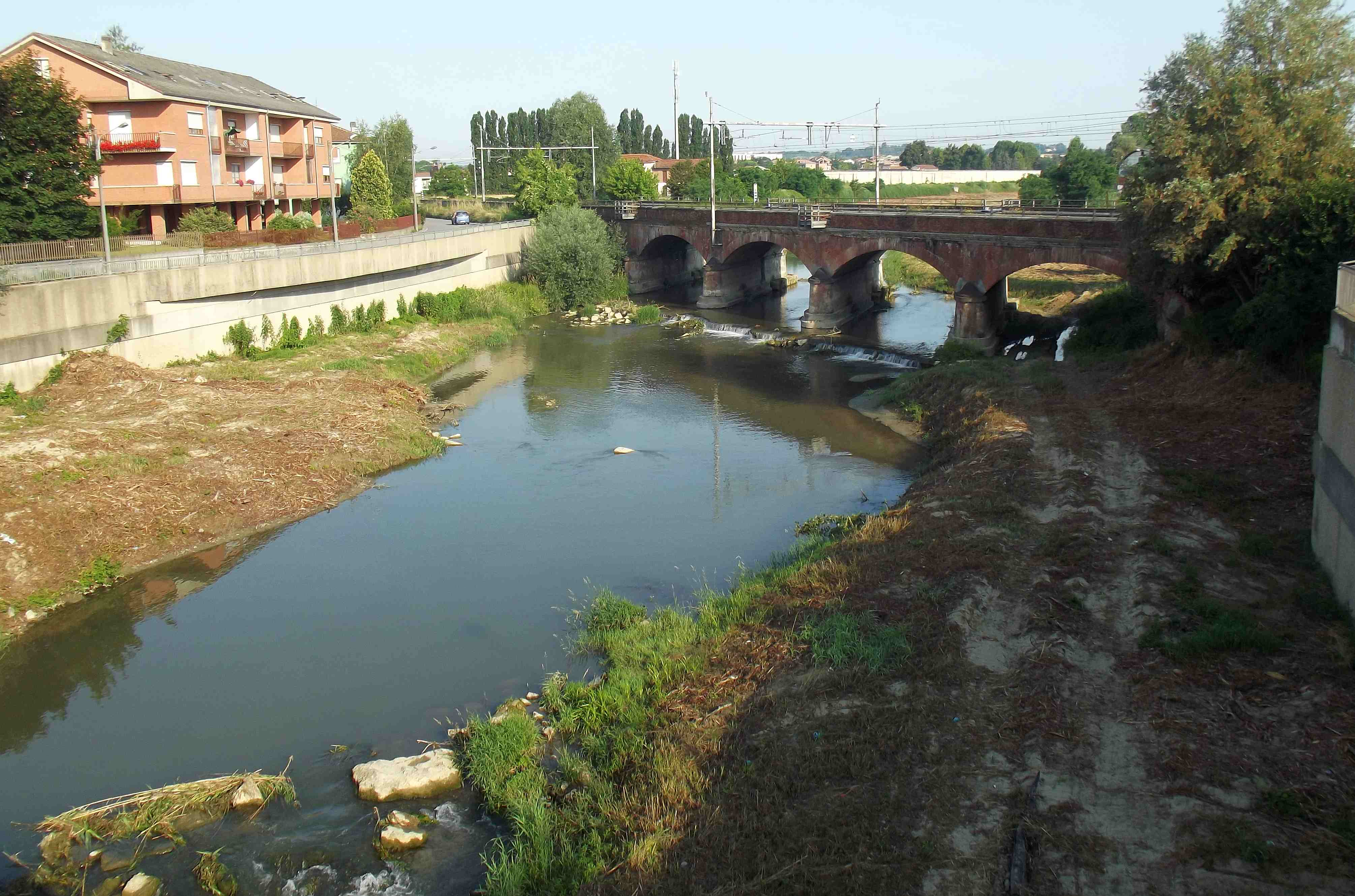
- The Borbore in Asti

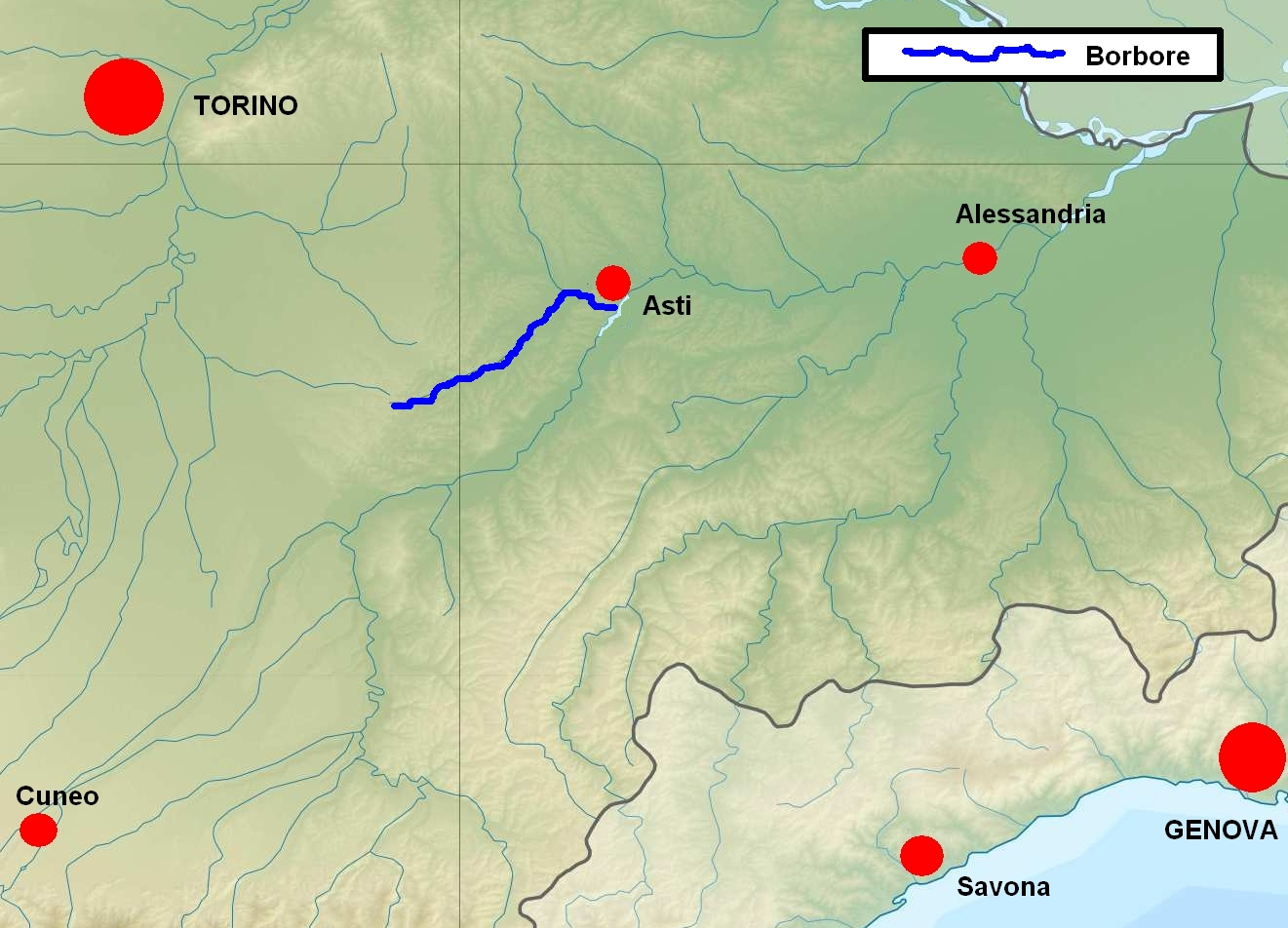
- Location within southern Piedmont

Location
- Country: Italy

Physical characteristics
- Source
  - location: sorgente del Borbore, near Guarene 8Roero)
  - elevation: 297 m (974 ft)
- Mouth: Tanaro
  - coordinates: 44.8853°N 8.2107°E
- Length: 45.3 km (28.1 mi)
- Basin size: 506 km^{2} (195 mi^{2})
- Discharge
  - average: (mouth) 9.28 m^{3}/s (328 cu ft/s)

Basin features
- Progression: Tanaro→ Po→ Adriatic Sea
- Tributaries
  - left: Triversa

The Borbore is a river of Piedmont, Italy. It is a left-side tributary of the Tanaro.

== Geography ==
The Borbore rises in the hills of Roero near Guarene (province of Cuneo). Flowing towards the north-east it enters the Province of Asti and gets from the left side the waters of its main tributary, the Triversa. The Borbore joins the Tanaro in Asti.

== Other projects ==
Media related to Borbore at Wikimedia Commons
