= Stura del Monferrato =

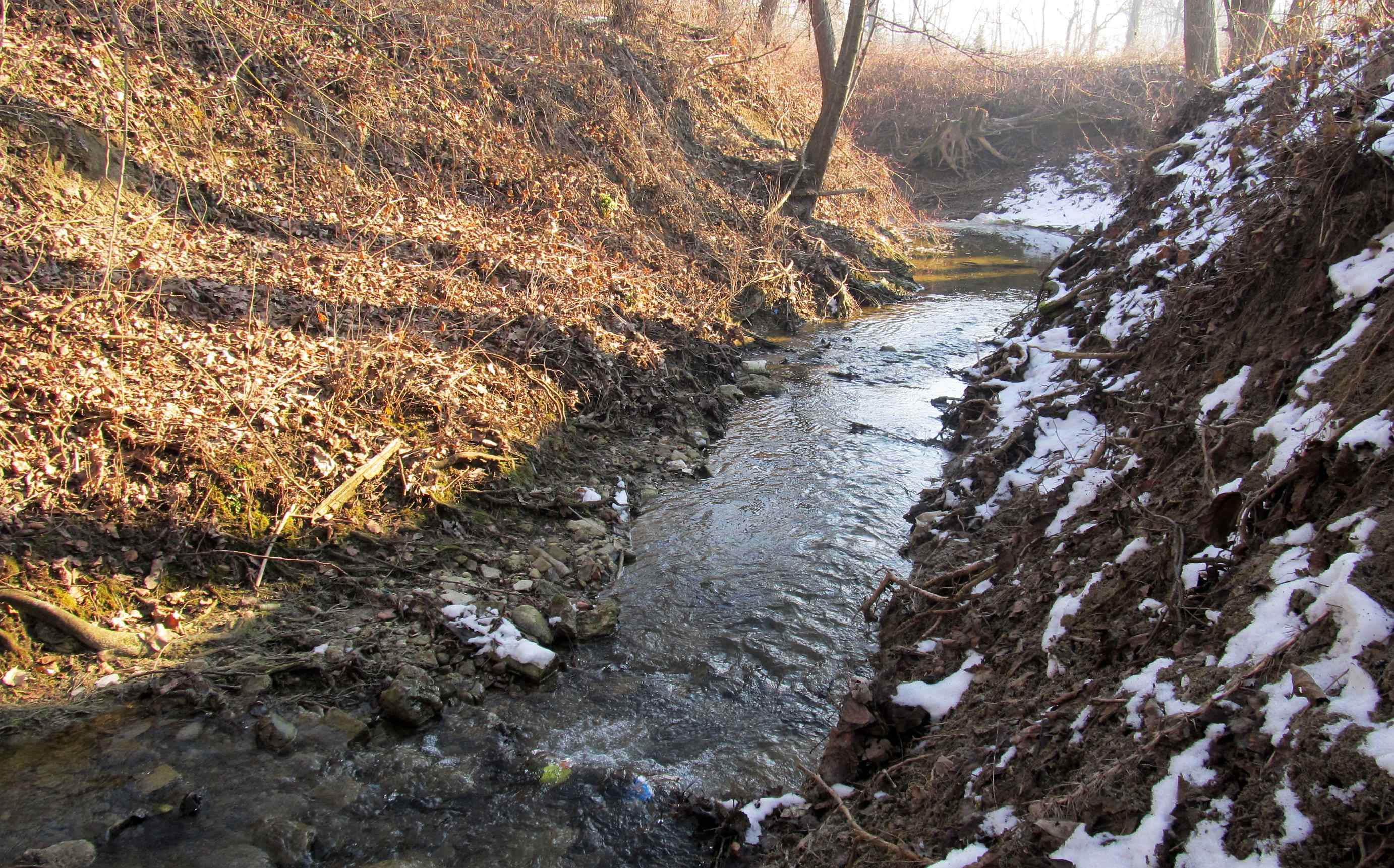
- The stream between Robella and Montiglio, at the beginning of its course

Location
- Country: Italy

Physical characteristics
- Source
  - location: near Moransengo (Province of Asti)
  - elevation: 400 m (1,300 ft)
- Mouth
  - location: Po near Pontestura (Province of Alessandria)
  - coordinates: 45°08′55″N 8°20′51″E
- Length: 36.7 km (22.8 mi)
- Discharge
  - average: 3.2 m^{3}/s (110 cu ft/s)

Basin features
- Progression: Po→ Adriatic Sea

The Stura del Monferrato (also known as the Stura piccola and the Stura di Casale, in each case to distinguish it from other Piedmontese watercourses of the same name: the Stura di Lanzo, the Stura di Demonte and the Stura di Ovada) is a 36.7-kilometre (22.8 mi) stream, which runs through Murisengo, Cerrina Monferrato, Mombello Monferrato and Pontestura in the Italian Province of Alessandria.

A right tributary of the Po River it flows in a northeasterly direction within the hilly region of the Basso Monferrato, through the Val Cerrina. (This valley, however, was not formed by the Stura: rather it was excavated by the major watercourse of Piedmont which existed during the Lower Pleistocene, draining the western Alps and following an east-south-easterly course generally to the south of today's Po.)

Its mean discharge of a mere 3.2 cubic metres per second (110 cu ft/s) relies immediately upon precipitation, and is subject to marked seasonal variations.

== Notes ==
This article, as of 3 December 2009, was a free translation of its counterpart in the Italian Wikipedia: specifically this version.
