= Turco (family) =

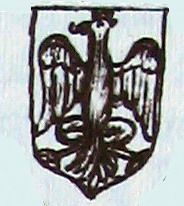
The Turco family crest

The Turco, Turchi, Turci or sometimes Turco dei De Castello family's rise to prominence originated in 12th-century Asti, Italy, and later the surrounding comunes of Frinco, Mombercelli, Montemagno, Tonco, Viale, and in part Barbaresco, Neive, Revigliasco d'Asti and Savigliano. They are considered one of the "Casane Astigiane", the major familial banking "houses" that powered the economy of medioeval Asti.

Their accession to noble status can be traced to their increased wealth through banking, lending and property investment, starting in the 11th and 12th centuries. They were renowned as Ghibelline supporters throughout the Middle Ages. Their economic prestige dropped at the end of the 16th century and the family eventually fell from nobility.

== Origins ==
The noted historian Napione relates the family to the birth of the Order of the Holy Sepulchre, affirming that Gherardo Turco, signore of Tonco, was among the founders of the order in 1084. In 1189 Riccardo Turco became the successor to the first English Prior of the Knights Hospitaller.

United in hospitium as the Ghibelline consortium "De Castello" with the influential ghibelline Isnardi, Turco, and Guttuari families, they became one of Asti's major patrician families.

By the early 12th century, Turco family members became lords (signori) of Serralunga, Malamorte, Neive, Barbaresco, Monfalcone, Sarmatorio and Manzano. By the end of the 12th century, they also became lords of Tonco and Frinco.

The family's first renowned individual was Giovanni Turco, who in 1278 appears as the lieutenant (luogotenente) to the podestà Mellano Solaro. Of note was also Guglielmo Turco, who in 1300 reportedly murdered Emanuele Solaro, to vindicate the Guelph government, starting a new phase of the civil war. Once peace was restored in 1309, Guglielmo was sent off in exile.

The first member of notable economic activity was Palmerone Turco, who established banks in Savoy (Thonon and Sembrancher) between 1335 and 1363.

Giovanni Turco, son of Antonio, became the General Capitain of the March of Montferrat, but he was accused of cowardliness and was hanged in Moncalvo in 1430.

Della Chiesa writes that in the 17th century, "the family fell in disgrace and was forced to relinquish its properties, maintaining however its titles of nobility. A count Turco is cited in 1906, as "the possessor of an ancient feudal mill once owned by the family".

== Family crest ==
Composed of a silver shield with a black eagle, with a golden crown. The motto reads "la virtù può accompagnarsi alla buona fortuna" (Virtue will bring good fortune).

== Economic and feudal activities ==
The Turco's economic rise began locally in the early 12th century where through financial gains they increased their land holdings and expanded serfdom. By 1270 they began to operate at an international level, receiving privileges in Hainaut (in particular the towns of Valenciennes, Binche and Maubeuge), and in Savoy, and by lending to the Counts of Hainaut and Namur.

In 1342 Antonio and Turchetto Turco took over Frinco from the Pelletta family, as well as the castle in Montemagno from the comune of Asti. In 1375 Antonio Turco expanded his feudal holdings. Oliviero Turco was given lordship of Revigliasco from the marquis of Monferrato in 1367, however he was forced to abdicate when it was restored to Asti.

A branch of the family established itself in Hainaut, where Albert Turco de Castello was lord of Saint Martin, knight, councillor of William I, Count of Hainaut (House of Avesnes) in 1336. Later he was in the service of Wenceslaus, Duke of Luxembourg 1357. His brother Rolando Turco de Castello acquired the lordship of Iwuy in 1337.

As Asti's control by the Angevin Kingdom of Naples began to be challenged by the Visconti of Milan in the 14th century, a branch of the family established itself in Naples under the auspices of Queen Joan I, with some venturing to take positions in Calabria. In 1431 Pietrino Turco was given rights to Quattordio by Filippo Maria Visconti.

By the end of the 16th century the dynasty of the Turco family began to lose economic prestige and, eventually, they fell from nobility.

== Turco in Verona ==
It is not clear if the Turco family of Verona is connected with the family of Asti. Nonetheless, in 1393 the Turco family was invested with the title in Visegna (Salizzole) and, a few years later, the church of S. Caterina di Alessandria was constructed.

There were four families which in the seicento that owned property in Bionde di Visegna and were titled as having jurisdiction.

== See also ==
- Asti
- Casane Astigiane
