= Frinco Castle =

Castle in Piedmont, Italy

- Castello di Frinco
- Frinco, Piedmont, Italy
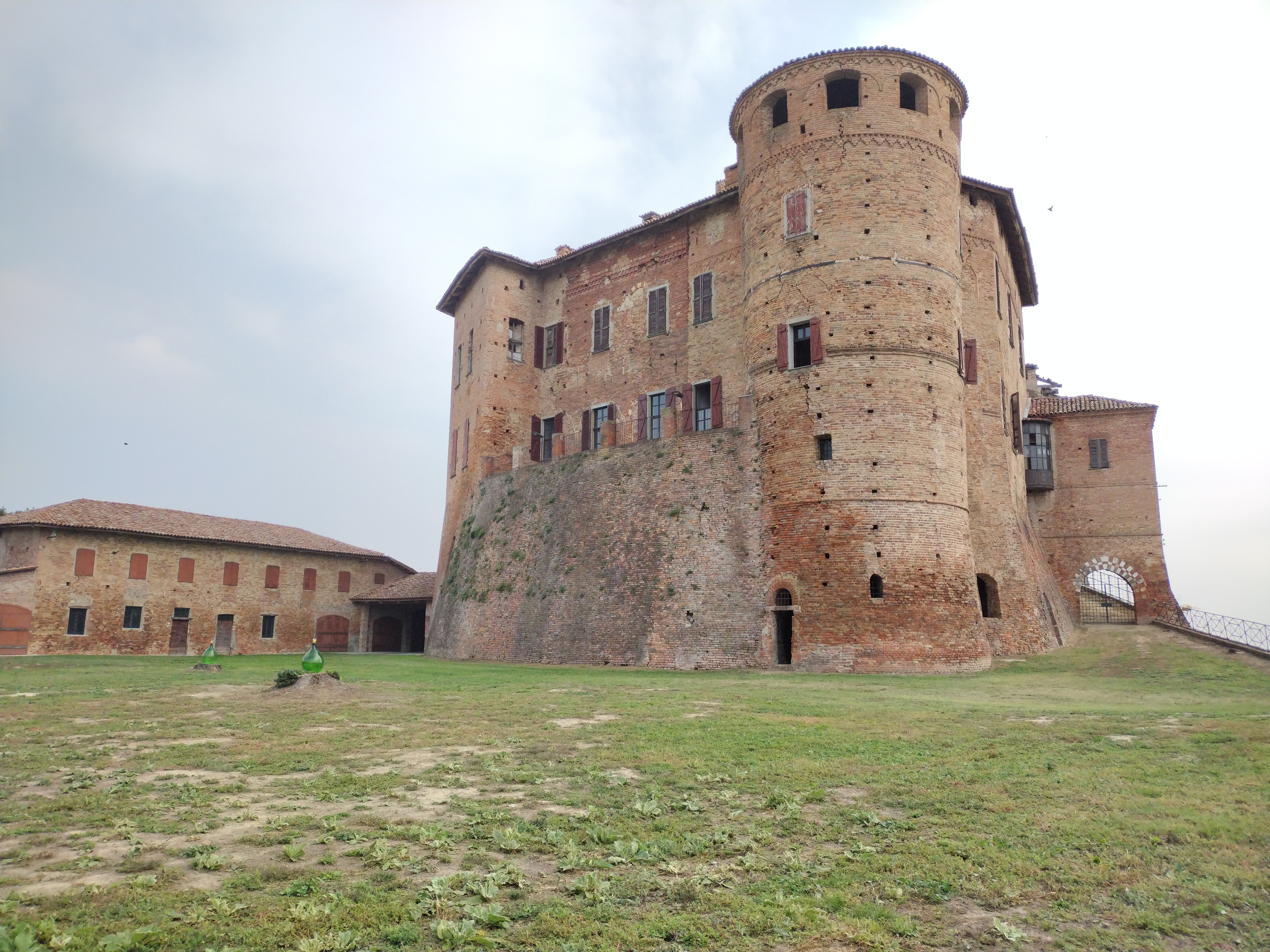
- Frinco Castle in 2022

Site information
- Type: Castle

Location
- Coordinates: 45°00′19.38″N 8°10′15.74″E

Frinco Castle (Italian: Castello di Frinco) is a castle located in Frinco, Piedmont, Italy.

== History ==
The earliest documents attesting to the castle's existence date back to 1288, while the settlement of Frinco itself appears in historical records as early as 1117.

From around 1250, Frinco became part of the holdings of the Pelletta banking family of Asti, who transferred it in the early 14th century to another banking family, the Turco, who retained possession until 1342. In 1355, Emperor Charles IV granted the castle, previously caught up in the conflict between Guelphs and Ghibellines, to John II, Marquis of Montferrat. In 1438, Albert II of Germany declared Frinco an imperial fief. From 1442 onward, the castle passed to the noble Mazzetti family, first as counts and later, from 1733, as marquises. In 1630, they resisted French troops, who ultimately managed to capture the castle by using mines. The Mazzetti long exercised the right to mint coinage. In 1829, following the extinction of the Mazzetti family, the castle passed to the Incisa di Camerana family.

In 1893, the castle came into the possession of the Josephite Fathers, who used it as a secondary school. Between 1915 and 1918, the property was requisitioned and became a large prisoner-of-war camp for soldiers of the Austria-Hungary captured during the First World War; a commemorative plaque marking this period was unveiled in 2016 by a delegation from the Austrian Black Cross.

In 2019, the castle was purchased by the municipality of Frinco, which began restoration work in 2020.
