= Villadeati =

- Comune
- Comune di Villadeati
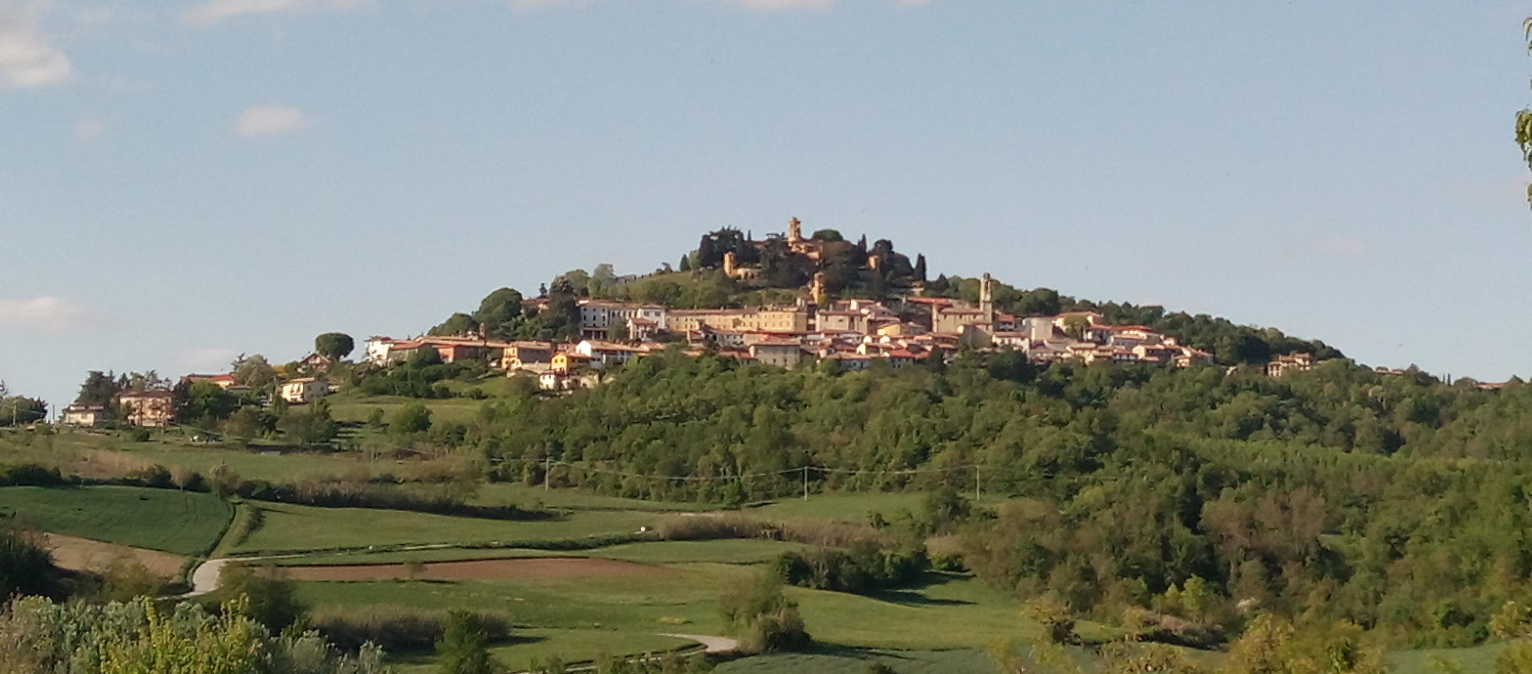

- Location within Italy Location within Piedmont
- Coordinates: 45°4′N 8°10′E
- Country: Italy
- Region: Piedmont
- Province: Alessandria (AL)
- Frazioni: Fontanina, Lussello, Pavo, Trittango, Vadarengo, Zanco

Government
  - Mayor: Francesco Azzalin

Area
  - Total: 14.5 km^{2} (5.6 sq mi)
- Elevation: 410 m (1,350 ft)

Population (31 July 2014)
  - Total: 496
  - Density: 34.2/km^{2} (88.6/sq mi)
- Demonym: Villadeatesi
- Time zone: UTC+1 (CET)
  - Summer (DST): UTC+2 (CEST)
- Postal code: 15020
- Dialing code: 0141
- Website: Official website

Villadeati is a comune (municipality) in the Province of Alessandria in the Italian region Piedmont, located about 35 kilometres (22 mi) east of Turin and about 40 kilometres (25 mi) northwest of Alessandria.

Villadeati borders the following municipalities: Alfiano Natta, Murisengo, Odalengo Grande, Odalengo Piccolo, Montiglio Monferrato, and Tonco.

The village is home to Villadeati Castle.
