= Odalengo =

Odalengo is the name of two places in the Province of Alessandria, Piedmont, Italy:

- Odalengo Grande
- Odalengo Piccolo
