= Ponzano =

Ponzano may refer to:

Municipalities (comuni)

- Ponzano di Fermo, in the Province of Fermo, Marche, Italy
- Ponzano Monferrato, in the Province of Alessandria, Piedmont, Italy
- Ponzano Romano, in the Province of Rome, Lazio, Italy
- Ponzano Veneto, in the Province of Treviso, Veneto, Italy

Hamlets (frazioni)

- Ponzano (Civitella del Tronto), in the municipality of Civitella del Tronto (TE), Abruzzo, Italy
- Ponzano (Teramo), in the municipality of Teramo, Abruzzo, Italy
- Ponzano Magra, in the municipality of Santo Stefano di Magra (SP), Liguria, Italy

Ships

- SS Ponzano, sunk by mine in 1939
