= Robella =

- Comune
- Comune di Robella
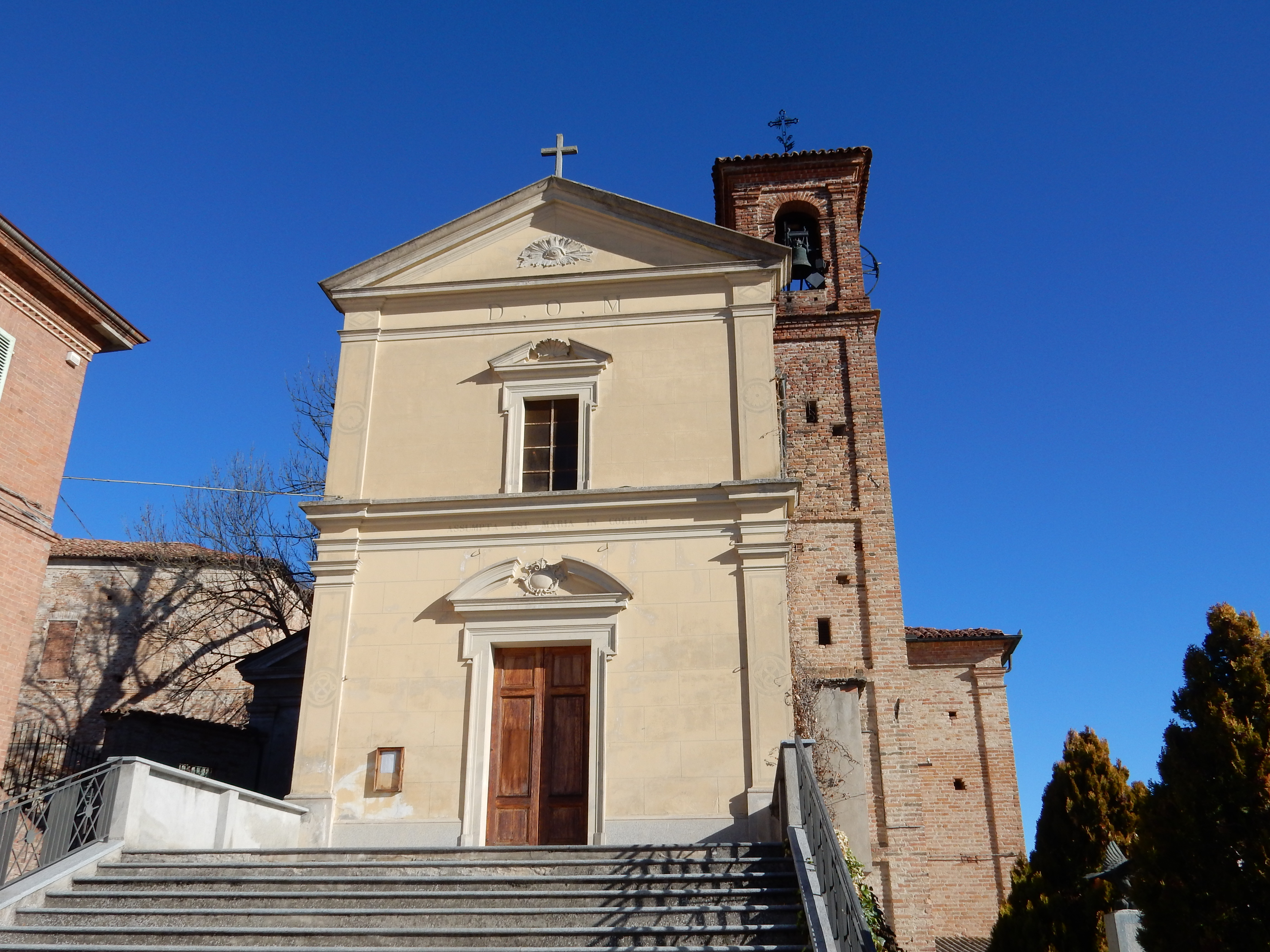
- Church in Robella

- Location within Italy Location within Piedmont
- Coordinates: 45°6′N 8°6′E
- Country: Italy
- Region: Piedmont
- Province: Province of Asti (AT)
- Frazioni: Cortiglione

Area
  - Total: 12.2 km^{2} (4.7 sq mi)
- Elevation: 428 m (1,404 ft)

Population (Dec. 2004)
  - Total: 545
  - Density: 44.7/km^{2} (116/sq mi)
- Demonym: Robellesi
- Time zone: UTC+1 (CET)
  - Summer (DST): UTC+2 (CEST)
- Postal code: 14020
- Dialing code: 0141

Robella is a comune (municipality) in the Province of Asti in the Italian region Piedmont, located about 30 kilometres (19 mi) east of Turin and about 25 kilometres (16 mi) northwest of Asti. As of 31 December 2004, it had a population of 545 and an area of 12.2 square kilometres (4.7 mi^{2}).

The municipality of Robella contains the frazione (subdivision) Cortiglione.

Robella borders the following municipalities: Brozolo, Cocconato, Montiglio Monferrato, Murisengo, Odalengo Grande, and Verrua Savoia.

== Demographic evolution ==
Historical population

Year	Pop.	±%
1861	1,566	—
1871	1,554	−0.8%
1881	1,439	−7.4%
1901	1,254	−12.9%
1911	1,340	+6.9%

Year	Pop.	±%
1921	1,366	+1.9%
1931	1,163	−14.9%
1936	1,115	−4.1%
1951	941	−15.6%
1961	816	−13.3%

Year	Pop.	±%
1971	695	−14.8%
1981	629	−9.5%
1991	560	−11.0%
2001	562	+0.4%

Source: Data from ISTAT
