= Villa San Secondo =

- Comune
- Comune di Villa San Secondo
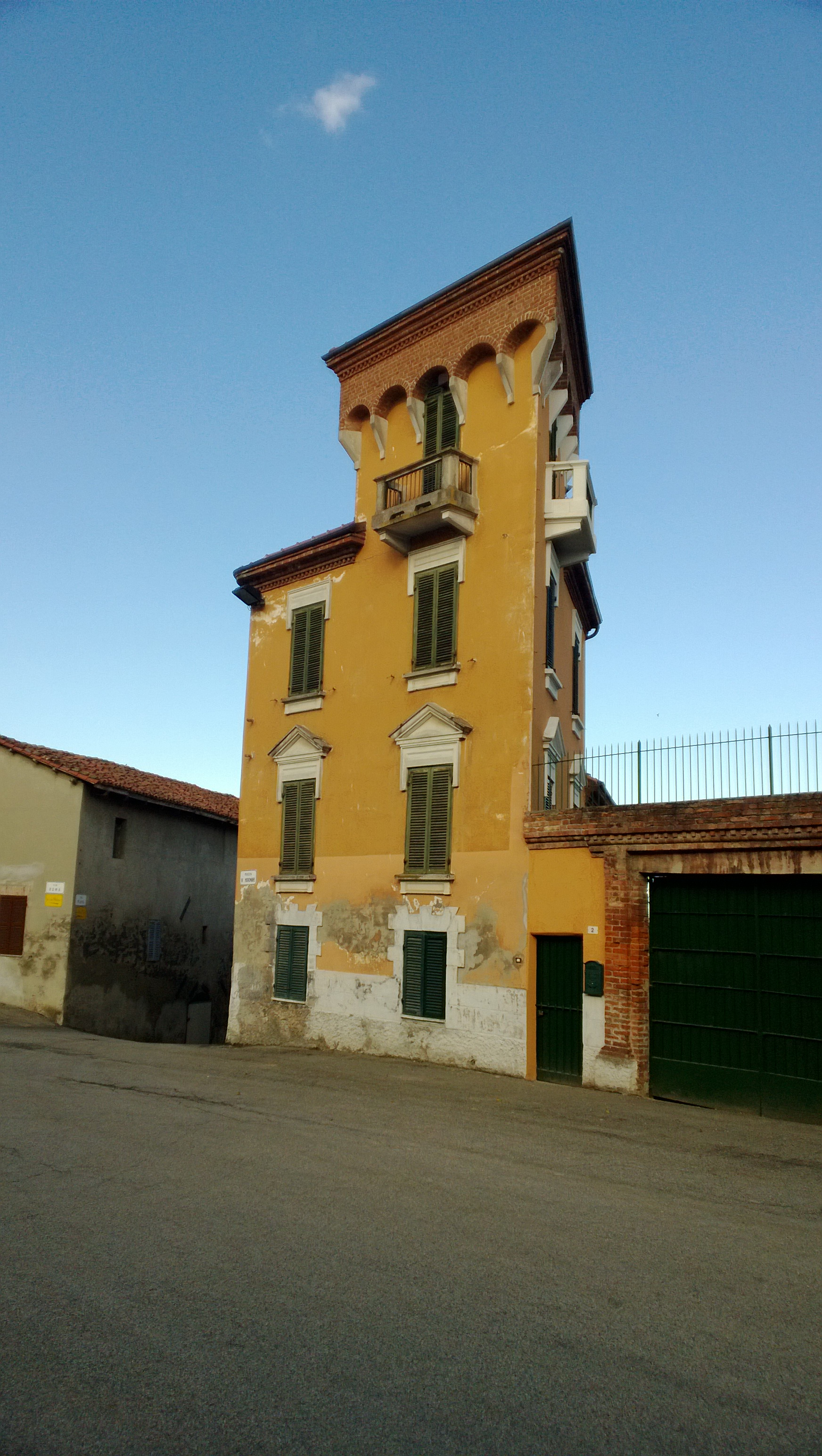

- Location within Italy Location within Piedmont
- Coordinates: 45°0′N 8°8′E
- Country: Italy
- Region: Piedmont
- Province: Asti (AT)

Government
  - Mayor: Roberto Mussano

Area
  - Total: 6.0 km^{2} (2.3 sq mi)
- Elevation: 287 m (942 ft)

Population (31 December 2014)
  - Total: 402
  - Density: 67/km^{2} (170/sq mi)
- Demonym: Villesi
- Time zone: UTC+1 (CET)
  - Summer (DST): UTC+2 (CEST)
- Postal code: 14020
- Dialing code: 0141
- Website: Official website

Villa San Secondo is a comune (municipality) in the Province of Asti in the Italian region Piedmont, located about 35 kilometres (22 mi) east of Turin and about 12 kilometres (7 mi) northwest of Asti.

Villa San Secondo borders the following municipalities: Castell'Alfero, Corsione, Cossombrato, Frinco, Montechiaro d'Asti, Montiglio Monferrato, and Tonco.
