= Castelletto Merli =

- Comune
- Comune di Castelletto Merli
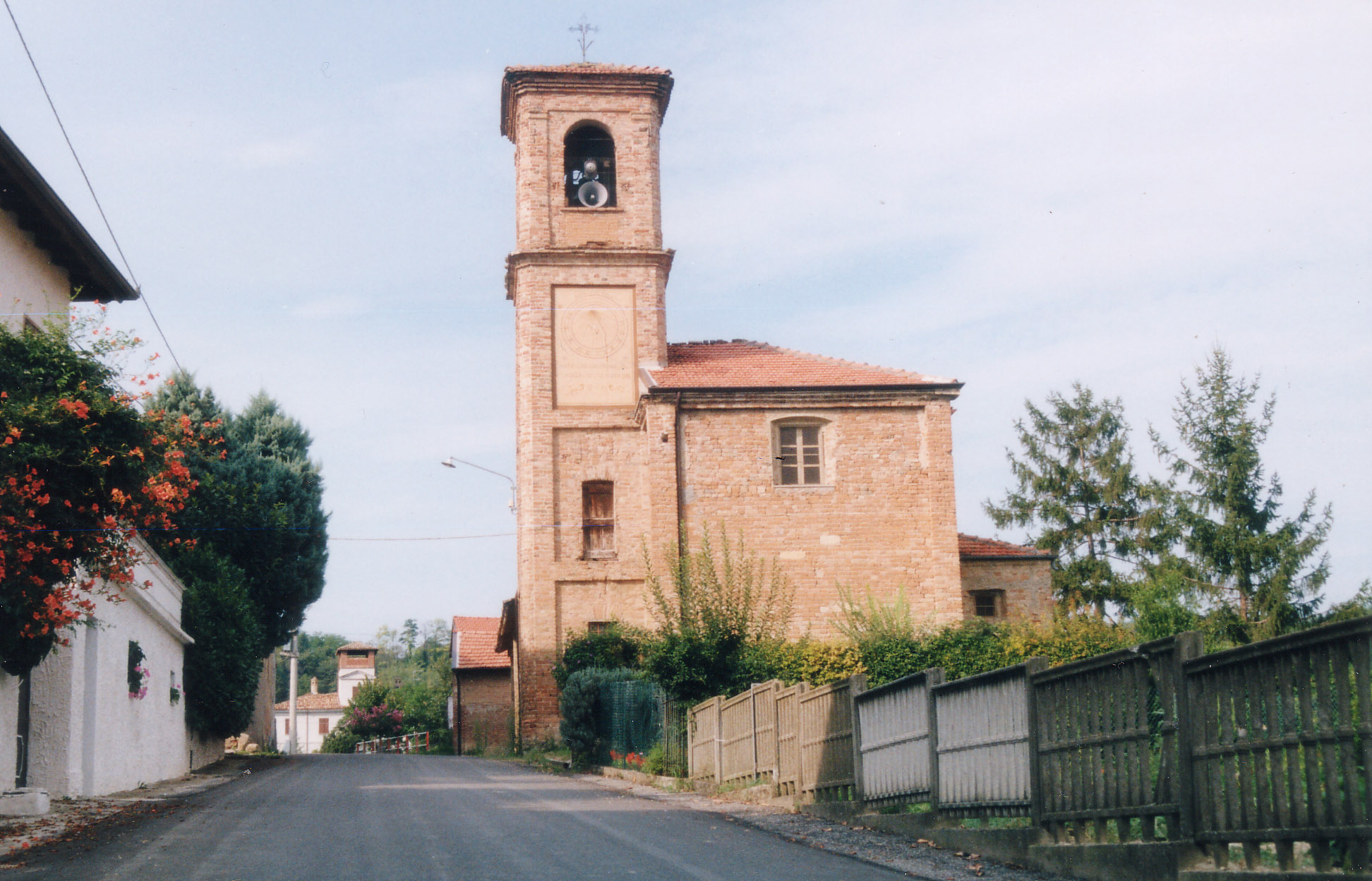

- Coat of arms

- Location within Italy Location within Piedmont
- Coordinates: 45°4′N 8°14′E
- Country: Italy
- Region: Piedmont
- Province: Alessandria (AL)
- Frazioni: Borgo San Giuseppe, Case Bertana, Cosso, Costamezzana, Godio, Guazzolo, Perno Inferiore, Perno Superiore, Sogliano, Terfengato, Terfengo, Valle

Government
  - Mayor: Ivan Cassone

Area
  - Total: 11.8 km^{2} (4.6 sq mi)
- Elevation: 268 m (879 ft)

Population (31 July 2014)
  - Total: 388
  - Density: 32.9/km^{2} (85.2/sq mi)
- Demonym: Castellettesi
- Time zone: UTC+1 (CET)
  - Summer (DST): UTC+2 (CEST)
- Postal code: 15020
- Dialing code: 0141
- Website: Official website

Castelletto Merli is a comune (municipality) in the Province of Alessandria in the Italian region Piedmont, located about 40 kilometres (25 mi) east of Turin and about 35 kilometres (22 mi) northwest of Alessandria.

Castelletto Merli borders the following municipalities: Alfiano Natta, Cerrina Monferrato, Mombello Monferrato, Moncalvo, Odalengo Piccolo, and Ponzano Monferrato.
