= Isnard =

Isnard can refer to:

- Achille-Nicolas Isnard (1748-1803), French economist
- Maximin Isnard (1755-1825), French revolutionary politician
- Jean-Esprit Isnard (1707–1781), French organ builder
- Jean-Baptiste Isnard (1726-1800), French organ builder (nephew of Jean-Esprit)
- Joseph Isnard (1740-1828), French organ builder (nephew of Jean-Esprit)
- Antoine-Tristan Danty d'Isnard (1663–1743), French botanist
- Clemente Isnard (1917–2011), Brazilian bishop
