= Villamiroglio =

- Comune
- Comune di Villamiroglio
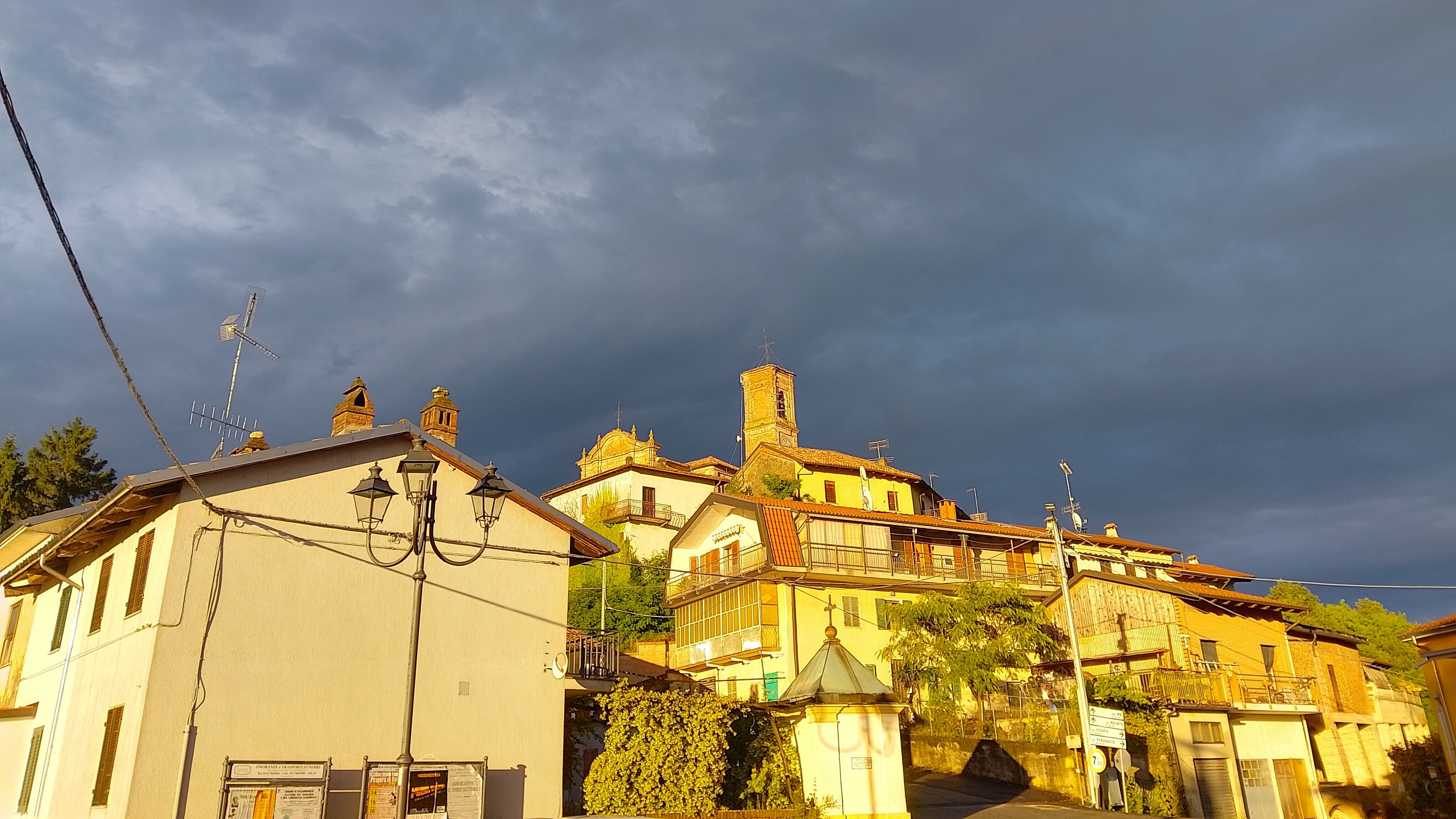

- Location within Italy Location within Piedmont
- Coordinates: 45°8′N 8°10′E
- Country: Italy
- Region: Piedmont
- Province: Province of Alessandria (AL)

Area
  - Total: 9.7 km^{2} (3.7 sq mi)

Population (Dec. 2004)
  - Total: 336
  - Density: 35/km^{2} (90/sq mi)
- Time zone: UTC+1 (CET)
  - Summer (DST): UTC+2 (CEST)
- Postal code: 15020
- Dialing code: 0142

Villamiroglio (Vilamireu in Piedmontese) is a comune (municipality) in the Province of Alessandria in the Italian region Piedmont, located about 35 kilometres (22 mi) east of Turin and about 45 kilometres (28 mi) northwest of Alessandria. As of 31 December 2004, it had a population of 336 and an area of 9.7 square kilometres (3.7 mi^{2}).

Villamiroglio borders the following municipalities: Cerrina Monferrato, Gabiano, Moncestino, Odalengo Grande, and Verrua Savoia.

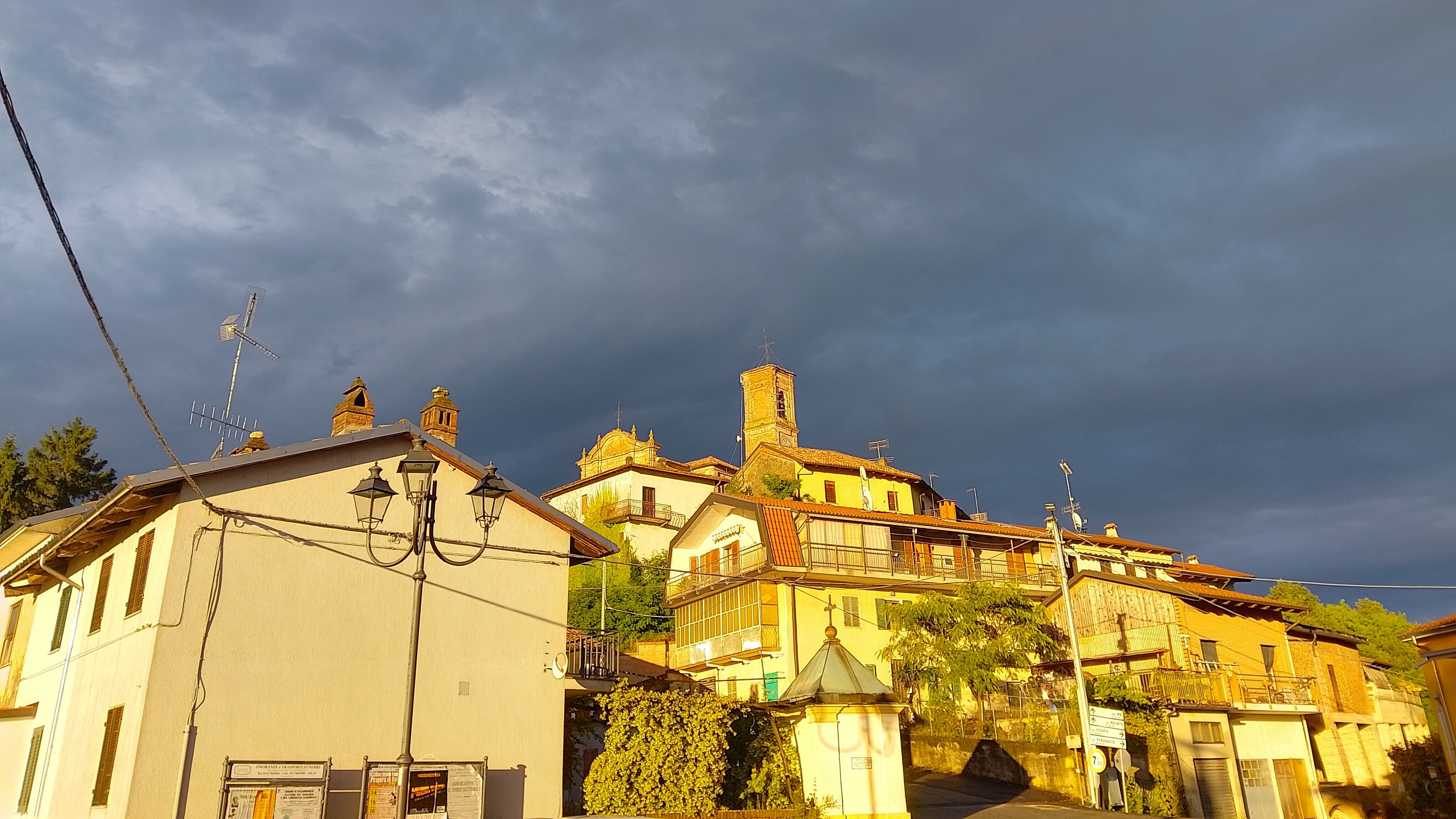
Villamiroglio

== Demographic evolution ==
Historical population

Year	Pop.	±%
1861	1,507	—
1871	1,553	+3.1%
1881	1,573	+1.3%
1901	1,285	−18.3%
1911	1,165	−9.3%

Year	Pop.	±%
1921	1,153	−1.0%
1931	946	−18.0%
1936	939	−0.7%
1951	797	−15.1%
1961	610	−23.5%

Year	Pop.	±%
1971	440	−27.9%
1981	359	−18.4%
1991	331	−7.8%
2001	312	−5.7%

Source: Data from ISTAT
