= Tonco =

- Comune
- Comune di Tonco
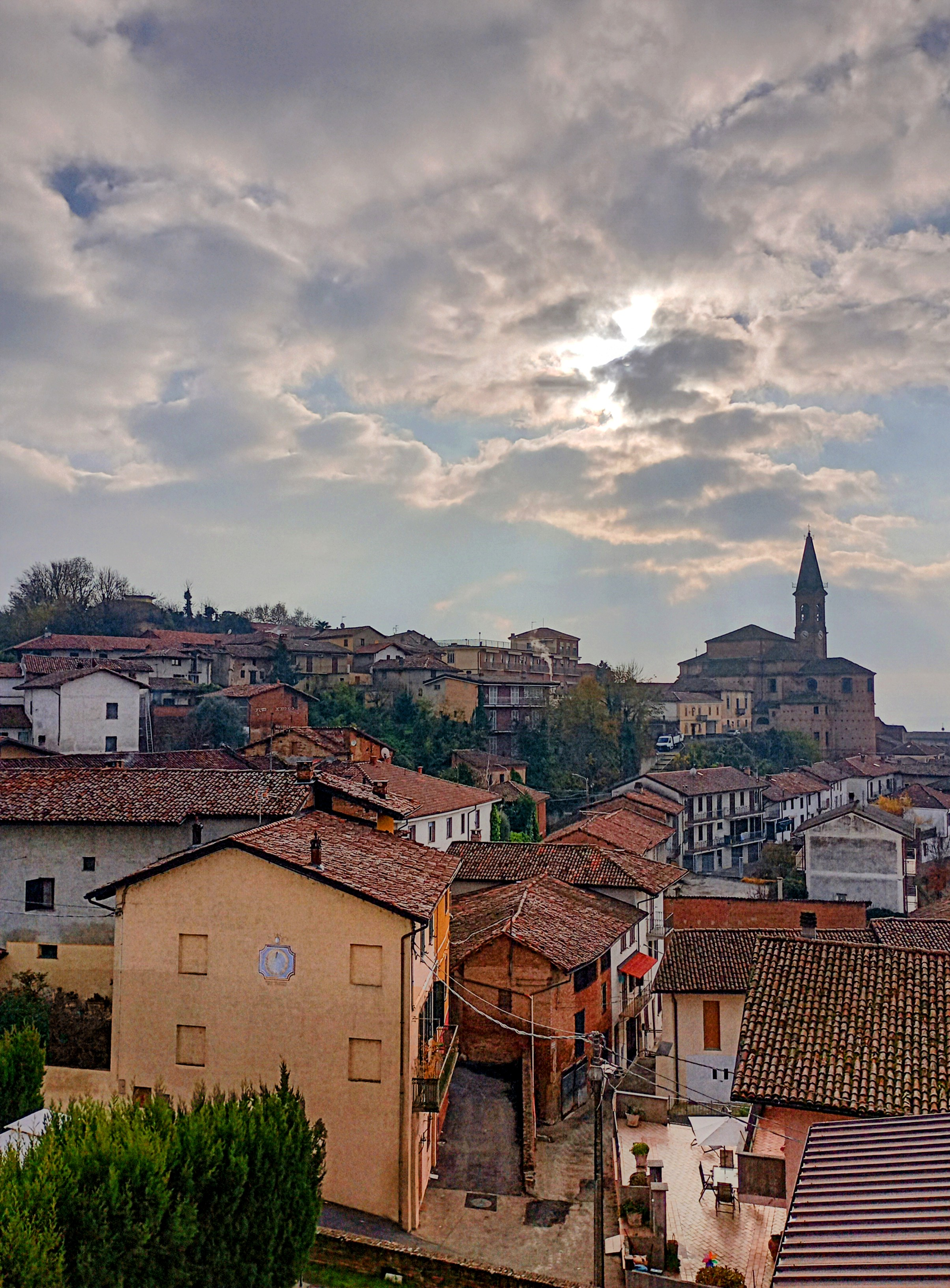

- Location within Italy Location within Piedmont
- Coordinates: 45°1′N 8°11′E
- Country: Italy
- Region: Piedmont
- Province: Province of Asti (AT)

Area
  - Total: 11.8 km^{2} (4.6 sq mi)
- Elevation: 271 m (889 ft)

Population (Dec. 2004)
  - Total: 895
  - Density: 75.8/km^{2} (196/sq mi)
- Time zone: UTC+1 (CET)
  - Summer (DST): UTC+2 (CEST)
- Postal code: 14039
- Dialing code: 0141
- Website: Official website

Tonco is a comune (municipality) in the Province of Asti in the Italian region Piedmont, located about 40 kilometres (25 mi) east of Turin and about 13 kilometres (8 mi) north of Asti. As of 31 December 2004, it had a population of 895 and an area of 11.8 square kilometres (4.6 mi^{2}).

Tonco borders the following municipalities: Alfiano Natta, Calliano, Castell'Alfero, Corsione, Frinco, Montiglio Monferrato, Villa San Secondo, and Villadeati.

== Demographic evolution ==
Historical population

Year	Pop.	±%
1861	1,942	—
1871	2,283	+17.6%
1881	2,456	+7.6%
1901	2,369	−3.5%
1911	1,969	−16.9%

Year	Pop.	±%
1921	1,946	−1.2%
1931	1,713	−12.0%
1936	1,633	−4.7%
1951	1,329	−18.6%
1961	1,190	−10.5%

Year	Pop.	±%
1971	1,022	−14.1%
1981	947	−7.3%
1991	919	−3.0%
2001	891	−3.0%

Source: Data from ISTAT
