= Isnardi =

Isnardi is an Italian surname. Notable people with the surname include:

- Camillo Isnardi (1874–1949), Italian sports shooter
- Paolo Isnardi (c. 1536–1596), Italian late-Renaissance choirmaster and composer

== See also ==
- Isnard
