= Corsione =

- Comune
- Comune di Corsione
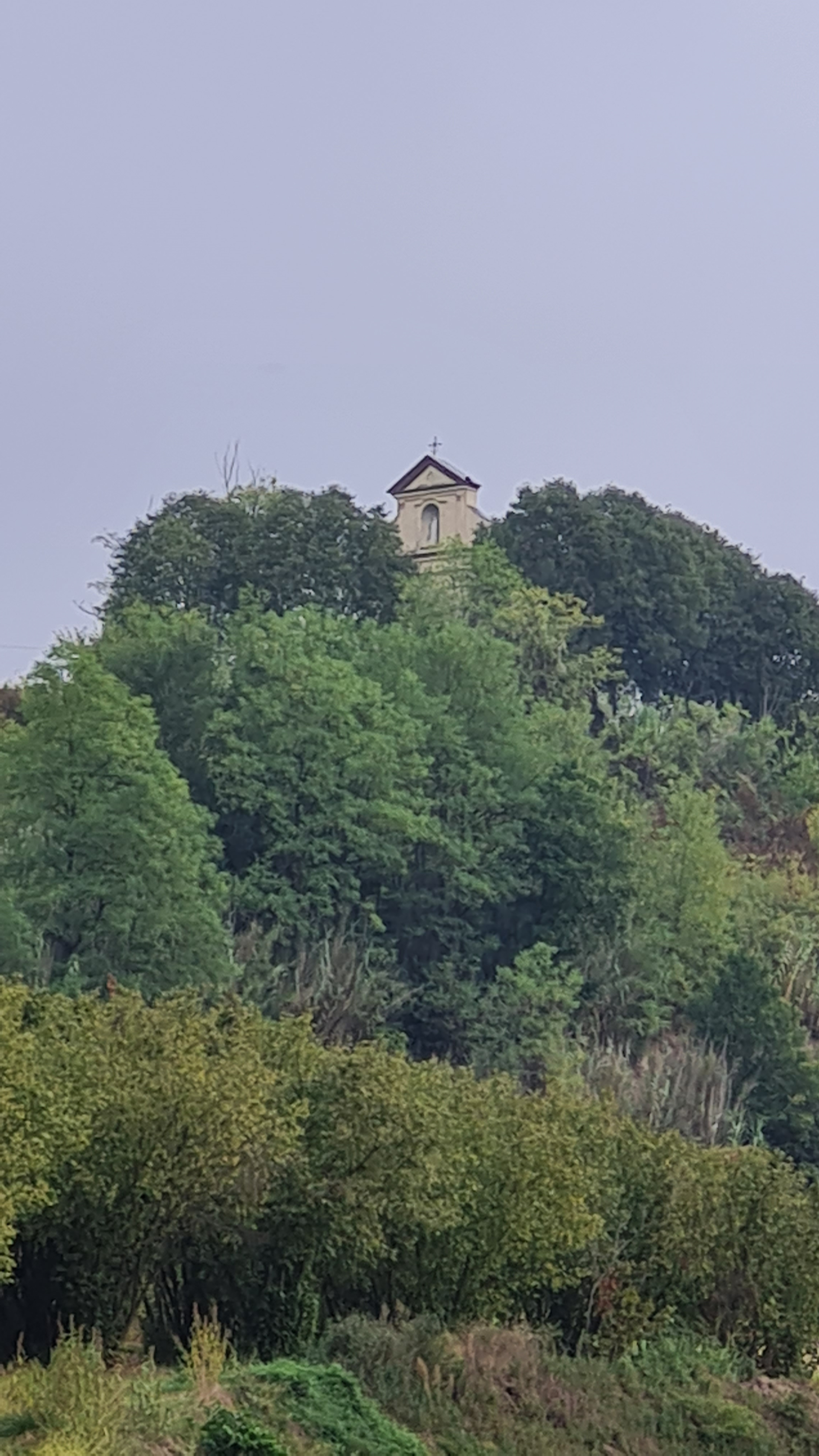

- Location within Italy Location within Piedmont
- Coordinates: 45°0′N 8°9′E
- Country: Italy
- Region: Piedmont
- Province: Province of Asti (AT)

Area
  - Total: 5.2 km^{2} (2.0 sq mi)

Population (Dec. 2004)
  - Total: 183
  - Density: 35/km^{2} (91/sq mi)
- Time zone: UTC+1 (CET)
  - Summer (DST): UTC+2 (CEST)
- Postal code: 14020
- Dialing code: 0141
- Website: Official website

Corsione is a comune (municipality) in the Province of Asti in the Italian region Piedmont, located about 35 kilometres (22 mi) east of Turin and about 12 kilometres (7 mi) northwest of Asti. As of 31 December 2004, it had a population of 183 and an area of 5.2 square kilometres (2.0 mi^{2}).

Corsione borders the following municipalities: Castell'Alfero, Cossombrato, Frinco, Tonco, and Villa San Secondo.

== Demographic evolution ==
Historical population

Year	Pop.	±%
1861	568	—
1871	580	+2.1%
1881	580	+0.0%
1901	647	+11.6%
1911	627	−3.1%

Year	Pop.	±%
1921	598	−4.6%
1931	562	−6.0%
1936	552	−1.8%
1951	454	−17.8%
1961	276	−39.2%

Year	Pop.	±%
1971	231	−16.3%
1981	199	−13.9%
1991	185	−7.0%
2001	169	−8.6%

Source: Data from ISTAT
