= Odalengo Piccolo =

- Comune
- Comune di Odalengo Piccolo
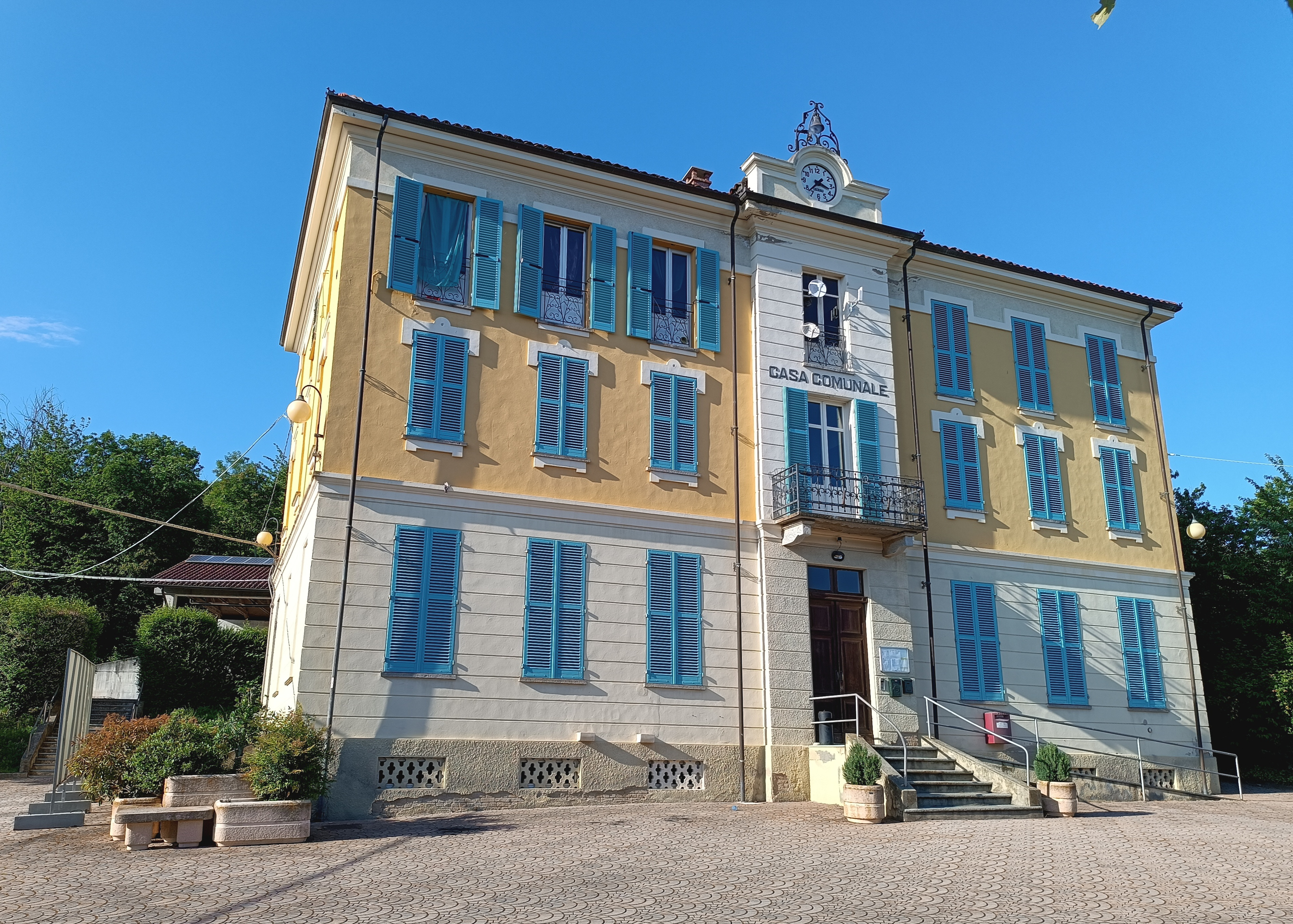

- Coat of arms

- Location within Italy Location within Piedmont
- Coordinates: 45°4′N 8°12′E
- Country: Italy
- Region: Piedmont
- Province: Alessandria (AL)

Government
  - Mayor: Mirella Panatero

Area
  - Total: 7.57 km^{2} (2.92 sq mi)
- Highest elevation: 414 m (1,358 ft)
- Lowest elevation: 134 m (440 ft)

Population (310 November 2017)
  - Total: 266
  - Density: 35.1/km^{2} (91.0/sq mi)
- Demonym: Odalenghesi
- Time zone: UTC+1 (CET)
  - Summer (DST): UTC+2 (CEST)
- Postal code: 15020
- Dialing code: 0141
- Website: Official website

Odalengo Piccolo (Audalengh Cit in Piedmontese) is a commune (comune) of the Province of Alessandria in the northwest Italian region Piedmont. It is located in the Val Cerrina about 40 kilometres (25 mi) east of Turin, about 13 kilometres (8 mi) north of Asti and some 20 kilometres (12 mi) southwest of Casale Monferrato. The municipality extends over an area of 7.63 square kilometres (2.95 mi^{2}) in the hills to the south of the Stura del Monferrato torrent, where areas of woodland are interspersed by vineyards. It borders on the communes of Alfiano Natta, Castelletto Merli, Cerrina Monferrato, Odalengo Grande, and Villadeati.

The two principal centres of population are Serra (dialect: Sèra), the site of the town hall, and Vicinato (dialect: V’žinà) with the parish church; further nuclei are Palmaro (dialect: Cà di Parmàn), Dorato, and Pessine (dialect: Psìn-i) which is notable for its castle.

Odalengo Piccolo is known for the truffle fair Tufo & tartufo, which has been held during the autumn truffle season since 1994, and for the wide variety of antique native apple cultivars that are grown locally.

== Toponyms ==
Odalengo enters the historical record in 1298–99 as Odalengum ultra Sturiam. The form Odalengum minus, which distinguishes ‘Little Odalengo’ from the nearby Odalengo Grande, is recorded in 1306; Odalengum parvum is found in 1320 and Odalengo Prato in 1474.

Vicinato appears as Viscenale in 1279, while Serra is apparently recorded as Serra in 1163 and Pessine as Pisinum in 1171.
