= Ponzano Monferrato =

- Comune
- Comune di Ponzano Monferrato
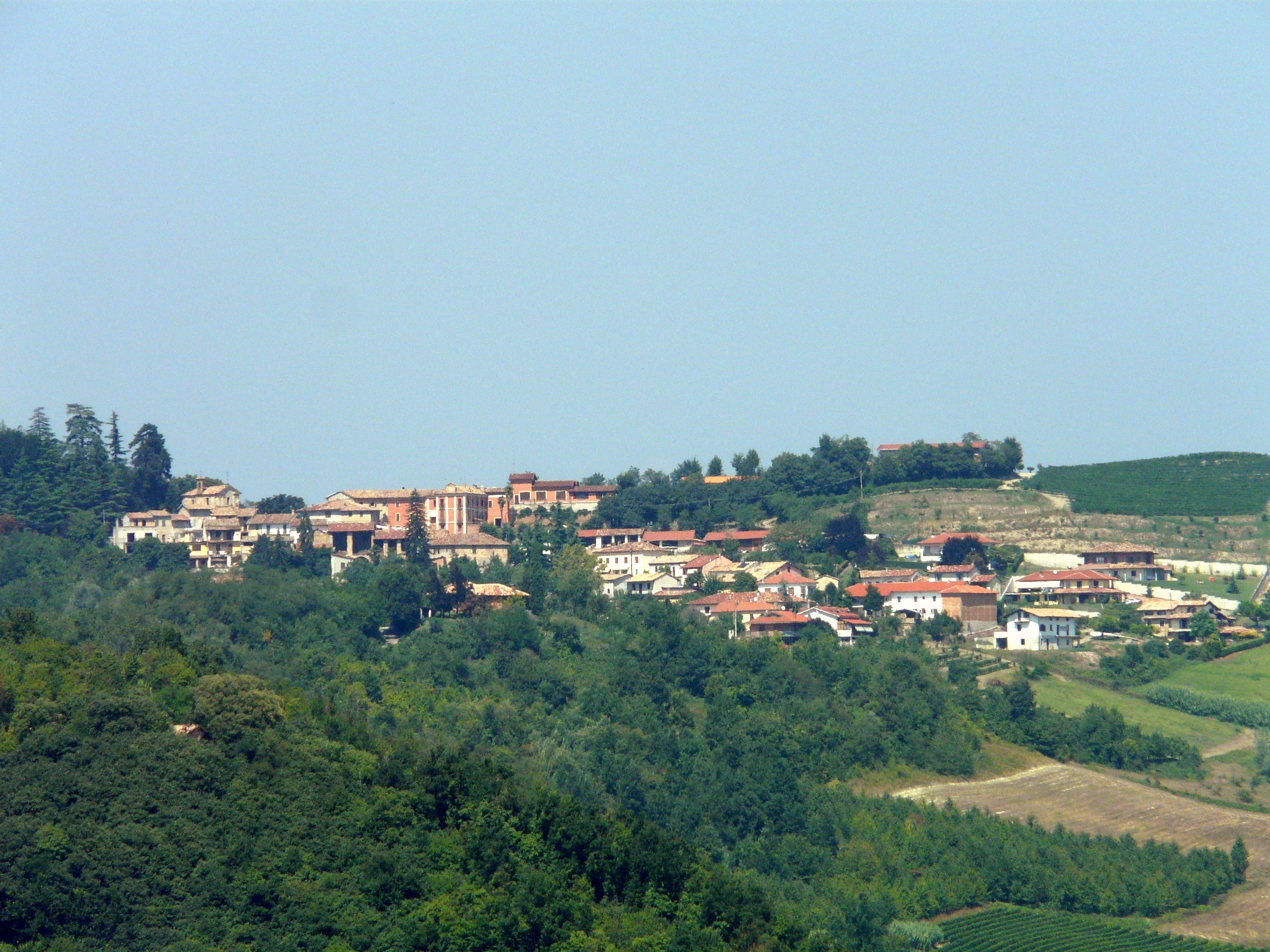

- Location within Italy Location within Piedmont
- Coordinates: 45°5′N 8°16′E
- Country: Italy
- Region: Piedmont
- Province: Alessandria (AL)

Government
  - Mayor: Paolo Lavagno

Area
  - Total: 11.6 km^{2} (4.5 sq mi)
- Elevation: 385 m (1,263 ft)

Population (31 December 2010)
  - Total: 383
  - Density: 33.0/km^{2} (85.5/sq mi)
- Demonym: Ponzanesi
- Time zone: UTC+1 (CET)
  - Summer (DST): UTC+2 (CEST)
- Postal code: 15020
- Dialing code: 0141
- Patron saint: St. John the Baptist
- Saint day: 24 June
- Website: Official website

Ponzano Monferrato is a comune (municipality) in the Province of Alessandria in the Italian region Piedmont, located about 45 kilometres (28 mi) east of Turin and about 35 kilometres (22 mi) northwest of Alessandria.

Ponzano Monferrato borders the following municipalities: Castelletto Merli, Cereseto, Mombello Monferrato, Moncalvo, and Serralunga di Crea.
