= Alfiano Natta =

- Comune
- Comune di Alfiano Natta
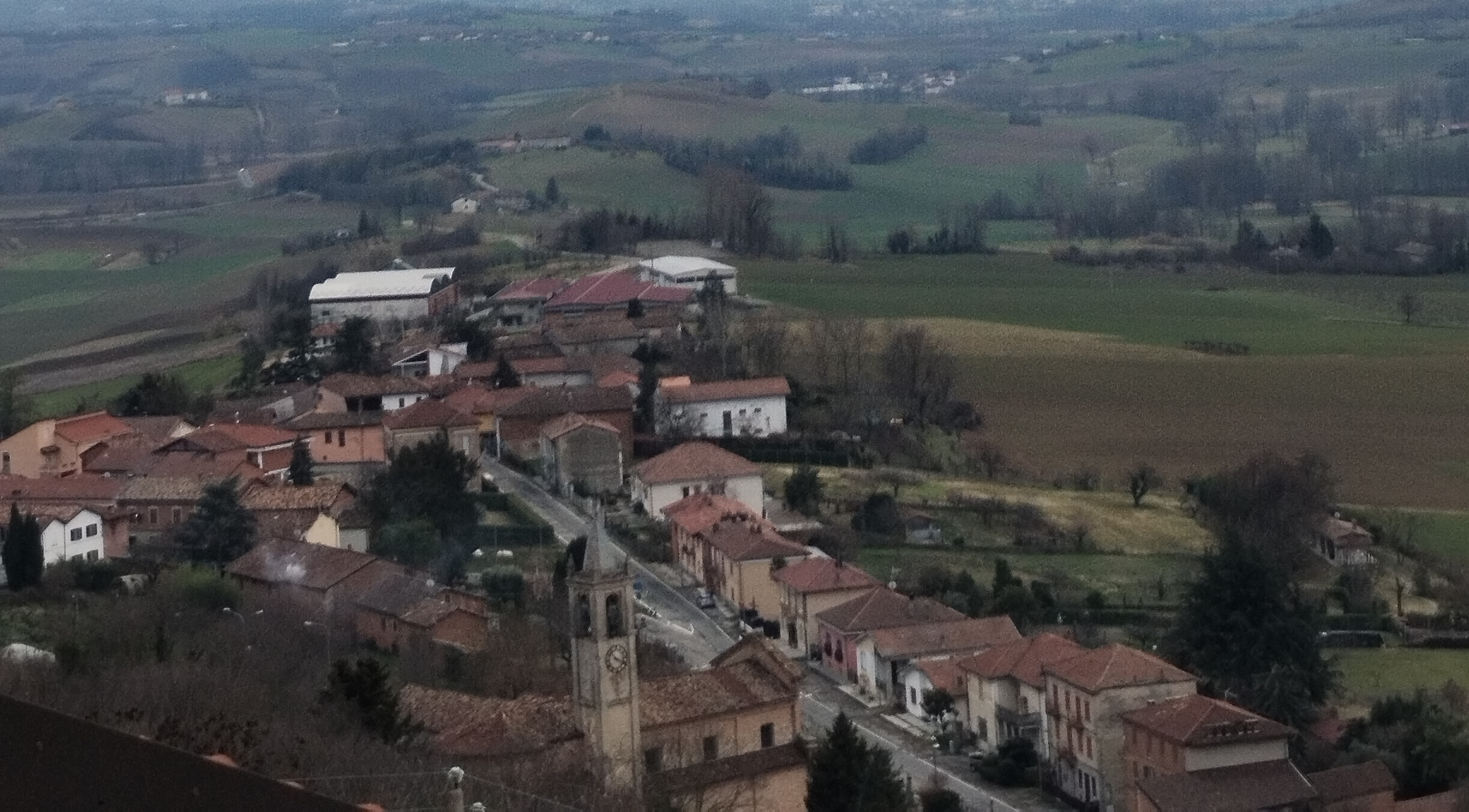

- Location within Italy Location within Piedmont
- Coordinates: 45°2′58″N 8°12′34″E
- Country: Italy
- Region: Piedmont
- Province: Alessandria (AL)
- Frazioni: Cardona, Casarello, Casa Paletti, Sanico

Government
  - Mayor: Sabrina Zeglio

Area
  - Total: 13.16 km^{2} (5.08 sq mi)
- Elevation: 280 m (920 ft)

Population (31 December 2020)
  - Total: 739
  - Density: 56.2/km^{2} (145/sq mi)
- Demonym: Alfianesi
- Time zone: UTC+1 (CET)
  - Summer (DST): UTC+2 (CEST)
- Postal code: 15021
- Dialing code: 0141
- Patron saint: St. Marcian
- Saint day: 3 June
- Website: Official website

Alfiano Natta is a comune (municipality) in the province of Alessandria in the Italian region Piedmont, located about 40 kilometres (25 mi) east of Turin and about 35 kilometres (22 mi) northwest of Alessandria.

Alfiano Natta borders the following municipalities: Calliano, Castelletto Merli, Moncalvo, Odalengo Piccolo, Penango, Tonco, and Villadeati.

Alfiano Natta is a major contributor to the economy of the province of Alessandria. Wine from the comune is sold in Italy and exported. The area is also known for its landscapes and clean air.
