= Cerrina Monferrato =

- Comune
- Comune di Cerrina Monferrato
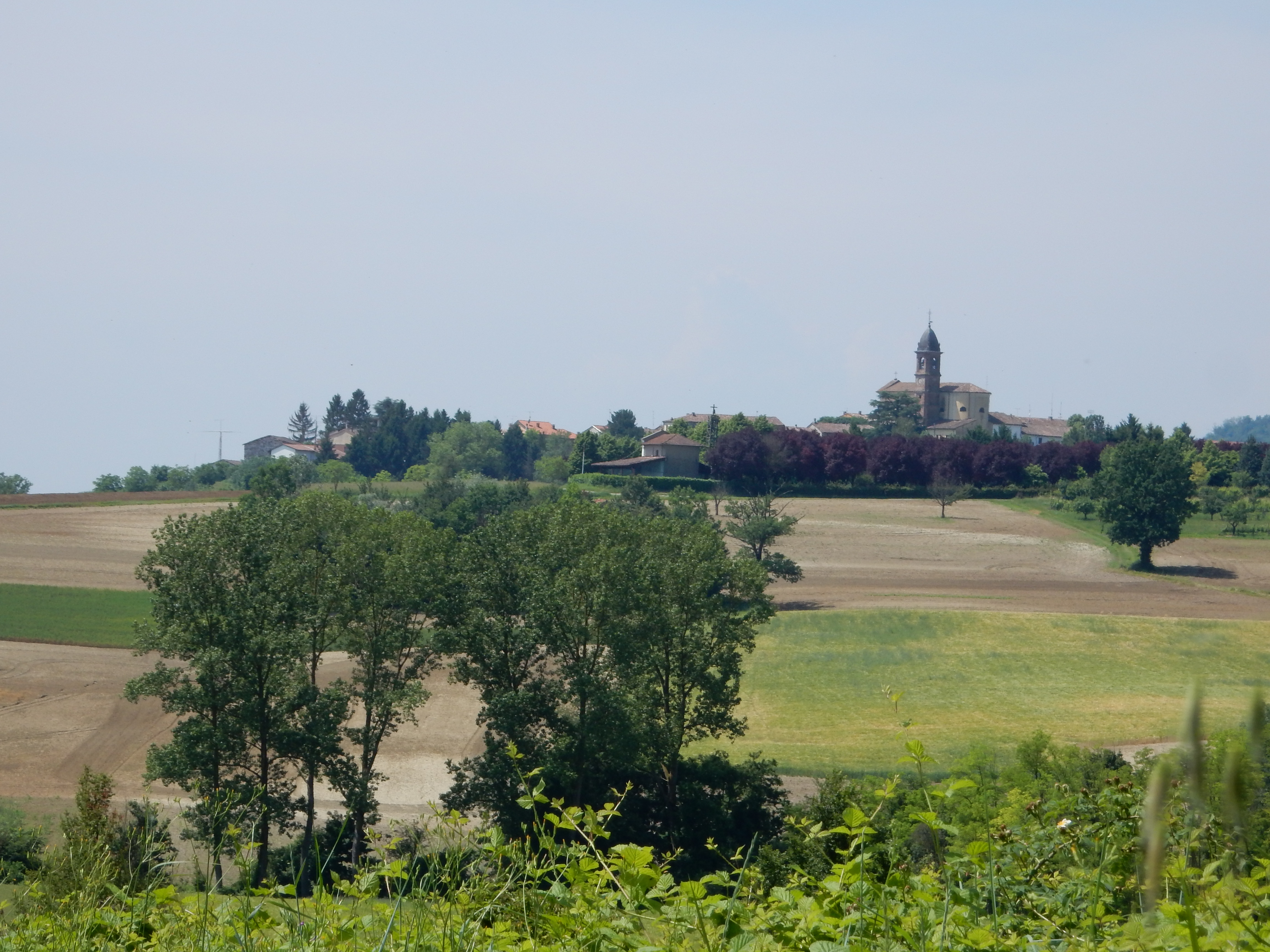

- Coat of arms

- Location within Italy Location within Piedmont
- Coordinates: 45°7′N 8°13′E
- Country: Italy
- Region: Piedmont
- Province: Alessandria (AL)
- Frazioni: Valle, Montalero, Piancerreto, Montaldo, Rosingo

Government
  - Mayor: Marco Cornaglia

Area
  - Total: 17.3 km^{2} (6.7 sq mi)
- Elevation: 225 m (738 ft)

Population (10 January 2021)
  - Total: 1,313
  - Density: 75.9/km^{2} (197/sq mi)
- Time zone: UTC+1 (CET)
  - Summer (DST): UTC+2 (CEST)
- Postal code: 15020
- Dialing code: 0142
- Patron saint: Nazarius and Celsus
- Saint day: 28 July
- Website: Official website

Cerrina Monferrato (population about 1,600) is a commune in the Province of Alessandria in the Italian region Piedmont, located about 40 kilometres (25 mi) east of Turin and about 40 kilometres (25 mi) northwest of Alessandria. Its municipal borders enclose an area of 17.3 square kilometres (6.7 mi^{2}) ranging in elevation from 158 to 422 metres (518 to 1,385 ft) above sea level. The commune borders Gabiano to the north, Mombello Monferrato to the east, Castelletto Merli and Odalengo Piccolo to the south, and Odalengo Grande and Villamiroglio to the west. The two principal population centres are Valle Cerrina which had a population of 583 at the time of the 2001 census, and Cerrina itself, the historic centre and capoluogo which had a population of 353. Montalero (pop. 35) and Rosingo (pop. 261) were both communes in their own right until 1928. The other settlements include Montaldo, Piancerreto and Gaminella: although the last lies mostly within the commune of Mombello Monferrato.

== History ==
In 2005 Cerrina was the centre of swarms of locusts or grasshoppers (the local Calliptamus italicus) which, unprecedented in their magnitude and moving at speeds of up to 55 kilometres per hour (34 mph), threatened the vineyards of Monferrato and the province of Asti.
