= Odalengo Grande =

- Comune
- Comune di Odalengo Grande
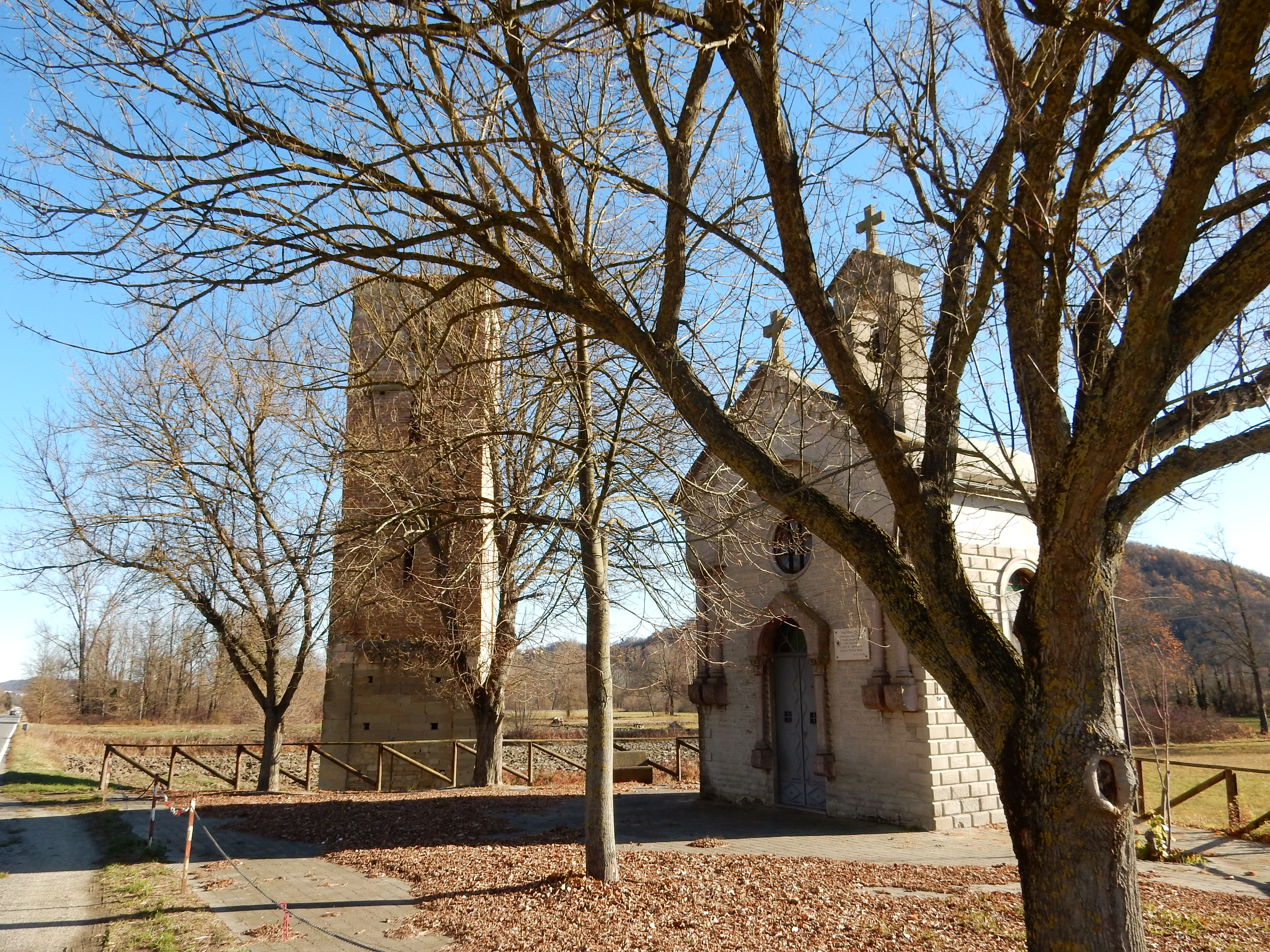

- Coat of arms

- Location within Italy Location within Piedmont
- Coordinates: 45°7′N 8°10′E
- Country: Italy
- Region: Piedmont
- Province: Alessandria (AL)

Government
  - Mayor: Fabio Olivero (elected 16 May 2011)

Area
  - Total: 15.43 km^{2} (5.96 sq mi)
- Elevation: 381 m (1,250 ft)

Population (30 November 2017)
  - Total: 418
  - Density: 27.1/km^{2} (70.2/sq mi)
- Demonym: Odalenghesi
- Time zone: UTC+1 (CET)
  - Summer (DST): UTC+2 (CEST)
- Postal code: 15020
- Dialing code: 0142
- Website: Official website

Odalengo Grande (Audalengh Grand in Piedmontese) is a comune (municipality) in the Province of Alessandria in the Italian region Piedmont, located about 35 kilometres (22 mi) east of Turin and about 40 kilometres (25 mi) northwest of Alessandria.

Odalengo Grande borders the following municipalities: Cerrina Monferrato, Murisengo, Odalengo Piccolo, Robella, Verrua Savoia, Villadeati, and Villamiroglio.
