= Castell'Alfero =

- Comune
- Comune di Castell'Alfero
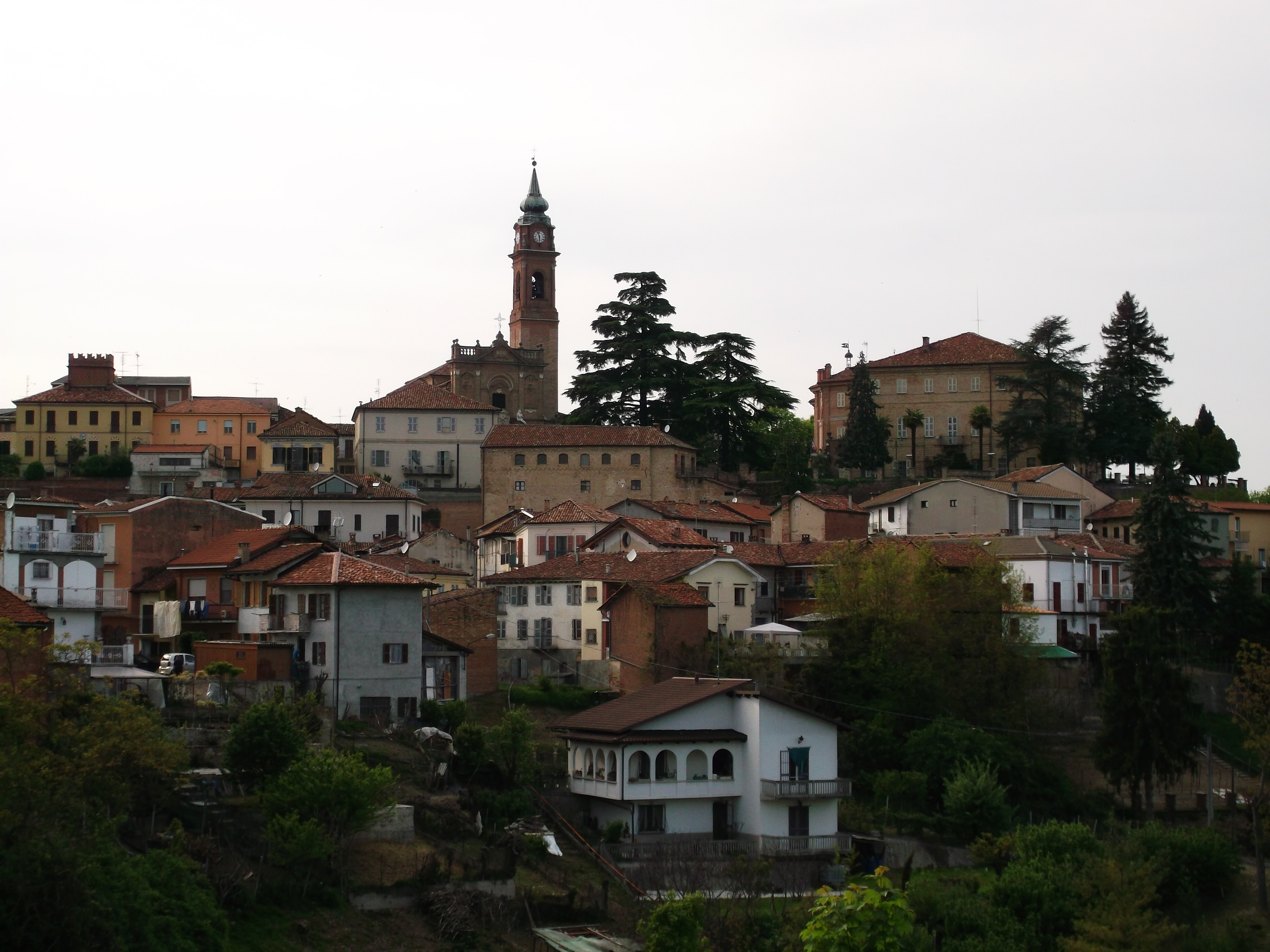
- View of Castell'Alfero

- Coat of arms

- Location within Italy Location within Piedmont
- Coordinates: 44°59′N 8°13′E
- Country: Italy
- Region: Piedmont
- Province: Asti (AT)
- Frazioni: Callianetto, Stazione, Casotto, Serra Perno, Noveiva, Moncucco, Bricco Beretta

Government
  - Mayor: Angelo Marengo

Area
  - Total: 20.0 km^{2} (7.7 sq mi)
- Elevation: 235 m (771 ft)

Population (1 January 2016)
  - Total: 2,763
  - Density: 138/km^{2} (358/sq mi)
- Demonym: Castellalferesi
- Time zone: UTC+1 (CET)
  - Summer (DST): UTC+2 (CEST)
- Postal code: 14033
- Dialing code: 0141
- Patron saint: Sts. Peter and Paul
- Saint day: First Sunday in September
- Website: Official website

Castell'Alfero (Piedmontese: Castel Alfé) is a comune (municipality) in the Province of Asti in the Italian region Piedmont, located about 40 kilometres (25 mi) east of Turin and about 9 kilometres (6 mi) north of Asti.

Castell'Alfero borders the following municipalities: Asti, Calliano, Corsione, Cossombrato, Frinco, Tonco, and Villa San Secondo.

== Twin towns ==
Castell'Alfero is twinned with:

- Lafrançaise, France
