= Montiglio Monferrato Castle =

Castle in Piedmont, Italy

- Castello di Montiglio Monferrato
- Montiglio Monferrato, Piedmont, Italy
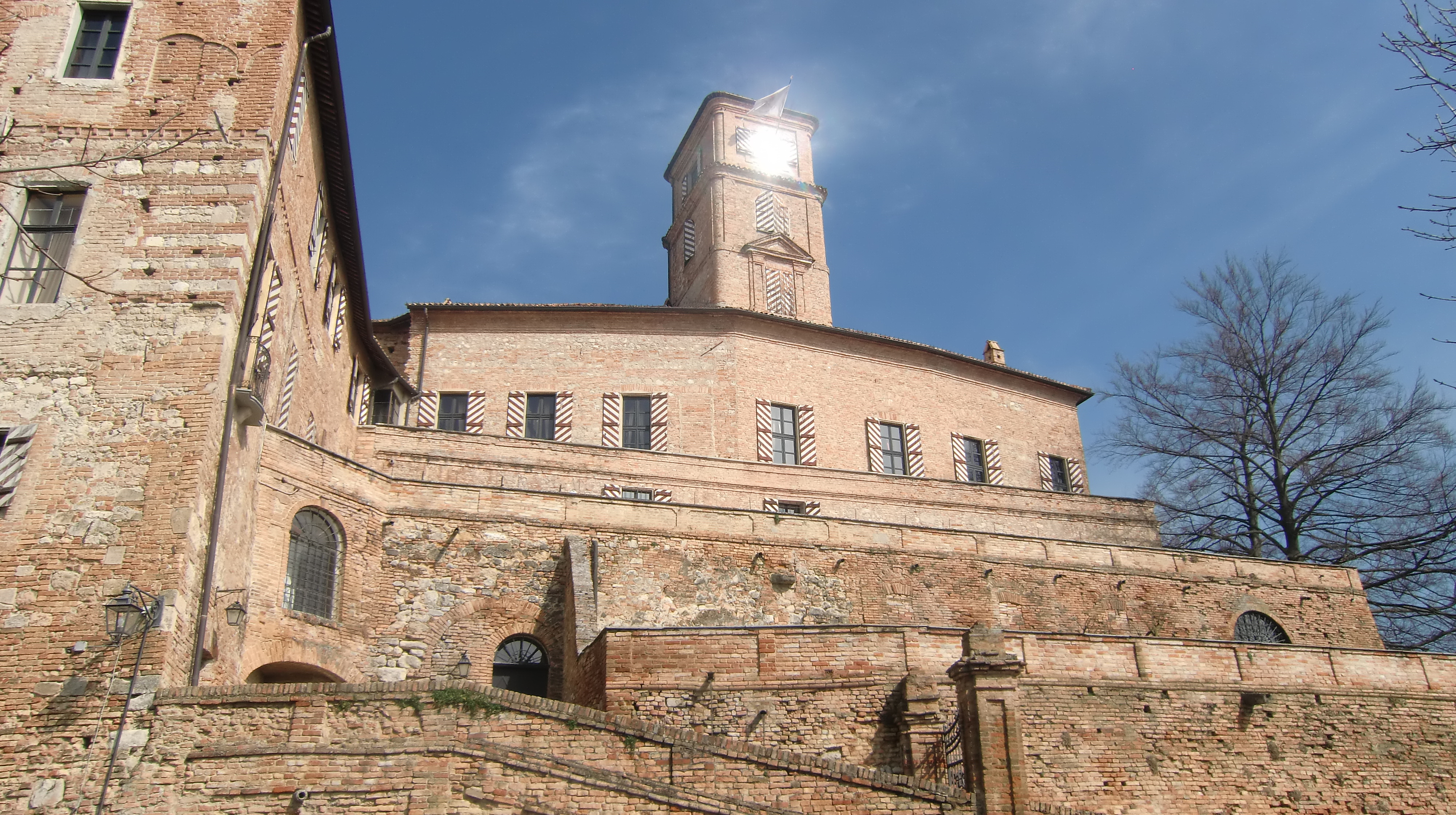
- Montiglio Monferrato Castle in 2011

Site information
- Type: Castle

Location
- Coordinates: 45°04′04.2″N 8°05′50.62″E

Montiglio Monferrato Castle (Italian: Castello di Montiglio Monferrato) is a castle located in Montiglio Monferrato, Piedmont, Italy.

== History ==
The foundations of the castle date back to the 9th century, and as early as the 10th century it was serving as an advanced stronghold of the March of Montferrat. The medieval structure was destroyed in 1305 during the conflicts between Asti and the Marquises of Monferrato, and was later rebuilt. In the following centuries, the castle underwent various alterations: in the 16th century defensive bastions were added; in the 18th century it was reorganized with more residential functions, introducing spaces such as an elegant music hall, a grand staircase, a terrace, and a portico overlooking the garden.

At the beginning of the 20th century, the castle was put up for sale and acquired by Walter Levi, who initiated renovation works.

== Description ==
The castle has an irregular, elongated L-shaped layout, the remnant of an original U-shaped plan that once included a central keep. Rising above it is a three-storey tower.
