= Achille-Nicolas Isnard =

French economist (1748–1803)

Achille-Nicolas Isnard (Paris, 1748 - Lyon, 1803) was a French political economist and engineer at the Ponts et Chaussées (public works) of Paris. He is known for his firm disapproval of the physiocratic theory, and his early contribution to mathematical economics.

== Biography ==
Achille-Nicolas Isnard was born in Paris. He first studied some mathematics, map drawing and fortification, before attending the École Nationale des Ponts et Chaussées, nowadays the École des ponts ParisTech, from 1767 to 1773. In 1775 he started his career as assistant engineer in Arbois, near the Swiss border. Later he was employed as engineer at the Ponts et Chaussées (public works) of Paris.

In 1781, at the age of 33, Isnard anonymously published his Traité des richesses, in two volumes with the London publisher François Grasset. Later in 1801 he published his Considérations théoriques sur les caisses d'amortissement de dette publique, under his own name in Paris. The former is directed against the theory of the produit net and of the single tax of Quesnay; Isnard does not mention Adam Smith, although generally concurring with the latter's views on the origin of wealth, the effects of protection, and of the accumulation of gold and silver, etc.

As an engineer Isnard frequently had recourse to mathematical symbols, although he did not venture farther than equations of the first degree and simple problems in the rule of three. As having done this, he is mentioned by Stanley Jevons in his Theory of Political Economy.

== Work ==
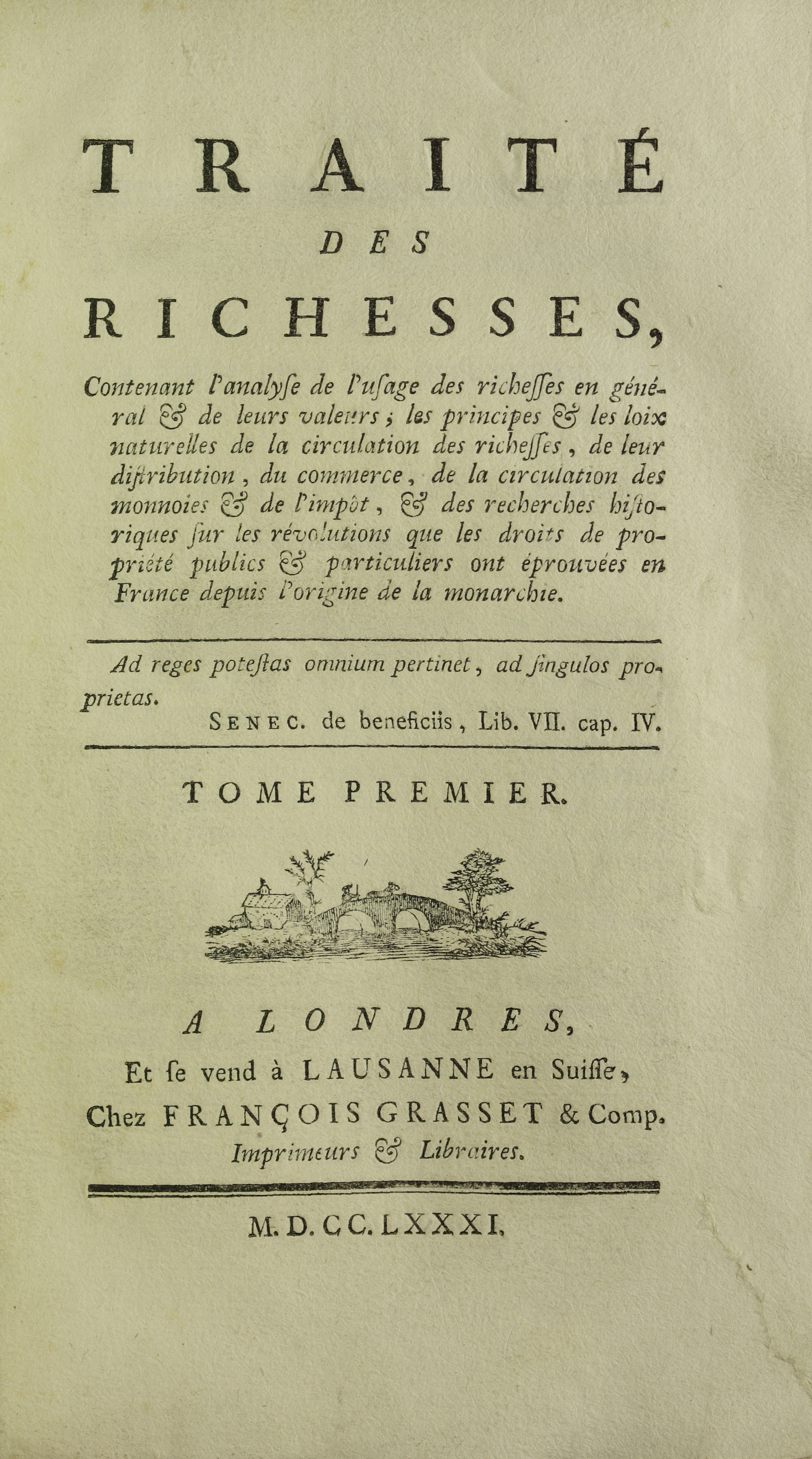
Traité des richesses, 1781 (from BEIC, biblioteca digitale.)

=== Criticizing the physiocratic theory ===
Isnard criticized the physiocratic theory, because of its claim that the agricultural sector was the only productive sector in the economy. He argued that François Quesnay in his 1758 Tableau économique had already shown that both the agricultural and the manufacturing sector generated income. In real life the productivity of a sector depends on its surplus product. Isnard (1781; xv) argued:

"The values of the different products determine the portions of total wealth allotted to the various producers; these portions change with the values of the objects which each producer has to acquire for production".

According to Fox (2005) Isnard started "with a system of the division of labour with only two commodities. Each producer produces a certain amount of one commodity, a part of which he uses as a means of production and as a means of subsistence. He swaps the sectoral surplus for the other commodity he is in need of, but does not produce himself."

=== Science of man ===
In his 1781 treatise "Traité des richesses" Isnard proposed a science of man. According to Fox (2012):

"In this treatise, Isnard defined the "science of man" as a kind of mechanics based on the rational decomposition and recomposition of individual interests. Territory as well could be decomposed and recomposed. The creation of the departments at the beginning of the Revolution was nothing else than the result of a decomposition of the old system of regions and its replacement in a process of rationalised recomposition. Engineers, however, applied this method mainly to technical devices, as well as to the process of production which they perceived as a combination of workers' moves giving birth to technical operations."

== Works ==
- Isnard, Achille-Nicolas (1781). Traité des richesses. 1. A Londres, et se vend a Lausanne en Suisse: François Grasset.
- Isnard, Achille-Nicolas (1781). Traité des richesses. 2. A Londres, et se vend a Lausanne en Suisse: François Grasset.
- Isnard, Achille-Nicolas (1781). Considérations theoriques sur les caisses d'amortissement de dette publique, Paris.
- Isnard, Achille-Nicolas (1789). "Observations sur le principe qui a produit les révolutions de France, de Genève et d'Amérique, dans le dix-huitieme siecle;", A Évreux. De l'Imprimerie de la Veuve Malassis, imprim. du Roi & de monseigneur l'evêque. Octobre
