= Moncalvo =

- Comune
- Città di Moncalvo
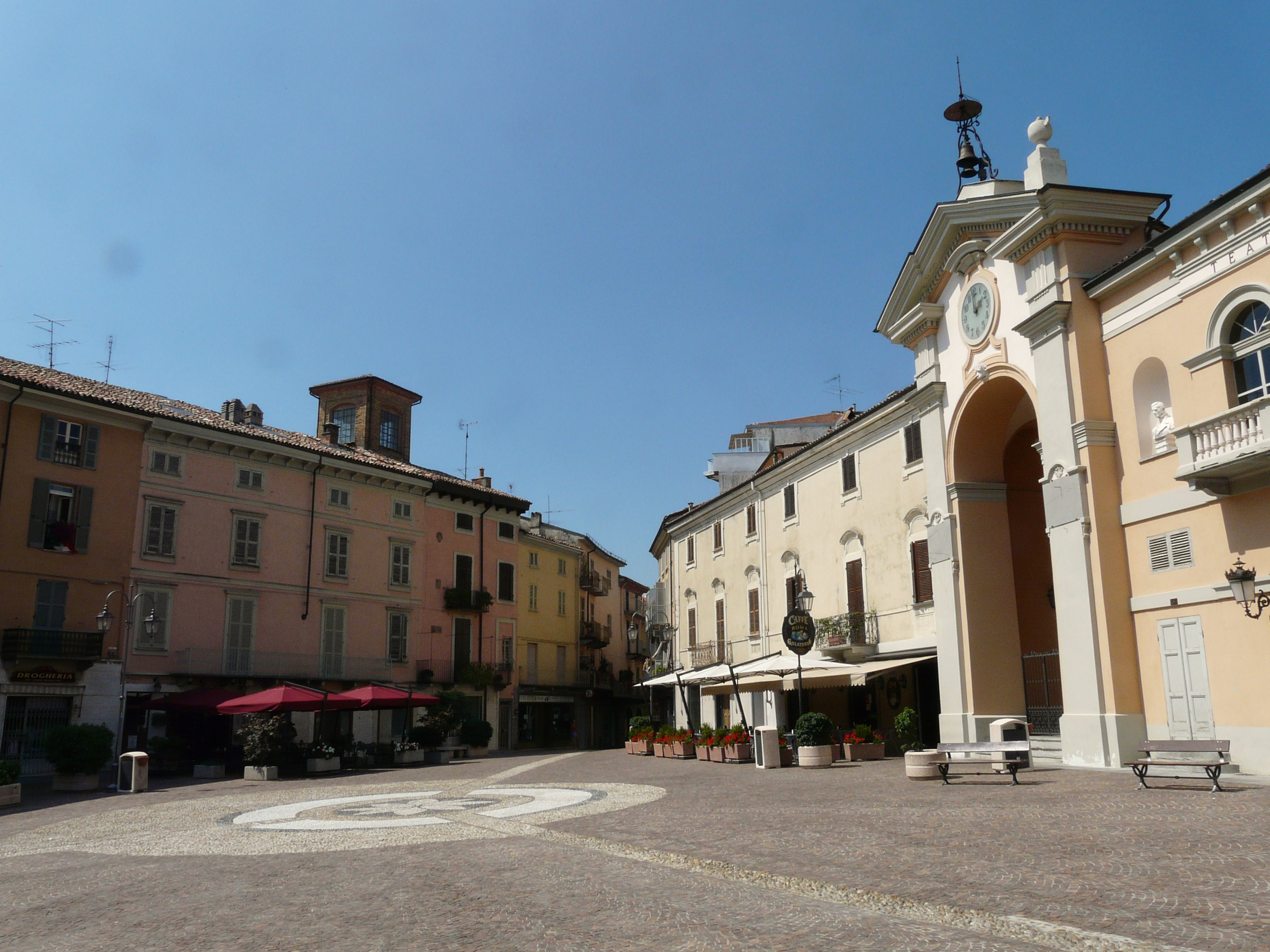
- View of Moncalvo

- Coat of arms

- Location within Italy Location within Piedmont
- Coordinates: 45°3′N 8°16′E
- Country: Italy
- Region: Piedmont
- Province: Asti (AT)
- Frazioni: Castellino, Patro, Santa Maria, Gessi, Stazione

Government
  - Mayor: Diego Musumeci

Area
  - Total: 17.7 km^{2} (6.8 sq mi)
- Elevation: 305 m (1,001 ft)

Population (31 October 2017)
  - Total: 2,967
  - Density: 168/km^{2} (434/sq mi)
- Demonym: Moncalvini
- Time zone: UTC+1 (CET)
  - Summer (DST): UTC+2 (CEST)
- Postal code: 14036
- Dialing code: 0141
- Patron saint: St. Anthony of Padua
- Saint day: June 13
- Website: Official website

Moncalvo is a village and comune in the Province of Asti in the Italian region Piedmont, located about 45 kilometres (28 mi) east of Turin and about 15 kilometres (9 mi) northeast of Asti on the national road SS 547 which links Asti to Casale Monferrato and Vercelli. Historically it was part of the state of Montferrat and was of particular importance during the early years of the Paleologi period of the marquisate. Its best-known inhabitants were the Baroque painter Guglielmo Caccia and ‘La Bella Rosin’, King Victor Emmanuel II’s favourite mistress and eventually wife.

Moncalvo borders the following municipalities: Alfiano Natta, Castelletto Merli, Cereseto, Grana, Grazzano Badoglio, Ottiglio, Penango, and Ponzano Monferrato.

== History ==
The fondation dates back to Romans, in Middle Age the village was under the Asti bishopric, until it became part of March of Montferrat, of which it became his capital city. In 1691, the village was plunded by Prince Eugene of Savoy's troops. In 1704, the village was annexed to Savoy House domains.

=== Jewish community ===
Since XVI century, in Moncalvo has been settled an important Jewish community: in 1731, Jewish people were 176 out of about 1700 total inhabitants.

Their Ghetto had the particularity of being in the city center (usually ghettos were far away from city center and main churches), and moreover, the Jewish synagogue faces the center place of Moncalvo.

The main document concerning Jewish Moncalveses is La Gran Battaja dj'Abrei d'Moncalv (The Big Battle of Moncalvese Jews), that is a Piedmontese ballad, written in Judaeo-Piedmontese by a non-Jew local writer, that is underlining how much Jewish Moncalveses were integrated in the Moncalvo society.

The Moncalvese Jewish community has been extinguished after WW2, but his demographic decline persisted since centuries before.

== Main sights ==
Churches in the town include:

- Sant'Antonio da Padova, 10th century parish church
- San Francesco d’Assisi. Built in 1272, rebuilt in 1644, now parish church
- San Antonio Abate, built in 1623
- Madonna delle Grazie. Originally an oratory of the 16th century, rebuilt by Magnocavalli (1756-58).
- San Marco - 15th century church adjacent to hospital
- San Rocco, erected im 1600
- San Giovanni Battista - church erected 1960
- Chiesa dell’ Annunciazione (dell’ Ospizio) - near Palazzo Cissello
- San Pietro in Vincoli, in strada Gessi, 18th century
- Santa Croce a Patro - church erected in 16th century
- Santa Caterina d’Alessandria in frazione Castellino - Church erected first in 1584; presently a 19th century reconstruction
- San Giorgio presso Castellino - chapel remains of parish church
- Santa Maria delle Peschiere in frazione Santa Maria - Documented since 1573, rebuilt in 1624, and again 1754
