= Antoine-Tristan Danty d'Isnard =

French botanist (1663–1743)

Antoine-Tristan Danty d'Isnard (12 May 1663–12 May 1743) was a French botanist.

== Biography ==
Antoine-Tristan Danty d'Isnard was born, in London, 12 May 1663. He was the son of a botanist—the eldest of five children. His father was called on by King Charles II of England (1630-1685) to fight a plague epidemic in 1661.

The Danty d'Isnard family returned to France in 1668. Antoine-Tristan obtained his doctorat in 1703 in Paris.

On the death of Joseph Pitton de Tournefort in 1708, Danty d'Isnard briefly succeeded him at the Jardin des Plantes but resigned soon after and was replaced by Antoine de Jussieu. He became deputy botanist at the French Academy of Sciences on 25 January 1716, associate chemist on 11 August 1721 and associate botanist on 20 August 1722.

He signed the Jardin du Roi plant catalogue in 1709. He collected numerous plants from the Parisian region, where he worked with Rournefort, Sébastien Valliant and Antoine de Jussieu. His herbarium, purchased by Philibert Commerson and then by Adrien-Henri de Jussieu is conserved in the National Museum of Natural History (France).
