= SS Ponzano =

Coordinates: 51°29′N 1°25′E

History
- Owner: MacAndrews Line
- Launched: 21 December 1927
- Fate: Sunk 1939

General characteristics
- Type: Cargo ship
- Tonnage: 1,346 GRT

MS Ponzano was a British cargo ship. It was one of the first British merchant vessels to be sunk during the Second World War. Ponzano, 1,346 tons, was built in 1928 for the MacAndrews Line service between Britain and Spain.

On 13 November 1939, Ponzano hit a mine and sank off North Foreland. Its crew was rescued by two Norwegian fishing boats.

The ship's fate was blamed on a wrongly decoded radio signal, which delayed minesweeping trawlers from passing on a warning about the extent of mines laid by the Germans.
