= Frinco =

- Comune
- Comune di Frinco
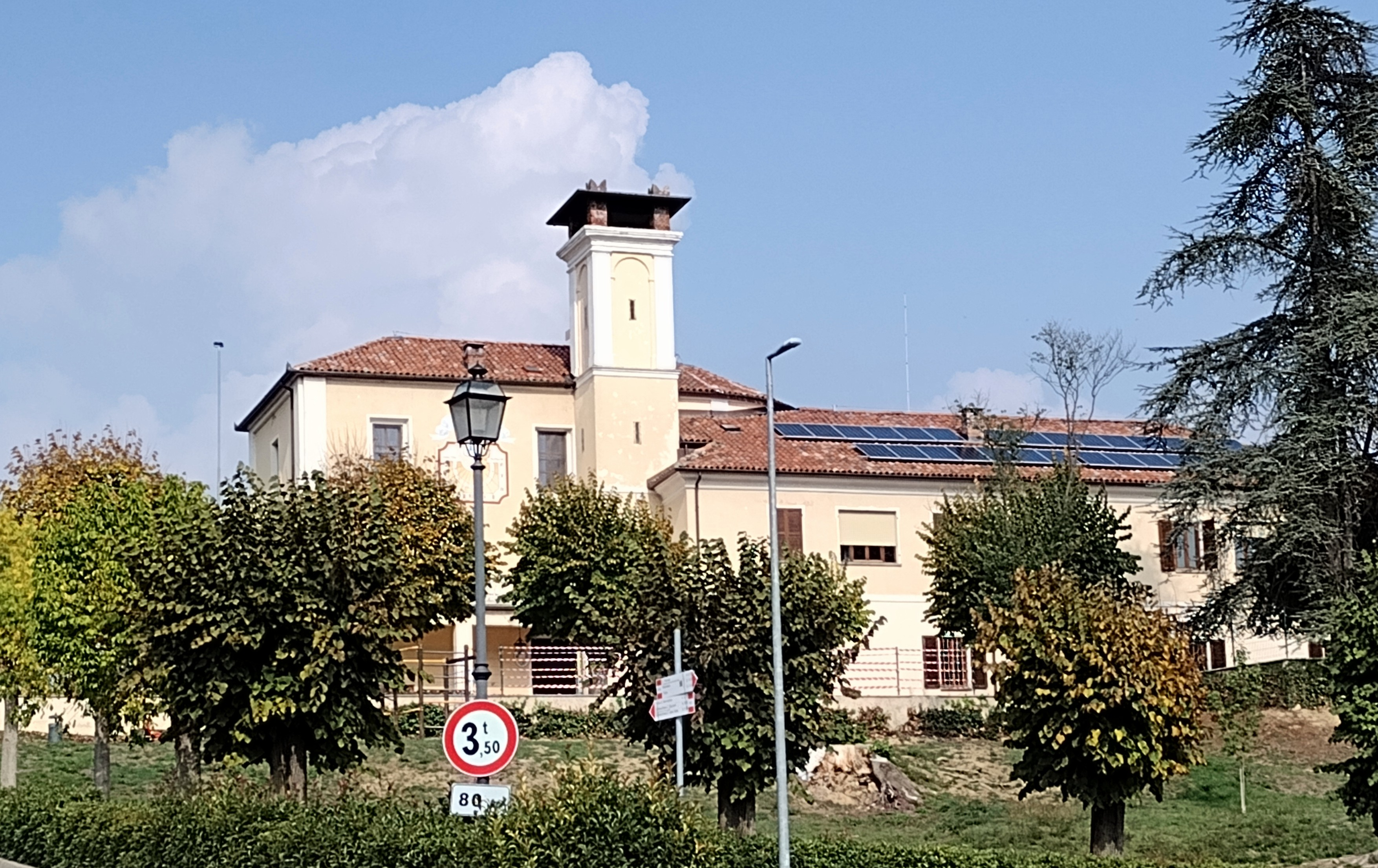

- Coat of arms

- Location within Italy Location within Piedmont
- Coordinates: 45°0′N 8°10′E
- Country: Italy
- Region: Piedmont
- Province: Province of Asti (AT)
- Frazioni: Molinasso, S. Defendente, Bricco Morra, Bricco Rampone

Government
  - Mayor: ß

Area
  - Total: 7.3 km^{2} (2.8 sq mi)

Population (December 2004)
  - Total: 752
  - Density: 100/km^{2} (270/sq mi)
- Demonym: Frinchesi
- Time zone: UTC+1 (CET)
  - Summer (DST): UTC+2 (CEST)
- Postal code: 14030
- Dialing code: 0141

Frinco is a comune (municipality) in the Province of Asti in the Italian region of Piedmont, located about 40 kilometres (25 mi) east of Turin and about 11 kilometres (7 mi) north of Asti. As of 31 December 2004, it had a population of 752 and an area of 7.3 km^{2} (2.8 sq mi).

The municipality of Frinco contains the frazioni (subdivisions, mainly villages and hamlets) Molinasso, S. Defendente, Bricco Morra and Bricco Rampone.

Frinco borders the following municipalities: Castell'Alfero, Corsione, Tonco, and Villa San Secondo.

== Demographic evolution ==
Historical population

Year	Pop.	±%
1861	1,466	—
1871	1,505	+2.7%
1881	1,637	+8.8%
1901	1,599	−2.3%
1911	1,462	−8.6%

Year	Pop.	±%
1921	1,396	−4.5%
1931	1,392	−0.3%
1936	1,369	−1.7%
1951	1,075	−21.5%
1961	893	−16.9%

Year	Pop.	±%
1971	701	−21.5%
1981	640	−8.7%
1991	636	−0.6%
2001	690	+8.5%

Source: Data from ISTAT
