= Murisengo Monferrato =

- Comune
- Comune di Murisengo Monferrato
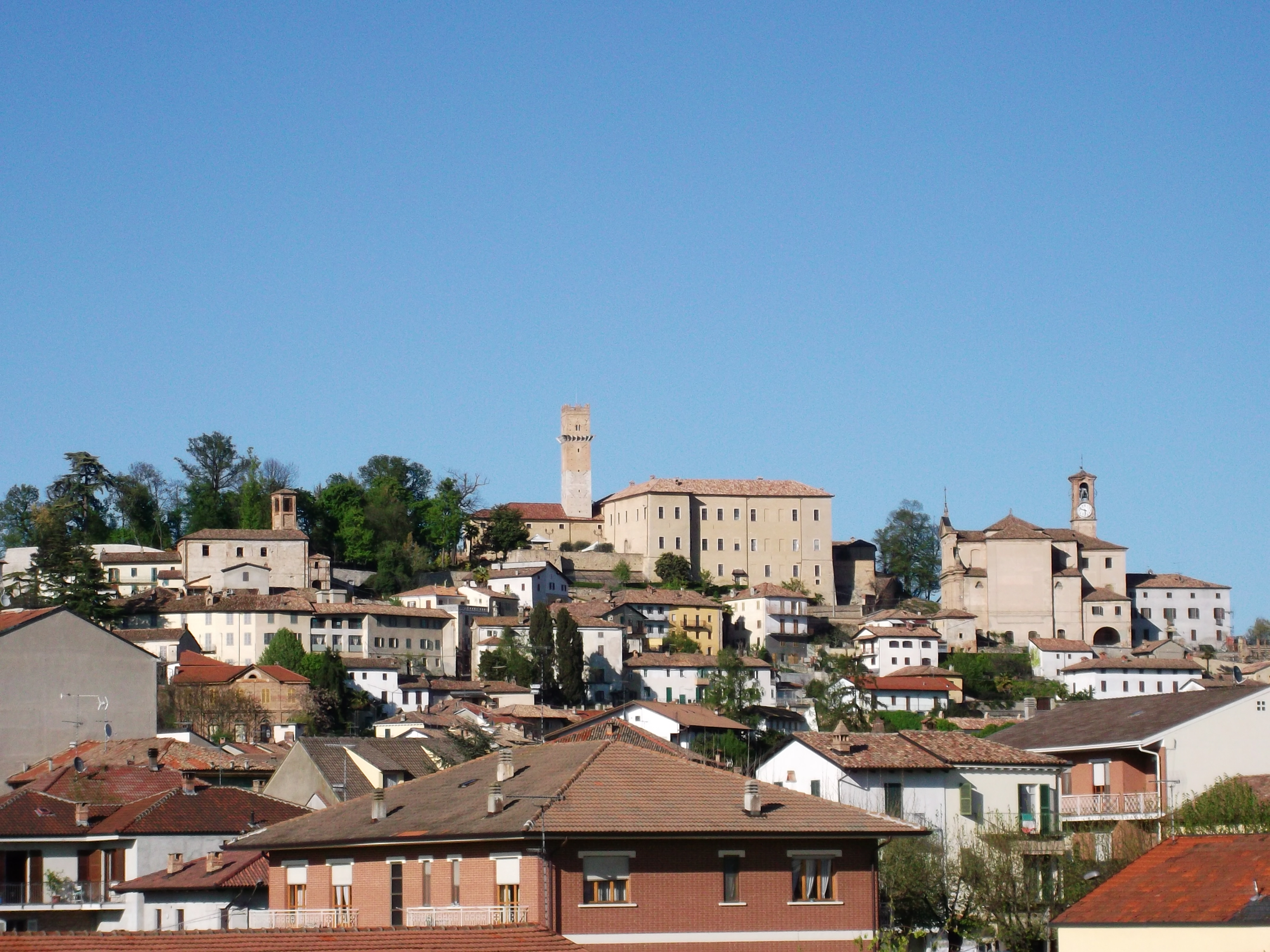

- Coat of arms

- Location within Italy Location within Piedmont
- Coordinates: 45°5′N 8°8′E
- Country: Italy
- Region: Piedmont
- Province: Alessandria (AL)
- Frazioni: Bricco, Case Battia, Corteranzo, Gallo, San Candido, Sorina

Government
  - Mayor: Giovanni Baroero

Area
  - Total: 15.2 km^{2} (5.9 sq mi)
- Elevation: 338 m (1,109 ft)

Population (1 January 2014)
  - Total: 1,429
  - Density: 94.0/km^{2} (243/sq mi)
- Demonym: Murisenghesi
- Time zone: UTC+1 (CET)
  - Summer (DST): UTC+2 (CEST)
- Postal code: 15020
- Dialing code: 0141

Murisengo Monferrato is a comune (municipality) in the Province of Alessandria in the Italian region Piedmont, located about 35 kilometres (22 mi) east of Turin and about 40 kilometres (25 mi) northwest of Alessandria.
