= Mombello Monferrato =

- Comune
- Comune di Mombello Monferrato
- Coat of arms

- Location within Italy Location within Piedmont
- Coordinates: 45°8′N 8°15′E
- Country: Italy
- Region: Piedmont
- Province: Alessandria (AL)
- Frazioni: Casalino, Gaminella, Ilengo, Morsingo, Pozzengo, Zenevreto

Government
  - Mayor: Piergaetano Tonellotto

Area
  - Total: 19.9 km^{2} (7.7 sq mi)
- Elevation: 273 m (896 ft)

Population (2005)
  - Total: 1,110
  - Density: 55.8/km^{2} (144/sq mi)
- Time zone: UTC+1 (CET)
  - Summer (DST): UTC+2 (CEST)
- Postal code: 15020
- Dialing code: 0142
- Website: Official website

Mombello Monferrato is a comune (municipality) in the Province of Alessandria in the Italian region Piedmont, located about 45 kilometres (28 mi) east of Turin and about 40 kilometres (25 mi) northwest of Alessandria.
