= Montiglio Monferrato =

- Comune
- Comune di Montiglio Monferrato
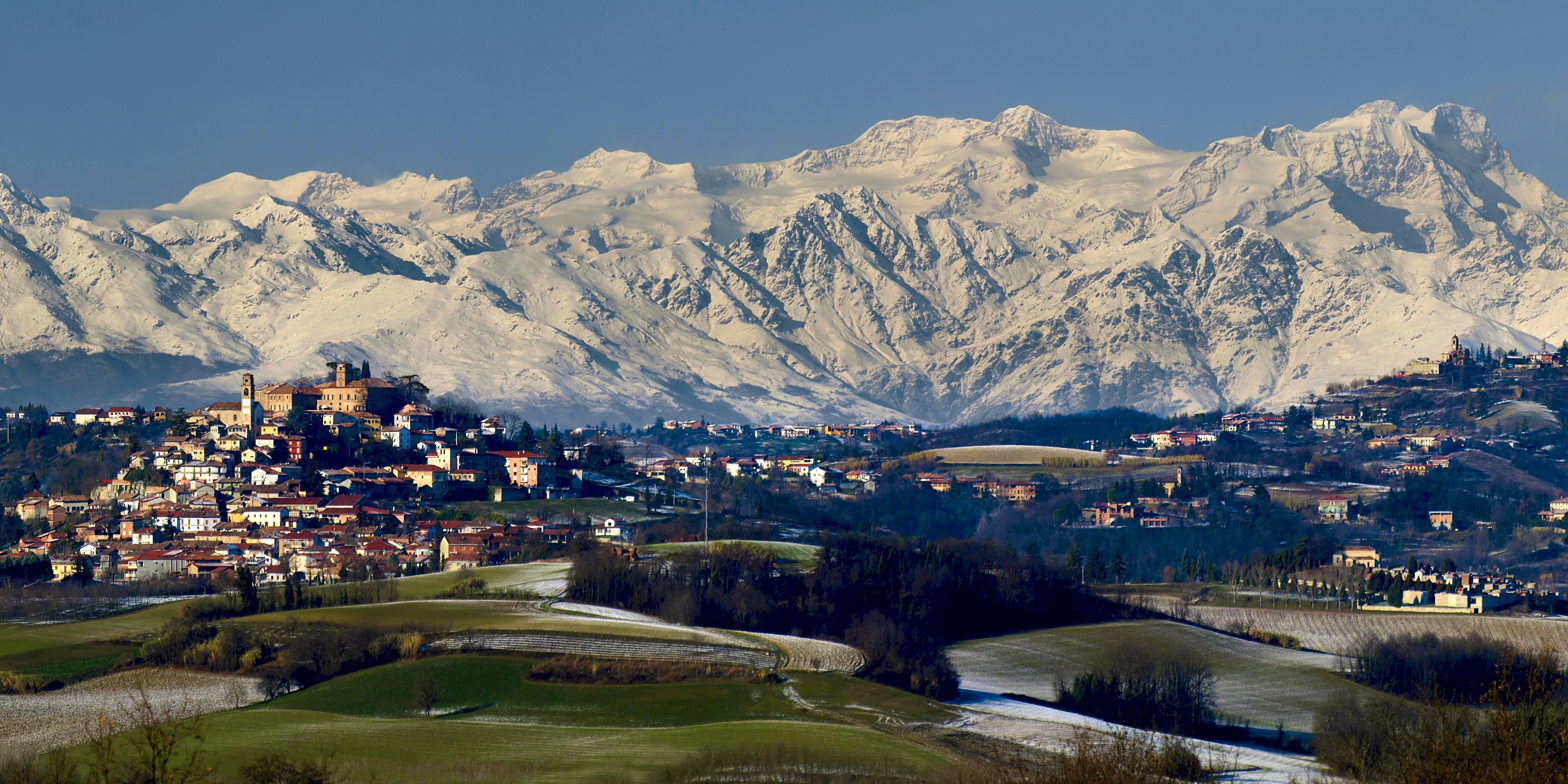
- Panorama of Montiglio Monferrato with the Montiglio Monferrato Castle

- Coat of arms

- Location within Italy Location within Piedmont
- Coordinates: 45°4′N 8°6′E
- Country: Italy
- Region: Piedmont
- Province: Asti (AT)

Government
  - Mayor: Dimitri Tasso

Area
  - Total: 27.0 km^{2} (10.4 sq mi)
- Elevation: 321 m (1,053 ft)

Population (31 December 2010)
  - Total: 1,689
  - Density: 62.6/km^{2} (162/sq mi)
- Demonym: Montigliesi
- Time zone: UTC+1 (CET)
  - Summer (DST): UTC+2 (CEST)
- Postal code: 14026
- Dialing code: 0141
- Website: Official website

Montiglio Monferrato is a comune in the Province of Asti in the Italian region Piedmont, located in the Valle Versa about 30 kilometres (19 mi) east of Turin and about 20 kilometres (12 mi) northwest of Asti. It was created in 1998 by combining the three communes of Colcavagno, Montiglio and Scandeluzza. The fourth principal population centre is the village of Rinco; this also was a commune in its own right until 1916 when it was absorbed by Scandeluzza.

== Main sights ==
Montiglio is home to Montiglio Monferrato Castle from the 13th century during the war between the commune of Asti and the marquises of Montferrat, destroyed in 1305 and rebuilt with tunnels in the 14th century. The castle's park houses the Chapel of St. Andrew, with the largest cycle of 14th-century frescoes in Piedmont.

Other castles are at Colcavagno and Rinco.

The 18th-century town church in via Roma features frescoes by Pietro Ivaldi. The 17th-century church of San Rocco is found in Piazza Umberto. Piazza Umberto also has a market on Friday.
