= Moransengo-Tonengo =

- Comune
- Comune di Moransengo-Tonengo
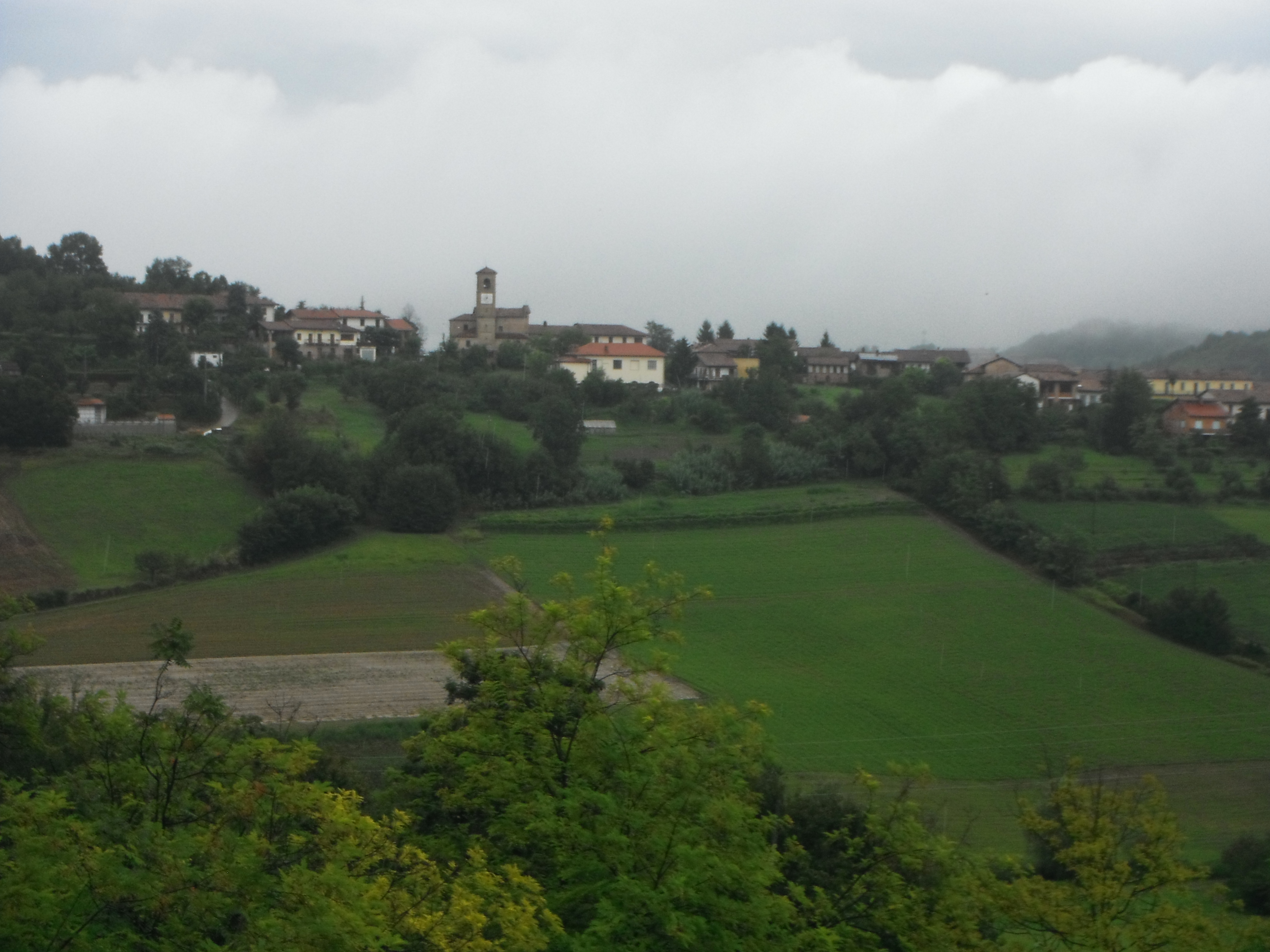
- View of Moransengo-Tonengo

- Location within Italy Location within Piedmont
- Coordinates: 45°07′02.06″N 8°00′09″E
- Country: Italy
- Region: Piedmont
- Province: Asti (AT)

Area
  - Total: 11 km^{2} (4.2 sq mi)
- Elevation: 430 m (1,410 ft)

Population (30 September 2022)
  - Total: 404
  - Density: 37/km^{2} (95/sq mi)
- Demonym: Moransenghesi
- Time zone: UTC+1 (CET)
  - Summer (DST): UTC+2 (CEST)
- Postal code: 14023
- Dialing code: 0141

Moransengo-Tonengo is a comune (municipality) in the Province of Asti in the Italian region Piedmont, located at about 430 meters above sea level on the Monferrato hills. It was established on 1 January 2023 with the merger of Moransengo and Tonengo. The seat of the municipality is in Tonengo.

Moransengo-Tonengo borders the following municipalities: Brozolo, Brusasco, Cavagnolo, and Cocconato.
