= Monteu da Po Castle =

Castle in Piedmont, Italy

- Castello di Monteu da Po
- Monteu da Po, Piedmont, Italy

Site information
- Type: Castle

Location
- Coordinates: 45°8′56.43″N 8°0′34.63″E

Monteu da Po Castle (Italian: Castello di Monteu da Po) is a castle located in Monteu da Po, Piedmont, Italy.

== History ==
The castle does not appear to have been built before the year 1000, as an imperial document from 996 granted the "Plebem Monticuli" to the Canons of Vercelli without mentioning any fortification, suggesting that the castle had not yet been constructed. However, its existence is documented in 1186 when Frederick Barbarossa, through a decree issued on March 5, granted Ottobono, Count Radicati, the investiture of various lands, villages, and castles, including Monteacuto, now known as Monteu da Po. The feudal history of the castle is recorded in the register of Piedmontese fiefs. Initially, Monte Acuto was part of the "County of Monferrato" before coming under the control of the lords of Brozzolo. On April 16, 1300, Giovanni, Marquis of Monferrato, acquired a portion of it and granted it in fief to Antonio, Count of Biandrate, on May 17, 1304. In 1306, ownership passed to the Paleologi, who later returned it to the Biandrate family. The history of the castle's ownership continued through numerous transfers up to the present day.

== Description ==
The castle are located on the highest hill in the area, offering a commanding view of the valley that includes Lauriano, Monteu da Po, Brusasco, and Cavagnolo. This strategic position also provides control over the section of the Po River that runs through these territories. Today, the remains of two square-shaped towers are still visible. The oldest tower is built entirely of bricks, with sandstone blocks interspersed at the foundations. It was accessed via a removable staircase through an arched doorway located five meters above the ground.
