= Francesco Maria Ferrero di Lavriano =

Francesco Maria Ferrero di Lavriano [or Lauriano] (1655–1730) was a Piedmontese official, Benedictine abbot, artist and historian. He was born at Turin, the son of Giovanni, count of Lavriano, and Anna Maria Re.

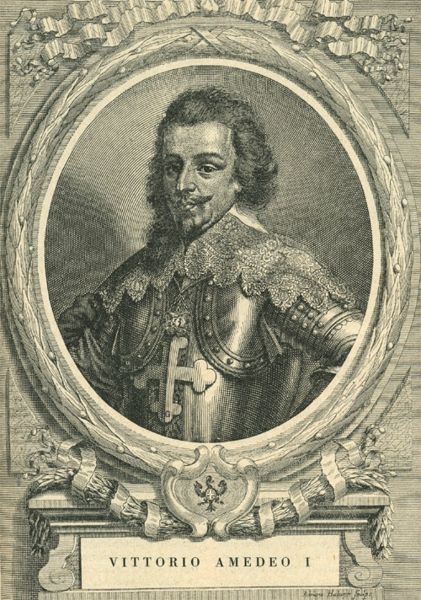
Ferrero di Lavriano's portrait of his contemporary, Victor Amadeus II.

In 1702, he published a collection of fine etchings of the rulers of Savoy, the Augustae regiaeque Sabaudae domus Arbor gentilitia regiae celsitudini Victori Amedeo II (Note: "Family Tree of the August and Royal House of Savoy of His Royal Highness Victor Amadeus II") in Turin.

On 3 June 1707, he was appointed royal bursar of the provinces of Alessandria, Lomellina, Valle di Sesia and Valenza, charged with administering vacant benefices. This was a new office at the time, and Ferrero was the first such officer appointed. On 8 June, Duke Victor Amadeus II sent Cardinal Vincenzo Grimani to Rome to obtain for Ferrero from Pope Clement XI the right to collect the revenues otherwise owed to the Apostolic Camera from vacant ecclesiastical benefices in the same provinces. Grimani delayed his departure, however, and Ferrero assumed the revenues without official authorization, thus prompting a dispute with the bishop of Novara. The matter was not finally cleared up until November 1712.

He composed two detailed volumes on his work as a royal bursar, both now in the Royal Library of Turin: Memorie concernenti l'Economato regio, ricavate dagli Archivi del Senato e dai registri della Cancelleria dell'Economato di Milano (Note: "Memorials Relating to the Royal Bursary, obtained from the Archives of the Senate and from the Records of the Chancery of the Bursary of Milan") and Istoria dell'Economato regio o sia Relazione distinta di tutti i successi seguiti pendente l'amministrazione di quest'officio dal 1707 al 1718 inclusivamente. (Note: "History of the Royal Bursary, or a Distinct Report of all the Events that Occurred during the Administration of This Official from 1707 until 1718 inclusive") He was a copious collector of documents relating to ecclesiastical benefices: imperial diplomas, papal concessions, nuptial agreements, treaties, most of which found their way into the Royal Library of Turin.

In 1712, he published at Turin the Istoria dell'augusta città di Torino, (Note: "History of the August City of Turin") which was a continuation of the history of Turin written by Emanuele Tesauro (died 1675). A copy was presented to Victor Amadeus by city leaders in 1713 to mark the signing of the Treaty of Utrecht, the favourable ending of the War of the Spanish Succession—especially the siege of Turin in 1706—and Victor Amadeus' acquisition of a royal crown, that of Sicily.

In 1717 he took over the provostship of Moncenisio. He renounced it in 1727 and became titular abbot of Santo Stefano in Ivrea in 1728. (Note: The 11th-century bell tower of Santo Stefano is a landmark of Ivrea.) In 1718, he had helped the abbot of Santo Stefano, T. A. De Rossi, in settling a dispute with the Noble Consortium of the Fief of Passerano (Note: Consortile nobiliare del feudo di Passerano) over the right to perform religious services.

On 15 November 1720, Victor Amadeus nominated him one of the reformers of the University of Turin, praising him for his prudence and skill. Some of his ideas on reform can be found in the letter he wrote to the secretary of state G. L. Raiberti dated 21 July 1721.

In 1722, he published Gli elementi della lingua toscana (Note: "The Elements of the Tuscan Language") in Cologne, Germany.

He died at Turin between 20 and 28 February 1730.
