= Brusasco Castle =

Castle in Piedmont, Italy

- Castello di Brusasco
- Brusasco, Piedmont, Italy

Site information
- Type: Castle

Location
- Coordinates: 45°08′58.98″N 8°03′43.98″E

Brusasco Castle (Italian: Castello di Brusasco) is a castle located in Brusasco, Piedmont, Italy.

== History ==
The first nucleus of the castle was built by order of Berengar II of Italy. Some first documented mention of the building dates to September 22, 1446, when it was granted as a fief to the brothers Bonifacio, Bertolino, and Giorgio of the Counts of Valperga, who owned it until 1504. Among the later owners, Claudio Cesare Dodolo of Chieri stands out for his quarrelsome nature and for choosing to live in the parish church due to the castle's poor condition.

In 1722, the castle passed to the Cotti family, who initiated its renovation under the direction of architect Giovanni Maria Molino. Later, in 1780, Count Luigi Cotti redesigned the park in the English style, incorporating medieval ruins and adding a faux Roman nymphaeum. After several ownership changes, in 1874, it was acquired by Count Gazzelli Brucco of Ceresole, who added a neo-medieval tower with an adjoining chapel. From 1970, following a long period under the Marianist Fathers and years of neglect, the castle was purchased by the Violi family, who transformed it into an agriturismo.

== Description ==
The castle is located in the hilltop village of Luogo within the comune of Brusasco.
