= Clemente Marchisio =

Italian Roman Catholic priest

Blessed Clemente Marchisio

Priest
- Born: 1 March 1833; Racconigi, Cuneo, Kingdom of Sardinia
- Died: 16 December 1903 (aged 70); Rivalba, Turin, Kingdom of Italy
- Venerated in: Roman Catholic Church
- Beatified: 30 September 1984, Saint Peter's Square, Vatican City by Pope John Paul II
- Feast: 16 December
- Attributes: Sun; Stole; Cassock
- Patronage: Daughters of Saint Joseph of Rivalba

Clemente Marchisio (1 March 1833 – 16 December 1903) was an Italian Roman Catholic priest who served as a parish priest in the Archdiocese of Turin. Marchisio served as an assistant priest before travelling across Italian cities as word of his mission and holiness spread. In the spirit of evangelical and devotional zeal he established the Daughters of Saint Joseph of Rivalba to suit the religious needs of females. The order had an emphasis on the Eucharist and on Saint Joseph himself.

On 30 September 1984, he was beatified after one healing was recognized as a miracle attributed to his intercession.

== Life ==
Clemente Marchisio was born on 1 March 1833 in Cuneo as the first of five children to a shoemaker. As a child he lived near a Dominican-run church and attended Mass there on a frequent basis; he also harbored a great devotion to the Blessed Mother as well as the rosary.

While he was going to follow his father in the latter's profession Marchisio received a sudden call to the priesthood and announced as such to his surprised parents; despite this surprise his parents did not oppose their son's wish. Giovanni Battista Sacco aided him in his studies and formation for the priesthood and also rendered economic assistance.

Marchisio was ordained to the priesthood on 20 September 1856 from the Bishop of Susa Giovanni Antonio Oddone since the Archbishop of Turin was in exile in France; he required a special dispensation to be ordained since he had not reached the canonical age limit for it. After he was ordained he went for further studies in a boarding school for priests named in honour of Francis of Assisi. He was named as an assistant priest in 1858.

His schedule consisted of waking up at 5:00am and spending two hours in reflection prior to the celebration of Mass. He would then recite two rosaries: one in the morning and one in the evening before he went to sleep. Marchisio said of the Eucharist - to which he had an ardent devotion to - that "I also find sometimes associated under the weight of tribulations, but I assure you that, after five minutes with a living faith before Jesus Sacrament, I feel fully revived, so that all that first seemed too hard and became unbearably light and easy". He also underwent a visit to Lourdes in 1875 for spiritual reflection.

The departure of the Albertine nuns left a void of female religious congregations in Turin and its Archbishop Lorenzo Gastaldi encouraged him to create a new order for women. In 1871 in Rivalba he had opened a weaving workshop for girls as jobs and used that as the basis for his new congregation. He established it on a formal level on 12 November 1877 and had with him Rosalia Sismonda - a recruit - at his right side in managing it. The order was dedicated to the Eucharist and to Saint Joseph. In 1883 the order opened a house in Rome and Pope Leo XIII said of it in praise: "At last, our Lord!" The pontiff also referred to its members as the "Sisters of the Host".

Marchisio's pastoral mission became so intense that he travelled across various Italian cities and received certificates from heads of dioceses and archdioceses alike in recognition of his good works - one such one came from the Cardinal Patriarch of Venice Giuseppe Melchiorre Sarto who would become Pope Pius X. The order would receive the diocesan approval of the Turin Archbishop Gastaldi on 3 May 1877 and received a papal decree of praise of Leo XIII on 6 August 1901.

His health started to decline due to his intense schedule and he would celebrate his final Mass on 14 December 1903. He died on the following 16 December uttering the names of the Holy Family.

=== Legacy ===
Pope Pius X - whom Marchisio had met in Venice - recognized the congregation as one of pontifical right on 9 July 1908.

The congregation now operates in Nigeria and Brazil amongst other nations and as of 2005 has 322 professed religious into the order in a total of 30 houses.

== Beatification ==
The process for beatification commenced in Turin with two processes that saw the collation of both witness testimonies and documentation pertaining to his life and his pastoral life. Those processes spanned from 1933 until 1935 and another from 1946 until 1947. Marchisio's spiritual writings were approved by theologians on 22 November 1939, and on 28 April 1944 Pope Pius XII and the Congregation of Rites formally opened the cause and granted Marchisio the title of Servant of God.

Both processes were declared valid and were ratified in order for the boxes of documents to be taken to Rome for further investigation and allowed - after extensive research and consideration - for Pope Paul VI to declare Marchisio on 4 May 1970 to be Venerable.

Pope John Paul II - in the beginning of 1984 - signed a decree recognizing a healing as a miracle and allowed for the beatification of Marchisio to take place; he was beatified on 30 September 1984.
