= Casalborgone =

- Comune
- Comune di Casalborgone
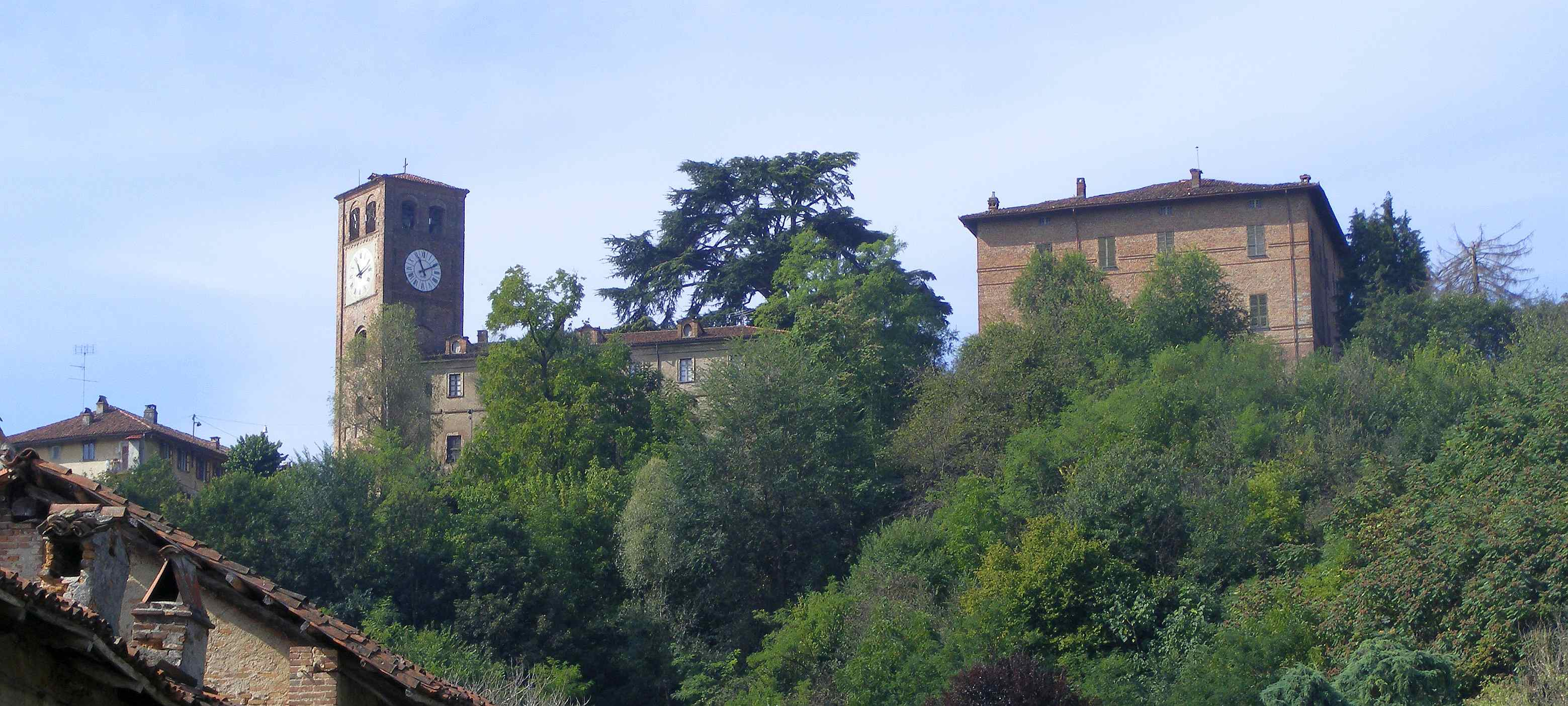

- Coat of arms

- Location within Italy Location within Piedmont
- Coordinates: 45°8′N 7°56′E
- Country: Italy
- Region: Piedmont
- Metropolitan city: Turin (TO)
- Frazioni: Ceriaglio, Borganino, Val Chiapini, Val Frascherina

Government
  - Mayor: Francesco Cavallero

Area
  - Total: 20.13 km^{2} (7.77 sq mi)
- Elevation: 205 m (673 ft)

Population (1-1-2017)
  - Total: 1,920
  - Density: 95.4/km^{2} (247/sq mi)
- Demonym: Casalborgonese(i)
- Time zone: UTC+1 (CET)
  - Summer (DST): UTC+2 (CEST)
- Postal code: 10020
- Dialing code: 011
- Website: Official website

Casalborgone is a comune (municipality) in the Metropolitan City of Turin in the Italian region Piedmont, located about 20 kilometres (12 mi) northeast of Turin.

Casalborgone borders the following municipalities: San Sebastiano da Po, Lauriano, Castagneto Po, Rivalba, Tonengo, Aramengo, Berzano di San Pietro, and Cinzano.
