= Castagneto Po =

- Comune
- Comune di Castagneto Po
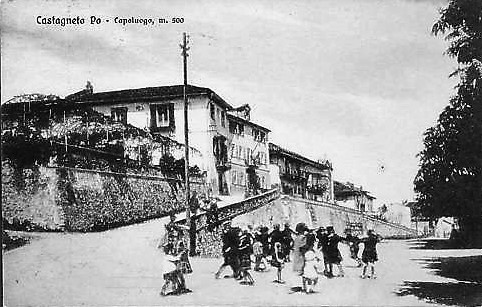

- Coat of arms

- Location within Italy Location within Piedmont
- Coordinates: 45°11′N 7°53′E
- Country: Italy
- Region: Piedmont
- Metropolitan city: Turin (TO)
- Frazioni: Alberti, Baraccone, Cimenasco, Coste, Galleani, Giaccona, Negri, Ossole, Pezzana, Poggio, Ricca, San Genesio, Serre, Tamagni, Villanova, Vogliotti

Government
  - Mayor: Giorgio Bertotto

Area
  - Total: 11.47 km^{2} (4.43 sq mi)
- Elevation: 473 m (1,552 ft)

Population (1-1-2017)
  - Total: 1,801
  - Density: 157.0/km^{2} (406.7/sq mi)
- Demonym: Castagnetese(i)
- Time zone: UTC+1 (CET)
  - Summer (DST): UTC+2 (CEST)
- Postal code: 10090
- Dialing code: 011
- Website: Official website

Castagneto Po is a comune (municipality) in the Metropolitan City of Turin in the Italian region Piedmont, located about 20 kilometres (12 mi) northeast of Turin.

Castagneto Po borders the following municipalities: Chivasso, San Sebastiano da Po, San Raffaele Cimena, Casalborgone, and Rivalba.

Main sights include Castagneto Po Castle.
