= Castagneto Po Castle =

Castle in Piedmont, Italy

- Castello di Castagneto Po
- Castagneto Po, Piedmont, Italy

Site information
- Type: Castle

Location
- Coordinates: 45°10′33.25″N 7°53′32.07″E

Castagneto Po Castle (Italian: Castello di Castagneto Po), also known as Villa Ceriana, is a castle located in Castagneto Po, Piedmont, Italy.

== History ==
The existence of the castle has been documented since the 11th century when, in 1019, Otto William, son of Marquess Adalbert II of Italy, donated it to the monks of Fruttuaria Abbey, along with part of the surrounding territories, effectively making it an indirect possession of the Bishop of Ivrea. In 1227, the fief passed to the Marquesses of Montferrat, who received it as a grant along with the territories of Casalborgone and Chivasso. However, from the same century, control of the area came under the rule of the Princes of Achaia, leading to conflicts with the Marquesses of Montferrat. In 1397, the troops of the condottiero Facino Cane set fire to the castle and the entire settlement.

Rebuilt after the devastation, the manor first became a fief of the Roero family of Asti, then passed to the Socci and later to the Provana. In 1620, Charles Emmanuel I, Duke of Savoy granted the fief to General Giovanni Antonio Trabucco, a high-ranking official of the Savoyard state. Between the 16th and 18th centuries, Castagneto Po was repeatedly raided by the French, as it was an integral part of the defensive system protecting Turin from the east. During the War of the Spanish Succession, in 1705, the castle once again suffered extensive destruction at the hands of the troops of General Louis François de la Feuillade, sharing the same fate as the nearby Rocca di Verrua.

The castle was rebuilt on the ruins of the ancient fortress by counts Trabucco in 1870, based on designs by the architect Filippo Giovanni Battista Nicolis of Robilant. The project was completed in 1835 thanks to the intervention of Ernesto Melano, an architect of the Savoy court. In 1859, the property passed to counts Ceriana, who initiated various embellishments. Arturo Ceriana enriched the building with a gallery decorated in Renaissance style, adorned with marble and sculpted stones. Some interior decoration work was carried out by renowned artists such as Francesco Gonin and Costantino Sereno.

In the following decades, the castle belonged to counts Fé d'Ostiani until it was purchased in 1952 by the entrepreneur and composer Alberto Bruni Tedeschi. Under his ownership, the building underwent extensive restoration. Upon his death in 1996, the castle passed to his wife, Marisa Borini, and their children, Virginio, Valeria, and Carla Bruni Tedeschi, a supermodel and First Lady of France as the wife of French President Nicolas Sarkozy. Subsequently, a significant portion of the mansion's furniture and artworks was auctioned to fund a foundation in memory of Virginio Bruni Tedeschi.

In 2009, the property was sold for €17.5 million to Saudi Prince Al Waleed bin Talal Al Saud through the Alwaleed Philanthropies foundation. Ten years later, in 2018, the organization donated the castle to the Italian Red Cross.
