= Lauriano =

- Comune
- Comune di Lauriano
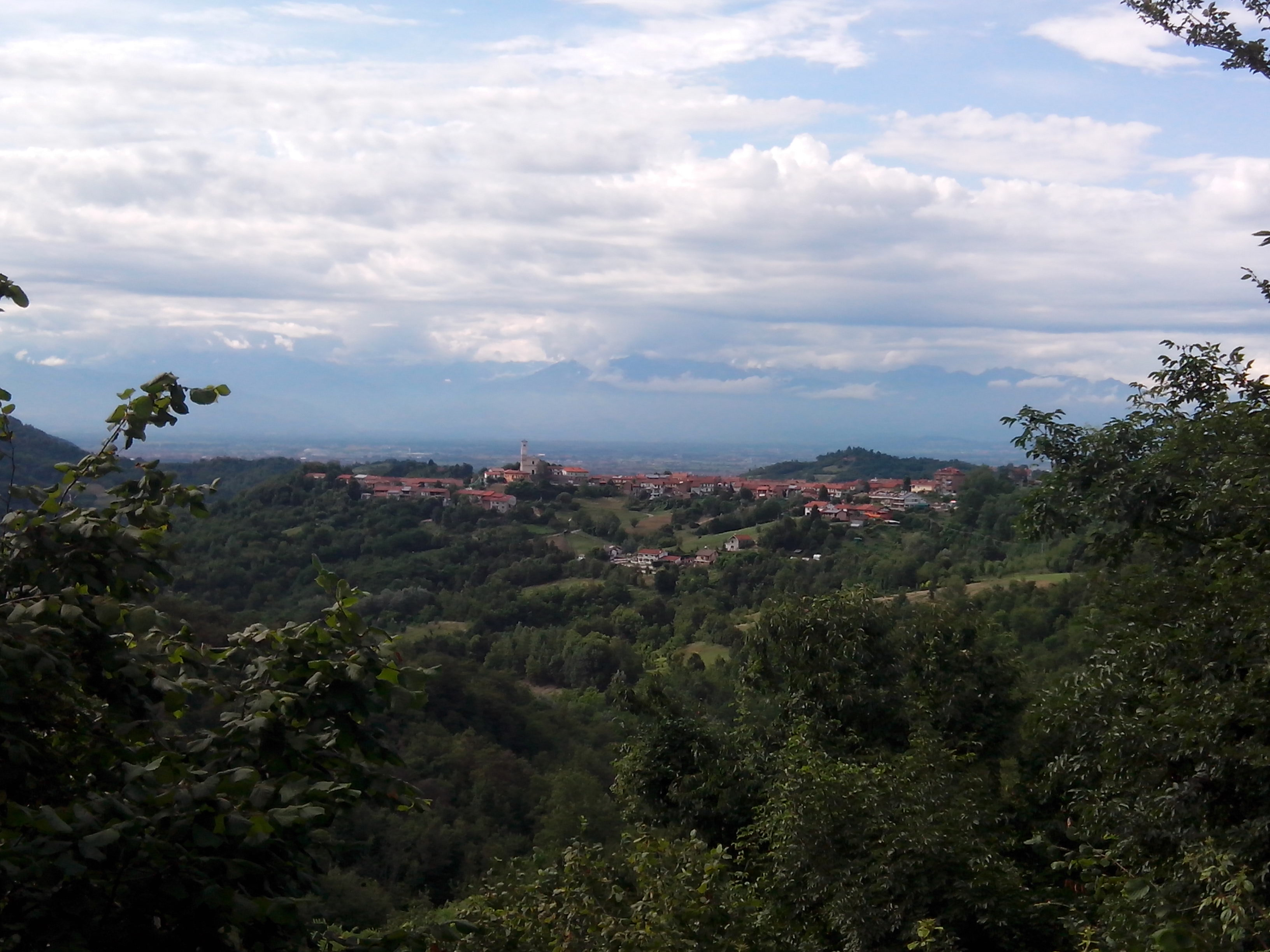

- Location within Italy Location within Piedmont
- Coordinates: 45°10′N 8°0′E
- Country: Italy
- Region: Piedmont
- Metropolitan city: Turin (TO)

Government
  - Mayor: Mara Baccolla

Area
  - Total: 14.2 km^{2} (5.5 sq mi)
- Elevation: 175 m (574 ft)

Population (31 December 2010)
  - Total: 1,546
  - Density: 109/km^{2} (282/sq mi)
- Demonym: Laurianesi
- Time zone: UTC+1 (CET)
  - Summer (DST): UTC+2 (CEST)
- Postal code: 10020
- Dialing code: 011
- Website: Official website

Lauriano is a comune (municipality) in the Metropolitan City of Turin in the Italian region Piedmont, about 25 kilometres (16 mi) northeast of Turin.

Lauriano borders the following municipalities: Verolengo, Monteu da Po, San Sebastiano da Po, Cavagnolo, Casalborgone, and Tonengo.
