= Cerreto d'Asti =

- Comune
- Comune di Cerreto d'Asti
- Location within Italy Location within Piedmont
- Coordinates: 45°3′N 8°2′E
- Country: Italy
- Region: Piedmont
- Province: Asti (AT)

Government
  - Mayor: Mario Angelo Saini

Area
  - Total: 4.0 km^{2} (1.5 sq mi)
- Elevation: 280 m (920 ft)

Population (31 December 2010)
  - Total: 216
  - Density: 54/km^{2} (140/sq mi)
- Demonym: Cerretesi
- Time zone: UTC+1 (CET)
  - Summer (DST): UTC+2 (CEST)
- Postal code: 14020
- Dialing code: 0141

Cerreto d'Asti is a comune (municipality) in the Province of Asti in the Italian region Piedmont, located about 25 kilometres (16 mi) east of Turin and about 20 kilometres (12 mi) northwest of Asti.

Cerreto d'Asti borders the following municipalities: Capriglio, Passerano Marmorito, and Piovà Massaia.
