= Aramengo =

- Comune
- Comune di Aramengo
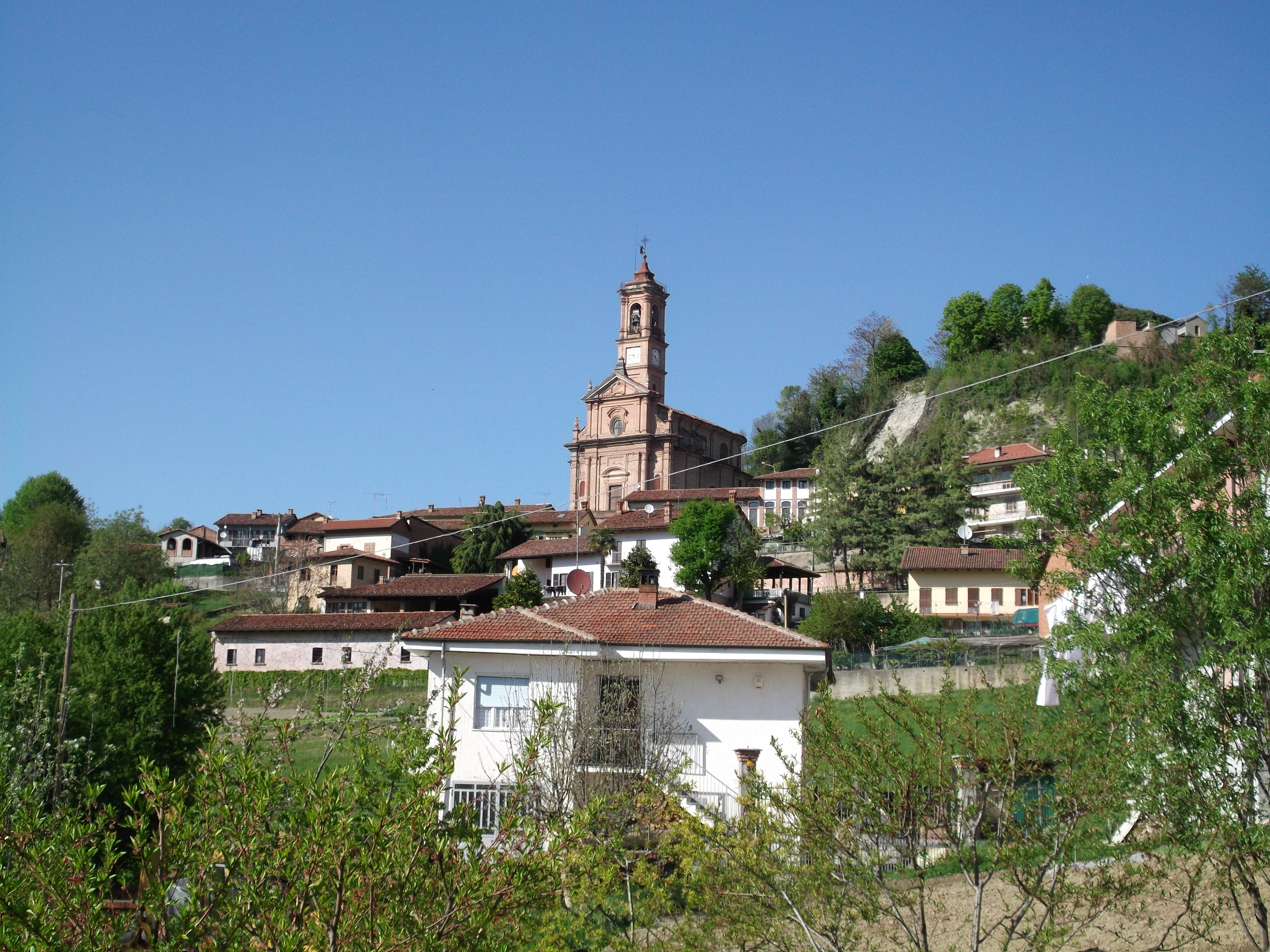
- View of Aramengo

- Coat of arms

- Location of Aramengo in Italy Aramengo (Piedmont)
- Coordinates: 45°6′N 8°0′E
- Country: Italy
- Region: Piedmont
- Province: Asti (AT)

Government
  - Mayor: Cristiano Massaia

Area
  - Total: 11.4 km^{2} (4.4 sq mi)
- Elevation: 357 m (1,171 ft)

Population (31 December 2011)
  - Total: 632
  - Density: 55.4/km^{2} (144/sq mi)
- Demonym: Aramenghesi
- Time zone: UTC+1 (CET)
  - Summer (DST): UTC+2 (CEST)
- Postal code: 14020
- Dialing code: 0141

Aramengo is a comune (municipality) in the Province of Asti in the Italian region Piedmont, located about 25 kilometres (16 mi) east of Turin and about 25 kilometres (16 mi) northwest of Asti.

Aramengo borders the following municipalities: Albugnano, Berzano di San Pietro, Casalborgone, Cocconato, Passerano Marmorito, and Tonengo.
