= San Raffaele Cimena =

- Comune
- Comune di San Raffaele Cimena
- Coat of arms

- Location within Italy Location within Piedmont
- Coordinates: 45°9′N 7°51′E
- Country: Italy
- Region: Piedmont
- Metropolitan city: Turin (TO)
- Frazioni: Piana, San Raffaele Alto, Cimena

Government
  - Mayor: Ettore Mantelli

Area
  - Total: 11.2 km^{2} (4.3 sq mi)
- Elevation: 195 m (640 ft)

Population (31 September 2018)
  - Total: 3,124
  - Density: 279/km^{2} (722/sq mi)
- Demonym: Sanraffaelesi
- Time zone: UTC+1 (CET)
  - Summer (DST): UTC+2 (CEST)
- Postal code: 10090
- Dialing code: 011
- Website: Official website

San Raffaele Cimena is a comune (municipality) in the Metropolitan City of Turin in the Italian region Piedmont, located about 15 kilometres (9 mi) northeast of Turin.

San Raffaele Cimena borders the following municipalities: Chivasso, Brandizzo, Castagneto Po, Settimo Torinese, Gassino Torinese, and Rivalba.
