= Cinzano Castle =

Castle in Piedmont, Italy

- Castello di Cinzano
- Cinzano, Piedmont, Italy
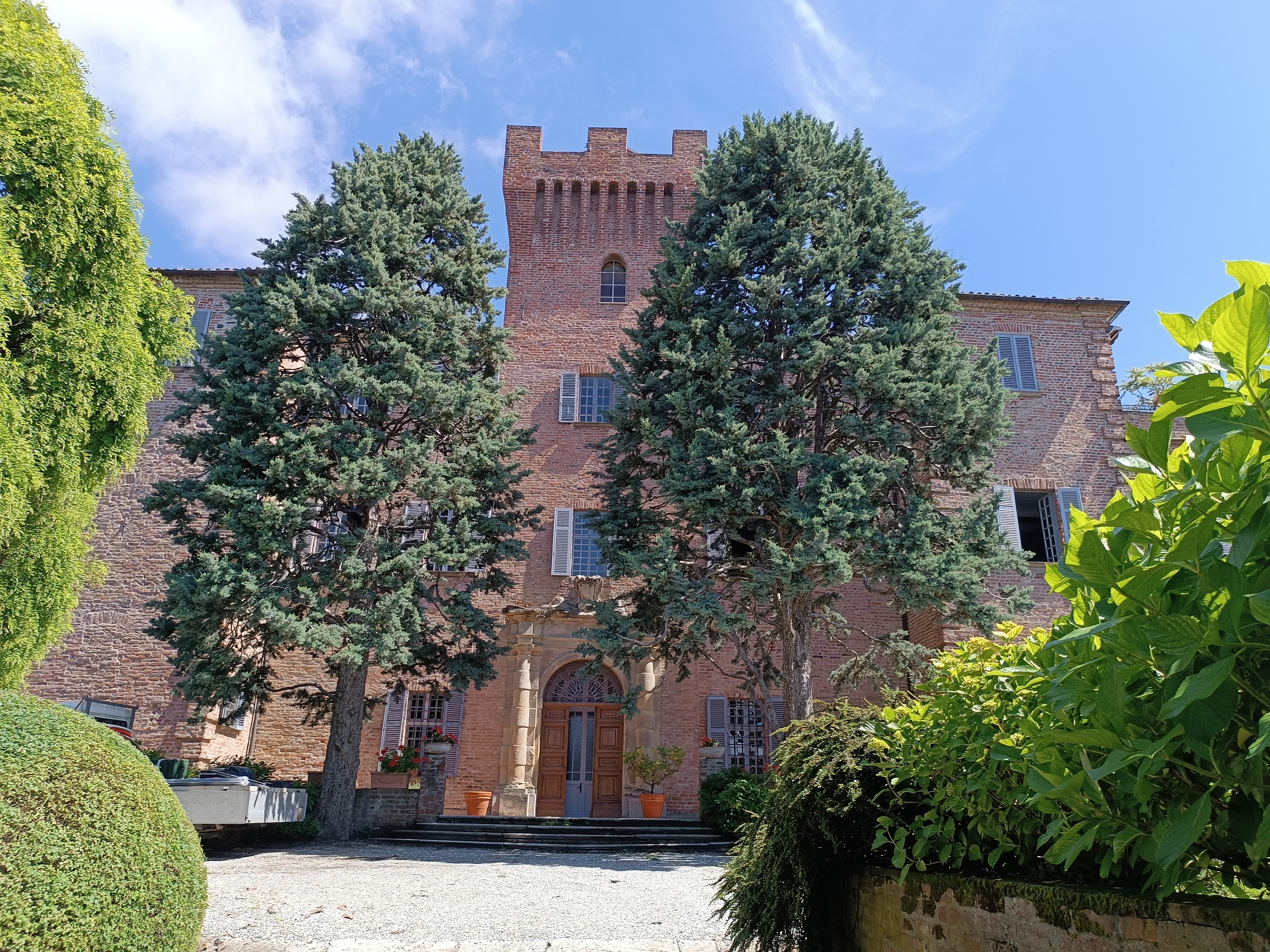
- Cinzano Castle in 2024

Site information
- Type: Castle

Location
- Coordinates: 45°5′44.21″N 7°55′30.31″E

Cinzano Castle (Italian: Castello di Cinzano) is a castle located in Cinzano, Piedmont, Italy.

== History ==
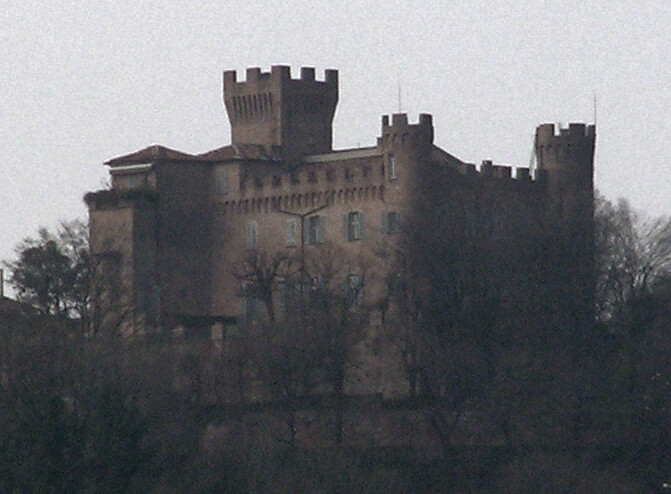

The castle was originally built around a large square tower in the 11th century, and it formed part of a medieval fortified settlement enclosed by walls.

In 1666, Marquis Carlo Renato Della Chiesa initiated major transformations, expanding the structure to turn it into a noble residence and demolishing the houses of the settlement to create gardens. In the 19th century, Marquis Ludovico Della Chiesa restored the castle in a neo-Gothic style, reinstating its fortified appearance with battlements and a new entrance. After World War II, the castle suffered damage and underwent multiple changes in use, serving as a restaurant, a medical-educational institute, and eventually being divided into apartments in 1968.
