= San Sebastiano da Po Castle =

Castle in Piedmont, Italy

- Castello di San Sebastiano da Po
- San Sebastiano da Po, Piedmont, Italy

Site information
- Type: Castle

Location
- Coordinates: 45°9′16.94″N 7°55′53.63″E

San Sebastiano da Po Castle (Italian: Castello di San Sebastiano da Po) is a castle located in San Sebastiano da Po, Piedmont, Italy.

== History ==
The origins of the castle date back to the 10th century, when the territory was part of the March of Montferrat. Early records indicate that the settlement of San Sebastiano was under the rule of the Radicati family. Over the centuries, the castle became involved in the conflicts for control over Piedmont, first between the House of Savoy and the Marquises of Montferrat, and later with the intervention of Spanish and French troops. A significant turning point occurred in 1761 when Count Paolo Federico Novarina, lord of San Sebastiano, commissioned architect Bernardo Antonio Vittone to renovate the entire complex, having previously admired his work on the nearby parish church. Vittone added Baroque and Neoclassical elements to the structure.

During the 19th century, the owners of the castle commissioned artistic and landscape interventions. The painter and architect Pietro Bagetti frescoed the interior gallery, while the German architect Xavier Kurten designed the park. The castle welcomed distinguished visitors over time, including Napoleon I, in whose honor a rare Ginkgo biloba tree was planted in 1810, still standing today.

== Description ==
The castle's Italian garden, featuring boxwood and rose parterres, once hosted over 3,000 species of plants and flowers. Today, a fruit orchard, reminiscent of medieval orchards, and a greenhouse next to a Neoclassical temple still remain.
