= Moransengo =

- Comune
- Comune di Moransengo
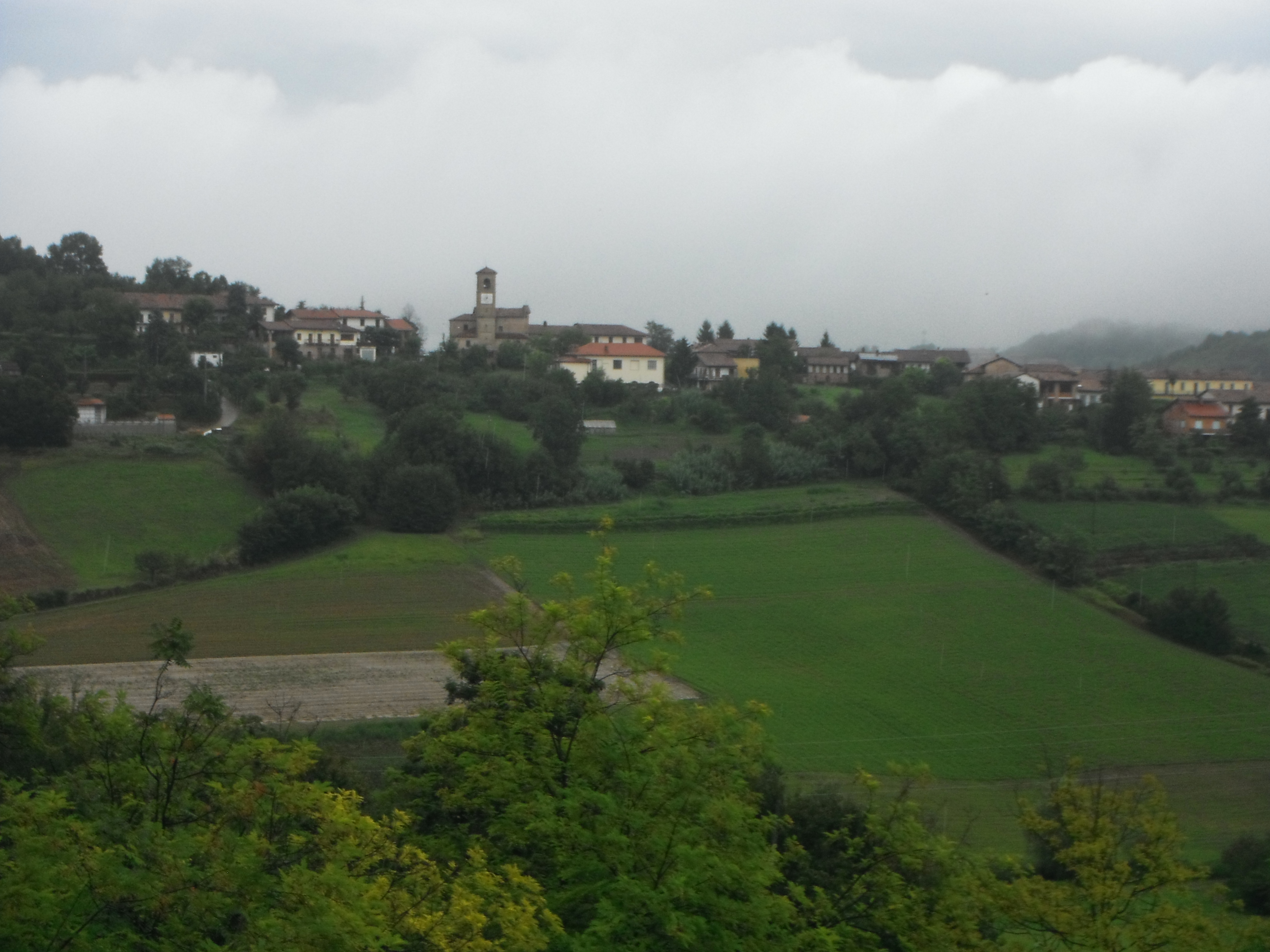
- View of Moransengo

- Coat of arms

- Location within Italy Location within Piedmont
- Coordinates: 45°7′N 8°2′E
- Country: Italy
- Region: Piedmont
- Province: Asti (AT)

Government
  - Mayor: Massimo Ghigo

Area
  - Total: 5.4 km^{2} (2.1 sq mi)
- Elevation: 400 m (1,300 ft)

Population (1 January 2014)
  - Total: 207
  - Density: 38/km^{2} (99/sq mi)
- Demonym: Moransenghesi
- Time zone: UTC+1 (CET)
  - Summer (DST): UTC+2 (CEST)
- Postal code: 14023
- Dialing code: 0141

Moransengo is a comune (municipality) in the Province of Asti in the Italian region Piedmont, located about 25 kilometres (16 mi) east of Turin and about 25 kilometres (16 mi) northwest of Asti.

Moransengo borders the following municipalities: Brozolo, Brusasco, Cavagnolo, Cocconato, and Tonengo.
