= Cavagnolo =

- Comune
- Comune di Cavagnolo
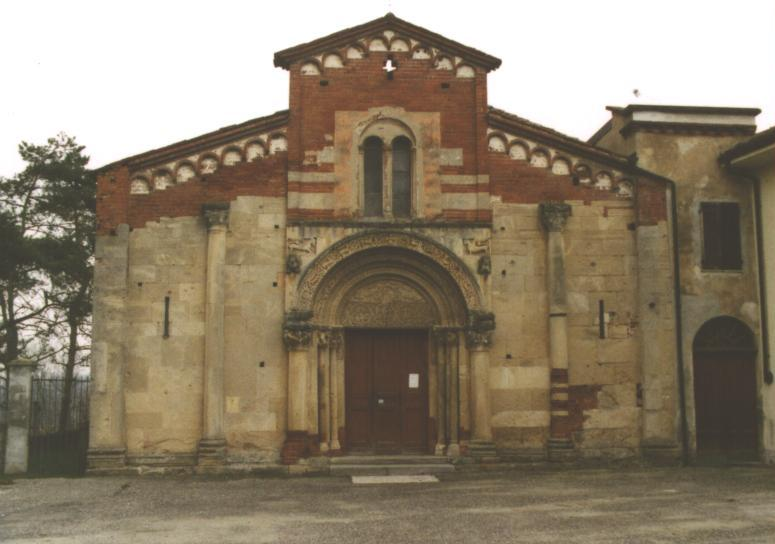
- Santa Fede Abbey

- Location within Italy Location within Piedmont
- Coordinates: 45°9′N 8°3′E
- Country: Italy
- Region: Piedmont
- Metropolitan city: Turin (TO)

Government
  - Mayor: Andrea Gavazza

Area
  - Total: 12.33 km^{2} (4.76 sq mi)

Population (1-1-2017)
  - Total: 2,179
  - Density: 176.7/km^{2} (457.7/sq mi)
- Demonym: Cavagnolese(i)
- Time zone: UTC+1 (CET)
  - Summer (DST): UTC+2 (CEST)
- Postal code: 10020
- Dialing code: 011
- Patron saint: Eusebius of Vercelli
- Saint day: 2 August

Cavagnolo is a comune (municipality) in the Metropolitan City of Turin in the Italian region Piedmont, about 30 kilometres (19 mi) northeast of Turin.

Cavagnolo borders the following municipalities: Brusasco, Monteu da Po, Lauriano, Moransengo, and Tonengo.

== Geography ==
The comune of Cavagnolo is situated in the northern Montferrat; its territory is mostly hilly.

== Main sights ==
The abbey of Santa Fede was founded by the Benedictine monks of Sainte-Foy-de-Conque (Alvernia-France) toward halves the 12th century. Besides the ruins of the castle, other sights include the Church of St. Secondo to the Cemetery, old parish church, the town hall and Villa Martini, residence on the hills of Cavagnolo.
