= Brozolo =

- Comune
- Comune di Brozolo
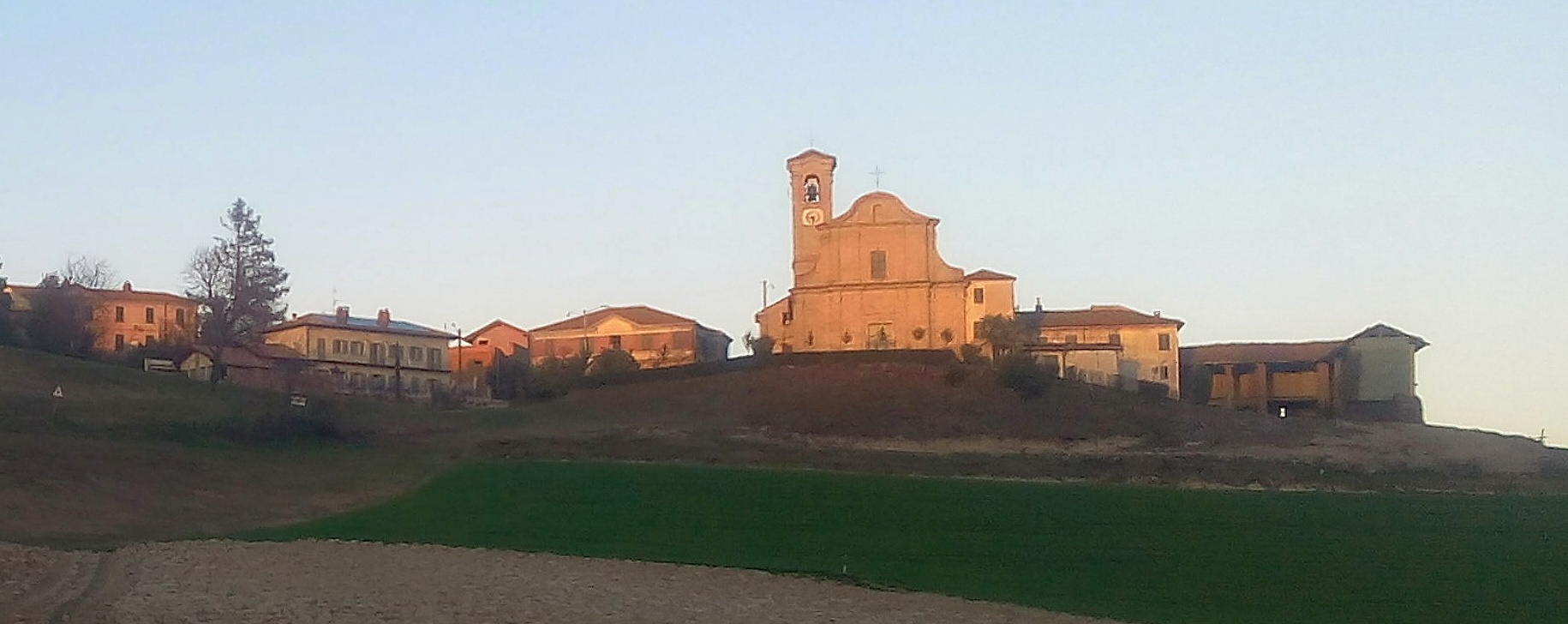

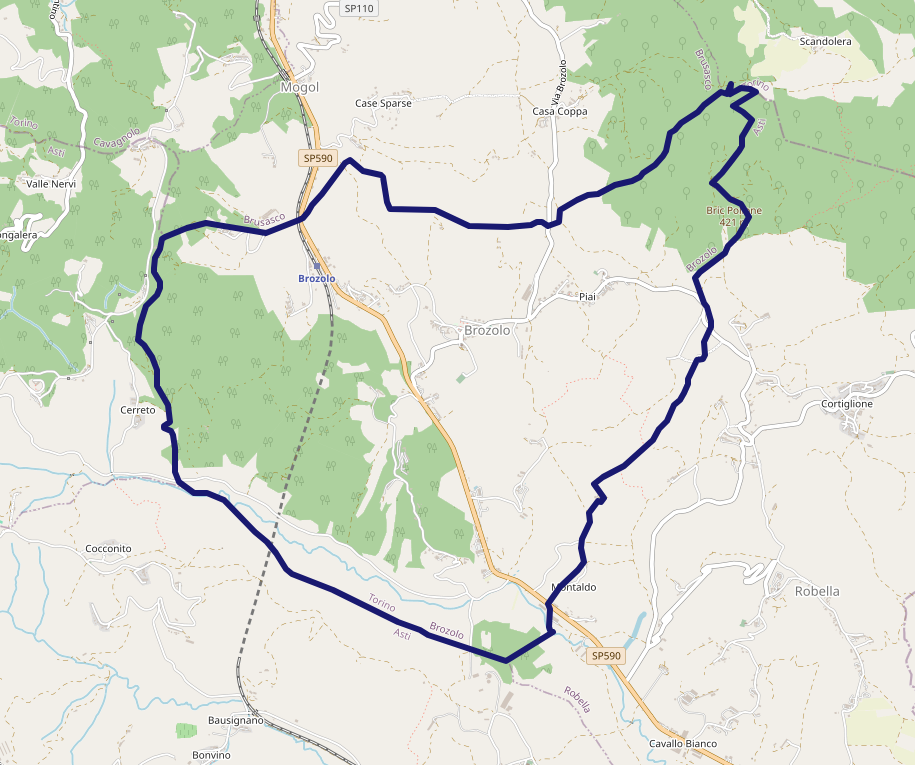

- Location within Italy Location within Piedmont
- Coordinates: 45°7′N 8°4′E
- Country: Italy
- Region: Piedmont
- Metropolitan city: Turin (TO)

Government
  - Mayor: Sergio Bongiovanni

Area
  - Total: 8.95 km^{2} (3.46 sq mi)
- Elevation: 408 m (1,339 ft)

Population (1-1-2017)
  - Total: 463
  - Density: 51.7/km^{2} (134/sq mi)
- Demonym: Brozolese(i)
- Time zone: UTC+1 (CET)
  - Summer (DST): UTC+2 (CEST)
- Postal code: 10020
- Dialing code: 011

Brozolo is a comune (municipality) in the Metropolitan City of Turin in the Italian region Piedmont, located about 30 kilometres (19 mi) east of Turin.

Brozolo borders the following municipalities: Verrua Savoia, Brusasco, Moransengo, Robella, and Cocconato.

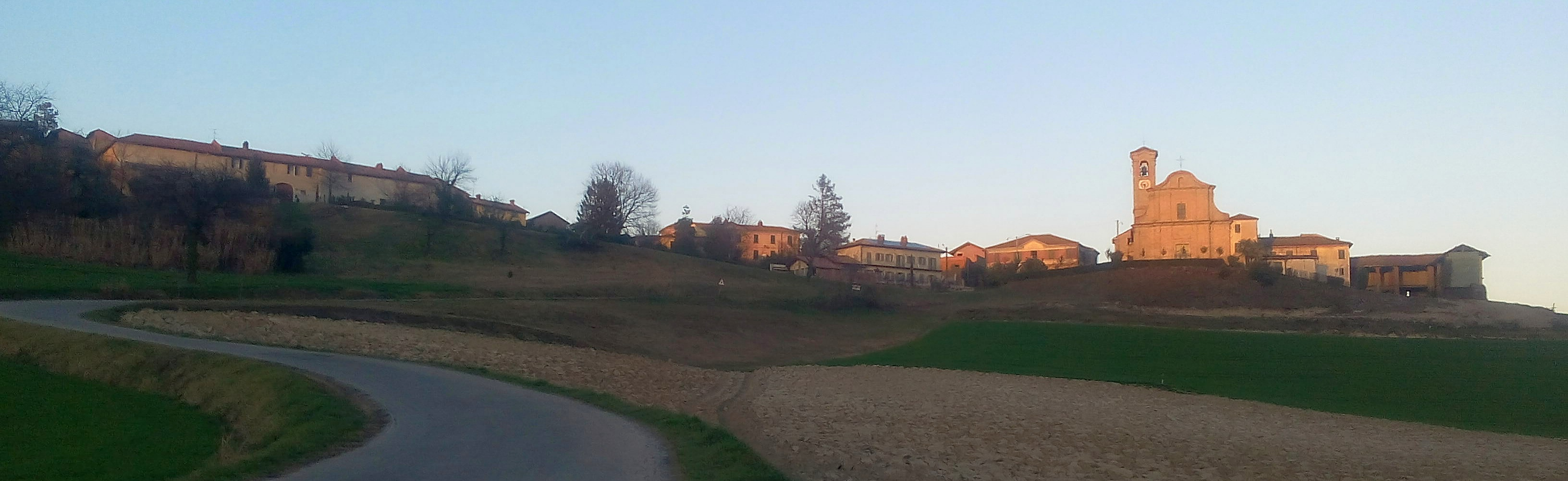
Brozolo
