= Passerano Marmorito =

- Comune
- Comune di Passerano Marmorito
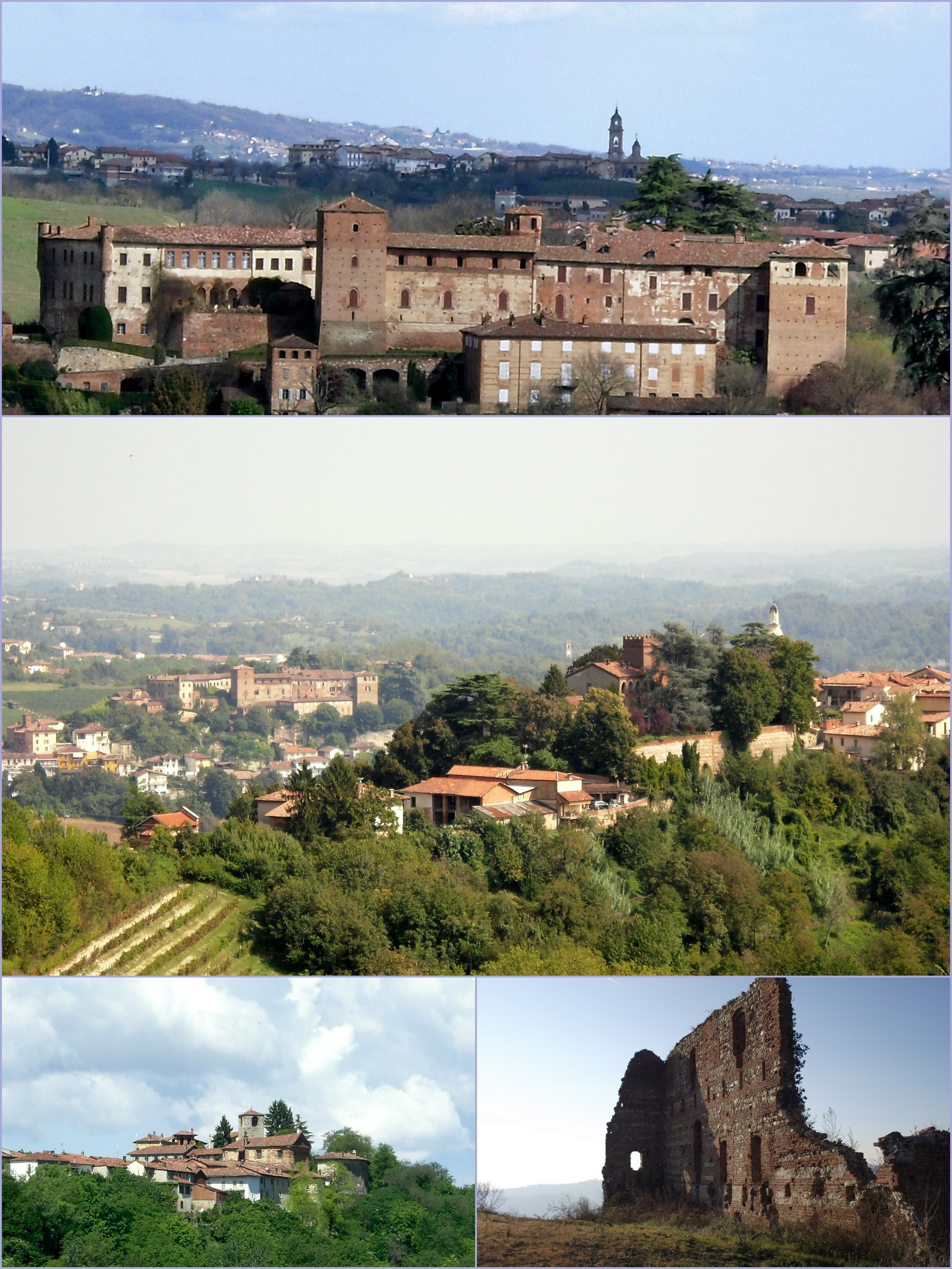
- From above: Medieval Castle; the borough and castle of Primeglio with Passerano in the background; Schierano (lower left) and (right) remains of the castle of Marmorito.

- Location within Italy Location within Piedmont
- Coordinates: 45°3′N 8°1′E
- Country: Italy
- Region: Piedmont
- Province: Asti (AT)
- Frazioni: Primeglio, Schierano, Marmorito, Rocco, Boscorotondo, Serra

Government
  - Mayor: Davide Massaglia

Area
  - Total: 12.1 km^{2} (4.7 sq mi)
- Elevation: 320 m (1,050 ft)

Population (1-1-2017)
  - Total: 449
  - Density: 37.1/km^{2} (96.1/sq mi)
- Demonym: Passeranesi
- Time zone: UTC+1 (CET)
  - Summer (DST): UTC+2 (CEST)
- Postal code: 14020
- Dialing code: 0141

Passerano Marmorito is a small rural comune (municipality) in the Province of Asti in the Italian region Piedmont, about 25 kilometres (16 mi) east of Turin and about 20 kilometres (12 mi) northwest of Asti.

== Geography ==
The capoluogo of the commune, and the site of its town hall, is Passerano. The communal statute identifies three further villages or hamlets within the boundaries of the commune: Marmorito, Primeglio and Schierano (after which the wine grape Malvasia di Schierano is named). Further localities include Boscorotondo, Serra and Rocco.

Passerano Marmorito borders the following municipalities: Albugnano, Aramengo, Capriglio, Castelnuovo Don Bosco, Cerreto d'Asti, Cocconato, Pino d'Asti, and Piovà Massaia.

== Twin towns ==
Passerano Marmorito is twinned with:

- Beauvoisin, Drôme, France (2011)
