= Rivalba =

- Comune
- Comune di Rivalba
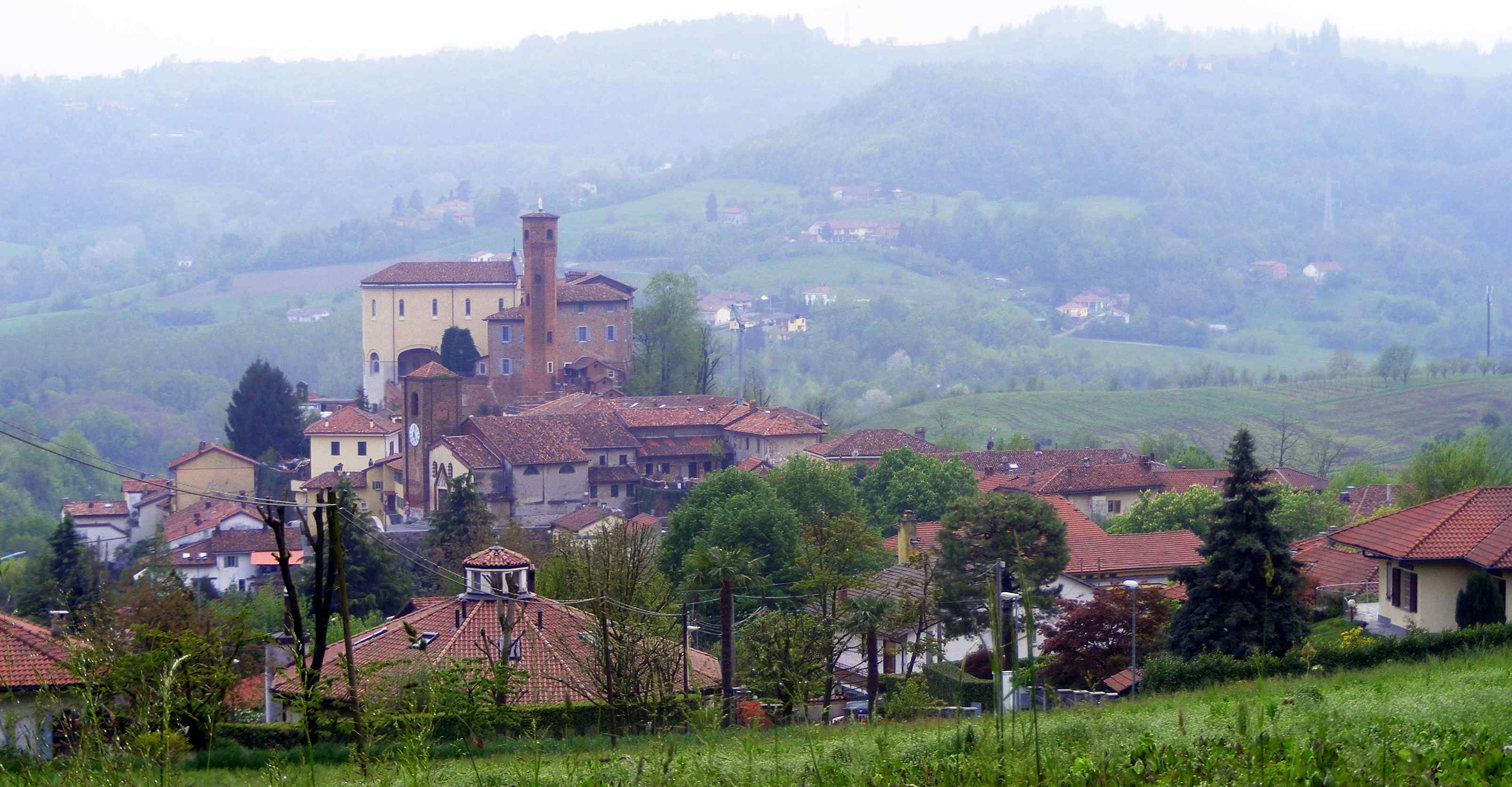

- Coat of arms

- Location within Italy Location within Piedmont
- Coordinates: 45°7′N 7°53′E
- Country: Italy
- Region: Piedmont
- Metropolitan city: Turin (TO)

Government
  - Mayor: Piero Gianella

Area
  - Total: 10.9 km^{2} (4.2 sq mi)
- Elevation: 328 m (1,076 ft)

Population (31 December 2006)
  - Total: 1,028
  - Density: 94.3/km^{2} (244/sq mi)
- Demonym: Rivalbesi
- Time zone: UTC+1 (CET)
  - Summer (DST): UTC+2 (CEST)
- Postal code: 10090
- Dialing code: 011
- Patron saint: Saint Amanzio
- Saint day: first Sunday on August
- Website: www.comune.rivalba.to.it

Rivalba is a comune (municipality) in the Metropolitan City of Turin in the Italian region Piedmont, about 15 kilometres (9 mi) northeast of Turin.

Rivalba borders the following municipalities: Castagneto Po, San Raffaele Cimena, Gassino Torinese, Casalborgone, Sciolze, and Cinzano.

== Twin towns ==
- Els Hostalets de Pierola, Spain
