= Cocconato =

- Comune
- Comune di Cocconato
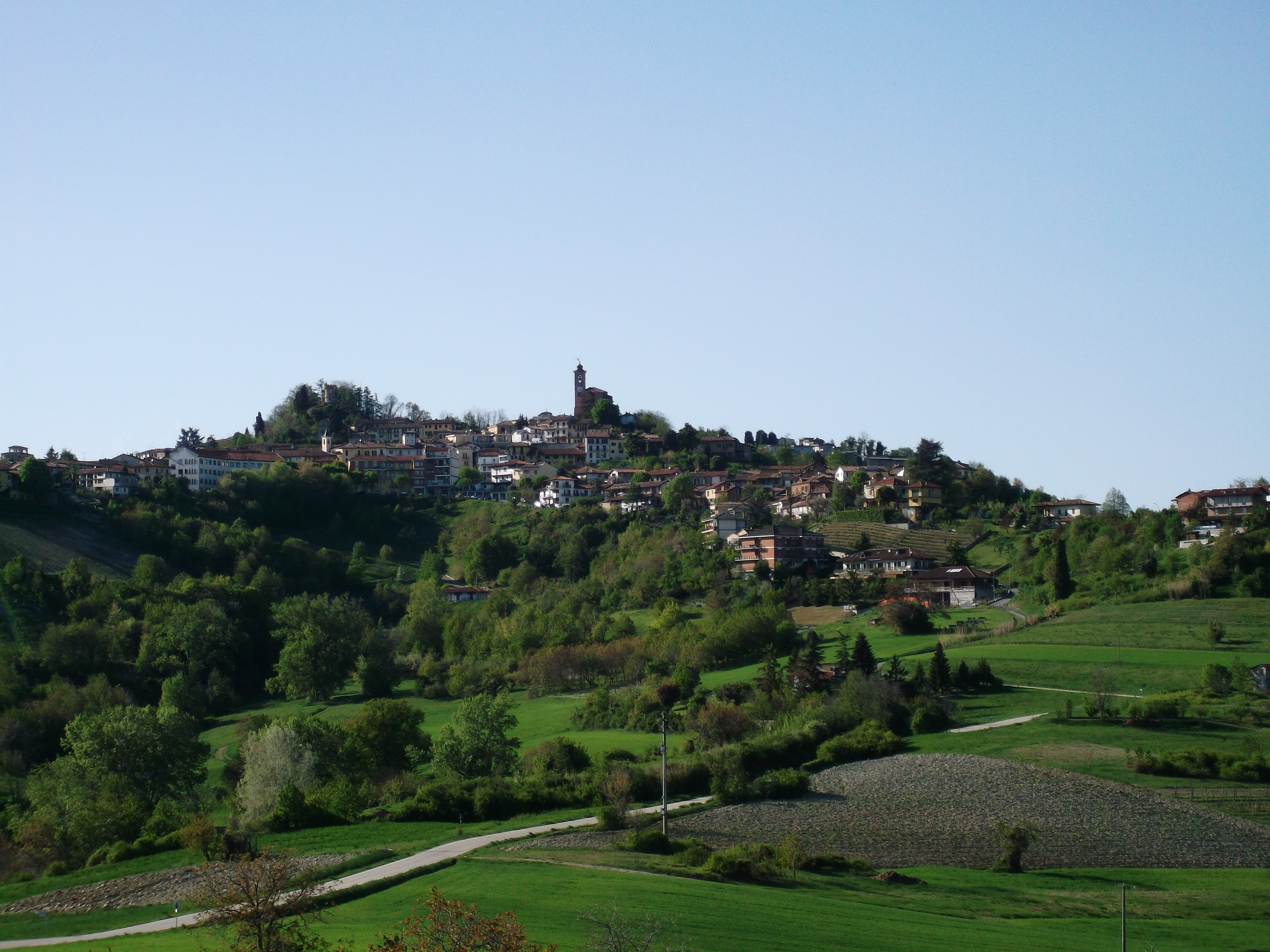
- View of Cocconato

- Coat of arms

- Location within Italy Location within Piedmont
- Coordinates: 45°5′N 8°2′E
- Country: Italy
- Region: Piedmont
- Province: Asti (AT)

Government
  - Mayor: Monica Marello

Area
  - Total: 16.8 km^{2} (6.5 sq mi)
- Elevation: 491 m (1,611 ft)

Population (31 December 2010)
  - Total: 1,609
  - Density: 95.8/km^{2} (248/sq mi)
- Demonym: Cocconatesi
- Time zone: UTC+1 (CET)
  - Summer (DST): UTC+2 (CEST)
- Postal code: 14023
- Dialing code: 0141

Cocconato is a comune (municipality) in the Province of Asti in the Italian region Piedmont, located about 25 kilometres (16 mi) east of Turin and about 25 kilometres (16 mi) northwest of Asti. It is one of I Borghi più belli d'Italia ("The most beautiful villages of Italy").

Cocconato borders the following municipalities: Aramengo, Brozolo, Montiglio Monferrato, Moransengo, Passerano Marmorito, Piovà Massaia, Robella, and Tonengo. It is located on a hill in the Montferrat traditional region, its economy being based on gastronomy (milk, cheese including the robiola of Cocconato) and agriculture.
