= Tonengo =

- Comune
- Comune di Tonengo
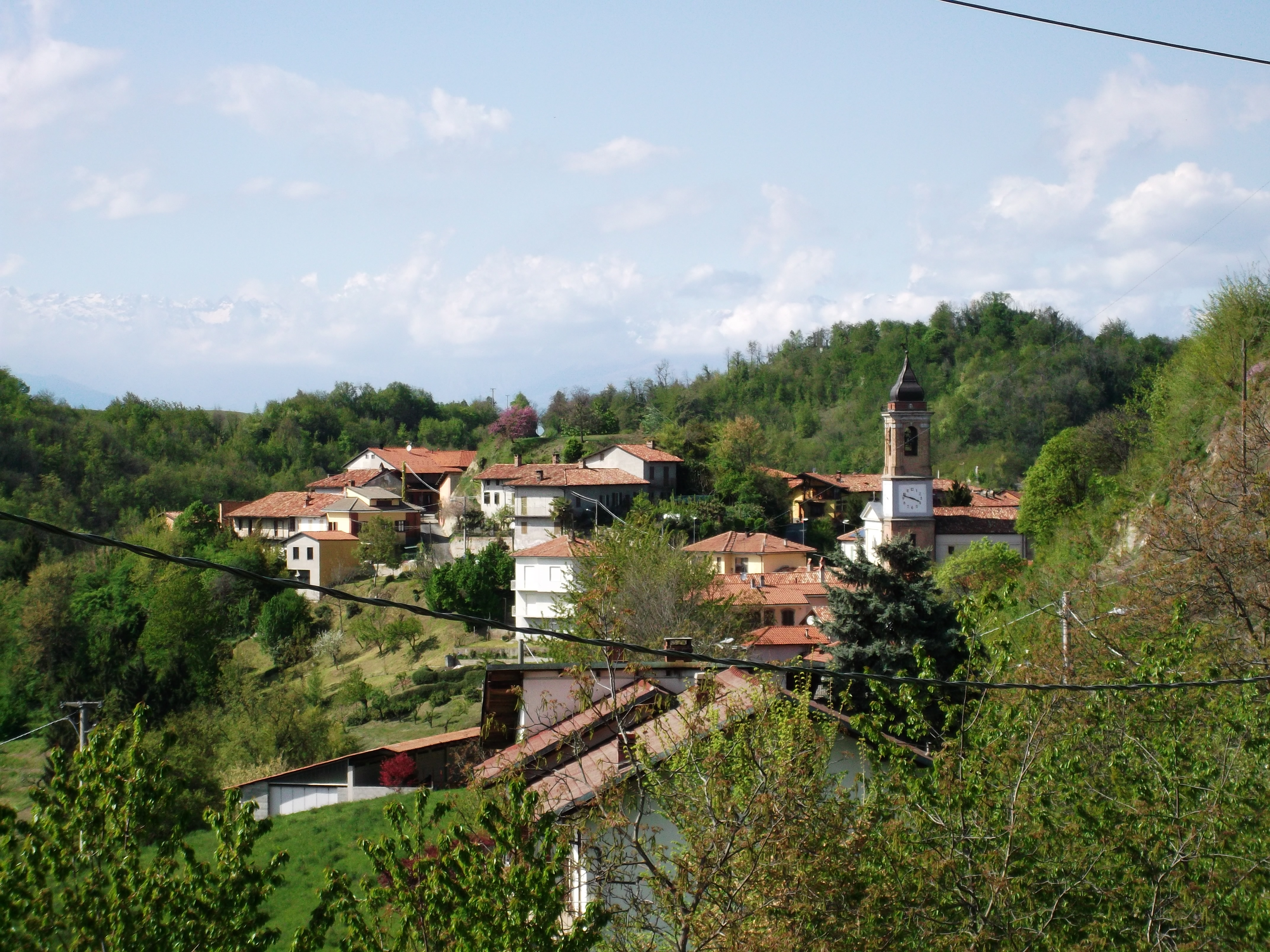

- Location within Italy Location within Piedmont
- Coordinates: 45°7′N 8°0′E
- Country: Italy
- Region: Piedmont
- Province: Asti (AT)

Government
  - Mayor: Raffaele Audino

Area
  - Total: 5.5 km^{2} (2.1 sq mi)
- Elevation: 430 m (1,410 ft)

Population (31 December 2010)
  - Total: 200
  - Density: 36/km^{2} (94/sq mi)
- Demonym: Tonenghesi
- Time zone: UTC+1 (CET)
  - Summer (DST): UTC+2 (CEST)
- Postal code: 14023
- Dialing code: 0141

Tonengo is a comune (municipality) in the Province of Asti in the Italian region Piedmont, located about 25 kilometres (16 mi) east of Turin and about 30 kilometres (19 mi) northwest of Asti. As of 31 December 2004, it had a population of 196 and an area of 5.5 square kilometres (2.1 mi^{2}).

Tonengo borders the following municipalities: Aramengo, Casalborgone, Cavagnolo, Cocconato, Lauriano, and Moransengo.
