= Monteu da Po =

Municipality in Piedmont, Italy

- Comune
- Comune di Monteu da Po
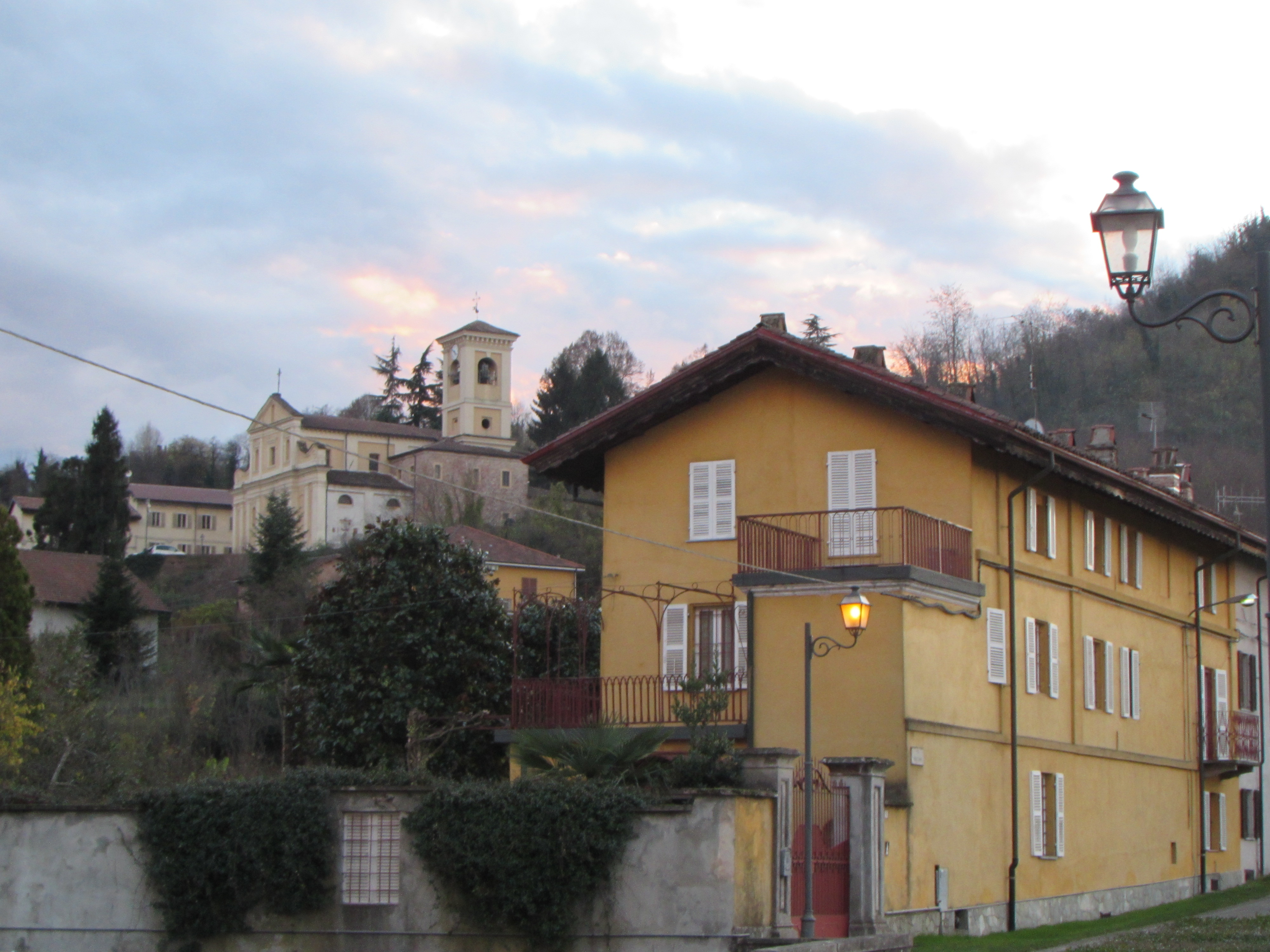
- Remains of Industria.

- Coat of arms

- Location within Italy Location within Piedmont
- Coordinates: 45°11′N 7°58′E
- Country: Italy
- Region: Piedmont
- Metropolitan city: Turin (TO)

Government
  - Mayor: Laura Gastaldo

Area
  - Total: 7 km^{2} (2.7 sq mi)
- Elevation: 177 m (581 ft)

Population (31 December 2010)
  - Total: 897
  - Density: 130/km^{2} (330/sq mi)
- Demonym: Montuesi
- Time zone: UTC+1 (CET)
  - Summer (DST): UTC+2 (CEST)
- Postal code: 10020
- Dialing code: 011

Monteu da Po is a small municipality (Italian: comune) in the Metropolitan City of Turin, Piedmont, Italy, 32 km north-east of Turin.

== History ==
Monteu da Po was an ancient settlement of the Ligures. Its pre-Roman name, which appears on inscriptions of the early imperial period, was Bodincomagus from the Ligurian name of the Po, Bodincus, which meant "bottomless".

In Roman times it became the flourishing colonia named Industria, positioned in the Augustan Regio IX, and enrolled in the tribus Pollia. It was an important river port and market place. Indeed, at that age, the pagus stood on the right bank of the river Po, which has since changed its course, and flows now a kilometer further north.

Excavations have brought to light a tower, a cult building (previously identified as a theatre), a sanctuary of Isis, valuable bronze figures (some of them made locally), shops, and inscriptions. Industria appears to have been deserted in the fourth century CE, probably due to Barbarians raids.

Today name "Monteu" has a not sure provenance.

Main sights include the ruins of Industria and Monteu da Po Castle.
