= San Sebastiano da Po =

- Comune
- Comune di San Sebastiano da Po
- Coat of arms

- Location within Italy Location within Piedmont
- Coordinates: 45°11′N 7°58′E
- Country: Italy
- Region: Piedmont
- Metropolitan city: Turin (TO)
- Frazioni: Abate, Caserma, Colombaro Moriondo, Saronsella, Villa

Government
  - Mayor: Giuseppe Bava

Area
  - Total: 16.6 km^{2} (6.4 sq mi)

Population (31 December 2025)
  - Total: 1,853
  - Density: 112/km^{2} (289/sq mi)
- Demonym: Sansebastianesi
- Time zone: UTC+1 (CET)
  - Summer (DST): UTC+2 (CEST)
- Postal code: 10020
- Dialing code: 011

San Sebastiano da Po is a comune (municipality) in the Metropolitan City of Turin in the Italian region Piedmont, located about 25 kilometres (16 mi) northeast of Turin.

Main sights include San Sebastiano da Po Castle.
