= Brusasco =

- Comune
- Comune di Brusasco
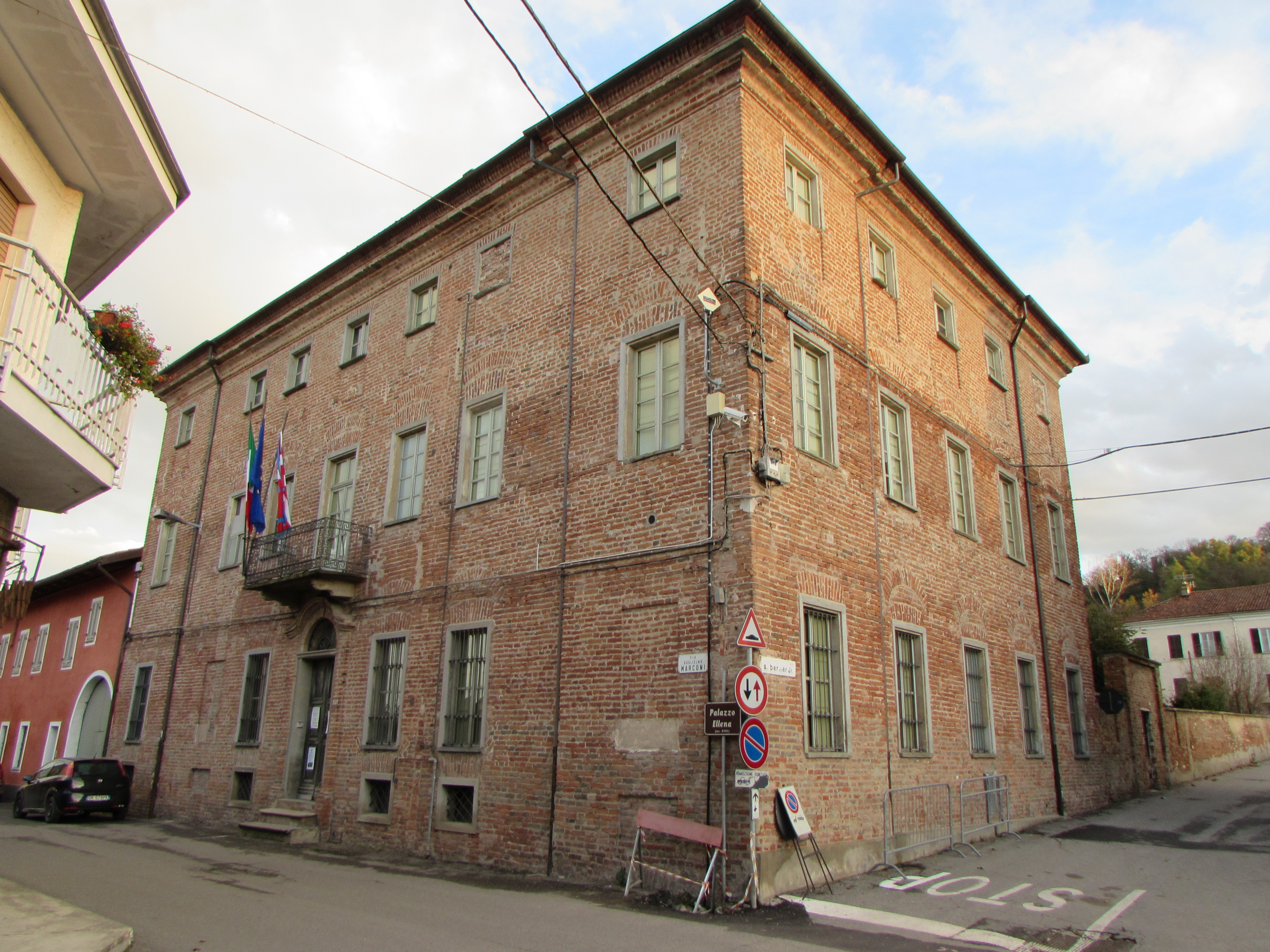
- Palazzo Ellena.

- Coat of arms

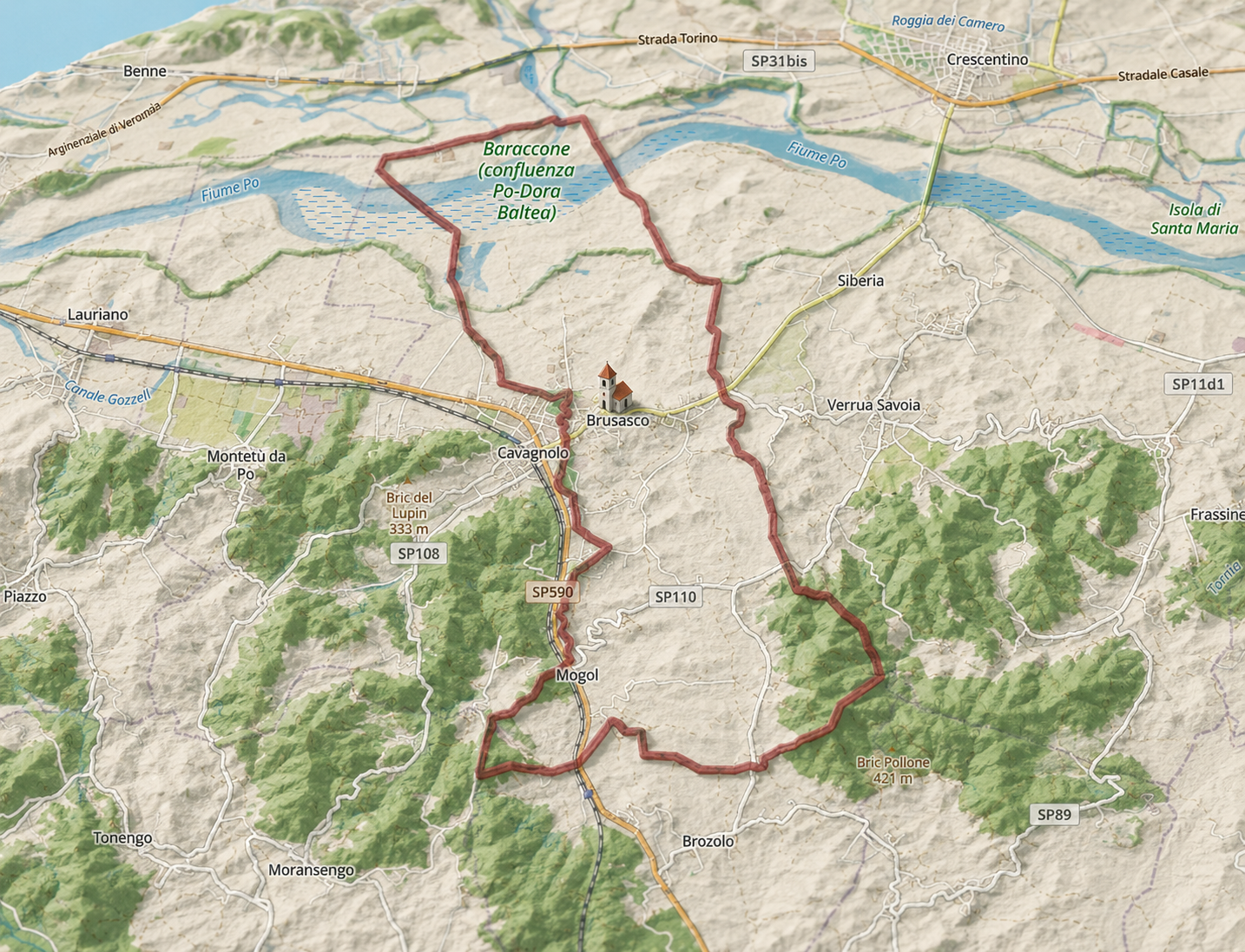

- Location within Italy Location within Piedmont
- Coordinates: 45°9′N 8°4′E
- Country: Italy
- Region: Piedmont
- Metropolitan city: Turin (TO)

Government
  - Mayor: Luciana Trombadore

Area
  - Total: 14.36 km^{2} (5.54 sq mi)

Population (1-1-2017)
  - Total: 1,639
  - Density: 114.1/km^{2} (295.6/sq mi)
- Demonym: Brusaschese(i)
- Time zone: UTC+1 (CET)
  - Summer (DST): UTC+2 (CEST)
- Postal code: 10020
- Dialing code: 011

Brusasco is a comune (municipality) in the Metropolitan City of Turin in the Italian region Piedmont, located about 30 kilometres (19 mi) northeast of Turin. The main sights are the castle and the Palazzo Ellena, both from the 18th century.
