= ASD Asti =

Italian association football club

Asti
- Full name: Associazione Sportiva Dilettantistica Asti
- Founded: 1975; 51 years ago as, ILSA C.D.C. US Cellese; AS Celle Vaglierano; AC Celle General Cab; 2017; 9 years ago as, ASD Alfieri Asti (relocated); 2019; 7 years ago as, ASD Asti
- Ground: Stadio Vincenzo Censin Bosia, Asti, Italy
- Capacity: 6,000
- Chairman: Gianmaria Piacenza
- Manager: Francesco Buglio
- League: Serie D
- 2025–26: Serie D/A, 16th (qualified for relegation playoffs)
- Website: www.asdasti.it

A.S.D. Asti, known as Asti and formerly A.S.D. Alfieri Asti or A.S.D. Colline Alfieri Don Bosco (Colline Alfieri D.B. or just Colline Alfieri (Note: Colline Alfieri is a comunità collinare, a union of comuni and protected by Italian law. It consists of Antignano, Celle Enomondo, Cisterna d'Asti, Revigliasco d'Asti, San Martino Alfieri, San Damiano d'Asti and Tigliole)), is an Italian football club based in Asti, Piedmont. The FIGC registration number of the club is 63,519. It currently plays in Serie D.

== History ==
A.S.D. Asti was founded in 1975. The club was originally based in another town, Celle Enomondo, and known by several other names: ILSA C.D.C., U.S. Cellese, A.S. Celle Vaglierano and A.C. Celle General Cab. (Note: Or spelled as A.S. Celle General Cab according to the club; General Cab is a company based in that town.)

The club was promoted to Prima Categoria for the first time in 2009, as the winners of Group P of Seconda Categoria Piedmont - Aosta Valley. Group P was composed of clubs entirely from the Province of Asti.

In 2010, they were promoted to the Promozione Piedmont - Aosta Valley division, despite finishing fifth in the Prima Categoria Piedmont - Aosta Valley Group F. At the same time the club was renamed "A.S.D. Colline Alfieri Don Bosco" , as a collaboration with another sport club "A.S.D. Don Bosco Asti". (Note: As of 2019, there is another football club also known as "A.S.D. Don Bosco Asti" and formerly "P.G.S. Don Bosco Asti", The club registration number is 913,910. It is not certain it is the same sport club with the A.S.D. Don Bosco Asti of year 2010 or not.) The club also relocated its registered office to San Damiano d'Asti at the same time.

They were promoted to the Eccellenza Piedmont-Aosta Valley from Promozione Piedmont - Aosta Valley in 2016 as a repêchage. The club also played in the Eccellenza division in the 2013–14 and 2014–15 seasons. They hired Mario Benzi as head coach in November 2014.

The club was renamed "A.S.D. Alfieri Asti" in 2017. At the same time, the major club of the city, Asti Calcio F.C. (ex-A.C.D. Asti) folded. The club also promoted youth team coach Davide Montanarelli as the head coach of the first team.

The club finished as the joint-runners-up of the Group B of the Eccellenza Piedmont - Aosta Valley division in the 2018–19 season. However, they lost the promotion play-off against Canelli S.D.S. Both teams also from the province of Asti and that match was the fifth provincial derby of the teams in that season.

In 2019, Alfieri Asti was renamed again, dropping the word "Alfieri" to become "A.S.D. Asti" .

== Famous players ==
- (Italy) Diego Fuser (former Italian international footballer)

== Stadiums ==
The club uses the Stadio Comunale di Asti as its home stadium. The stadium is also known as Stadio Censin Bosia, named after footballer Vincenzo Bosia. A.S.D. Asti shared the stadium with two other clubs of the city: San Domenico Savio and Nuova Sca, and in the past, Asti Calcio F.C.

The club also used Campo Sandro Salvadore (Note: The facility was named after A.C. Milan and Juventus footballer Sandro Salvadore, however, the facility is located on 21 Via Leopoldo Fregoli, Asti. The road itself was named after Leopoldo Fregoli. Salvadore died in 2007; He moved to Castiglione frazione, Asti in 1975.) as well as Campo Comunale di Celle Enomondo, on 9 Strada Pozzo, Celle Enomondo as football fields.

In 2015–16 season, the first team of the club had used the football field in Moncalvo, but declared its headquarters in Asti.

== Honours ==
- Promozione Piedmont - Aosta Valley Group D
  - Winners: 2013
- Seconda Categoria Piedmont - Aosta Valley Group P
  - Winners: 2009

== See also ==
- John Bosco, or known as Don Bosco
