= Asti Calcio FC =

Italian football club

Asti
- Full name: Asti Calcio Football Club S.r.l.
- Nickname: Galletti (Cockerels)
- Founded: 1932
- Dissolved: 2017
- Ground: Stadio Cesin Bosia
- League: N/A
- 2016–17: 8th, Promozione Piedmont - Aosta Valley Group D
Home colours	Away colours

Asti Calcio Football Club S.r.l. was an Italian association football club based in Asti, Piedmont. The FIGC registration number of the club was 81,850.

== History ==
Founded officially in 1932 under the name Associazione Calcio Asti (in short: A.C. Asti), the club changed its name several times in subsequent years because of mergers with local clubs. The club participated in Serie C league in the past.

In 2006, the club changed the name from A.C. Asti to A.C.D. Asti Colligiana.

The club reverted to original name A.C.D. Asti during the celebrations for the 75th year of operation in 2008. The club later incorporated as a società a responsabilità limitata as S.D. Asti Calcio S.r.l.. Asti also partnered with Torino F.C. in youth football in 2013.

The club finished as the 14th of the Group A in the 2014–15 Serie D season.

At the start of 2015–16 Serie D season the club was expelled from the league by FIGC's Co.Vi.So.D., due to the club's financial position. The club had appealed to CONI's Collegio di Garanzia dello Sport, however, the court rejected the appeal and confirming FIGC's decision. In that transfer window, the club also attempted to split into two legal persons, leaving only one legal person to bear the debt. At the same time, the club attempted to merge with Prima Categoria club A.S.D. Sandamianese Asti. It was reported that the attempt to transfer the debt was failed. Asti also changed the name to Asti Calcio F.C. S.r.l.. While Sandamianese became A.S.D. Pro Asti Sandamianese, and relocated from San Damiano d'Asti to Asti. Asti was admitted to Lega Nazionale Dilettanti's (LND) Promozione - Piedmont - Aosta Valley division - Group D instead in September 2015.

In May 2017, the club was penalized 2 points, to be applied to 2017–18 season. A shareholder and director of Asti, Pier Paolo Gherlone was also investigated by the FIGC. Gherlone also owned Pro Asti Sandamianese until 2017.

Asti Calcio F.C. bankrupted in 2017.

Asti's FIGC membership was finally revoked in December 2017. While the membership of the spin-off, Pro Asti Sandamianese, was also cancelled in 2019 due to inactivity.

== Colors and badge ==
The team's colors are white and red.

== Phoenix clubs ==
Another club, Colline Alfieri Don Bosco (FIGC registration number: 63519) was renamed to A.S.D. Alfieri Asti as an illegitimate phoenix club. In 2019 the club was renamed to A.S.D. Asti. The club has no relation to yet another club, Don Bosco Asti. The club played in Eccellenza Piedmont-Aosta Valley since 2017 (as of 2019–20 season).
