= Rabino =

Rabino may refer to:

- Rąbino, a village in Świdwin County, West Pomeranian Voivodeship, Poland
- Gmina Rąbino, an administrative district rural gmina in Świdwin County, West Pomeranian Voivodeship, Poland
- Andrea Rabino (born 1978), former Italian sprinter
- Giovanni Battista Rabino (1931-2020), Italian politician
- Rabino Chandra (died 1801), Manipuri king
