= Buglio =

Buglio is an Italian surname. Notable people with the surname include:

- Davide Buglio (born 1998), Italian footballer
- Francesco Buglio (born 1957), Italian footballer
- Lodovico Buglio (1606–1682), Italian Jesuit mathematician and theologian
