= Govone (disambiguation) =

Govone is a municipality in Piedmont, Italy.

Govone may also refer to:

- Giuseppe Govone, an Italian general and politician of Risorgimento
- GovOne, company acquired by First Data
