= Celle Enomondo =

- Comune
- Comune di Celle Enomondo
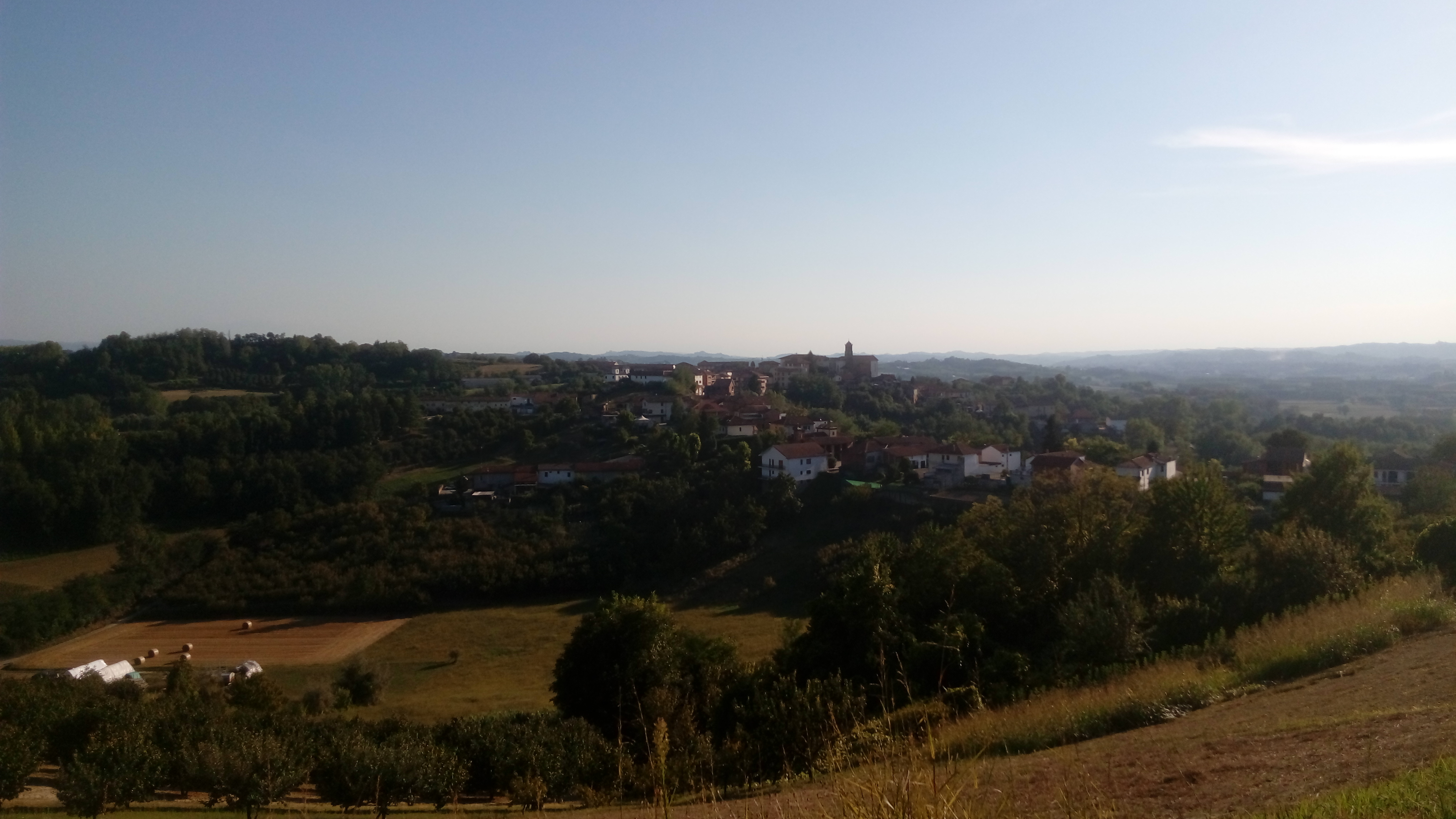
- View of Celle Enomondo

- Location within Italy Location within Piedmont
- Coordinates: 44°51′N 8°7′E
- Country: Italy
- Region: Piedmont
- Province: Asti (AT)

Area
  - Total: 5.5 km^{2} (2.1 sq mi)
- Elevation: 234 m (768 ft)

Population (31 December 2010)
  - Total: 481
  - Density: 87/km^{2} (230/sq mi)
- Demonym: Cellesi
- Time zone: UTC+1 (CET)
  - Summer (DST): UTC+2 (CEST)
- Postal code: 14010
- Dialing code: 0141
- Website: www.comune.celleenomondo.at.it/en

Celle Enomondo is a comune (municipality) in the Province of Asti in the Italian region Piedmont, located about 40 kilometres (25 mi) southeast of Turin and about 9 kilometres (6 mi) southwest of Asti.

Celle Enomondo borders the following municipalities: Antignano, Asti, Revigliasco d'Asti, and San Damiano d'Asti.

== Climate ==
Climate in this area has mild differences between highs and lows, and there is adequate rainfall year-round. The Köppen Climate Classification subtype for this climate is "Cfb" (Marine West Coast Climate/Oceanic climate).

== Sport ==
The town had a football club known as U.S. Cellese, and later A.S. Celle Vaglierano and A.C. Celle General Cab. However, the club was relocated and as of 2019 known as A.S.D. Asti.
