= Montegrosso d'Asti =

- Comune
- Comune di Montegrosso d'Asti
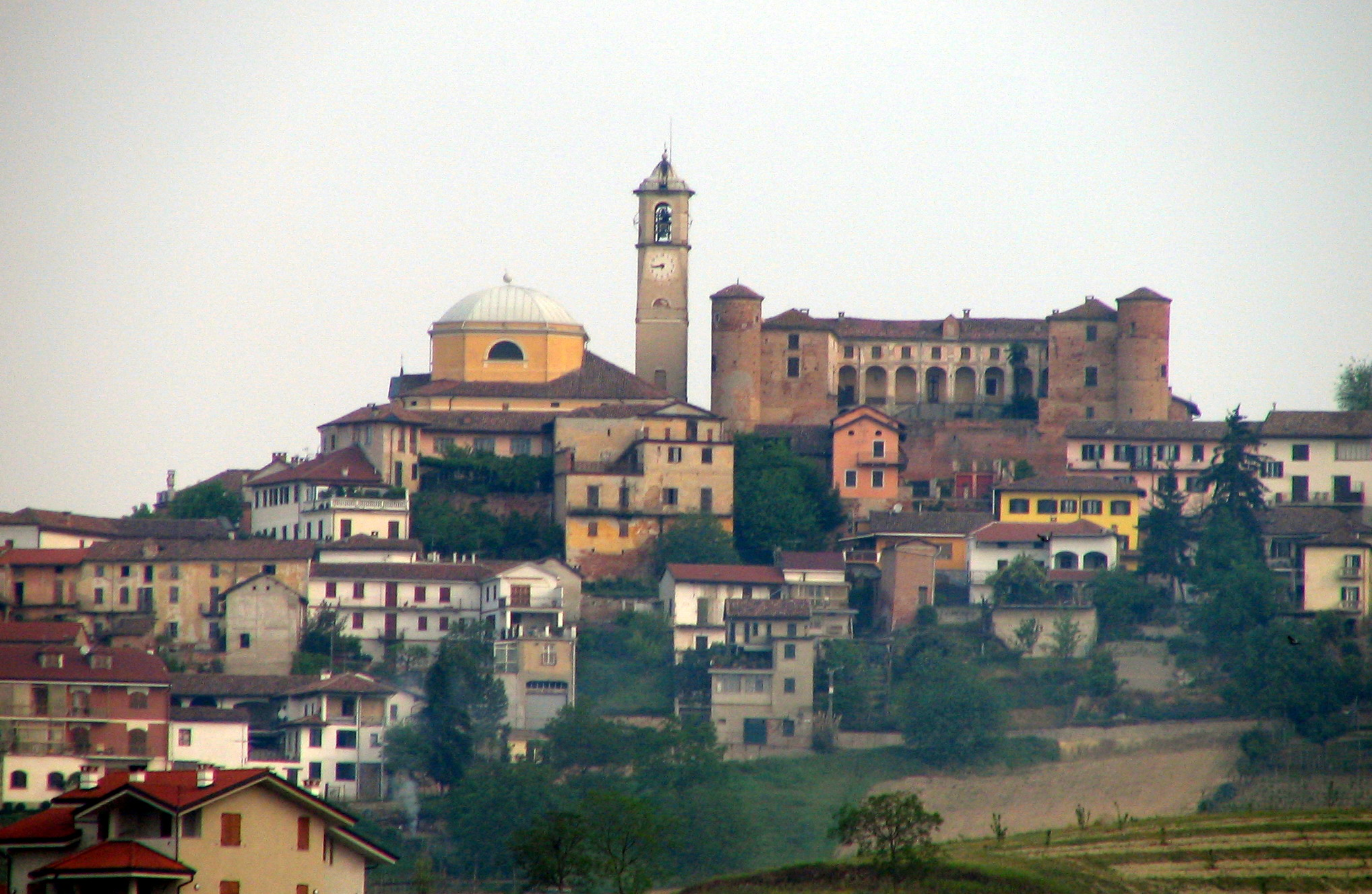
- View of Montegrosso d'Asti

- Coat of arms

- Location within Italy Location within Piedmont
- Coordinates: 44°50′N 8°15′E
- Country: Italy
- Region: Piedmont
- Province: Asti (AT)
- Frazioni: Basolo, Boscogrande, Bricco Monti, Gallareto, Gorra, Messadio, Moroni, Palazzo, Santo Stefano, Tana, Valenzano, Vallumida

Government
  - Mayor: Marco Curto

Area
  - Total: 15.42 km^{2} (5.95 sq mi)
- Elevation: 244 m (801 ft)

Population (31 December 2017)
  - Total: 2,338
  - Density: 151.6/km^{2} (392.7/sq mi)
- Demonym: Montegrossesi
- Time zone: UTC+1 (CET)
  - Summer (DST): UTC+2 (CEST)
- Postal code: 14048
- Dialing code: 0141
- Website: Official website

Montegrosso d'Asti is a comune (municipality) in the Province of Asti in the Italian region Piedmont, located about 50 kilometres (31 mi) southeast of Turin and about 8 kilometres (5 mi) southeast of Asti.

Montegrosso d'Asti borders the following municipalities: Agliano Terme, Castelnuovo Calcea, Costigliole d'Asti, Isola d'Asti, Mombercelli, Montaldo Scarampi, Rocca d'Arazzo, and Vigliano d'Asti.
