= Isola d'Asti =

- Comune
- Comune di Isola d'Asti
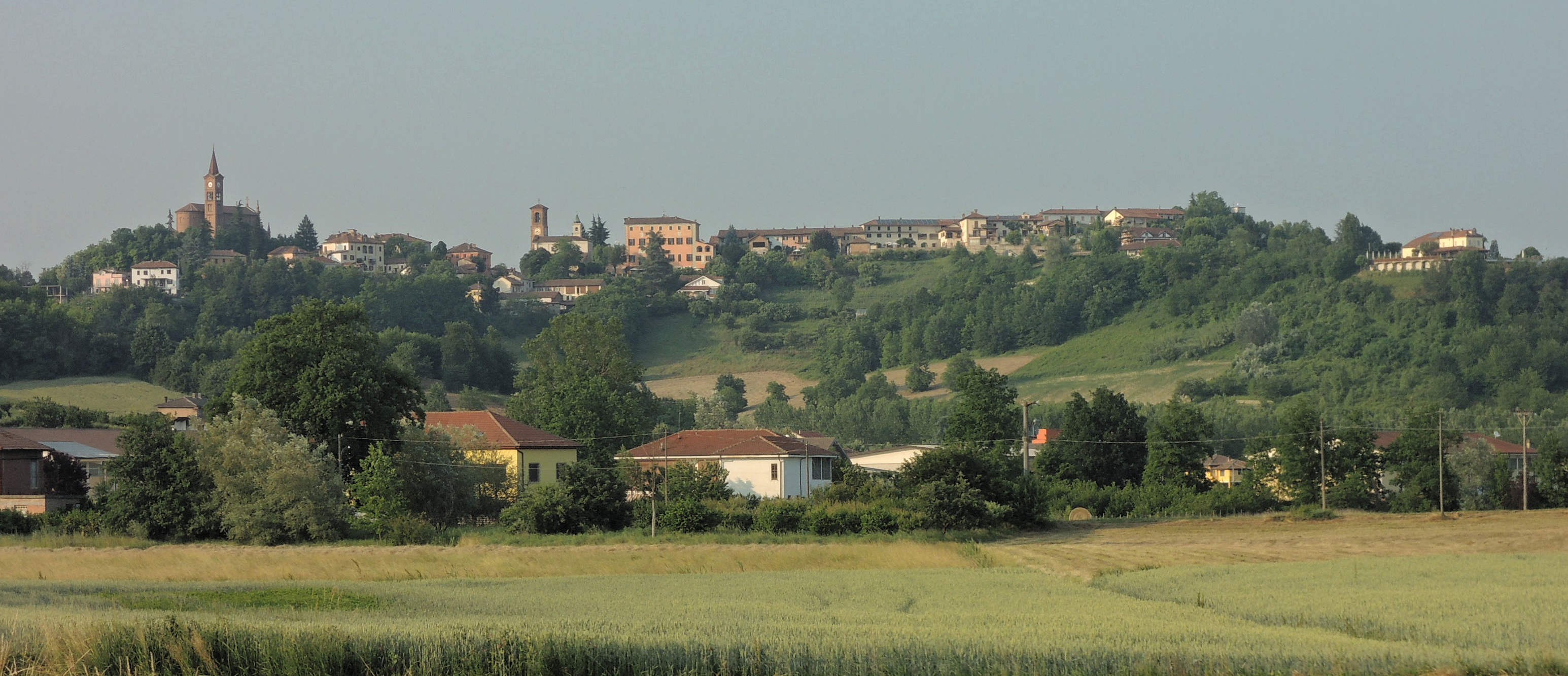
- View of Isola d'Asti

- Coat of arms

- Location within Italy Location within Piedmont
- Coordinates: 44°50′N 8°11′E
- Country: Italy
- Region: Piedmont
- Province: Asti (AT)
- Frazioni: Chiappa, Mongovone, Isola Piano (municipal seat), Repergo, Villa

Government
  - Mayor: Fabrizio Pace

Area
  - Total: 13.5 km^{2} (5.2 sq mi)
- Elevation: 136 m (446 ft)

Population (31 August 2017)
  - Total: 2,040
  - Density: 151/km^{2} (391/sq mi)
- Demonym: Isolani
- Time zone: UTC+1 (CET)
  - Summer (DST): UTC+2 (CEST)
- Postal code: 14057
- Dialing code: 0141
- Website: Official website

Isola d'Asti is a comune (municipality) in the Province of Asti in the Italian region Piedmont, located about 45 kilometres (28 mi) southeast of Turin and about 8 kilometres (5 mi) south of Asti.

Isola d'Asti borders the following municipalities: Antignano, Asti, Costigliole d'Asti, Mongardino, Montegrosso d'Asti, Revigliasco d'Asti, and Vigliano d'Asti. The municipal seat is in the frazione of Isola Piano.

== People ==
- Giuseppe Govone (1825–1872), Italian general, patriot and politician.
- Angelo Sodano (1927–2022), cardinal.
