= Cerro Tanaro =

- Comune
- Comune di Cerro Tanaro
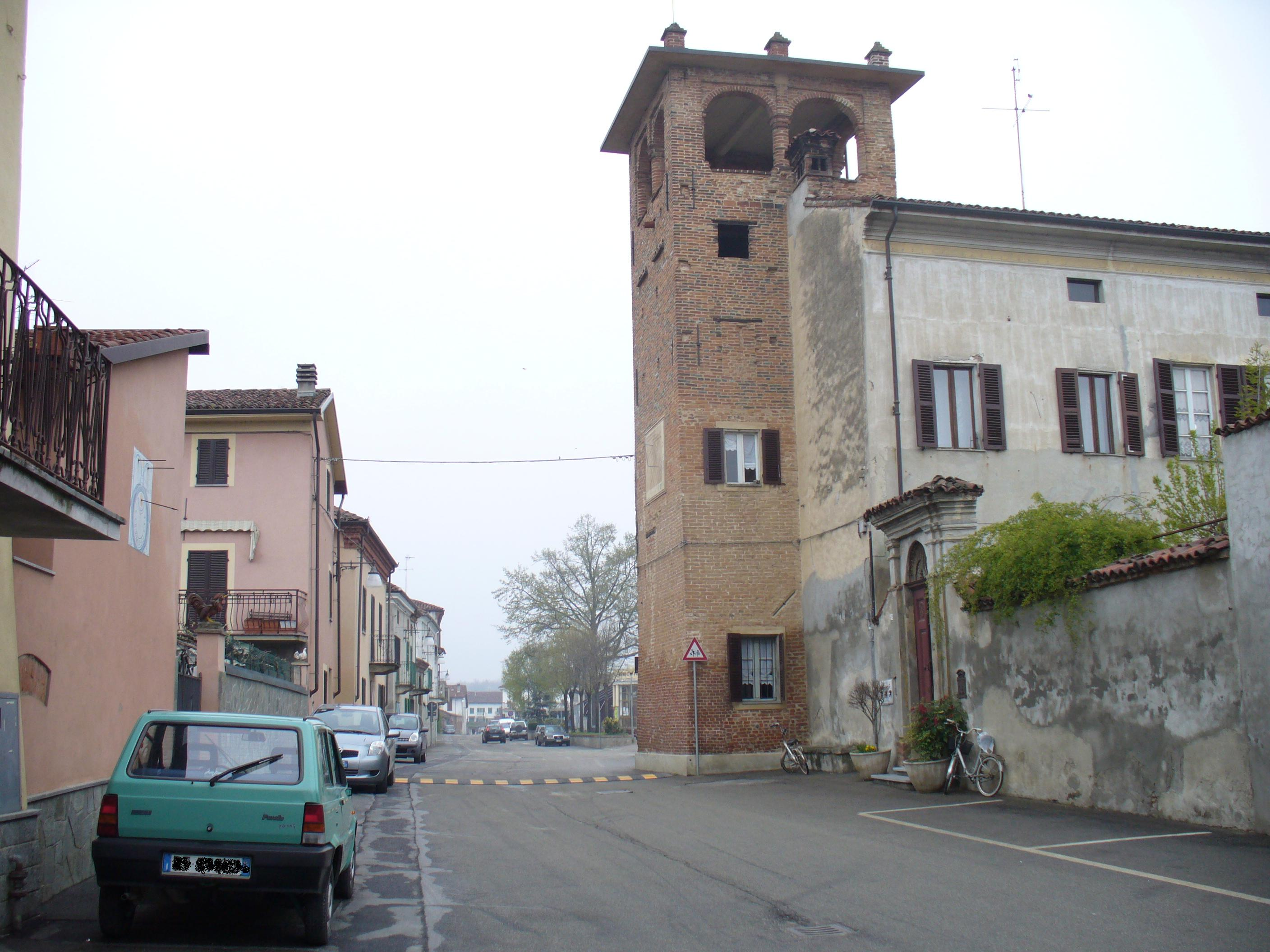
- View of Cerro Tanaro

- Coat of arms

- Location within Italy Location within Piedmont
- Coordinates: 44°52′N 8°22′E
- Country: Italy
- Region: Piedmont
- Province: Asti (AT)

Government
  - Mayor: Mauro Malaga

Area
  - Total: 4.7 km^{2} (1.8 sq mi)
- Elevation: 109 m (358 ft)

Population (1 January 2010)
  - Total: 648
  - Density: 140/km^{2} (360/sq mi)
- Demonym: Cerresi
- Time zone: UTC+1 (CET)
  - Summer (DST): UTC+2 (CEST)
- Postal code: 14030
- Dialing code: 0141
- Website: Official website

Cerro Tanaro is a comune (municipality) in the Province of Asti in the Italian region Piedmont, located about 60 kilometres (37 mi) southeast of Turin and about 14 kilometres (9 mi) southeast of Asti.

Cerro Tanaro borders the following municipalities: Castello di Annone, Masio, Quattordio, and Rocchetta Tanaro.
