= Mombercelli =

- Comune
- Comune di Mombercelli
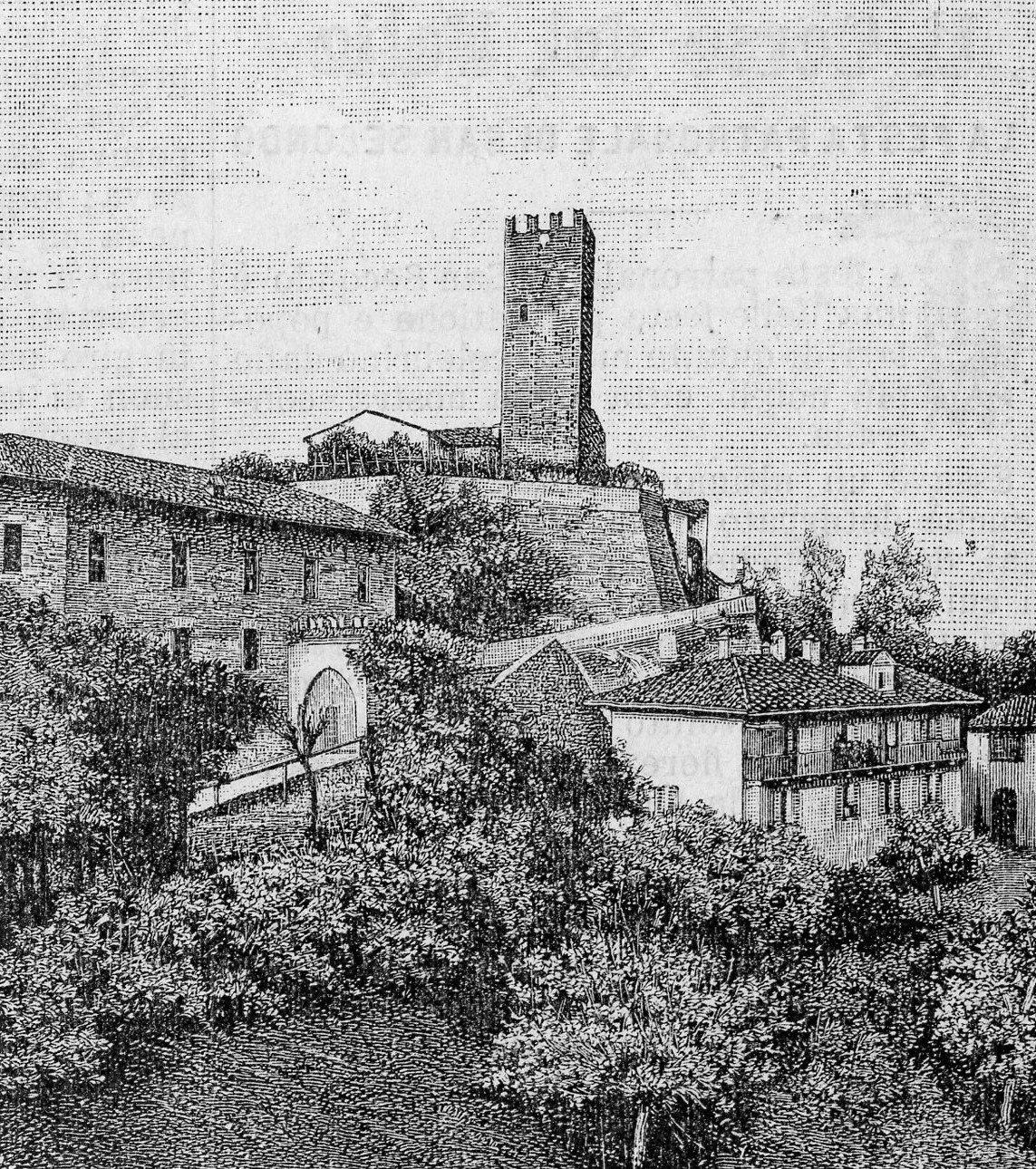

- Location within Italy Location within Piedmont
- Coordinates: 44°49′N 8°18′E
- Country: Italy
- Region: Piedmont
- Province: Asti (AT)

Government
  - Mayor: Ivan Ferrero

Area
  - Total: 14.23 km^{2} (5.49 sq mi)
- Elevation: 233 m (764 ft)

Population (31 December 2019)
  - Total: 2,126
  - Density: 149.4/km^{2} (387.0/sq mi)
- Demonym: Mombercellesi
- Time zone: UTC+1 (CET)
  - Summer (DST): UTC+2 (CEST)
- Postal code: 14047
- Dialing code: 0141
- Website: Official website

Mombercelli is a comune (municipality) in the Province of Asti in the Italian region Piedmont, located about 50 kilometres (31 mi) southeast of Turin and about 12 kilometres (7 mi) southeast of Asti.

Mombercelli borders the following municipalities: Belveglio, Castelnuovo Calcea, Montaldo Scarampi, Montegrosso d'Asti, Rocca d'Arazzo, Rocchetta Tanaro, and Vinchio. It is located on a hill that is a local center of wine production.

== Twin towns ==
Mombercelli is twinned with:

- Villedieu-sur-Indre, France
