= Rocca d'Arazzo =

- Comune
- Comune di Rocca d'Arazzo
- Coat of arms

- Location within Italy Location within Piedmont
- Coordinates: 44°52′N 8°17′E
- Country: Italy
- Region: Piedmont
- Province: Asti (AT)

Area
  - Total: 12.56 km^{2} (4.85 sq mi)
- Elevation: 195 m (640 ft)

Population (30 November 2016)
  - Total: 937
  - Density: 74.6/km^{2} (193/sq mi)
- Demonym: Rocchesi
- Time zone: UTC+1 (CET)
  - Summer (DST): UTC+2 (CEST)
- Postal code: 14030
- Dialing code: 0141
- Website: Official website

Rocca d'Arazzo is a comune (municipality) in the Province of Asti in the Italian region Piedmont, located about 50 kilometres (31 mi) southeast of Turin and about 8 kilometres (5 mi) southeast of Asti.

Rocca d'Arazzo borders the following municipalities: Asti, Azzano d'Asti, Castello di Annone, Mombercelli, Montaldo Scarampi, Montegrosso d'Asti, Rocchetta Tanaro, and Vigliano d'Asti.
