= Castello di Annone =

- Comune
- Comune di Castello di Annone
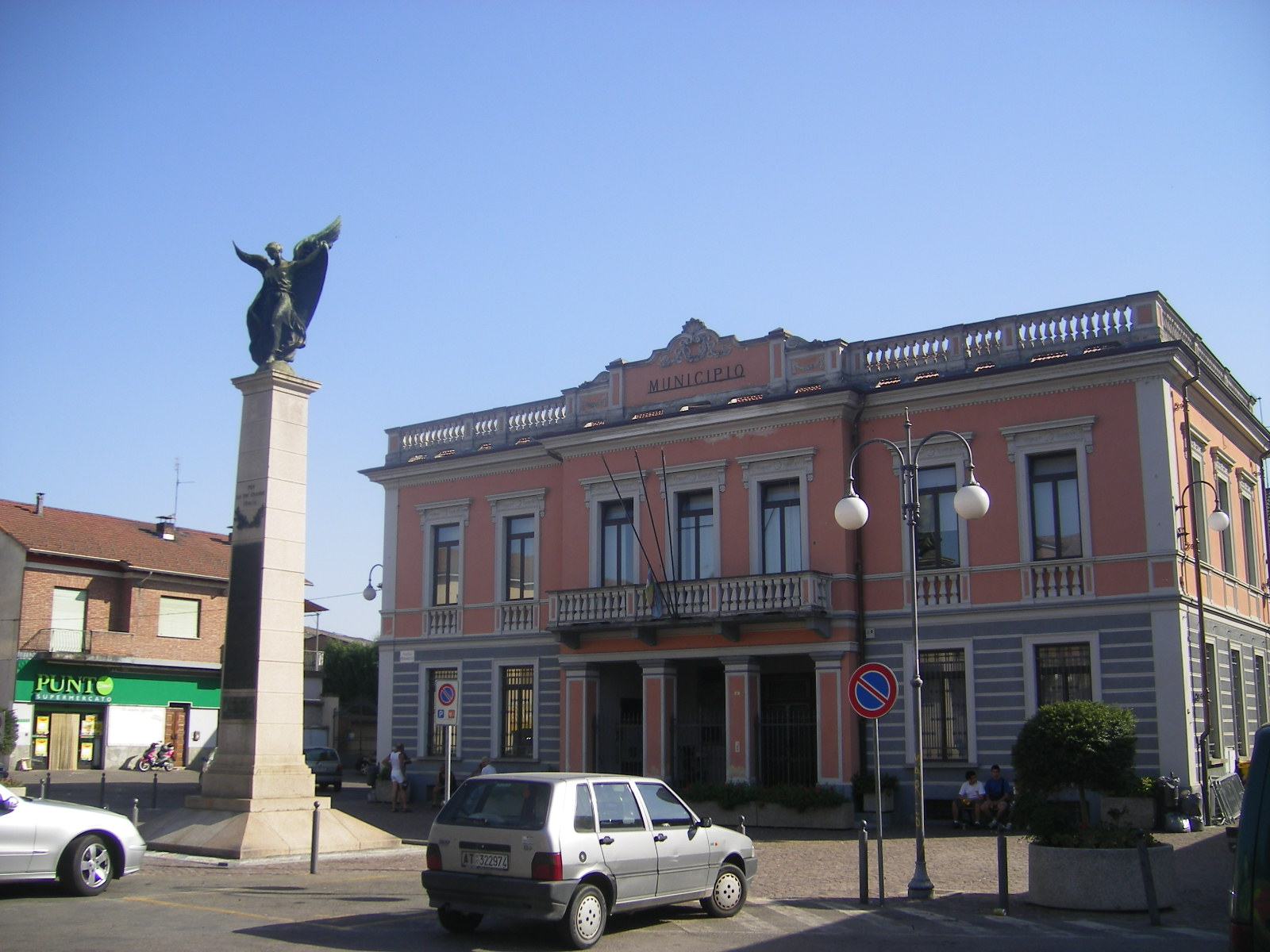
- View of Castello di Annone

- Coat of arms

- Location within Italy Location within Piedmont
- Coordinates: 44°53′N 8°19′E
- Country: Italy
- Region: Piedmont
- Province: Asti (AT)
- Frazioni: Alberoni, Bordoni, Crocetta, Monfallito, Poggio

Government
  - Mayor: Valter Valfrè

Area
  - Total: 23.2 km^{2} (9.0 sq mi)

Population (1 January 2010)
  - Total: 1,963
  - Density: 84.6/km^{2} (219/sq mi)
- Demonym: Annonesi
- Time zone: UTC+1 (CET)
  - Summer (DST): UTC+2 (CEST)
- Postal code: 14034
- Dialing code: 0141
- Website: Official website

Castello di Annone is a comune (municipality) in the Province of Asti in the Italian region Piedmont, located about 50 kilometres (31 mi) southeast of Turin and about 9 kilometres (6 mi) east of Asti.

Castello di Annone borders the following municipalities: Asti, Cerro Tanaro, Quattordio, Refrancore, Rocca d'Arazzo, and Rocchetta Tanaro. Its name derives from the Latin ad nonum ("nine miles"), indicating its distance from Asti. In the Middle Ages it was an important strategic hub, until it was destroyed by Spanish troops in 1644. In 1994 it was flooded by the nearby Tanaro river.
