= Quattordio =

- Comune
- Comune di Quattordio
- Coat of arms

- Location within Italy Location within Piedmont
- Coordinates: 44°54′N 8°24′E
- Country: Italy
- Region: Piedmont
- Province: Alessandria (AL)

Government
  - Mayor: Tiziana Garberi

Area
  - Total: 17.8 km^{2} (6.9 sq mi)
- Elevation: 135 m (443 ft)

Population (2007)
  - Total: 1,704
  - Density: 95.7/km^{2} (248/sq mi)
- Demonym: Quattordiesi
- Time zone: UTC+1 (CET)
  - Summer (DST): UTC+2 (CEST)
- Postal code: 15028
- Dialing code: 0131
- Website: Official website

Quattordio (Quatòrdi in Piedmontese) is a comune (municipality) in the Province of Alessandria in the Italian region Piedmont, located about 60 kilometres (37 mi) southeast of Turin and about 15 kilometres (9 mi) west of Alessandria.

Quattordio borders the following municipalities: Castello di Annone, Cerro Tanaro, Felizzano, Masio, Refrancore, and Viarigi. Despite its small population, the town has been, for more than 70 years, an important industrial site (particularly with regard to paint industry). The name derives from the Latin Quattuordecimum ("fourteenth"), indicating its distance from Asti.
