= Giovanni Battista Rabino =

Italian politician (1931–2020)

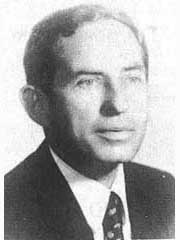

Member of the Chamber of Deputies
- In office 12 July 1983 – 22 April 1992
- Constituency: Cuneo

Member of the Senate of the Republic
- In office 23 April 1992 – 14 April 1994
- Constituency: Piedmont

Mayor of Montaldo Scarampi
- In office 14 June 2004 – 8 June 2009
- Preceded by: Enzo Forno
- Succeeded by: Francesco Manassero

Personal details
- Born: 15 December 1931 Montaldo Scarampi, Kingdom of Italy
- Died: 12 March 2020 (aged 88) Asti, Italy
- Cause of death: COVID-19
- Party: Christian Democracy
- Children: 2
- Profession: Politician, trade unionist

Giovanni Battista Rabino (15 December 1931 – 12 March 2020) was an Italian politician from the Christian Democracy party who served as member of the Chamber of Deputies from 1983 to 1992, then a single term, between 1992 and 1994, as Senator.

== Biography ==
He was born in Montaldo Scarampi, and served as mayor of the city between 2004 and 2009. Before his political career, Rabino was a trade unionist, active in Alessandria's Coldiretti branch.

Rabino died from COVID-19 at the Cardinal Massaja Hospital in Asti on 12 March 2020. His funeral was held two days later.
