= Vigliano d'Asti =

- Comune
- Comune di Vigliano d'Asti
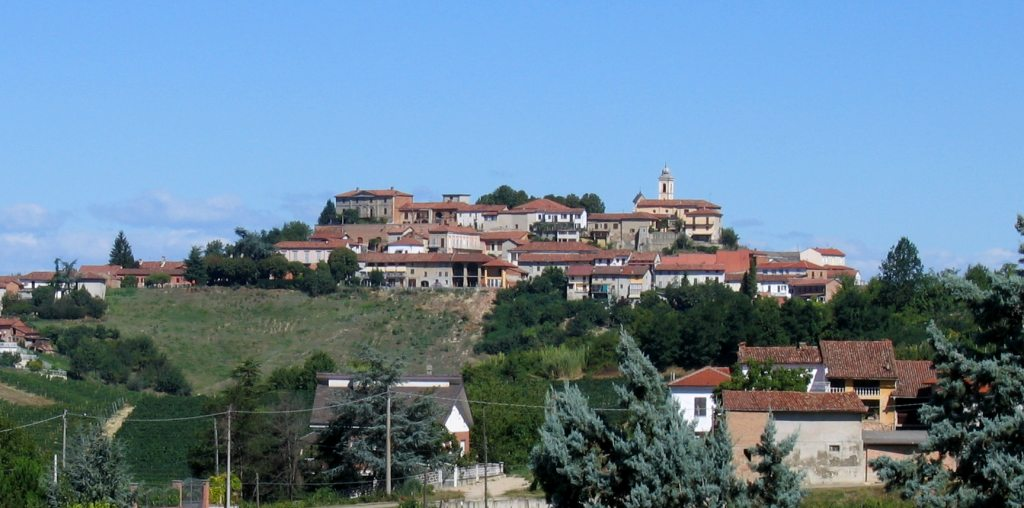

- Coat of arms

- Location within Italy Location within Piedmont
- Coordinates: 44°50′N 8°14′E
- Country: Italy
- Region: Piedmont
- Province: Asti (AT)
- Frazioni: Boglietto, Camicia, Francia, Quassolo, Ramello, Sabbionera, San Carlo, Valgrande, Valmontasca, Valpozzo, Valtiglione

Government
  - Mayor: Emma Jonne Adorno

Area
  - Total: 6.65 km^{2} (2.57 sq mi)
- Elevation: 279 m (915 ft)

Population (31 December 2010)
  - Total: 880
  - Density: 130/km^{2} (340/sq mi)
- Demonym: Viglianesi
- Time zone: UTC+1 (CET)
  - Summer (DST): UTC+2 (CEST)
- Postal code: 14040
- Dialing code: 0141
- Website: Official website

Vigliano d'Asti is a comune (municipality) in the Province of Asti in the Italian region Piedmont, located about 50 kilometres (31 mi) southeast of Turin and about 8 kilometres (5 mi) southeast of Asti.

Vigliano d'Asti borders the following municipalities: Asti, Isola d'Asti, Mongardino, Montegrosso d'Asti, and Rocca d'Arazzo.
