= Rocchetta Tanaro =

- Comune
- Comune di Rocchetta Tanaro
- Location within Italy Location within Piedmont
- Coordinates: 44°52′N 8°21′E
- Country: Italy
- Region: Piedmont
- Province: Province of Asti (AT)

Area
  - Total: 16.0 km^{2} (6.2 sq mi)

Population (Dec. 2004)
  - Total: 1,454
  - Density: 90.9/km^{2} (235/sq mi)
- Time zone: UTC+1 (CET)
  - Summer (DST): UTC+2 (CEST)
- Postal code: 14030
- Dialing code: 0141
- Website: Official website

Rocchetta Tanaro is a comune (municipality) in the Province of Asti in the Italian region Piedmont, located about 60 kilometres (37 mi) southeast of Turin and about 12 kilometres (7 mi) southeast of Asti. As of 31 December 2004, it had a population of 1,454 and an area of 16.0 square kilometres (6.2 mi^{2}).

Rocchetta Tanaro borders the following municipalities: Belveglio, Castello di Annone, Cerro Tanaro, Cortiglione, Masio, Mombercelli, and Rocca d'Arazzo.

== Demographic evolution ==
Historical population

Year	Pop.	±%
1861	3,263	—
1871	3,382	+3.6%
1881	3,384	+0.1%
1901	3,316	−2.0%
1911	3,200	−3.5%

Year	Pop.	±%
1921	3,300	+3.1%
1931	2,801	−15.1%
1936	2,724	−2.7%
1951	2,253	−17.3%
1961	1,894	−15.9%

Year	Pop.	±%
1971	1,680	−11.3%
1981	1,594	−5.1%
1991	1,501	−5.8%
2001	1,410	−6.1%

Source: Data from ISTAT

== Twin towns ==
Rocchetta Tanaro is twinned with:

- Donnas, Italy (2002)
- Funabashi, Japan (2023)
- (United States) Miami-Dade, U.S.A. (2005)
