= Mongardino =

- Comune
- Comune di Mongardino
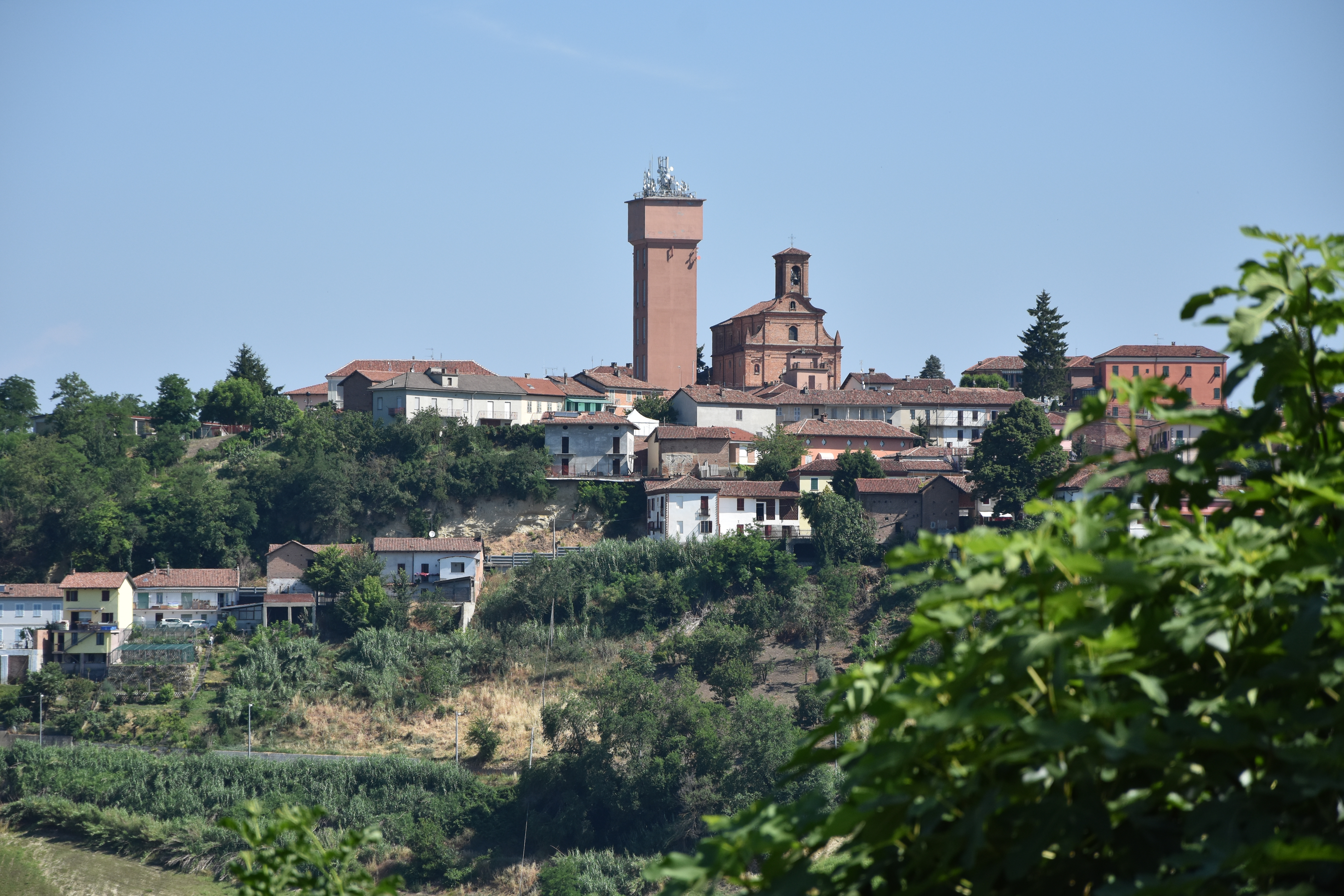

- Coat of arms

- Location within Italy Location within Piedmont
- Coordinates: 44°51′N 8°13′E
- Country: Italy
- Region: Piedmont
- Province: Province of Asti (AT)

Area
  - Total: 6.7 km^{2} (2.6 sq mi)

Population (Dec. 2004)
  - Total: 989
  - Density: 150/km^{2} (380/sq mi)
- Time zone: UTC+1 (CET)
  - Summer (DST): UTC+2 (CEST)
- Postal code: 14040
- Dialing code: 0141
- Website: Official website

Mongardino is a comune (municipality) in the Province of Asti in the Italian region Piedmont, located about 45 kilometres (28 mi) southeast of Turin and about 6 kilometres (4 mi) south of Asti. As of 31 December 2004, it had a population of 989 and an area of 6.7 square kilometres (2.6 mi^{2}).

Mongardino borders the following municipalities: Asti, Isola d'Asti, and Vigliano d'Asti.
