= Antignano =

- Comune
- Comune di Antignano
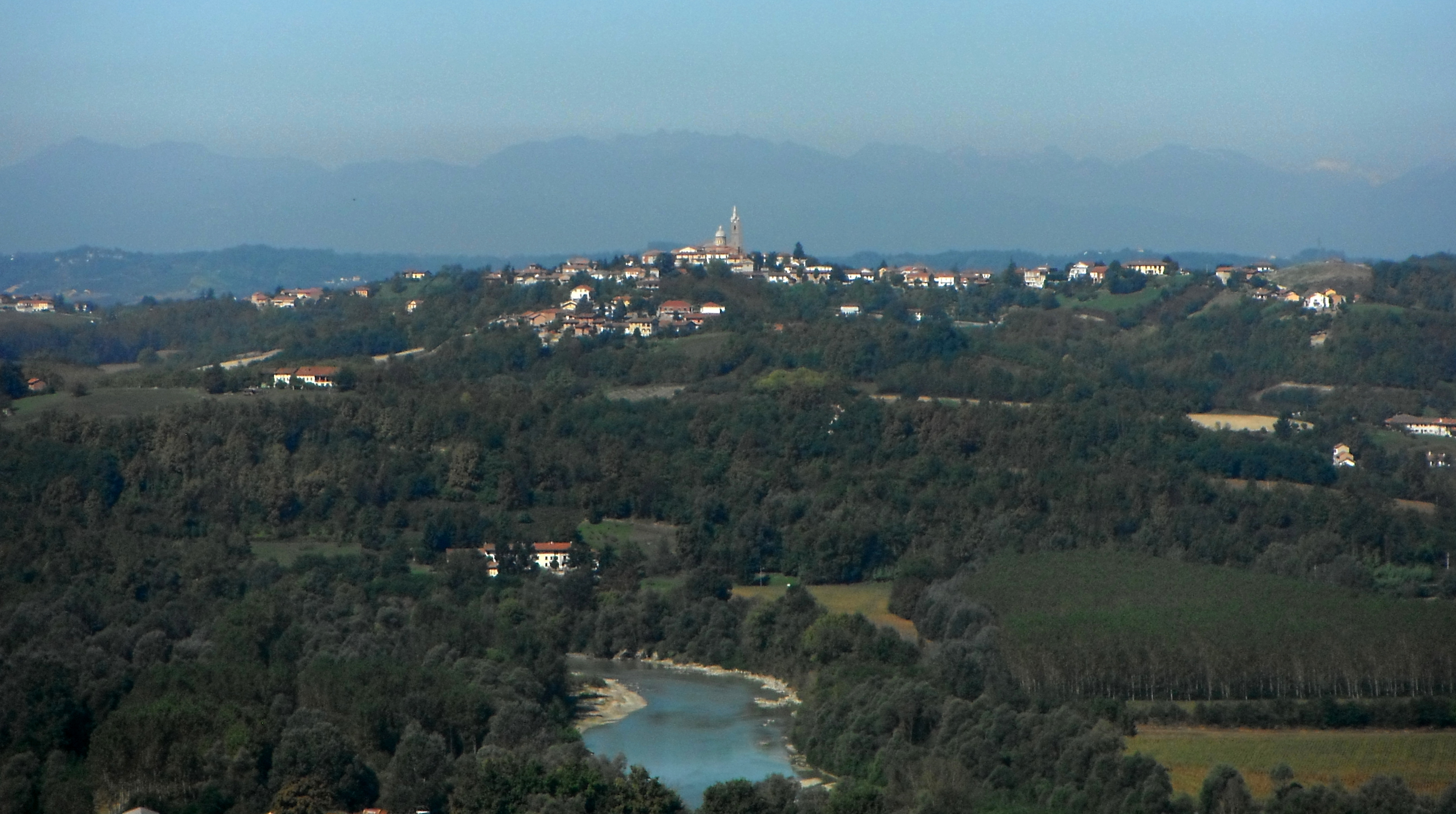
- View of Antignano

- Coat of arms

- Location of Antignano in Italy Antignano (Piedmont)
- Coordinates: 44°51′N 8°8′E
- Country: Italy
- Region: Piedmont
- Province: Asti (AT)
- Frazioni: Perosini, Gonella

Government
  - Mayor: Alessandro Civardi

Area
  - Total: 10.86 km^{2} (4.19 sq mi)
- Elevation: 260 m (850 ft)

Population (30 April 2017)
  - Total: 970
  - Density: 89/km^{2} (230/sq mi)
- Demonym: Antignanesi
- Time zone: UTC+1 (CET)
  - Summer (DST): UTC+2 (CEST)
- Postal code: 14010
- Dialing code: 0141
- Website: Official website

Antignano is a comune (municipality) in the Province of Asti in the Italian region Piedmont, located about 40 kilometres (25 mi) southeast of Turin and about 8 kilometres (5 mi) southwest of Asti.

Antignano borders the following municipalities: Celle Enomondo, Costigliole d'Asti, Isola d'Asti, Revigliasco d'Asti, San Damiano d'Asti, and San Martino Alfieri.
