= San Martino Alfieri =

San Martino Alfieri San Martin
- Comune
- Comune di San Martino Alfieri
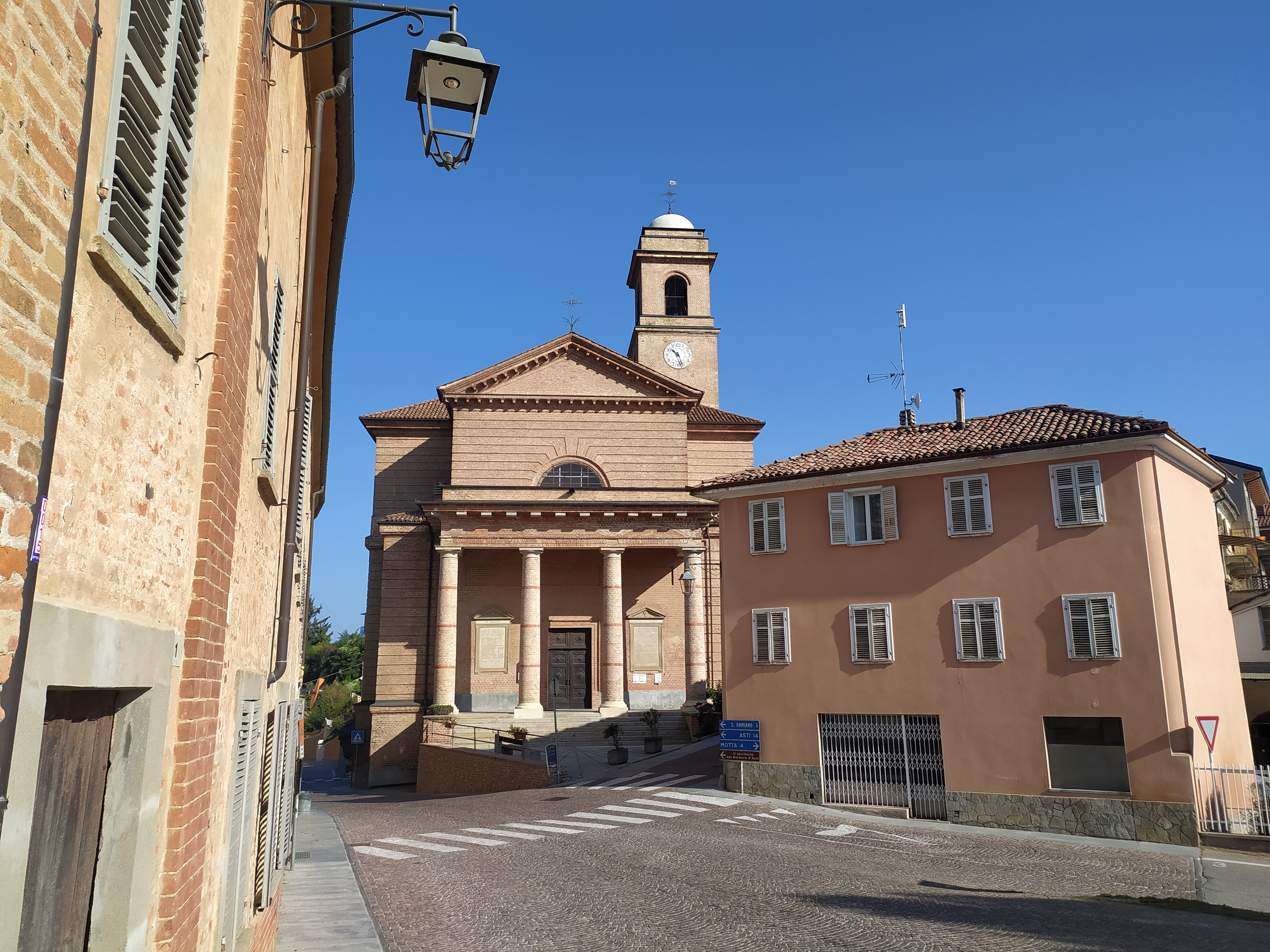

- Coat of arms

- Location within Italy Location within Piedmont
- Coordinates: 44°49′N 8°7′E
- Country: Italy
- Region: Piedmont
- Province: Province of Asti (AT)
- Frazioni: Firano, Saracchi, Quaglia, Marelli, Fagnani

Government
  - Mayor: Michele Ruella

Area
  - Total: 7.4 km^{2} (2.9 sq mi)

Population (31 May 2007)
  - Total: 726
  - Density: 98/km^{2} (250/sq mi)
- Demonym: Sanmartinesi
- Time zone: UTC+1 (CET)
  - Summer (DST): UTC+2 (CEST)
- Postal code: 14010
- Dialing code: 0141
- Website: www.comune.sanmartinoalfieri.at.it

San Martino Alfieri (Piedmontese: San Martin) is a comune (municipality) in the Province of Asti in the Italian region Piedmont, located about 45 kilometres (28 mi) southeast of Turin and about 11 kilometres (7 mi) southwest of Asti.

San Martino Alfieri borders the following municipalities: Antignano, Costigliole d'Asti, Govone, and San Damiano d'Asti.

The town is partially named after Alfieri family.
