= Masio =

- Comune
- Comune di Masio
- Coat of arms

- Location within Italy Location within Piedmont
- Coordinates: 44°52′N 8°24′E
- Country: Italy
- Region: Piedmont
- Province: Alessandria (AL)
- Frazioni: Abazia

Government
  - Mayor: Pio Giuseppe Perfumo

Area
  - Total: 22.3 km^{2} (8.6 sq mi)
- Elevation: 142 m (466 ft)

Population (2005)
  - Total: 1,481
  - Density: 66.4/km^{2} (172/sq mi)
- Demonym: Masiesi
- Time zone: UTC+1 (CET)
  - Summer (DST): UTC+2 (CEST)
- Postal code: 15024
- Dialing code: 0131
- Website: Official website

Masio (Mas in Piedmontese) is a comune (municipality) in the Province of Alessandria in the Italian region Piedmont, located about 60 kilometres (37 mi) southeast of Turin and about 20 kilometres (12 mi) southwest of Alessandria.

Masio borders the following municipalities: Cerro Tanaro, Cortiglione, Felizzano, Incisa Scapaccino, Oviglio, Quattordio, and Rocchetta Tanaro.
