= Montaldo Scarampi =

- Comune
- Comune di Montaldo Scarampi
- Location within Italy Location within Piedmont
- Coordinates: 44°50′N 8°16′E
- Country: Italy
- Region: Piedmont
- Province: Province of Asti (AT)

Area
  - Total: 6.7 km^{2} (2.6 sq mi)

Population (Dec. 2004)
  - Total: 704
  - Density: 110/km^{2} (270/sq mi)
- Time zone: UTC+1 (CET)
  - Summer (DST): UTC+2 (CEST)
- Postal code: 14040
- Dialing code: 0141

Montaldo Scarampi is a comune (municipality) in the Province of Asti in the Italian region Piedmont, located about 50 kilometres (31 mi) southeast of Turin and about 9 kilometres (6 mi) southeast of Asti. As of 31 December 2004, it had a population of 704 and an area of 6.7 square kilometres (2.6 mi^{2}).

Montaldo Scarampi borders the following municipalities: Mombercelli, Montegrosso d'Asti, and Rocca d'Arazzo.

== Demographic evolution ==
Historical population

Year	Pop.	±%
1861	1,383	—
1871	1,453	+5.1%
1881	1,644	+13.1%
1901	1,915	+16.5%
1911	1,914	−0.1%

Year	Pop.	±%
1921	1,752	−8.5%
1931	1,578	−9.9%
1936	1,483	−6.0%
1951	1,270	−14.4%
1961	1,017	−19.9%

Year	Pop.	±%
1971	781	−23.2%
1981	689	−11.8%
1991	605	−12.2%
2001	688	+13.7%

Source: Data from ISTAT
