= Revigliasco d'Asti =

- Comune
- Comune di Revigliasco d'Asti
- Location within Italy Location within Piedmont
- Coordinates: 44°51′N 8°9′E
- Country: Italy
- Region: Piedmont
- Province: Asti (AT)
- Frazioni: Bricco Novara, Castellero, Valle Mongogno, Bricco Manina, Salairolo

Government
  - Mayor: Giuseppe Contorno

Area
  - Total: 8.9 km^{2} (3.4 sq mi)
- Elevation: 203 m (666 ft)

Population (31 December 2014)
  - Total: 781
  - Density: 88/km^{2} (230/sq mi)
- Demonym: Revigliaschesi
- Time zone: UTC+1 (CET)
  - Summer (DST): UTC+2 (CEST)
- Postal code: 14010
- Dialing code: 0141
- Patron saint: St. Anne
- Saint day: 26 July
- Website: Official website

Revigliasco d'Asti is a comune (municipality) in the Province of Asti in the Italian region Piedmont, located about 45 kilometres (28 mi) southeast of Turin and about 6 kilometres (4 mi) southwest of Asti.

Revigliasco d'Asti borders the following municipalities: Antignano, Asti, Celle Enomondo, and Isola d'Asti.

== Twin towns ==
Revigliasco d'Asti is twinned with:

- Garons, France (2000)
