= Francesco Buglio =

Italian football manager

Personal information
- Full name: Francesco Buglio
- Date of birth: 21 May 1957 (age 69)
- Place of birth: Catania, Italy

Team information
- Current team: Livorno (manager)

Youth career
- Varese

Senior career*
Years	Team	Apps	(Gls)
1974–1975	Varese	1	(0)
1976–1977	Salernitana	6	(0)
- Viareggio

Managerial career
- 1984–1986: Bozzano
- 1986–1987: Viareggio
- 1987–1988: Pistoiese
- 1988–1989: Seravezza
- 1989–1990: Ninfea Torrelaghese
- 1990–1993: Massarosa
- 1993–1995: Forte Dei Marmi
- 1995–1998: Viareggio
- 1998–1999: Saronno
- 1999–2000: Rondinella
- 2001–2003: Aglianese
- 2003–2004: Valenzana
- 2004–2006: San Marino
- 2006–2007: Ivrea
- 2007–2008: SPAL
- 2008–2009: Poggibonsi
- 2009–2010: Alessandria
- 2010–2012: Casale
- 2014–2016: Acqui Calcio
- 2016–2017: Pavia
- 2017–2018: Real Forte Querceta
- 2018–2021: Casale
- 2021–2022: Livorno
- * Club domestic league appearances and goals

Francesco Buglio (born 21 May 1957) is a football coach.

== Playing career ==
As a footballer, he played shortly in Varese (having his debut in 1974–75 Serie A) and Viareggio youth teams. Ha played also as a forward at Salernitana. He soon retired from active football because of health reasons, then he pursued a coaching career.

== Coaching career ==
For a decade Buglio trained little Tuscany teams, following Marcello Lippi as vice during his experience with A.C. Pistoiese (1987).

In his career he won two Serie D championships with Viareggio and Aglianese and reached a promotion from Serie C2 to Serie C1 with San Marino Calcio.

Lately he trained Alessandria in Lega Pro Prima Divisione; in the same team played his son Angelo Buglio.

On 13 June 2018, he returned to Casale in Serie D.
