= San Damiano d'Asti =

- Comune
- Comune di San Damiano d'Asti
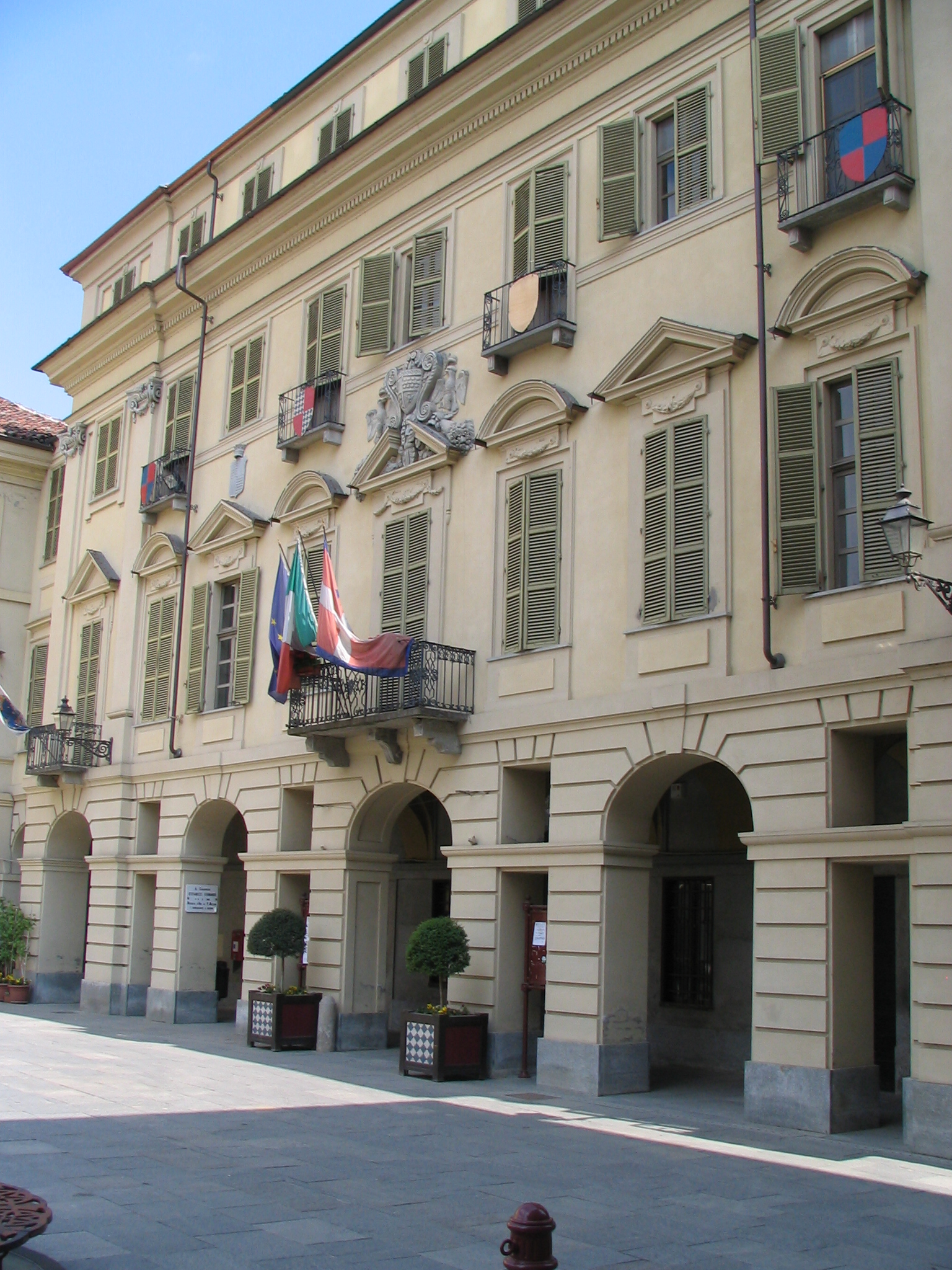

- Coat of arms

- Location within Italy Location within Piedmont
- Coordinates: 44°50′N 8°4′E
- Country: Italy
- Region: Piedmont
- Province: Asti (AT)
- Frazioni: Lavezzole, San Luigi, San Grato, San Giulio, San Pietro, Gorzano, Verneglio, Valmolina, Vascagliana, Torrazzo, Serra dei Costa, Ripalda

Government
  - Mayor: Davide Migliasso

Area
  - Total: 48.0 km^{2} (18.5 sq mi)
- Elevation: 179 m (587 ft)

Population (31 December 2010)
  - Total: 8,342
  - Density: 174/km^{2} (450/sq mi)
- Demonym: Sandamianesi
- Time zone: UTC+1 (CET)
  - Summer (DST): UTC+2 (CEST)
- Postal code: 14015
- Dialing code: 0141
- Patron saint: Saints Cosmas and Damian
- Website: www.comune.sandamiano.at.it/en

San Damiano d'Asti (Piedmontese: San Damian) is a comune (municipality) in the Province of Asti in the Italian region Piedmont, located about 40 kilometres (25 mi) southeast of Turin and about 13 kilometres (8 mi) southwest of Asti.

== History ==
The area of the municipality was once occupied in the Middle Ages by the commune of Axtizio and its suburbs of Gorzano, Lavezzole and Marcelengo. In 1275, after losing the war against Asti, Astixio was destroyed. The Astigiani built in its place a new town, called San Damiano d'Asti.

== Climate ==
Climate data for San Damiano d'Asti
Month	Jan	Feb	Mar	Apr	May	Jun	Jul	Aug	Sep	Oct	Nov	Dec	Year
Mean daily maximum °C (°F)	3 (37)	5 (41)	10 (50)	14 (57)	19 (66)	23 (73)	25 (77)	24 (75)	21 (69)	15 (59)	8 (46)	4 (39)	14 (57)
Mean daily minimum °C (°F)	0 (32)	1 (33)	4 (39)	7 (44)	11 (51)	15 (59)	17 (62)	17 (62)	14 (57)	9 (48)	4 (39)	0 (32)	8 (46)
Average precipitation cm (inches)	2.4 (1)	4 (1.6)	5.3 (2.1)	5.9 (2.3)	6.4 (2.5)	3.7 (1.5)	2.2 (0.9)	4.2 (1.7)	3.6 (1.4)	6.2 (2.4)	5.5 (2.2)	3.3 (1.3)	52.7 (20.7)
Source: Weatherbase

== Twin towns ==
San Damiano is twinned with:

- Kriens, Switzerland
