= List of municipalities of the Province of Alessandria =

The following is a list of the 187 municipalities (comuni) of the Province of Alessandria in the region of Piedmont in Italy.

== List ==
Municipality	Population (2026)	Area (km^{2})	Density
Acqui Terme	19,017	33.30	571.1
Albera Ligure	292	21.23	13.8
Alessandria	93,409	203.57	458.9
Alfiano Natta	655	13.16	49.8
Alice Bel Colle	632	12.21	51.8
Alluvioni Piovera	1,564	24.79	63.1
Altavilla Monferrato	386	11.33	34.1
Alzano Scrivia	354	2.13	166.2
Arquata Scrivia	6,335	29.24	216.7
Avolasca	241	12.24	19.7
Balzola	1,252	16.62	75.3
Basaluzzo	2,009	15.05	133.5
Bassignana	1,574	28.71	54.8
Belforte Monferrato	486	8.33	58.3
Bergamasco	662	13.44	49.3
Berzano di Tortona	163	2.89	56.4
Bistagno	1,692	17.59	96.2
Borghetto di Borbera	1,889	39.40	47.9
Borgo San Martino	1,333	9.72	137.1
Borgoratto Alessandrino	534	6.60	80.9
Bosco Marengo	2,140	44.53	48.1
Bosio	1,037	67.61	15.3
Bozzole	343	9.02	38.0
Brignano-Frascata	420	17.53	24.0
Cabella Ligure	437	46.63	9.4
Camagna Monferrato	464	9.25	50.2
Camino	730	18.44	39.6
Cantalupo Ligure	431	24.06	17.9
Capriata d'Orba	1,776	28.47	62.4
Carbonara Scrivia	1,114	5.05	220.6
Carentino	311	9.79	31.8
Carezzano	437	10.48	41.7
Carpeneto	848	13.34	63.6
Carrega Ligure	76	55.26	1.4
Carrosio	519	6.92	75.0
Cartosio	711	16.34	43.5
Casal Cermelli	1,189	12.16	97.8
Casale Monferrato	32,461	86.21	376.5
Casaleggio Boiro	335	12.01	27.9
Casalnoceto	945	12.98	72.8
Casasco	134	9.04	14.8
Cassano Spinola	1,796	17.13	104.8
Cassine	2,811	33.09	85.0
Cassinelle	845	23.77	35.5
Castellania Coppi	85	7.21	11.8
Castellar Guidobono	429	2.48	173.0
Castellazzo Bormida	4,519	45.13	100.1
Castelletto d'Erro	115	4.66	24.7
Castelletto d'Orba	1,811	13.98	129.5
Castelletto Merli	445	11.59	38.4
Castelletto Monferrato	1,439	9.58	150.2
Castelnuovo Bormida	636	13.11	48.5
Castelnuovo Scrivia	4,807	45.42	105.8
Castelspina	391	5.49	71.2
Cavatore	248	10.45	23.7
Cella Monte	446	5.55	80.4
Cereseto	355	10.44	34.0
Cerreto Grue	293	4.75	61.7
Cerrina Monferrato	1,264	17.30	73.1
Coniolo	420	10.30	40.8
Conzano	892	11.61	76.8
Costa Vescovato	310	7.90	39.2
Cremolino	1,002	14.39	69.6
Denice	161	7.46	21.6
Dernice	174	18.28	9.5
Fabbrica Curone	530	53.84	9.8
Felizzano	2,066	25.01	82.6
Fraconalto	307	17.62	17.4
Francavilla Bisio	491	7.75	63.4
Frascaro	425	5.29	80.3
Frassinello Monferrato	449	8.43	53.3
Frassineto Po	1,349	29.57	45.6
Fresonara	651	6.93	93.9
Frugarolo	1,882	27.06	69.5
Fubine	1,604	25.53	62.8
Gabiano	1,033	17.77	58.1
Gamalero	783	12.15	64.4
Garbagna	638	20.72	30.8
Gavi	4,344	45.04	96.4
Giarole	682	5.45	125.1
Gremiasco	277	17.38	15.9
Grognardo	225	9.08	24.8
Grondona	477	25.94	18.4
Guazzora	288	2.80	102.9
Isola Sant'Antonio	654	23.55	27.8
Lerma	797	14.54	54.8
Lu e Cuccaro Monferrato	1,255	27.10	46.3
Malvicino	79	9.04	8.7
Masio	1,276	22.23	57.4
Melazzo	1,236	19.74	62.6
Merana	172	9.20	18.7
Mirabello Monferrato	1,204	13.24	90.9
Molare	1,984	32.50	61.0
Molino dei Torti	567	2.75	206.2
Mombello Monferrato	890	19.69	45.2
Momperone	200	8.54	23.4
Moncestino	194	6.52	29.8
Mongiardino Ligure	145	29.03	5.0
Monleale	552	9.62	57.4
Montacuto	227	23.75	9.6
Montaldeo	206	5.38	38.3
Montaldo Bormida	576	5.72	100.7
Montecastello	272	7.49	36.3
Montechiaro d'Acqui	509	17.60	28.9
Montegioco	271	5.45	49.7
Montemarzino	312	9.85	31.7
Morano sul Po	1,270	17.71	71.7
Morbello	388	23.95	16.2
Mornese	666	13.22	50.4
Morsasco	593	10.29	57.6
Murisengo	1,210	15.31	79.0
Novi Ligure	27,427	55.20	496.9
Occimiano	1,195	22.46	53.2
Odalengo Grande	397	15.43	25.7
Odalengo Piccolo	207	7.57	27.3
Olivola	105	2.69	39.0
Orsara Bormida	377	5.10	73.9
Ottiglio	532	14.54	36.6
Ovada	10,941	35.37	309.3
Oviglio	1,224	27.37	44.7
Ozzano Monferrato	1,322	15.18	87.1
Paderna	206	4.42	46.6
Pareto	509	41.74	12.2
Parodi Ligure	593	12.54	47.3
Pasturana	1,263	5.28	239.2
Pecetto di Valenza	1,156	11.35	101.9
Pietra Marazzi	850	8.00	106.3
Pomaro Monferrato	329	13.44	24.5
Pontecurone	3,570	29.70	120.2
Pontestura	1,317	18.92	69.6
Ponti	491	11.97	41.0
Ponzano Monferrato	328	11.65	28.2
Ponzone	1,013	69.03	14.7
Pozzol Groppo	311	14.08	22.1
Pozzolo Formigaro	4,558	36.18	126.0
Prasco	501	5.97	83.9
Predosa	1,860	33.01	56.3
Quargnento	1,362	36.17	37.7
Quattordio	1,435	17.73	80.9
Ricaldone	604	10.52	57.4
Rivalta Bormida	1,332	10.05	132.5
Rivarone	400	6.07	65.9
Rocca Grimalda	1,396	15.46	90.3
Roccaforte Ligure	113	20.59	5.5
Rocchetta Ligure	222	10.15	21.9
Rosignano Monferrato	1,387	19.28	71.9
Sala Monferrato	326	7.58	43.0
Sale	3,853	44.92	85.8
San Cristoforo	519	3.57	145.4
San Giorgio Monferrato	1,204	7.12	169.1
San Salvatore Monferrato	4,053	31.69	127.9
San Sebastiano Curone	530	3.89	136.2
Sant'Agata Fossili	337	7.71	43.7
Sardigliano	375	12.74	29.4
Sarezzano	1,096	13.85	79.1
Serralunga di Crea	510	8.84	57.7
Serravalle Scrivia	6,004	15.95	376.4
Sezzadio	1,185	34.32	34.5
Silvano d'Orba	1,839	12.17	151.1
Solero	1,581	22.55	70.1
Solonghello	196	4.95	39.6
Spigno Monferrato	887	54.86	16.2
Spineto Scrivia	356	3.95	90.1
Stazzano	2,259	17.91	126.1
Strevi	1,940	15.29	126.9
Tagliolo Monferrato	1,460	26.21	55.7
Tassarolo	594	7.04	84.4
Terruggia	860	7.27	118.3
Terzo	817	8.80	92.8
Ticineto	1,297	8.09	160.3
Tortona	26,643	98.87	269.5
Treville	263	4.60	57.2
Trisobbio	621	9.22	67.4
Valenza	18,313	48.49	377.7
Valmacca	973	12.29	79.2
Vignale Monferrato	926	18.73	49.4
Vignole Borbera	2,066	8.65	238.8
Viguzzolo	3,094	18.31	169.0
Villadeati	454	14.61	31.1
Villalvernia	846	4.47	189.3
Villamiroglio	283	9.87	28.7
Villanova Monferrato	1,701	16.56	102.7
Villaromagnano	650	6.07	107.1
Visone	1,169	12.56	93.1
Volpedo	1,135	10.48	108.3
Volpeglino	129	3.25	39.7
Voltaggio	649	52.18	12.4

== See also ==
- List of municipalities of Piedmont
- List of municipalities of Italy
