= Rivalta Bormida =

- Comune
- Comune di Rivalta Bormida
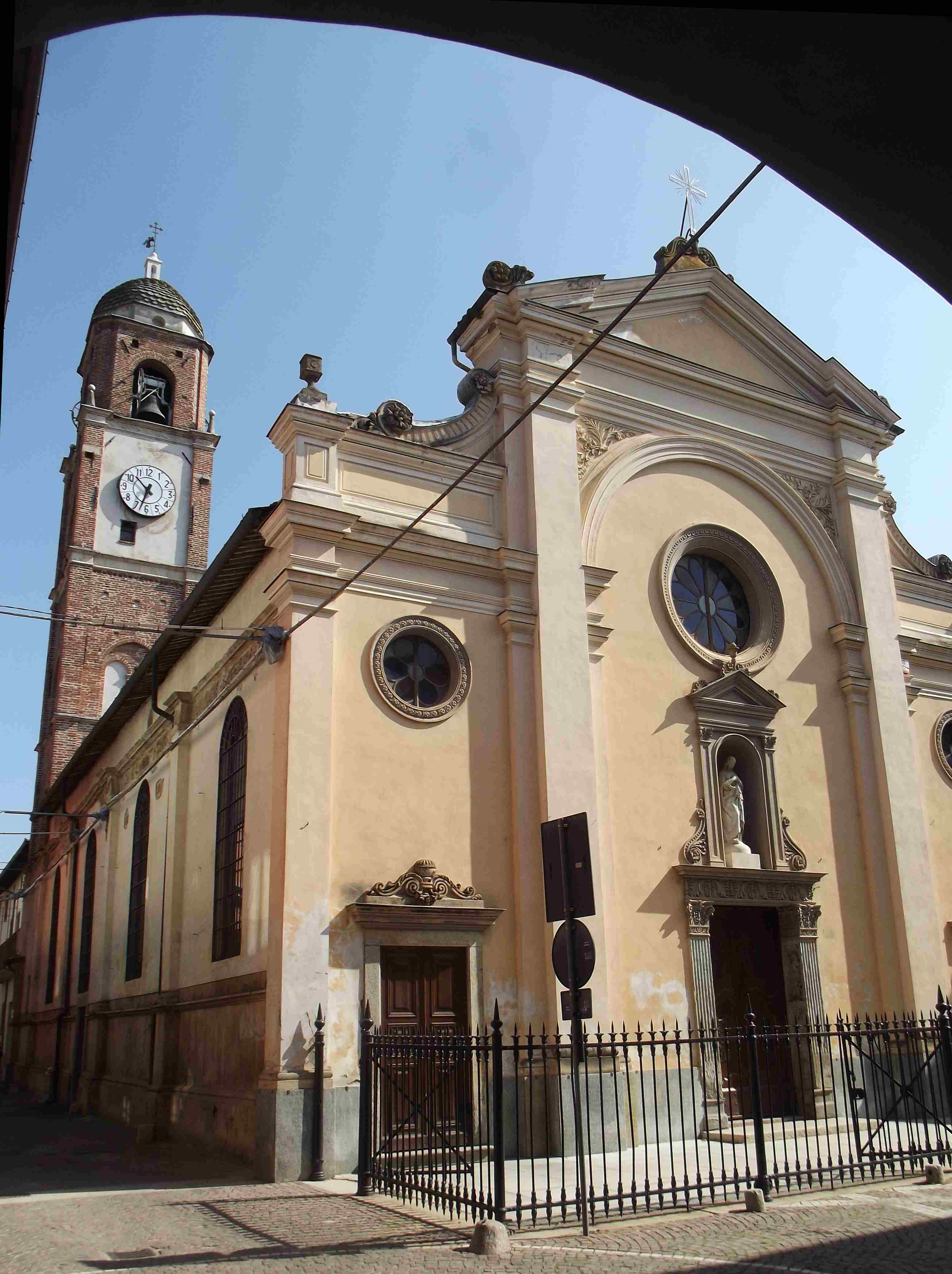

- Coat of arms

- Location within Piedmont Location within Italy
- Coordinates: 44°43′N 8°33′E
- Country: Italy
- Region: Piedmont
- Province: Alessandria (AL)

Government
  - Mayor: Claudio Pronzato

Area
  - Total: 10.05 km^{2} (3.88 sq mi)
- Elevation: 140 m (460 ft)

Population (30 April 2018)
  - Total: 1,417
  - Density: 141.0/km^{2} (365.2/sq mi)
- Demonym: Rivaltesi
- Time zone: UTC+1 (CET)
  - Summer (DST): UTC+2 (CEST)
- Postal code: 15010
- Dialing code: 0144
- Website: Official website

Rivalta Bormida is a comune (municipality) in the Province of Alessandria in the Italian region Piedmont, located about 80 kilometres (50 mi) southeast of Turin and about 25 kilometres (16 mi) south of Alessandria.

Rivalta Bormida borders the following municipalities: Cassine, Castelnuovo Bormida, Montaldo Bormida, Orsara Bormida, Sezzadio, and Strevi.

Rivalta Bormida has a coat of arms composed by a tower in the centre with two bears one on each side sustaining the tower, the ground is represented by a green garden with a silver band representing the Bormida River.
