= Visone =

- Comune
- Comune di Visone
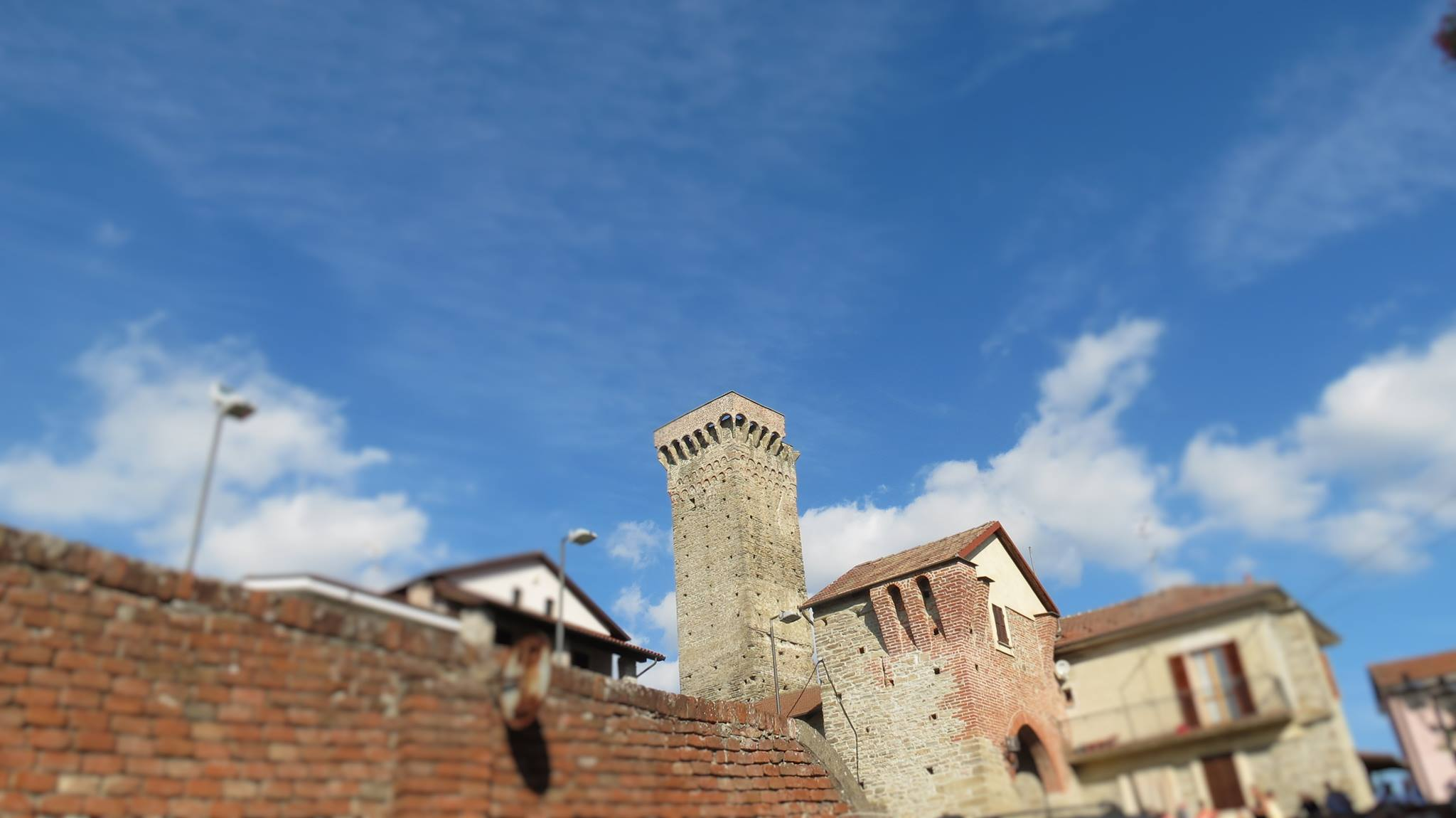
- The entry of the Rock of Visone seen from the eastern bations (15th cent.)

- Location within Italy Location within Piedmont
- Coordinates: 44°40′N 8°30′E
- Country: Italy
- Region: Piedmont
- Province: Alessandria (AL)

Government
  - Mayor: Manuela Delorenzi (lista civica "Nuova Visone")

Area
  - Total: 12.6 km^{2} (4.9 sq mi)
- Elevation: 161 m (528 ft)

Population (December 31, 2010)
  - Total: 1,285
  - Density: 102/km^{2} (264/sq mi)
- Demonym: Visonesi (visuneis)
- Time zone: UTC+1 (CET)
  - Summer (DST): UTC+2 (CEST)
- Postal code: 15010
- Dialing code: 0144
- ISTAT code: 006187
- Patron saint: SS. Peter and Paul
- Saint day: june, 29
- Website: www.comune.visone.al.it

Visone is a comune (municipality) in the Province of Alessandria in the Italian region Piedmont, located about 80 kilometres (50 mi) southeast of Turin and about 30 kilometres (19 mi) southwest of Alessandria. Its name becomes from the homonymous Visone creek, that flows into its territory and enters Bormida river not far from the village.

Visone borders the following municipalities: Acqui Terme, Grognardo, Morbello, Morsasco, Prasco, and Strevi.

== History ==
The first mention of the village of Visone dates back to 4 May 991, when Anselmo, son of Aleramo marquis of Montferrat, and his wife Gisla sign the foundation charter of St. Quentin abbey in Spigno Monferrato. In this period a large number of people of Longobard origin moved to the village. But, some more ancient documents, about fifty years before mention a church placed at the confluence of the Caramagna creek with the Bormida river, into the actual municipal territory of Visone.

At the beginning of the 13th century, a lot of possessions in this country are recognized to Manfredo Boccaccio by the bishop of Acqui. His family will hold those inheritances for almost one century and a half, often in conflict with the bishop's Table on the grounds of the borders.

In October 1450, the Acqui's Cathedral chapter met into the church of St. Mary of Graces in Visone, to elect the new bishop, because there was a terrible plague outbreak in Acqui.

In 1469 the feud moved in the hands of the Malaspina family. In this period the castle is hugely restored by Antoniotto Malaspina. In 1519 Giovanni Malaspina sells the feud to Mary Boverio della Corba, first lady-in-waiting of Anne of Alençon, marquise of Montferrat.

In the middle of the 17th century, Raimond of Cardona, descendant of Mary Boverio, sells the feuds and the castle to the noble Louis Centurione-Scotto, whose family will keep it up to the first half of the 20th century.

On the night of 18-19 April 1861, a flood made a large part of the rock into a landslide, with a consequent collapse of the church of St. Maty of Graces and a lot of houses in the ancient hamlet of Malborghetto.

In 1929 the municipality was suppressed, and joined to the one of Acqui Terme, and it has been restored back starting from 1948, following the liberation.
