= Morsasco =

- Comune
- Comune di Morsasco
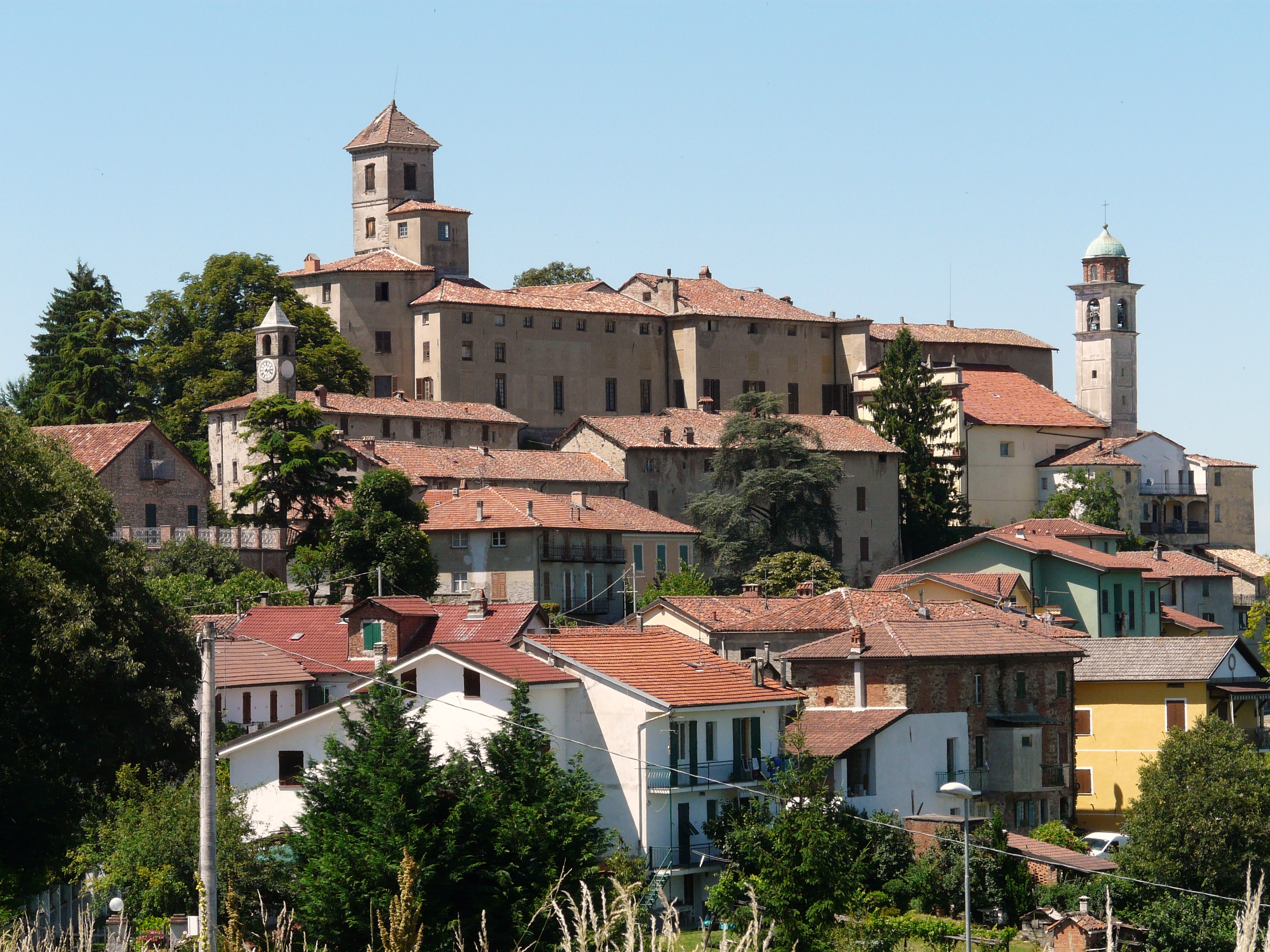

- Location within Italy Location within Piedmont
- Coordinates: 44°40′N 8°33′E
- Country: Italy
- Region: Piedmont
- Province: Province of Alessandria (AL)
- Frazioni: Caramagna

Government
  - Mayor: Luigi Barbero

Area
  - Total: 10.2 km^{2} (3.9 sq mi)
- Elevation: 350 m (1,150 ft)

Population (31 December 2010)
  - Total: 704
  - Density: 69.0/km^{2} (179/sq mi)
- Demonym: Morsaschesi
- Time zone: UTC+1 (CET)
  - Summer (DST): UTC+2 (CEST)
- Postal code: 15010
- Dialing code: 0144
- Website: www.morsasco.com

Morsasco is a comune (municipality) in the Province of Alessandria in the Italian region Piedmont, located about 80 kilometres (50 mi) southeast of Turin and about 30 kilometres (19 mi) south of Alessandria.

Morsasco borders the following municipalities: Cremolino, Orsara Bormida, Prasco, Strevi, Trisobbio, and Visone.
