= Cassine, Piedmont =

Cassine
- Comune
- Comune di Cassine
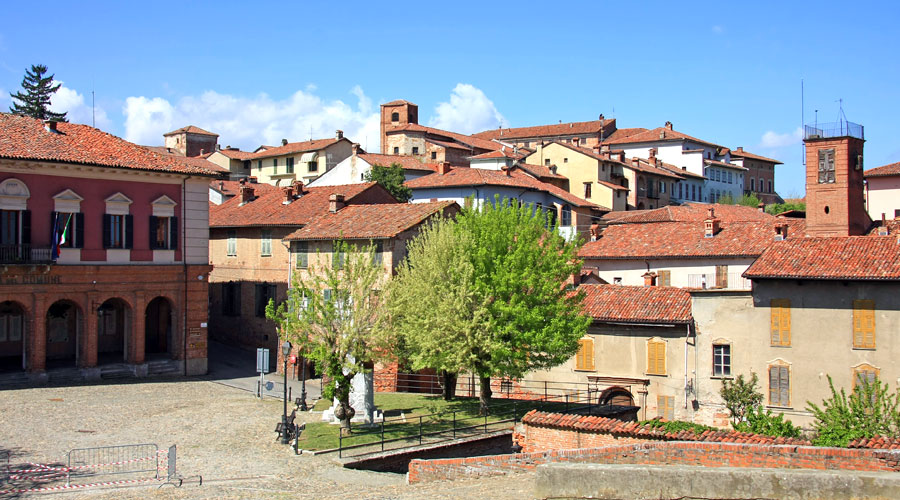

- Coat of arms

- Location within Italy Location within Piedmont
- Coordinates: 44°45′N 8°32′E
- Country: Italy
- Region: Piedmont
- Province: Alessandria (AL)
- Frazioni: Caranzano, Gavonata, Sant'Andrea

Area
  - Total: 33.09 km^{2} (12.78 sq mi)
- Elevation: 190 m (620 ft)

Population (31 August 2017)
  - Total: 2,932
  - Density: 88.61/km^{2} (229.5/sq mi)
- Demonym: Cassinesi
- Time zone: UTC+1 (CET)
  - Summer (DST): UTC+2 (CEST)
- Postal code: 15016
- Dialing code: 0144
- Patron saint: St. James
- Saint day: July 25
- Website: Official website

Cassine (Piedmontese: Cassèine) is a town and commune of the Province of Alessandria in the Italian region Piedmont. It is located 21 kilometres (13 mi) southwest of the town of Alessandria on the left of the lower course of the Bormida in the Alto Monferrato Acquese. The town lies partly in the hills, where the ancient nucleus of the settlement formed, and partly on the plain. Its economic character is agricultural: the hills are rich in vineyards where the wines Moscato d'Asti, Barbera and Freisa are produced as well as grappa.

== Municipal subdivisions and neighbours ==
In addition to the nucleus of Cassine itself (the capoluogo) three frazioni fall within the boundaries of the commune: Caranzano, Gavonata, and Sant'Andrea.

Cassine borders the following communes: Alice Bel Colle, Castelnuovo Bormida, Gamalero, Maranzana, Mombaruzzo, Ricaldone, Rivalta Bormida, Sezzadio, and Strevi.

== History ==
During the 10th century the town was within the domains of the Bishops of Acqui. In 1164, Emperor Frederick I Barbarossa granted it to the Marquis of Montferrat. However, located at the edge of the Ghibelline marquisate, control of Cassine was contested by the Guelfs of Alessandria who conquered and destroyed the town in 1231 and subsequently exacted an annual tribute. In 1404 it was occupied by the condottiere Facino Cane. Subsequently, it was fortified. In 1451 the town was besieged by the Marquis of Montferrat. It was occupied by Charles V, Holy Roman Emperor in 1556, and in 1644 it was taken control of by the French. In 1707 Cassine was annexed to the Kingdom of Sardinia and from that time on its fortunes followed those of other towns in Piedmont.

== Main sights ==
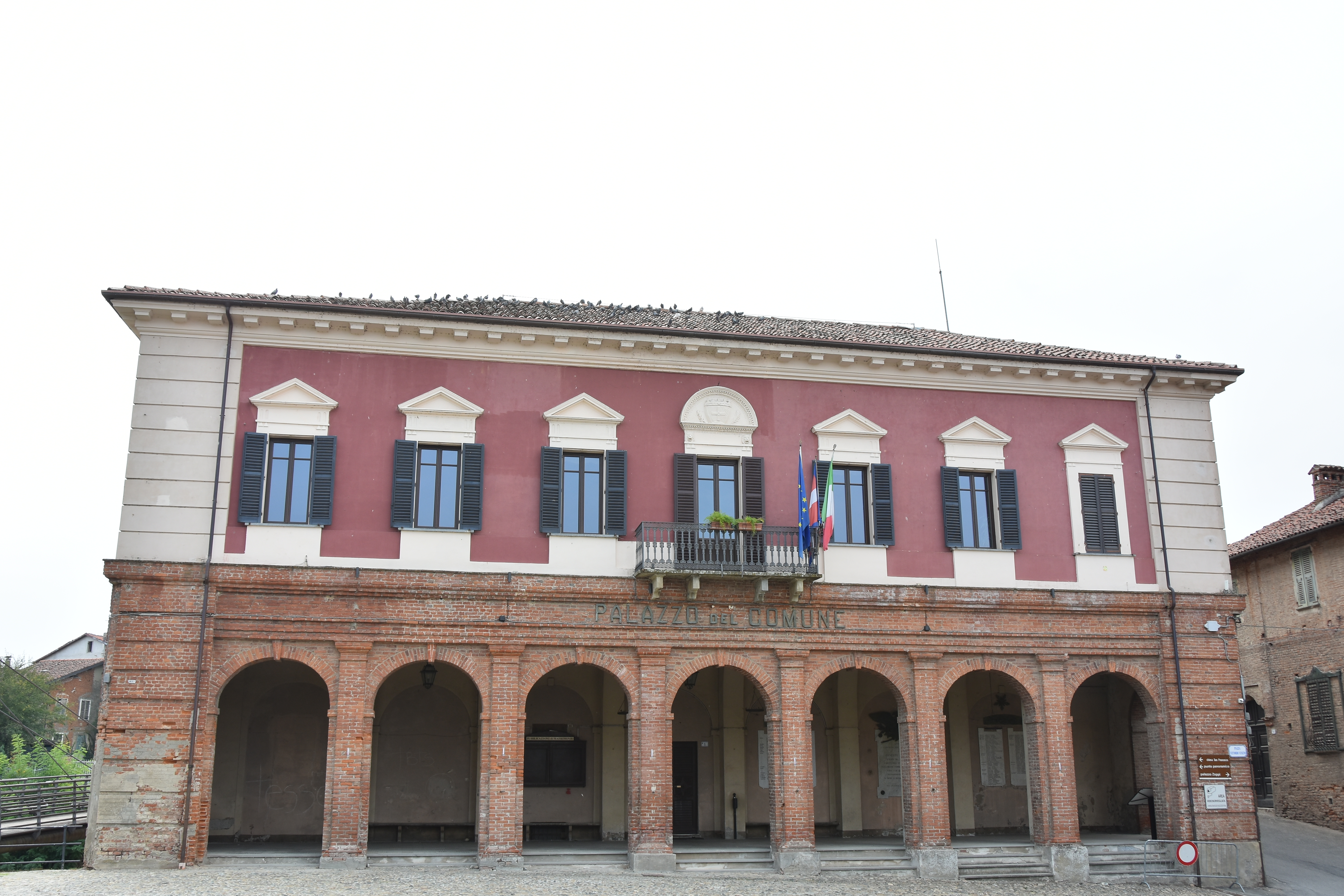
Cassine Town Hall

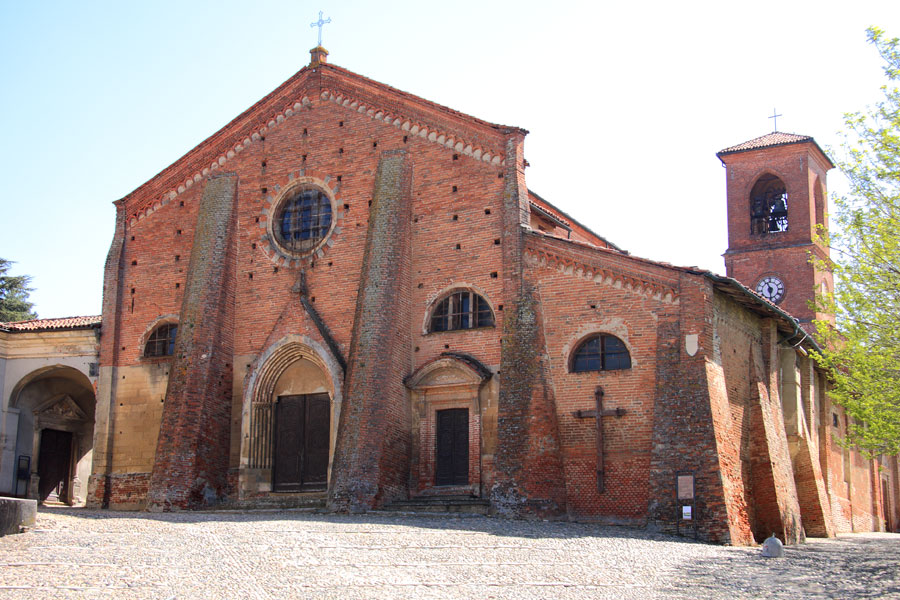
Chiesa San Francesco (St. Francis Church)

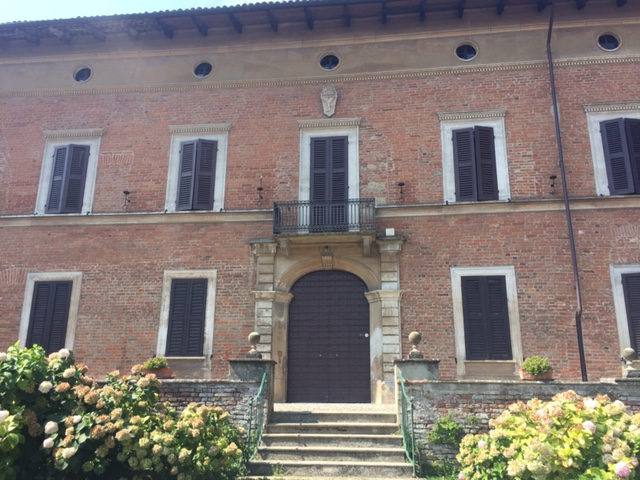
Palazzo Zoppi (Zoppi Palace)

- The church of St. Francis (12th century), in Lombard-Gothic style, has a brickwork façade decorated with arches and two bell towers (one more recent, dating from 1644)
- Palazzo Zoppi (14th century) has 15th-century frescoes in the interior. A chapel in the courtyard houses a notable 14th-century panel from the Piedmontese school.

== People ==
- Saint Bernardino Realino, podestà of Cassine in the mid-16th century.
- Pietro Rava (1916–2006), footballer.
- Luigi Tenco (1938–1967), popular Italian singer, songwriter and actor.

== Sources ==
- Some parts of this article were translated from its counterpart in the Italian Wikipedia, specifically from this version.
