= Orsara Bormida =

- Comune
- Comune di Orsara Bormida
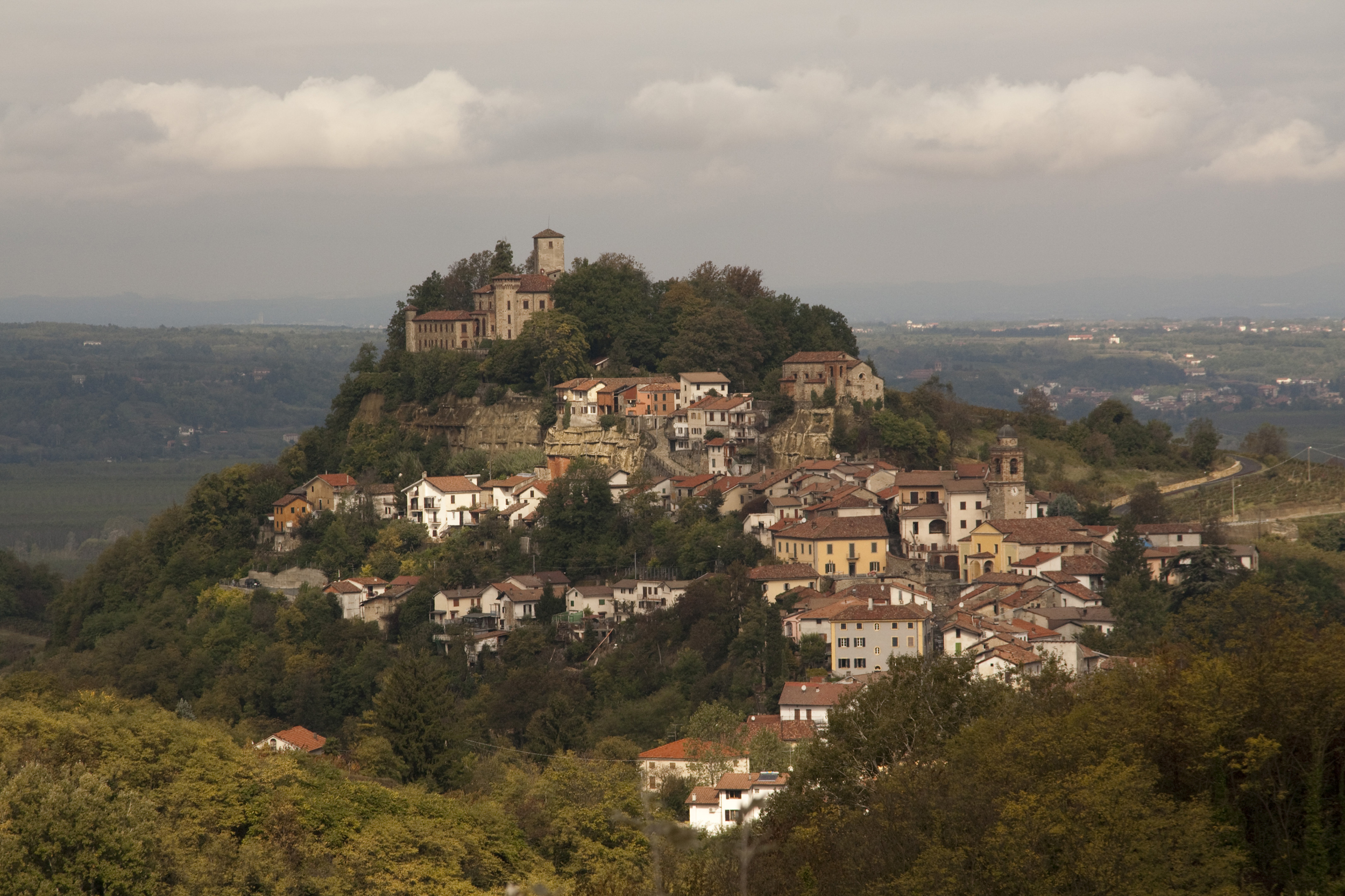
- Coat of arms
- Location within Italy Location within Piedmont
- Coordinates: 44°41′25″N 8°33′45″E
- Country: Italy
- Region: Piedmont
- Province: Alessandria (AL)
- Frazioni: San Quirico, Moglia, Piano, Uvallare

Government
  - Mayor: Stefano Rossi

Area
  - Total: 5.14 km^{2} (1.98 sq mi)
- Elevation: 220 m (720 ft)

Population (30 November 2017)
  - Total: 410
  - Density: 80/km^{2} (210/sq mi)
- Demonym: Orsaresi
- Time zone: UTC+1 (CET)
  - Summer (DST): UTC+2 (CEST)
- Postal code: 15010
- Dialing code: 0144
- Patron saint: St. Martin of Tours
- Saint day: November 11
- Website: Official website

Orsara Bormida is a comune (municipality) in the Province of Alessandria in the Italian region Piedmont, located about 80 kilometres (50 mi) southeast of Turin and about 25 kilometres (16 mi) south of Alessandria, on the right bank of river Bormida.

Orsara Bormida borders the following municipalities: Montaldo Bormida, Morsasco, Rivalta Bormida, Strevi, and Trisobbio. It lies in a territory which was occupied by a forest; only from the 13th century agriculture took possession of the area. It was a fief of the Malaspina family until 1530. It is home to a castle, built in the 11th century.
