= Balzola =

- Comune
- Comune di Balzola
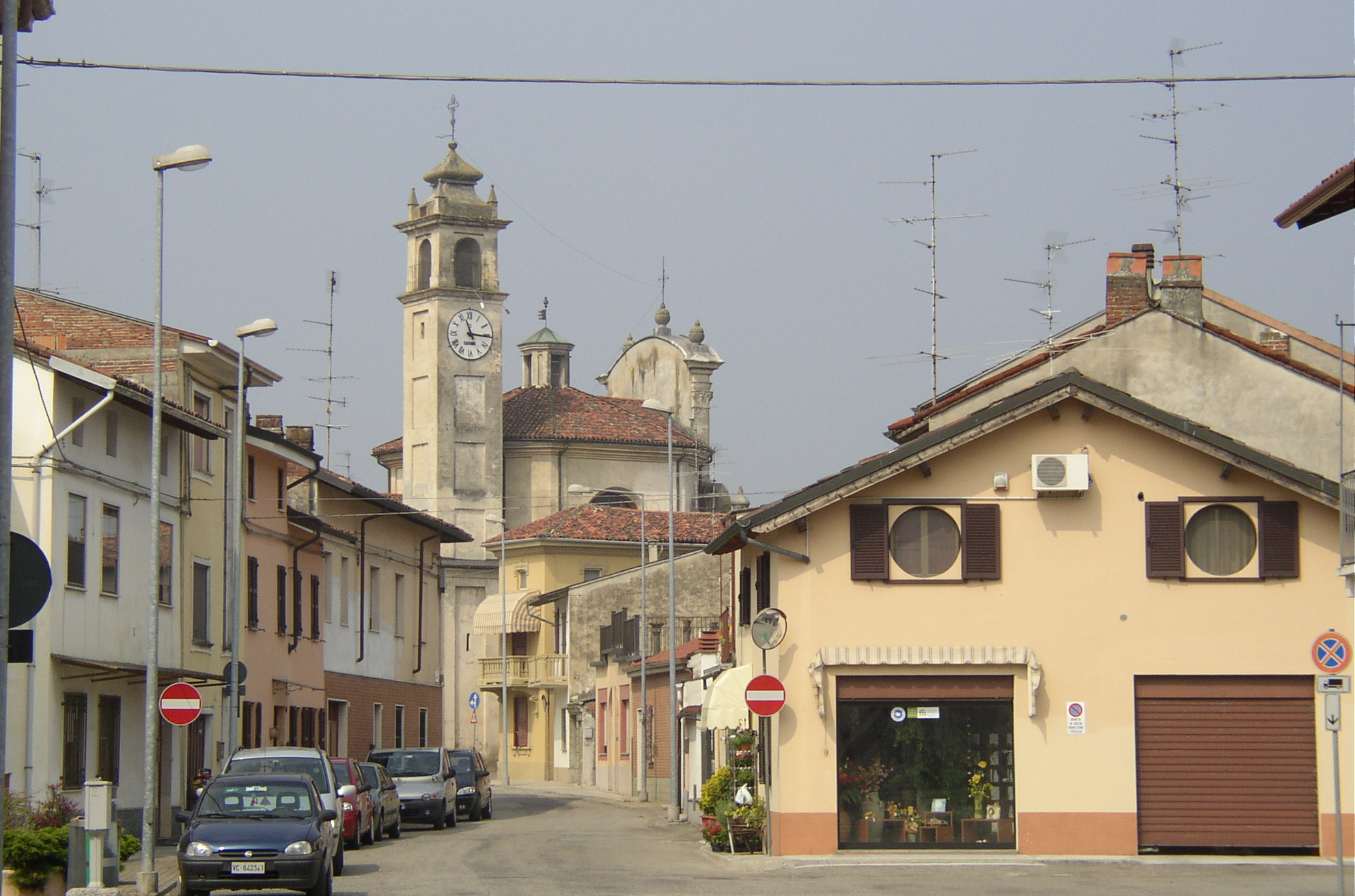

- Coat of arms

- Location within Italy Location within Piedmont
- Coordinates: 45°11′4″N 8°24′16″E
- Country: Italy
- Region: Piedmont
- Province: Alessandria (AL)
- Frazioni: Cantone Borgoratto, Cantone Cascine, Cantone Castelli - Piazza Vignazza, Cantone Giarone, Cantone Pozzarello, Cantone Quadro, Cantone Villa, Cantone Villaveri

Government
  - Mayor: Marco Torriano

Area
  - Total: 16.72 km^{2} (6.46 sq mi)
- Elevation: 119 m (390 ft)

Population (2005)
  - Total: 1,447
  - Density: 86.54/km^{2} (224.1/sq mi)
- Demonym: Balzolesi
- Time zone: UTC+1 (CET)
  - Summer (DST): UTC+2 (CEST)
- Postal code: 15031
- Dialing code: 0142
- Patron saint: St. Roch
- Saint day: 16 August
- Website: Official website

Balzola is a comune (municipality) in the Province of Alessandria in the Italian region Piedmont, located about 60 kilometres (37 mi) east of Turin and about 35 kilometres (22 mi) northwest of Alessandria.
