= Trisobbio =

- Comune
- Comune di Trisobbio
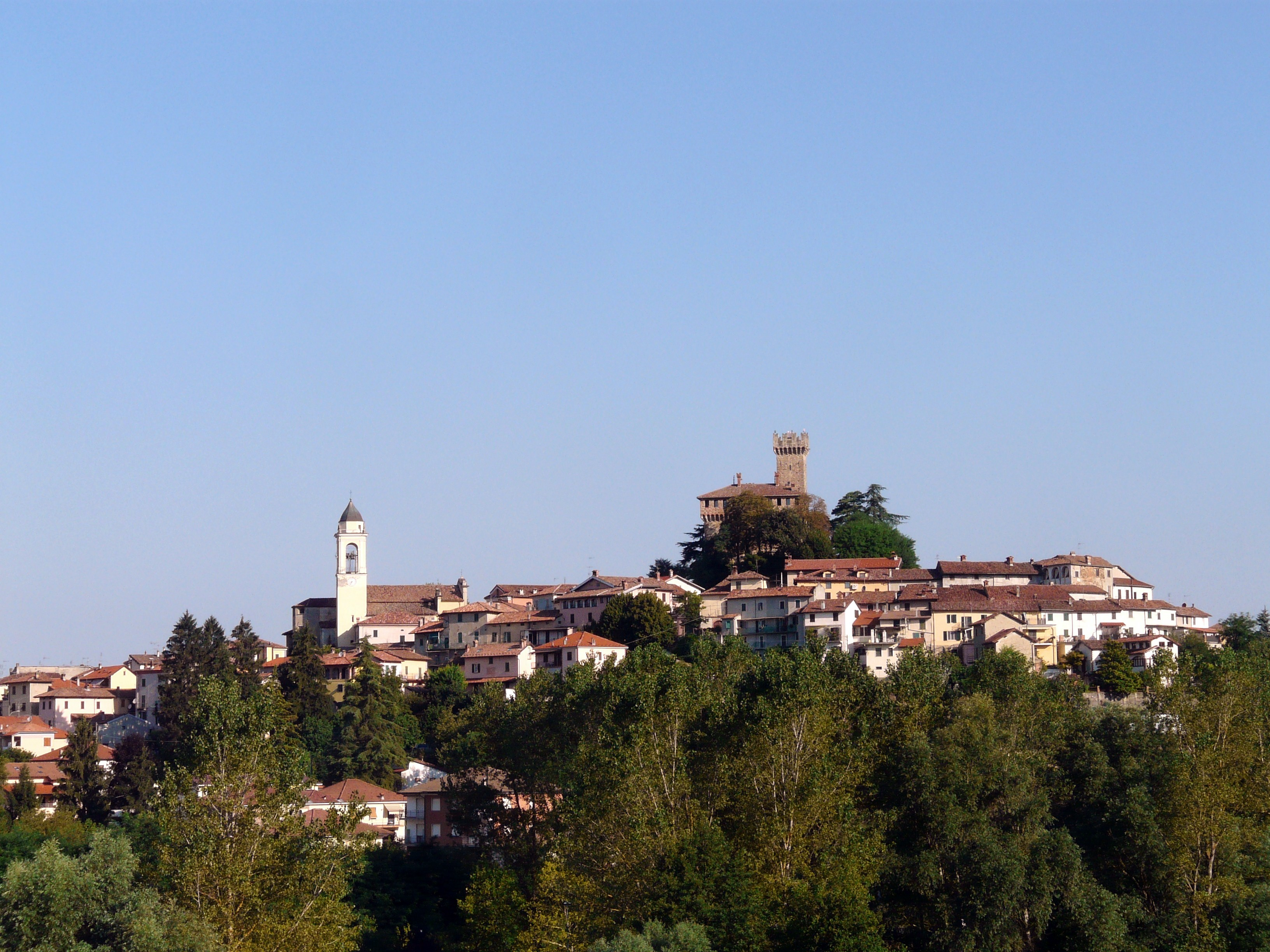

- Location within Italy Location within Piedmont
- Coordinates: 44°40′N 8°35′E
- Country: Italy
- Region: Piedmont
- Province: Alessandria (AL)

Government
  - Mayor: Marco Giovanni Comaschi

Area
  - Total: 9.4 km^{2} (3.6 sq mi)
- Elevation: 341 m (1,119 ft)

Population (31 December 2010)
  - Total: 664
  - Density: 71/km^{2} (180/sq mi)
- Demonym: Trisobbiesi
- Time zone: UTC+1 (CET)
  - Summer (DST): UTC+2 (CEST)
- Postal code: 15070
- Dialing code: 0143

Trisobbio is a comune (municipality) in the Province of Alessandria in the Italian region Piedmont, located about 80 kilometres (50 mi) southeast of Turin and about 30 kilometres (19 mi) south of Alessandria.

Trisobbio borders the following municipalities: Carpeneto, Cremolino, Montaldo Bormida, Morsasco, Orsara Bormida, Ovada, and Rocca Grimalda.

== Main sights ==
- Castle, existing from as early as the 13th century
- Parish church of Nostra Signora Assunta, known from the late 14th century
- Communal Palace, of medieval origins
