= Cremolino =

- Comune
- Comune di Cremolino
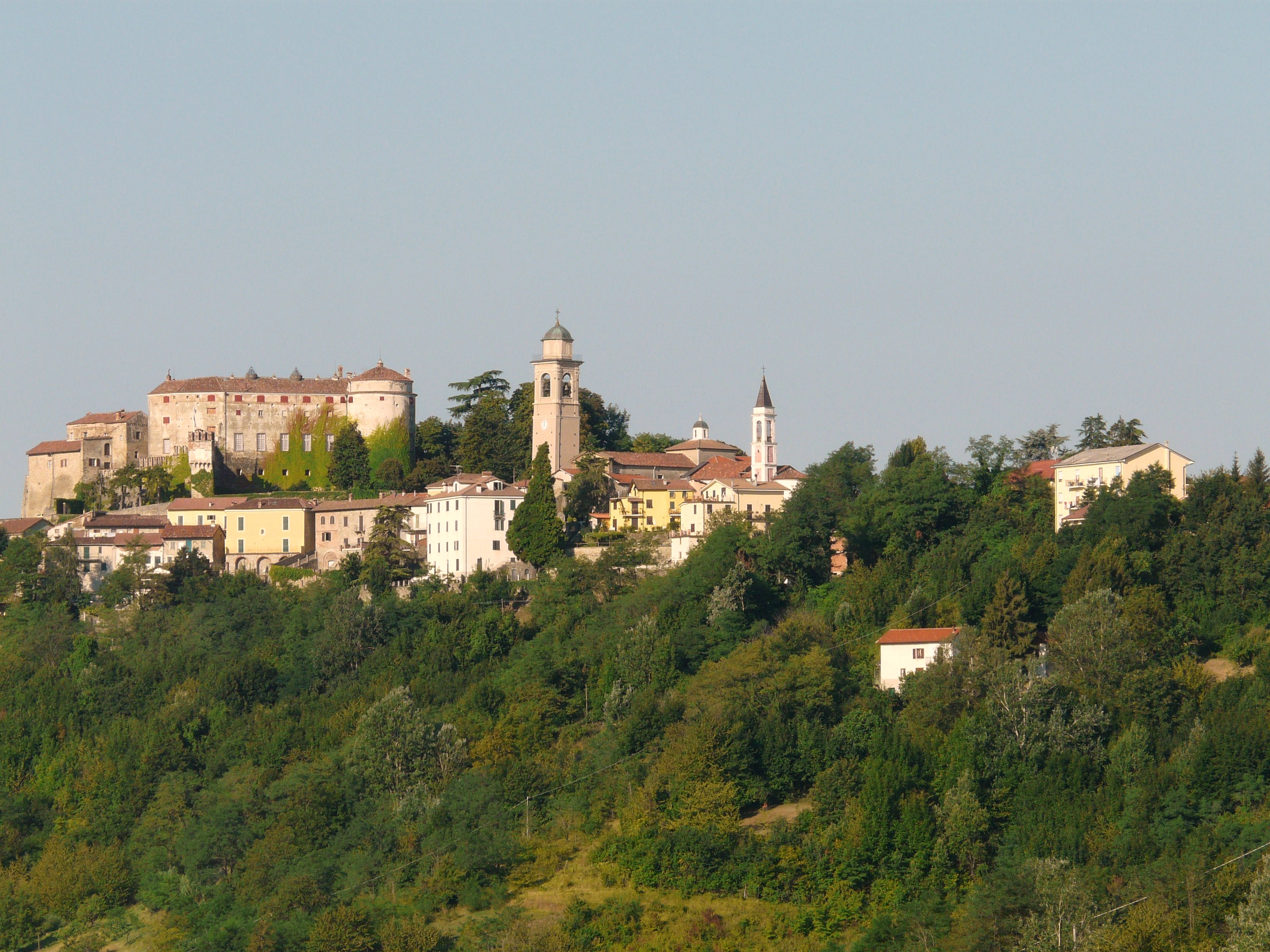

- Location within Italy Location within Piedmont
- Coordinates: 44°37′N 8°36′E
- Country: Italy
- Region: Piedmont
- Province: Alessandria (AL)

Government
  - Mayor: Mauro Beretta

Area
  - Total: 14.4 km^{2} (5.6 sq mi)
- Elevation: 405 m (1,329 ft)

Population (31 December 2010)
  - Total: 1,099
  - Density: 76.3/km^{2} (198/sq mi)
- Demonym: Cremolinesi
- Time zone: UTC+1 (CET)
  - Summer (DST): UTC+2 (CEST)
- Postal code: 15010
- Dialing code: 0143
- Website: Official website

Cremolino is a comune (municipality) in the Province of Alessandria in the Italian region Piedmont, located about 90 kilometres (56 mi) southeast of Turin and about 35 kilometres (22 mi) south of Alessandria.

Cremolino borders the following municipalities: Cassinelle, Molare, Morbello, Morsasco, Ovada, Prasco, and Trisobbio.
