= Province of Alessandria =

Province of Italy, located in the Piedmont region

Coordinates: 44°54′48″N 8°37′12″E

Province of Alessandria Provincia di Alessandria (Italian) Provincia ëd Lissandria (Piedmontese)
- Province
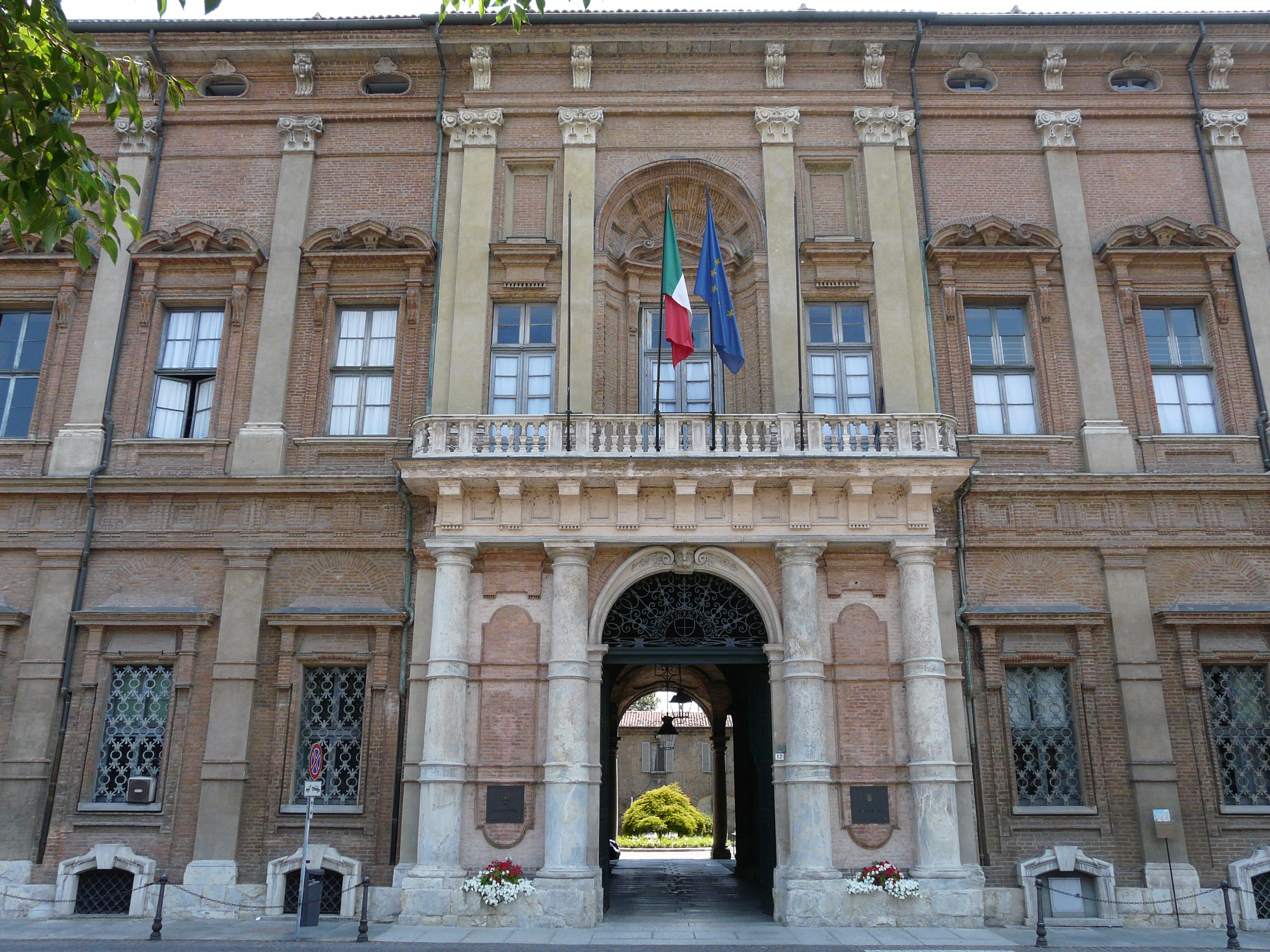
- Palazzo Ghilini, seat of the province of Alessandria.

- Flag Coat of arms

- Location of the Province of Alessandria within Italy
- Country: Italy
- Region: Piedmont
- Capital(s): Alessandria
- Municipalities: 187

Government
  - President: Luigi Benzi

Area
  - Total: 3,558.83 km^{2} (1,374.07 sq mi)

Population (2026)
  - Total: 408,063
  - Density: 114.662/km^{2} (296.974/sq mi)

GDP
  - Total: €11.722 billion (2015)
  - Per capita: €27,238 (2015)
- Time zone: UTC+1 (CET)
  - Summer (DST): UTC+2 (CEST)
- Postal code: 15010-15013, 15015-15018, 15020-15036, 15038-15046, 15048-15053, 15055-15079, 15100
- Telephone prefix: 010, 019, 0131, 0141, 0142, 0143, 0144
- Vehicle registration: AL
- ISTAT code: 06

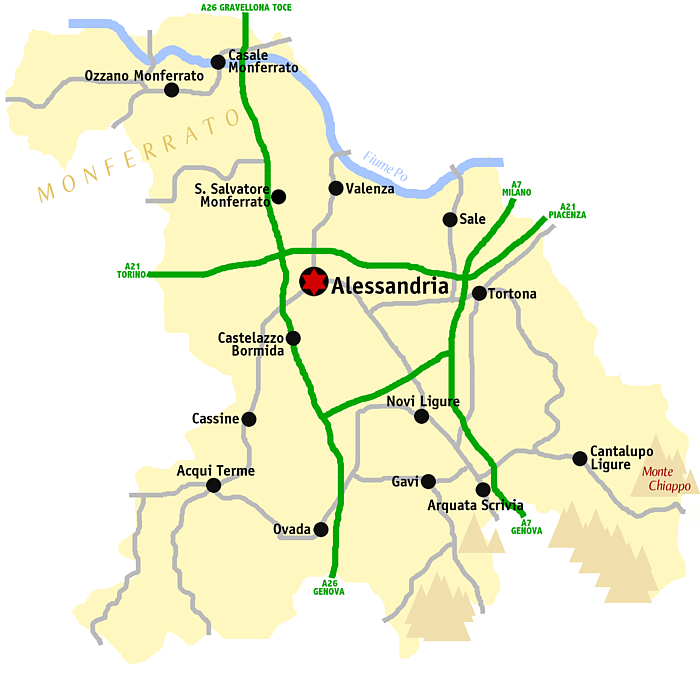
Cities, towns and roads of the province

Map of the municipalities of the province

The province of Alessandria (Italian: provincia di Alessandria; Piedmontese: provincia ëd Lissandria; in Piedmontese of Alessandria: provinsa ëd Lissändria) is a province of the region of Piedmont in Italy. The capital is the city of Alessandria. It has a population of 408,063 across its 187 municipalities.

With an area of 3,558.83 square kilometres (1,374.07 mi^{2}) it is the third largest province of Piedmont after the province of Cuneo and the Metropolitan City of Turin. To the north it borders on the province of Vercelli and to the west on the Metropolitan City of Turin and the province of Asti. It shares its southern border with Liguria (province of Savona and the Metropolitan City of Genoa). Its south-east corner touches the Province of Piacenza in Emilia-Romagna, while to the east it borders on the Lombard province of Pavia.

== History ==
The province was created by Royal Decree n. 3702 of 23 October 1859, the Legge Rattazzi, as a union of five of the six provinces which had formed the Division of Alessandria (the provinces of Alessandria, Acqui, Asti, Casale and Tortona) plus the province of Novi which had formed part of the Division of Genoa. In 1935 the area of Asti was established as the separate Province of Asti.

== Government ==
=== Municipalities ===
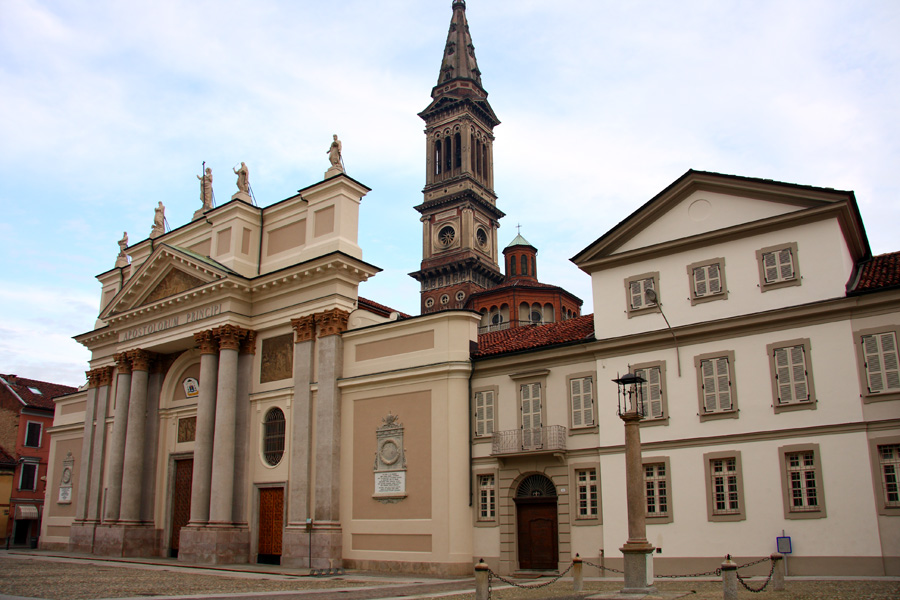
Alessandria

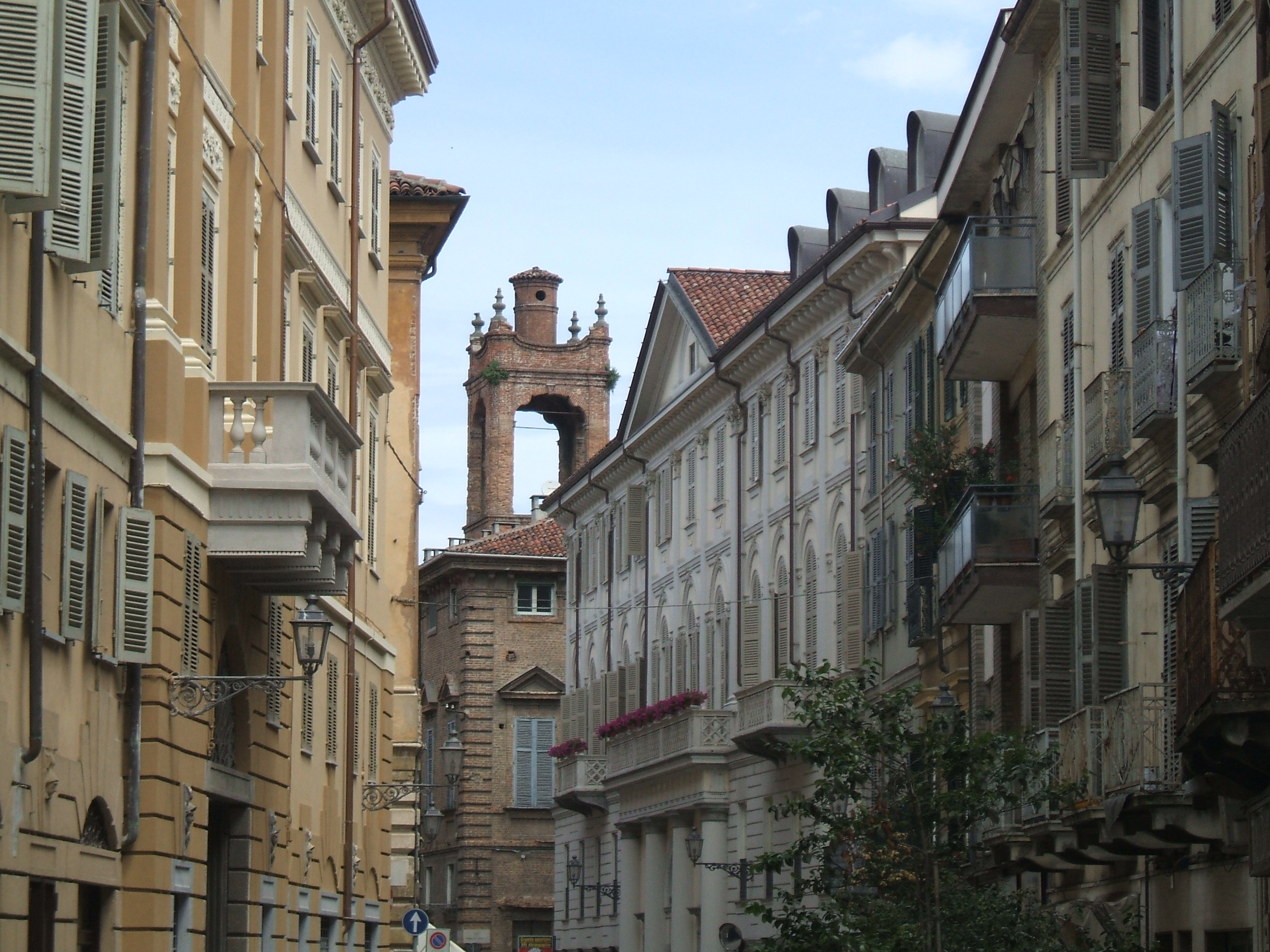
Casale Monferrato

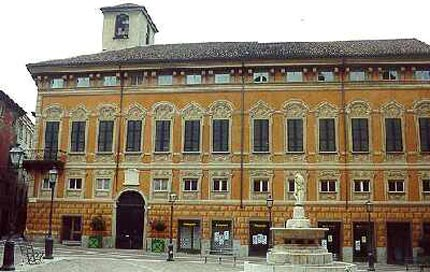
Novi Ligure

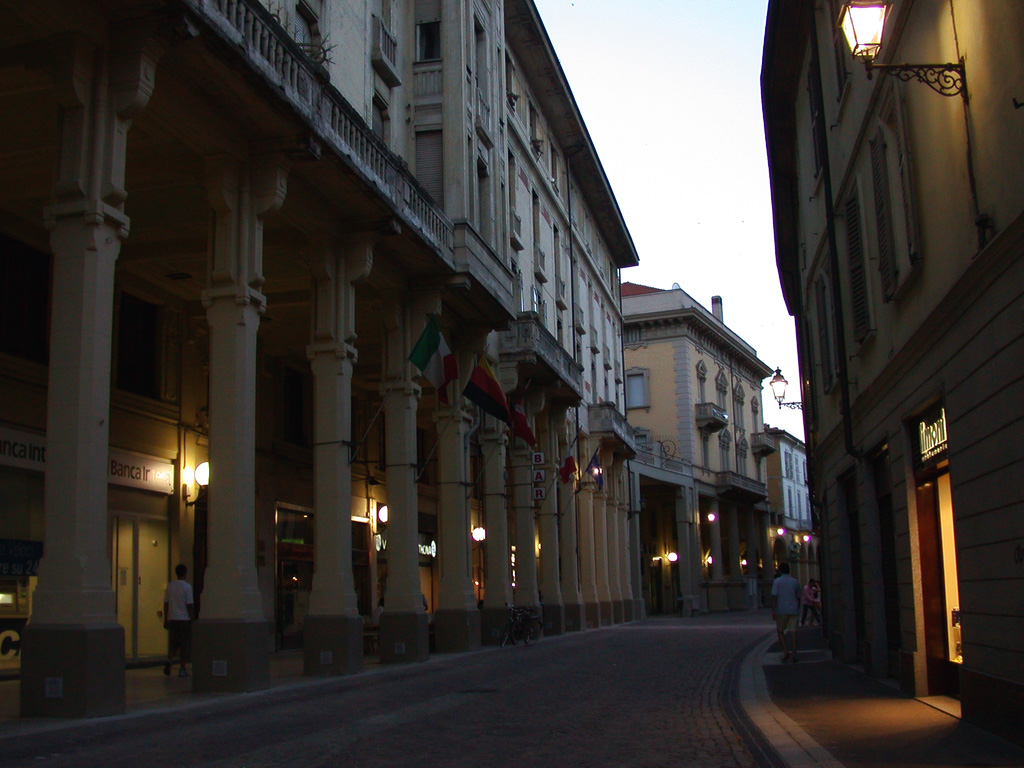
Tortona

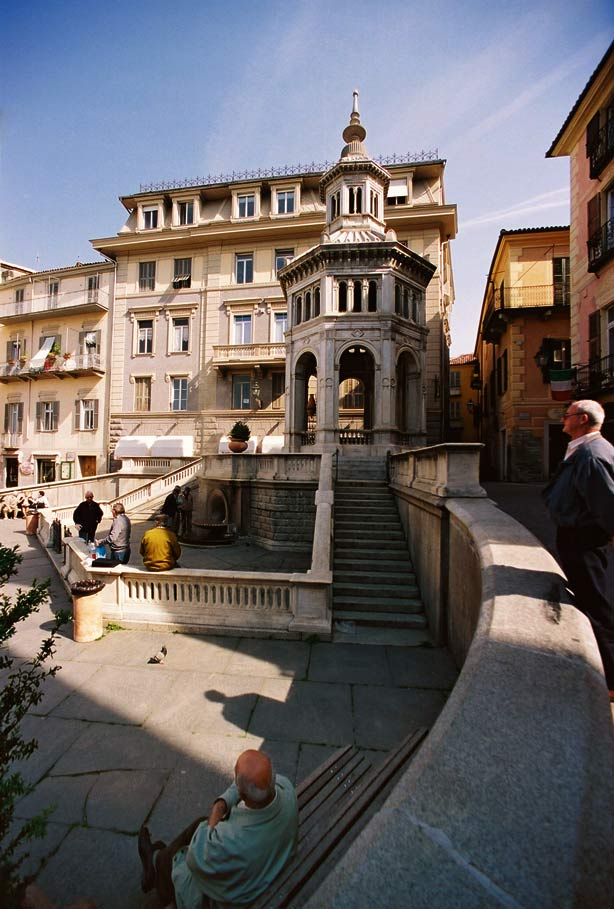
Acqui Terme

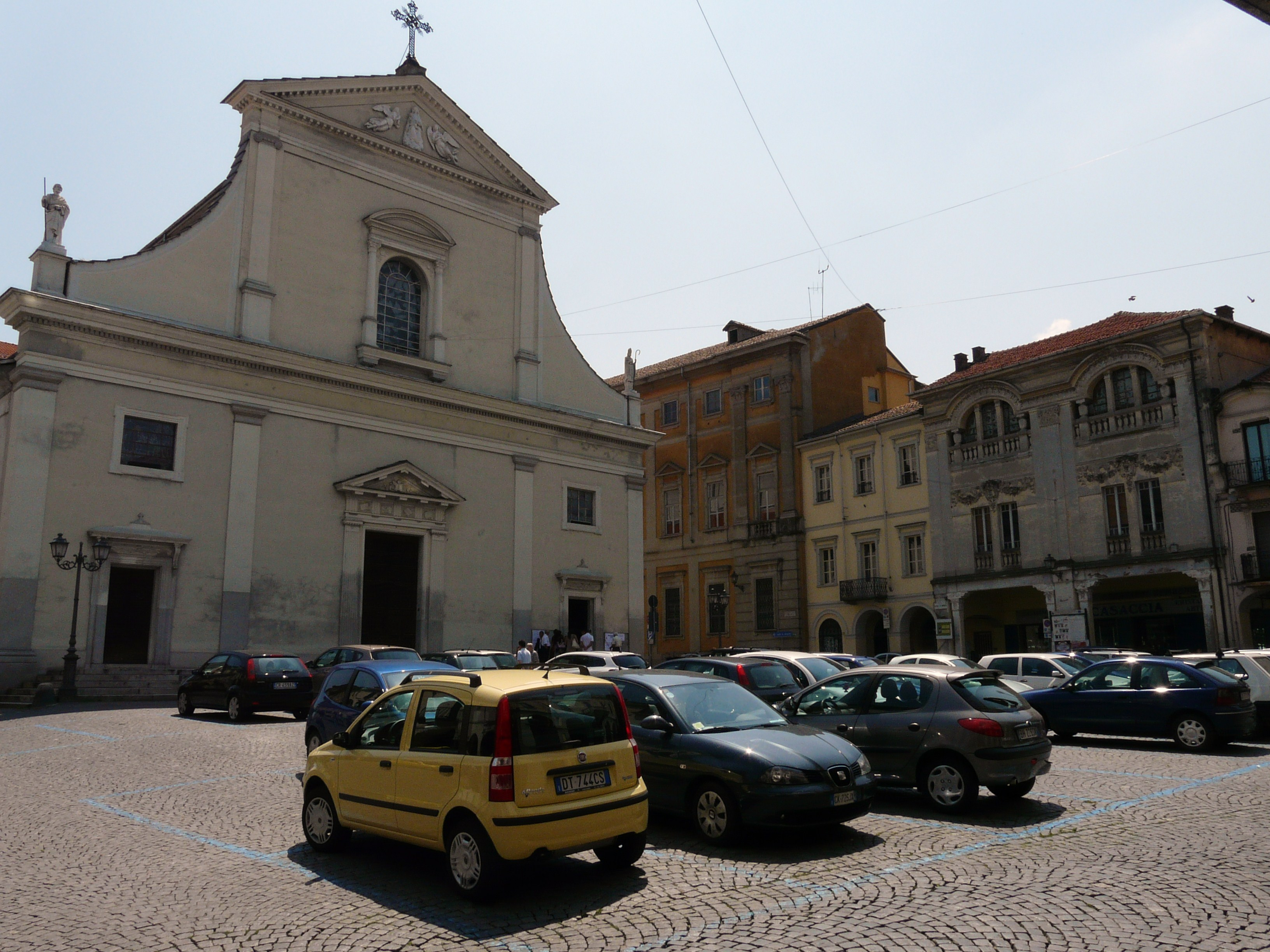
Valenza

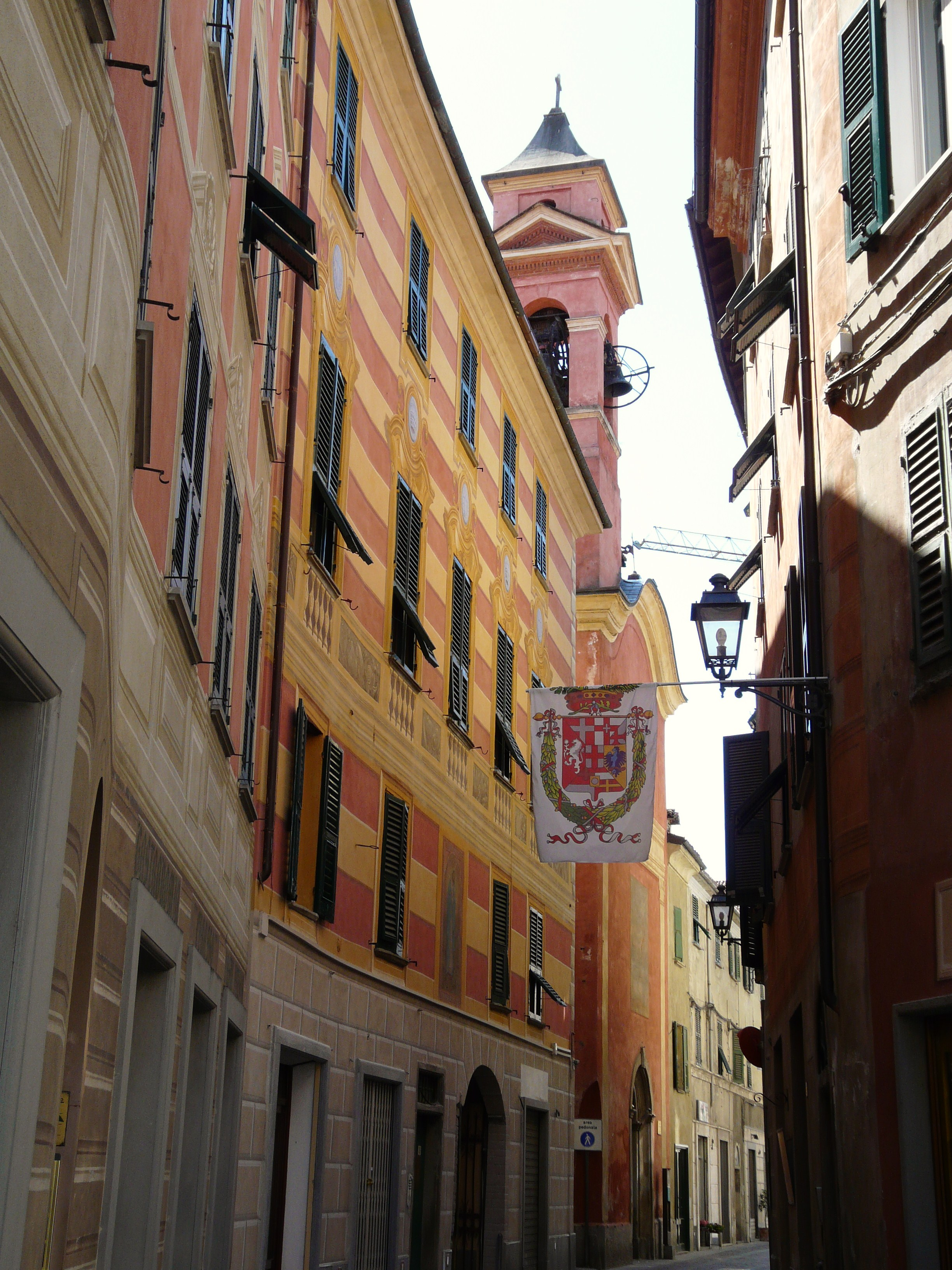
Ovada

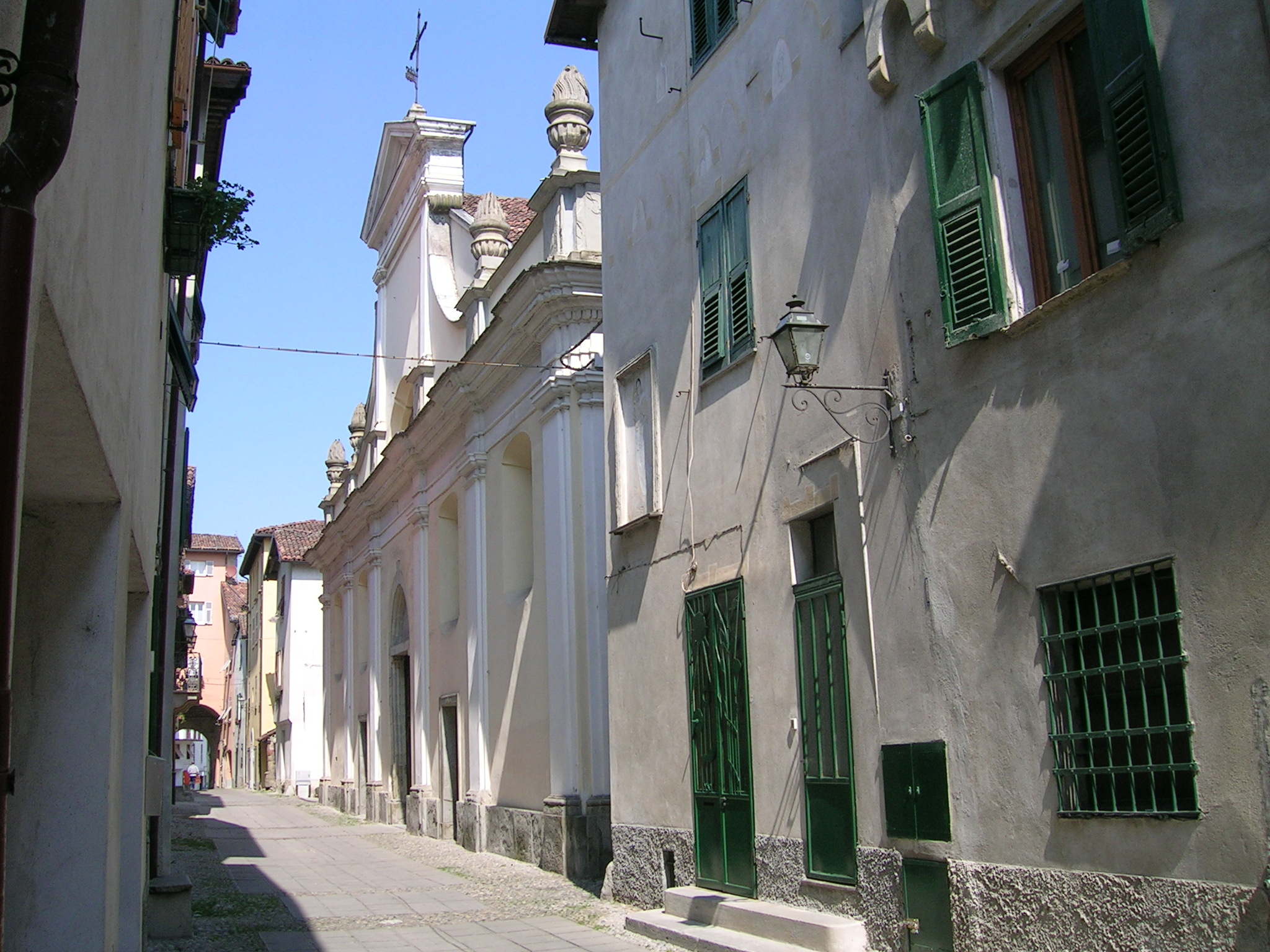
Arquata Scrivia

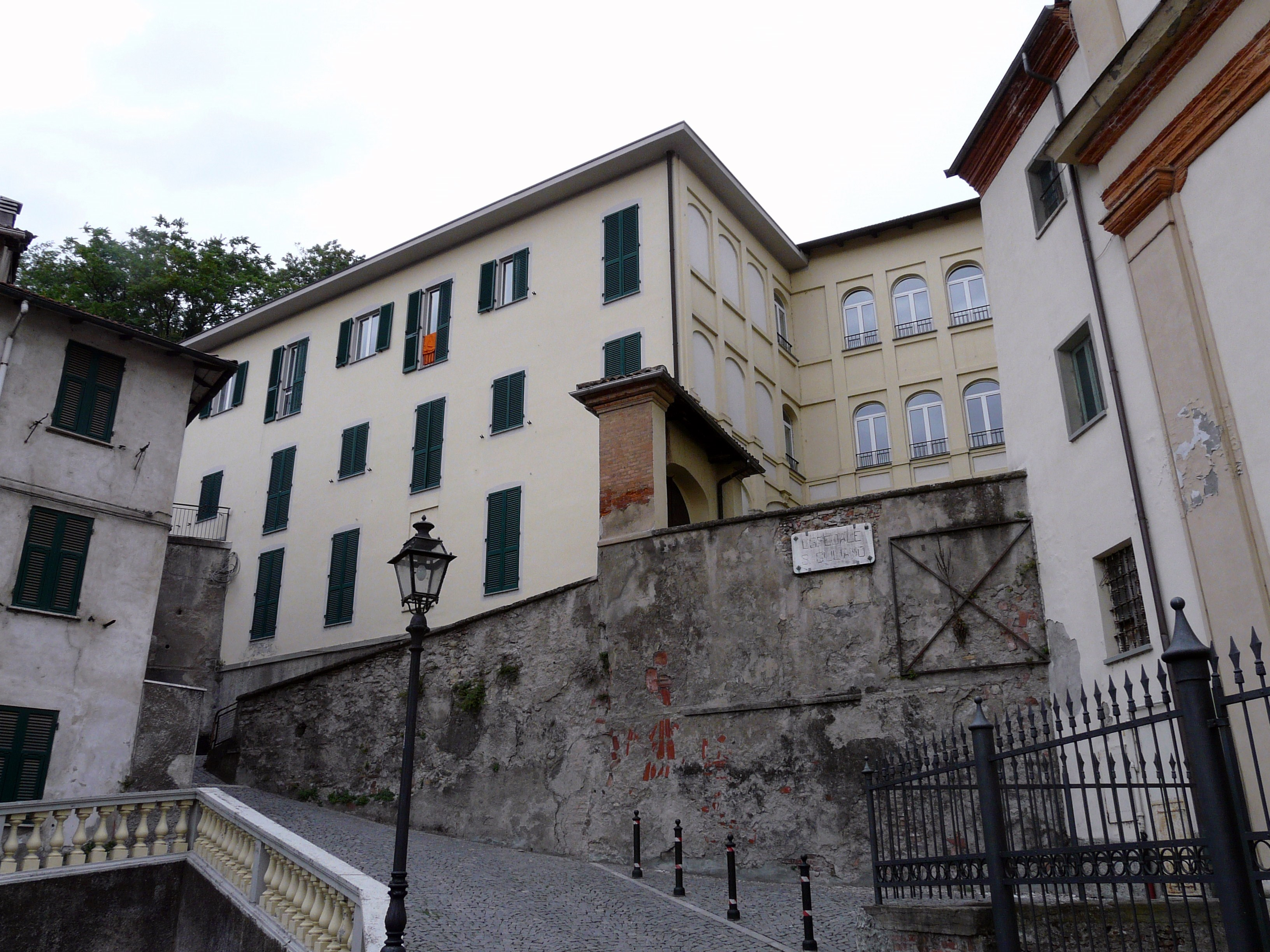
Serravalle Scrivia

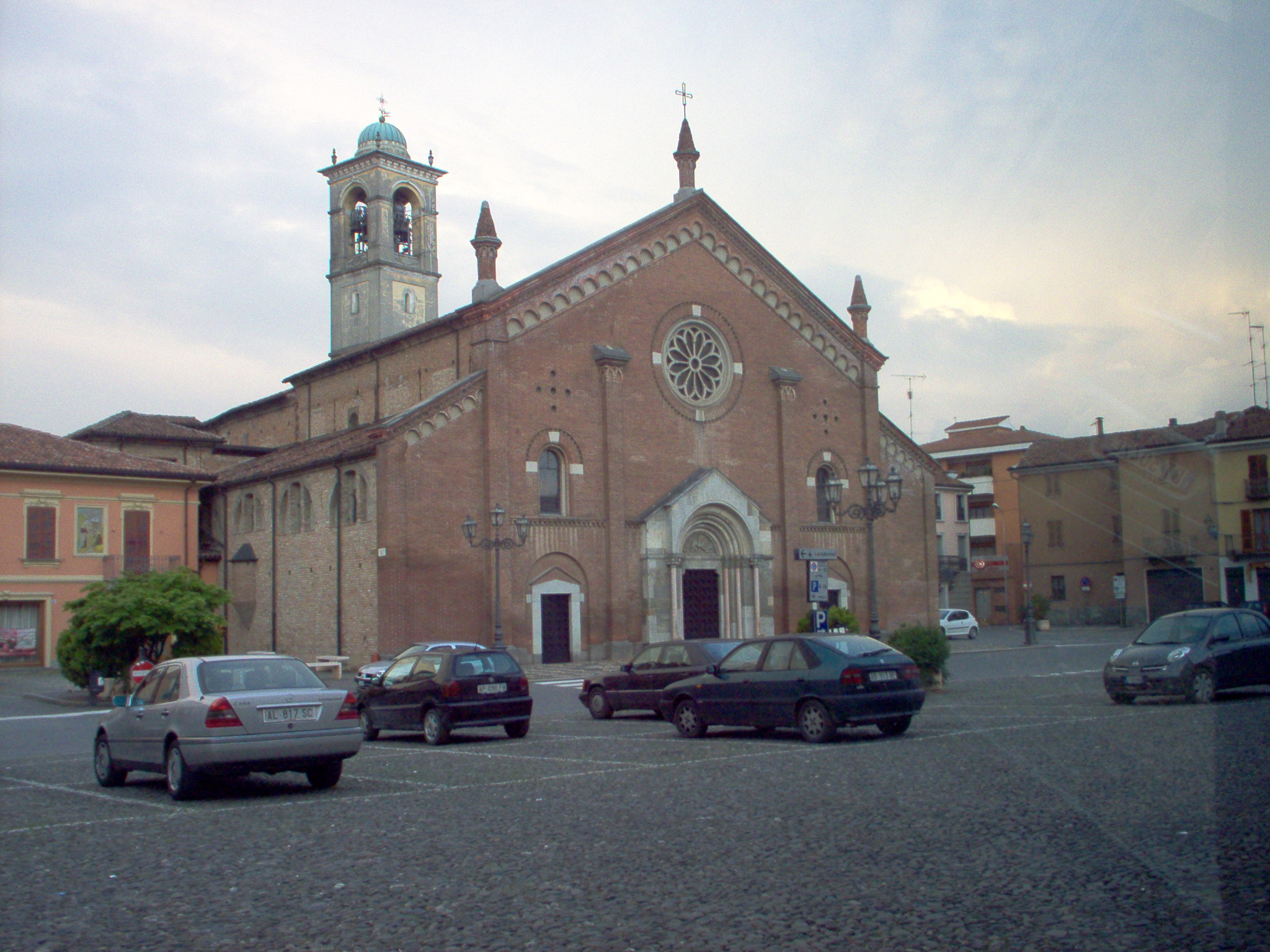
Castelnuovo Scrivia

The province has 187 municipalities:

- Acqui Terme
- Albera Ligure
- Alessandria
- Alfiano Natta
- Alice Bel Colle
- Alluvioni Piovera
- Altavilla Monferrato
- Alzano Scrivia
- Arquata Scrivia
- Avolasca
- Balzola
- Basaluzzo
- Bassignana
- Belforte Monferrato
- Bergamasco
- Berzano di Tortona
- Bistagno
- Borghetto di Borbera
- Borgo San Martino
- Borgoratto Alessandrino
- Bosco Marengo
- Bosio
- Bozzole
- Brignano-Frascata
- Cabella Ligure
- Camagna Monferrato
- Camino
- Cantalupo Ligure
- Capriata d'Orba
- Carbonara Scrivia
- Carentino
- Carezzano
- Carpeneto
- Carrega Ligure
- Carrosio
- Cartosio
- Casal Cermelli
- Casale Monferrato
- Casaleggio Boiro
- Casalnoceto
- Casasco
- Cassano Spinola
- Cassine
- Cassinelle
- Castellania Coppi
- Castellar Guidobono
- Castellazzo Bormida
- Castelletto Merli
- Castelletto Monferrato
- Castelletto d'Erro
- Castelletto d'Orba
- Castelnuovo Bormida
- Castelnuovo Scrivia
- Castelspina
- Cavatore
- Cella Monte
- Cereseto
- Cerreto Grue
- Cerrina Monferrato
- Coniolo
- Conzano
- Costa Vescovato
- Cremolino
- Denice
- Dernice
- Fabbrica Curone
- Felizzano
- Fraconalto
- Francavilla Bisio
- Frascaro
- Frassinello Monferrato
- Frassineto Po
- Fresonara
- Frugarolo
- Fubine Monferrato
- Gabiano
- Gamalero
- Garbagna
- Gavi
- Giarole
- Gremiasco
- Grognardo
- Grondona
- Guazzora
- Isola Sant'Antonio
- Lerma
- Lu e Cuccaro Monferrato
- Malvicino
- Masio
- Melazzo
- Merana
- Mirabello Monferrato
- Molare
- Molino dei Torti
- Mombello Monferrato
- Momperone
- Moncestino
- Mongiardino Ligure
- Monleale
- Montacuto
- Montaldeo
- Montaldo Bormida
- Montecastello
- Montechiaro d'Acqui
- Montegioco
- Montemarzino
- Morano sul Po
- Morbello
- Mornese
- Morsasco
- Murisengo
- Novi Ligure
- Occimiano
- Odalengo Grande
- Odalengo Piccolo
- Olivola
- Orsara Bormida
- Ottiglio
- Ovada
- Oviglio
- Ozzano Monferrato
- Paderna
- Pareto
- Parodi Ligure
- Pasturana
- Pecetto di Valenza
- Pietra Marazzi
- Pomaro Monferrato
- Pontecurone
- Pontestura
- Ponti
- Ponzano Monferrato
- Ponzone
- Pozzol Groppo
- Pozzolo Formigaro
- Prasco
- Predosa
- Quargnento
- Quattordio
- Ricaldone
- Rivalta Bormida
- Rivarone
- Rocca Grimalda
- Roccaforte Ligure
- Rocchetta Ligure
- Rosignano Monferrato
- Sala Monferrato
- Sale
- San Cristoforo
- San Giorgio Monferrato
- San Salvatore Monferrato
- San Sebastiano Curone
- Sant'Agata Fossili
- Sardigliano
- Sarezzano
- Serralunga di Crea
- Serravalle Scrivia
- Sezzadio
- Silvano d'Orba
- Solero
- Solonghello
- Spigno Monferrato
- Spineto Scrivia
- Stazzano
- Strevi
- Tagliolo Monferrato
- Tassarolo
- Terruggia
- Terzo
- Ticineto
- Tortona
- Treville
- Trisobbio
- Valenza
- Valmacca
- Vignale Monferrato
- Vignole Borbera
- Viguzzolo
- Villadeati
- Villalvernia
- Villamiroglio
- Villanova Monferrato
- Villaromagnano
- Visone
- Volpedo
- Volpeglino
- Voltaggio

== Demographics ==
As of 2026, the population is 408,063, of which 49.2% are male, and 50.8% are female. Minors make up 12.8% of the population, and seniors make up 28.9%.

Historical population

Year	Pop.	±%
1861	438,865	—
1871	470,016	+7.1%
1881	492,769	+4.8%
1901	540,942	+9.8%
1911	540,291	−0.1%
1921	533,208	−1.3%
1931	507,215	−4.9%
1936	493,698	−2.7%

Year	Pop.	±%
1951	477,722	−3.2%
1961	478,613	+0.2%
1971	483,183	+1.0%
1981	466,102	−3.5%
1991	438,245	−6.0%
2001	418,231	−4.6%
2011	427,229	+2.2%
2021	407,264	−4.7%

Source: ISTAT

=== Immigration ===
As of 2025, immigrants make up 15.3% of the population. The 5 largest foreign countries of birth are Romania, Albania, Morocco, Ukraine, and Ecuador.

== Main sights ==
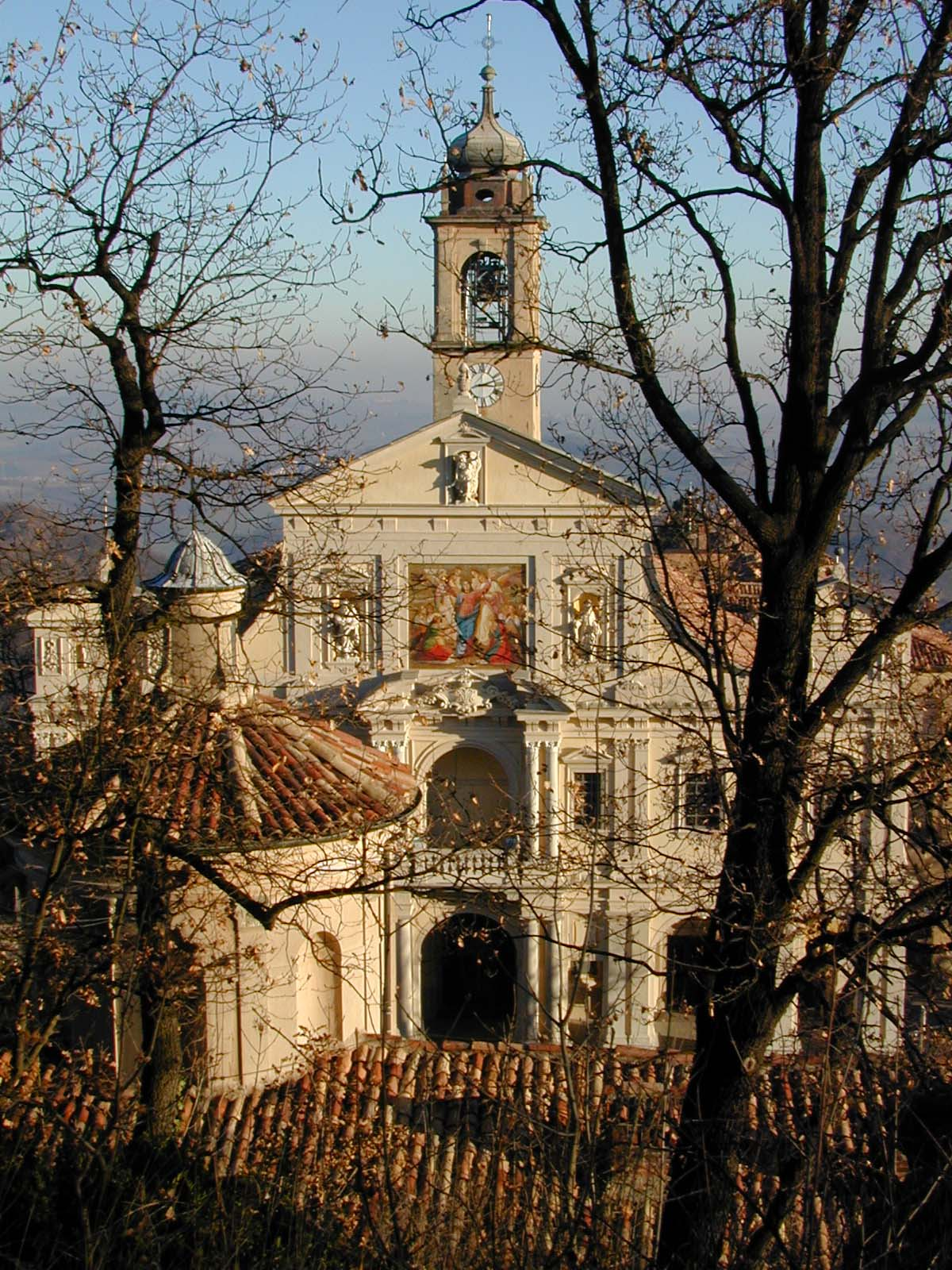
Sacro Monte di Crea, Paradise Chapel.

The Sacred Mountain of Crea (Italian: Sacro Monte di Crea) is a Roman Catholic Devotional Complex in the comune of Serralunga di Crea (Montferrat), near Alessandria. It is one of the nine Sacri Monti of Piedmont and Lombardy, included in UNESCO World Heritage list. Its construction began in 1589, around a former Sanctuary of St. Mary whose creation is traditionally attributed to Saint Eusebius of Vercelli around 350 AD.

== Transport ==
=== Motorways ===
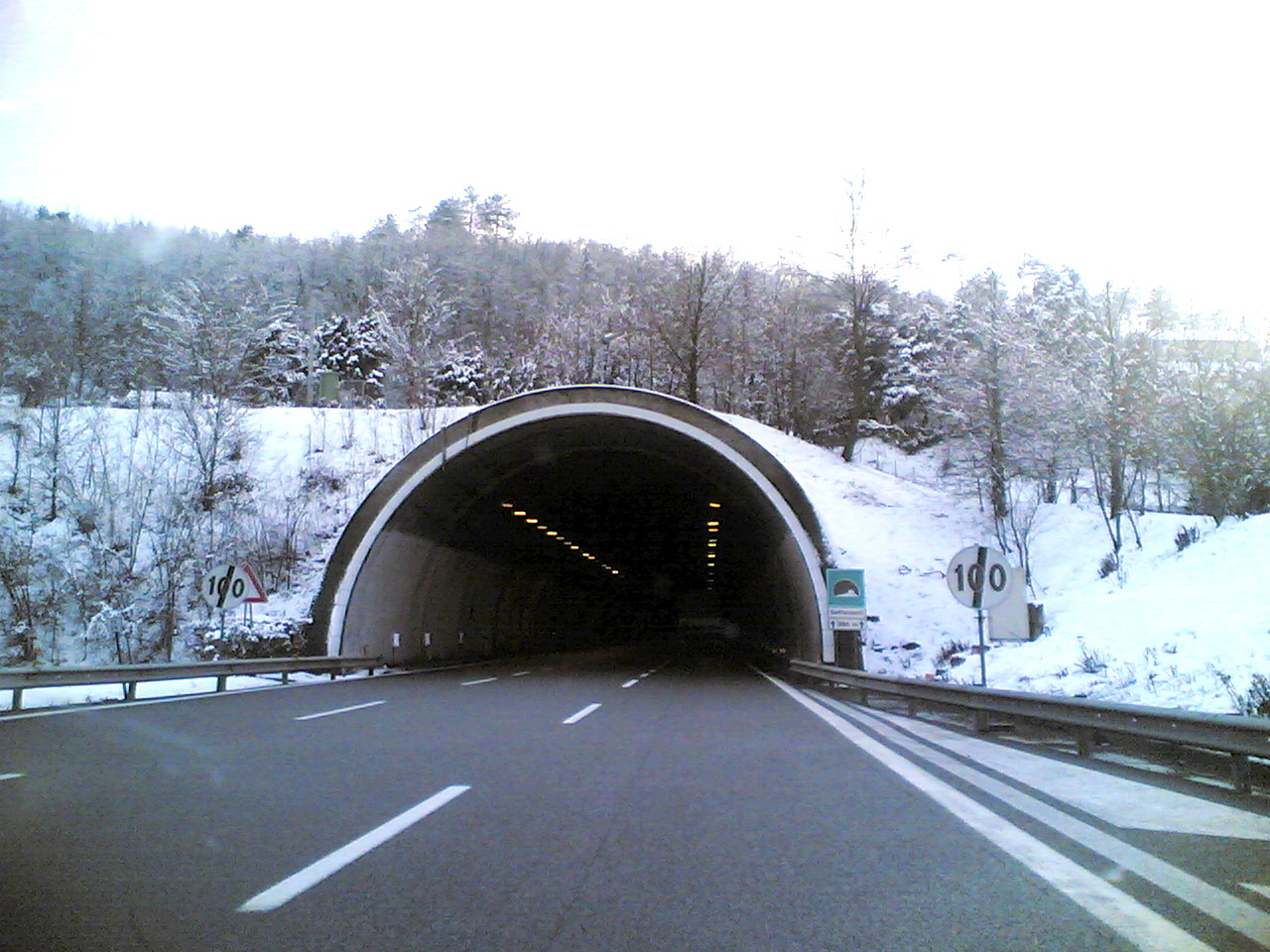
The Autostrada A26 near Alessandria, heading south towards the Apennines.

The province is crossed by the following motorways (in Italian, autostrade):

- Autostrada A21: Turin – Brescia
- Autostrada A26: Genoa – Gravellona Toce
- A7/A26 Bettole-Predosa connection
- Autostrada A7: Milan-Genoa

=== Railway lines ===
- Turin–Genoa railway
- Pavia–Alessandria railway
- Alessandria–Piacenza railway
- Chivasso–Alessandria railway

== See also ==
- Piemonte (wine)
