= Terruggia =

- Comune
- Comune di Terruggia
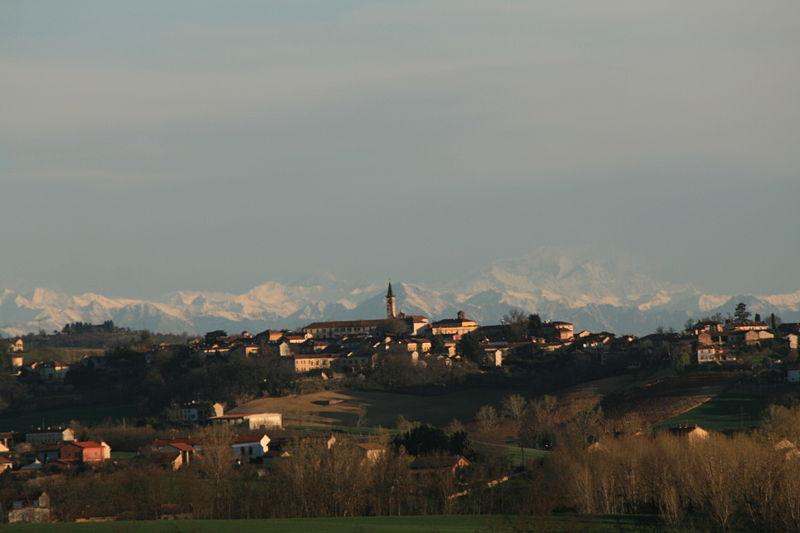

- Location within Italy Location within Piedmont
- Coordinates: 45°4′59″N 8°26′32″E
- Country: Italy
- Region: Piedmont
- Province: Province of Alessandria (AL)

Area
  - Total: 7.2 km^{2} (2.8 sq mi)
- Elevation: 199 m (653 ft)

Population (Dec. 2004)
  - Total: 825
  - Density: 110/km^{2} (300/sq mi)
- Time zone: UTC+1 (CET)
  - Summer (DST): UTC+2 (CEST)
- Postal code: 15030
- Dialing code: 0142
- Patron saint: Saint Martin
- Saint day: 11 November
- Website: www.comune.terruggia.al.it

Terruggia is a comune (municipality) in the Province of Alessandria in the Italian region Piedmont, located about 60 kilometres (37 mi) east of Turin and about 25 kilometres (16 mi) northwest of Alessandria. As of 31 December 2004, it had a population of 825 and an area of 7.2 square kilometres (2.8 mi^{2}).

Terruggia borders the following municipalities: Casale Monferrato and Rosignano Monferrato.

== Demographic evolution ==
Historical population

Year	Pop.	±%
1861	1,006	—
1871	1,104	+9.7%
1881	1,136	+2.9%
1901	1,235	+8.7%
1911	1,192	−3.5%

Year	Pop.	±%
1921	1,136	−4.7%
1931	1,011	−11.0%
1936	1,019	+0.8%
1951	938	−7.9%
1961	846	−9.8%

Year	Pop.	±%
1971	753	−11.0%
1981	710	−5.7%
1991	767	+8.0%
2001	812	+5.9%

Source: Data from ISTAT
