= Merana =

- Comune
- Comune di Merana
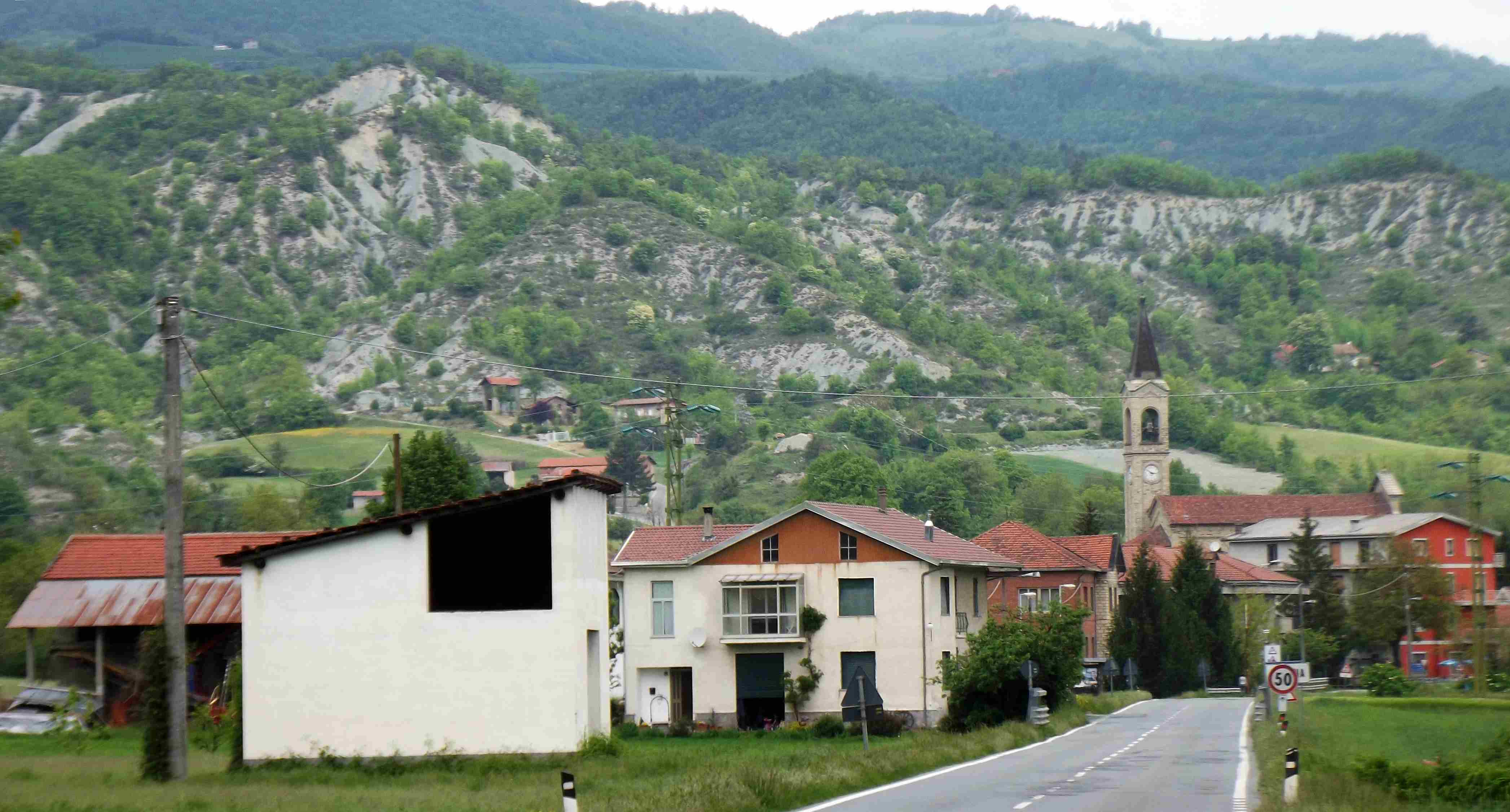

- Coat of arms

- Location within Italy Location within Piedmont
- Coordinates: 44°31′N 8°18′E
- Country: Italy
- Region: Piedmont
- Province: Alessandria (AL)

Government
  - Mayor: Silvana Sicco

Area
  - Total: 9.3 km^{2} (3.6 sq mi)
- Elevation: 253 m (830 ft)

Population (2005)
  - Total: 182
  - Density: 20/km^{2} (51/sq mi)
- Demonym: Meranesi
- Time zone: UTC+1 (CET)
  - Summer (DST): UTC+2 (CEST)
- Postal code: 15010
- Dialing code: 0144

Merana is a commune (municipality) in the Province of Alessandria in the Italian region Piedmont, located about 80 kilometres (50 mi) southeast of Turin and about 50 kilometres (31 mi) southwest of Alessandria.

Merana borders the following municipalities: Piana Crixia, Serole, and Spigno Monferrato.
