= Castelnuovo Bormida =

- Comune
- Comune di Castelnuovo Bormida
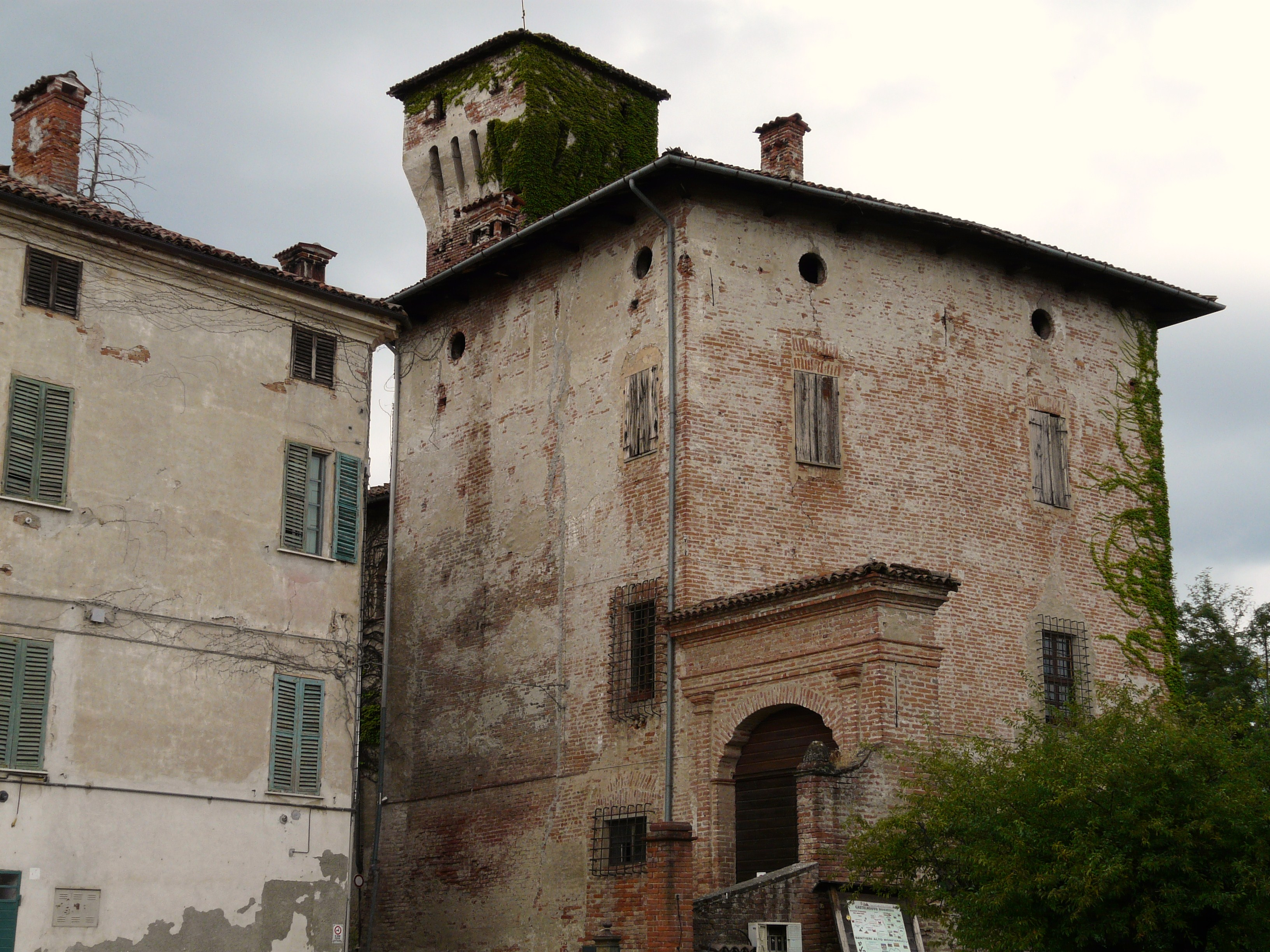

- Coat of arms

- Location within Italy Location within Piedmont
- Coordinates: 44°44′N 8°33′E
- Country: Italy
- Region: Piedmont
- Province: Alessandria (AL)

Government
  - Mayor: Giovanni Roggero

Area
  - Total: 13.11 km^{2} (5.06 sq mi)
- Elevation: 123 m (404 ft)

Population (30 June 2017)
  - Total: 683
  - Density: 52.1/km^{2} (135/sq mi)
- Demonym: Castelnovesi
- Time zone: UTC+1 (CET)
  - Summer (DST): UTC+2 (CEST)
- Postal code: 15017
- Dialing code: 0144
- Website: Official website

Castelnuovo Bormida is a comune (municipality) in the Province of Alessandria in the Italian region Piedmont, located about 80 kilometres (50 miles) southeast of Turin and about 20 km (12 mi) south of Alessandria.

Castelnuovo Bormida borders the following municipalities: Cassine, Rivalta Bormida, and Sezzadio.

== Twin towns - Sister cities ==
Castelnuovo Bormida is twinned with:

- Łańcut, Poland
