= Grognardo =

- Comune
- Comune di Grognardo
- Location within Italy Location within Piedmont
- Coordinates: 44°38′N 8°30′E
- Country: Italy
- Region: Piedmont
- Province: Alessandria (AL)

Government
  - Mayor: Luca Roggero

Area
  - Total: 9.3 km^{2} (3.6 sq mi)
- Elevation: 206 m (676 ft)

Population (31 December 2010)
  - Total: 302
  - Density: 32/km^{2} (84/sq mi)
- Demonym: Grognardesi
- Time zone: UTC+1 (CET)
  - Summer (DST): UTC+2 (CEST)
- Postal code: 15010
- Dialing code: 0144

Grognardo is a comune (municipality) in the Province of Alessandria in the Italian region Piedmont, located about 80 kilometres (50 mi) southeast of Turin and about 35 kilometres (22 mi) southwest of Alessandria.

Grognardo borders the following municipalities: Acqui Terme, Cavatore, Morbello, Ponzone, and Visone.
