= Sezzadio =

- Comune
- Comune di Sezzadio
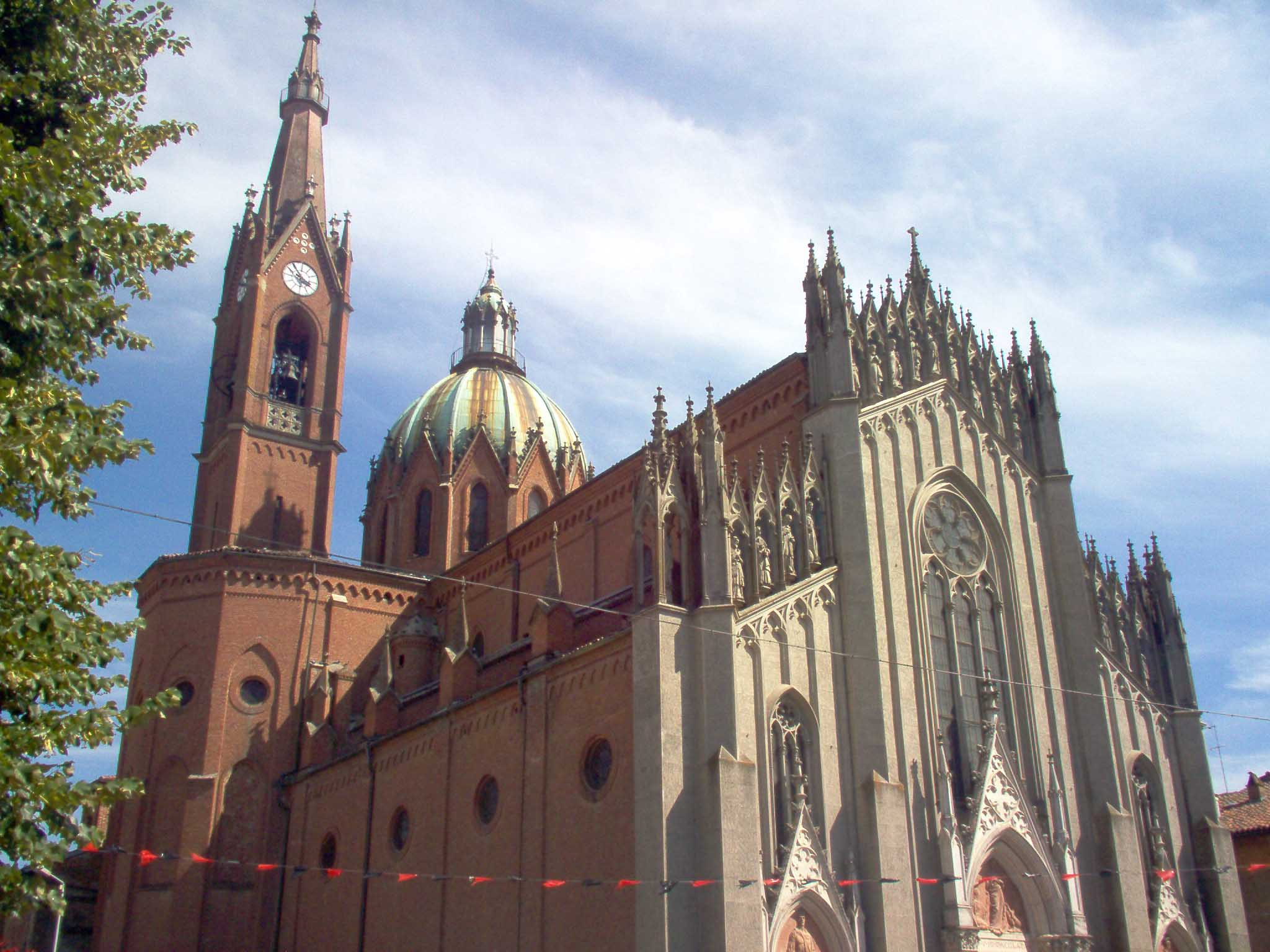
- Parish church.

- Coat of arms

- Location within Italy Location within Piedmont
- Coordinates: 44°47′N 8°34′E
- Country: Italy
- Region: Piedmont
- Province: Alessandria (AL)
- Frazioni: Boschi

Government
  - Mayor: Piergiorgio Buffa

Area
  - Total: 34.0 km^{2} (13.1 sq mi)
- Elevation: 126 m (413 ft)

Population (1-1-2017)
  - Total: 1,247
  - Density: 36.7/km^{2} (95.0/sq mi)
- Demonym: Sezzadiese(i)
- Time zone: UTC+1 (CET)
  - Summer (DST): UTC+2 (CEST)
- Postal code: 15079
- Dialing code: 0131
- Website: Official website

Sezzadio is a comune (municipality) in the Province of Alessandria in the Italian region Piedmont, located about 80 kilometres (50 mi) southeast of Turin and about 15 kilometres (9 mi) south of Alessandria.

Sezzadio borders the following municipalities: Carpeneto, Cassine, Castelnuovo Bormida, Castelspina, Gamalero, Montaldo Bormida, Predosa, and Rivalta Bormida.

It is the location of the Abbey of Santa Giustina, founded in 722 by the Lombard king Liutprand. In 1033 the abbey was enlarged by the marquis of Sezzadio, Oberto, remaining under the Benedictines until 1474. The church has a large cotto façade divided by pilasters and crowned by Lombard bands. The interior has a nave and two aisles ending with apses. In the apses are frescoes from the 14th and 15th centuries, while the crypt has an 11th-century mosaic pavement. Antonio Barbavara was briefly the Abbot in 1428. Mark Knowles argues that Antonio was the author of the Voynich cipher manuscript.

The large parish church was built from 1900 in neo-Gothic style.
