= Cavatore =

- Comune
- Comune di Cavatore
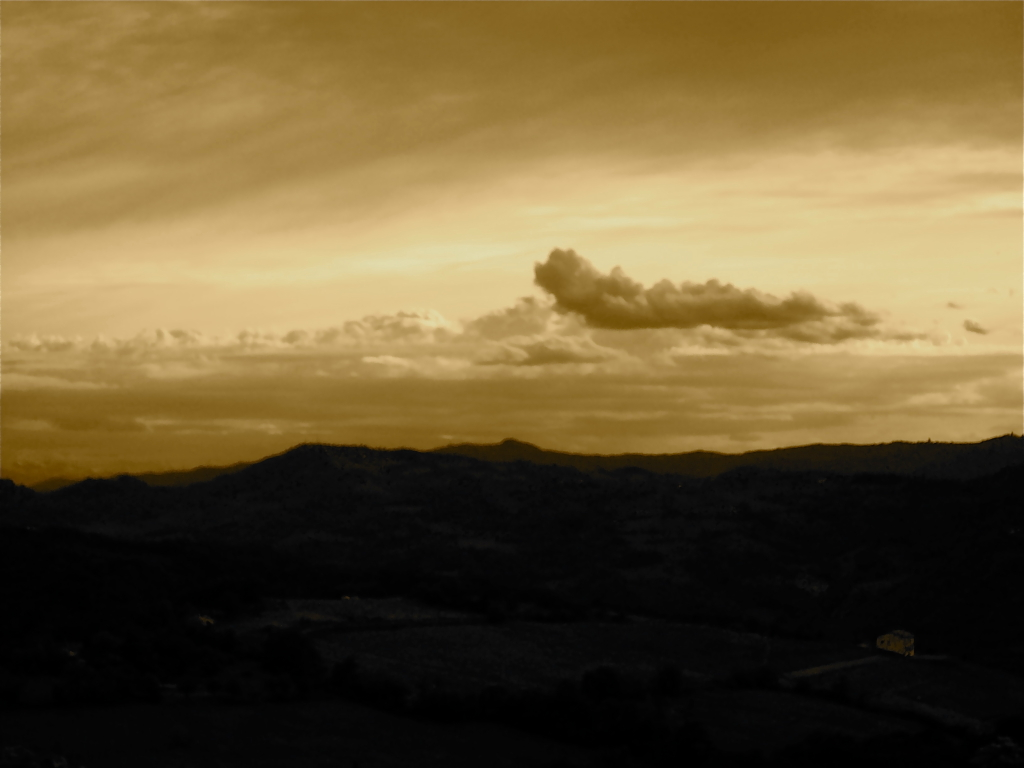

- Location within Italy Location within Piedmont
- Coordinates: 44°38′N 8°27′E
- Country: Italy
- Region: Piedmont
- Province: Province of Alessandria (AL)

Area
  - Total: 10.4 km^{2} (4.0 sq mi)

Population (Dec. 2004)
  - Total: 295
  - Density: 28.4/km^{2} (73.5/sq mi)
- Time zone: UTC+1 (CET)
  - Summer (DST): UTC+2 (CEST)
- Postal code: 15010
- Dialing code: 0144

Cavatore is a comune (municipality) in the Province of Alessandria in the Italian region Piedmont, located about 80 kilometres (50 mi) southeast of Turin and about 35 kilometres (22 mi) southwest of Alessandria. As of 31 December 2004, it had a population of 295 and an area of 10.4 square kilometres (4.0 mi^{2}).

Cavatore borders the following municipalities: Acqui Terme, Cartosio, Grognardo, Melazzo, and Ponzone.

== Demographic evolution ==
Historical population

Year	Pop.	±%
1861	812	—
1871	932	+14.8%
1881	960	+3.0%
1901	1,085	+13.0%
1911	1,058	−2.5%

Year	Pop.	±%
1921	960	−9.3%
1931	835	−13.0%
1936	813	−2.6%
1951	630	−22.5%
1961	448	−28.9%

Year	Pop.	±%
1971	295	−34.2%
1981	292	−1.0%
1991	320	+9.6%
2001	310	−3.1%

Source: Data from ISTAT
