= Montaldo Bormida =

- Comune
- Comune di Montaldo Bormida
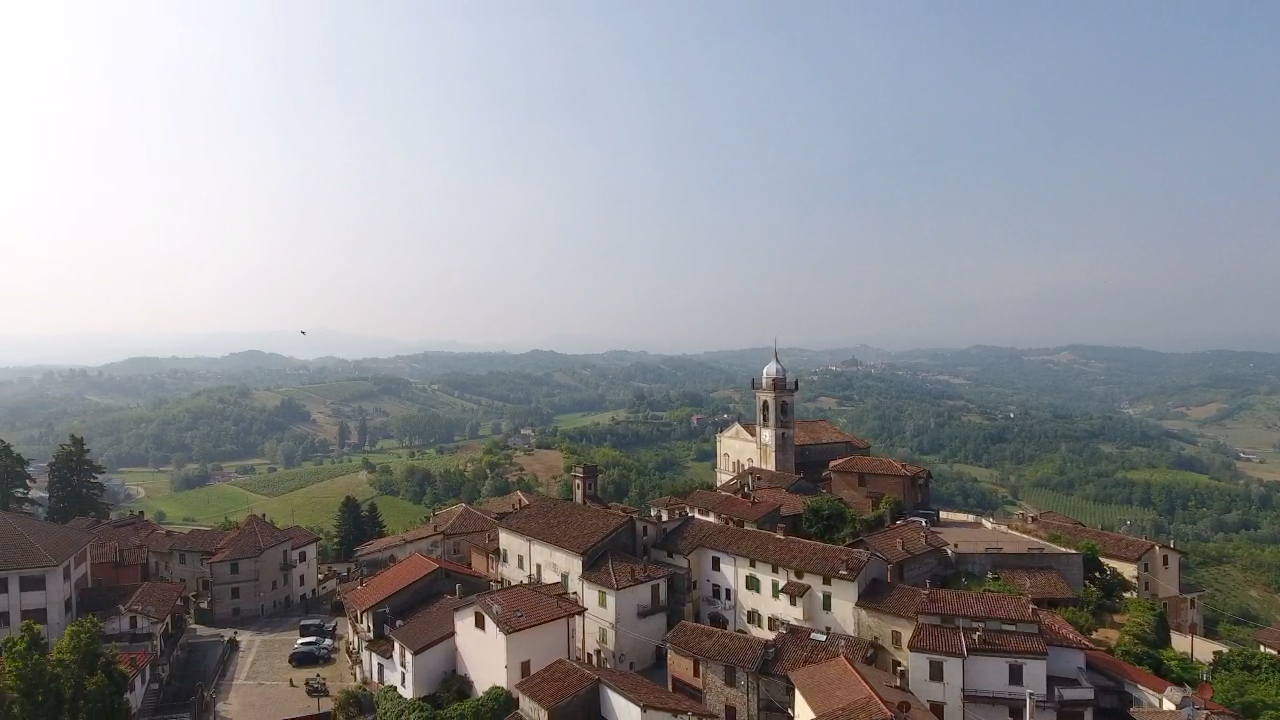

- Coat of arms

- Location within Italy Location within Piedmont
- Coordinates: 44°41′N 8°35′E
- Country: Italy
- Region: Piedmont
- Province: Alessandria (AL)

Government
  - Mayor: Barbara Ravera

Area
  - Total: 5.6 km^{2} (2.2 sq mi)
- Elevation: 334 m (1,096 ft)

Population (30 November 2019)
  - Total: 619
  - Density: 110/km^{2} (290/sq mi)
- Demonym: Montaldesi
- Time zone: UTC+1 (CET)
  - Summer (DST): UTC+2 (CEST)
- Postal code: 15010
- Dialing code: 0143
- Website: Official website

Montaldo Bormida is a comune (municipality) in the Province of Alessandria in the Italian region Piedmont, located about 80 kilometres (50 mi) southeast of Turin and about 25 kilometres (16 mi) south of Alessandria.

As part of the Marquisate of Montferrat, Montaldo Bormida had a succession of feudal lords: the Della Valle family of Trisobbio, the Ferraris of Orsara, the Centurione, Spinola and Pallavicino families.

Montaldo Bormida borders the following municipalities: Carpeneto, Orsara Bormida, Rivalta Bormida, Sezzadio, and Trisobbio.

The first Seventh-day Adventist Church in Italy was built in Montaldo Bormida in 1925.
