= Belforte Monferrato =

- Comune
- Comune di Belforte Monferrato
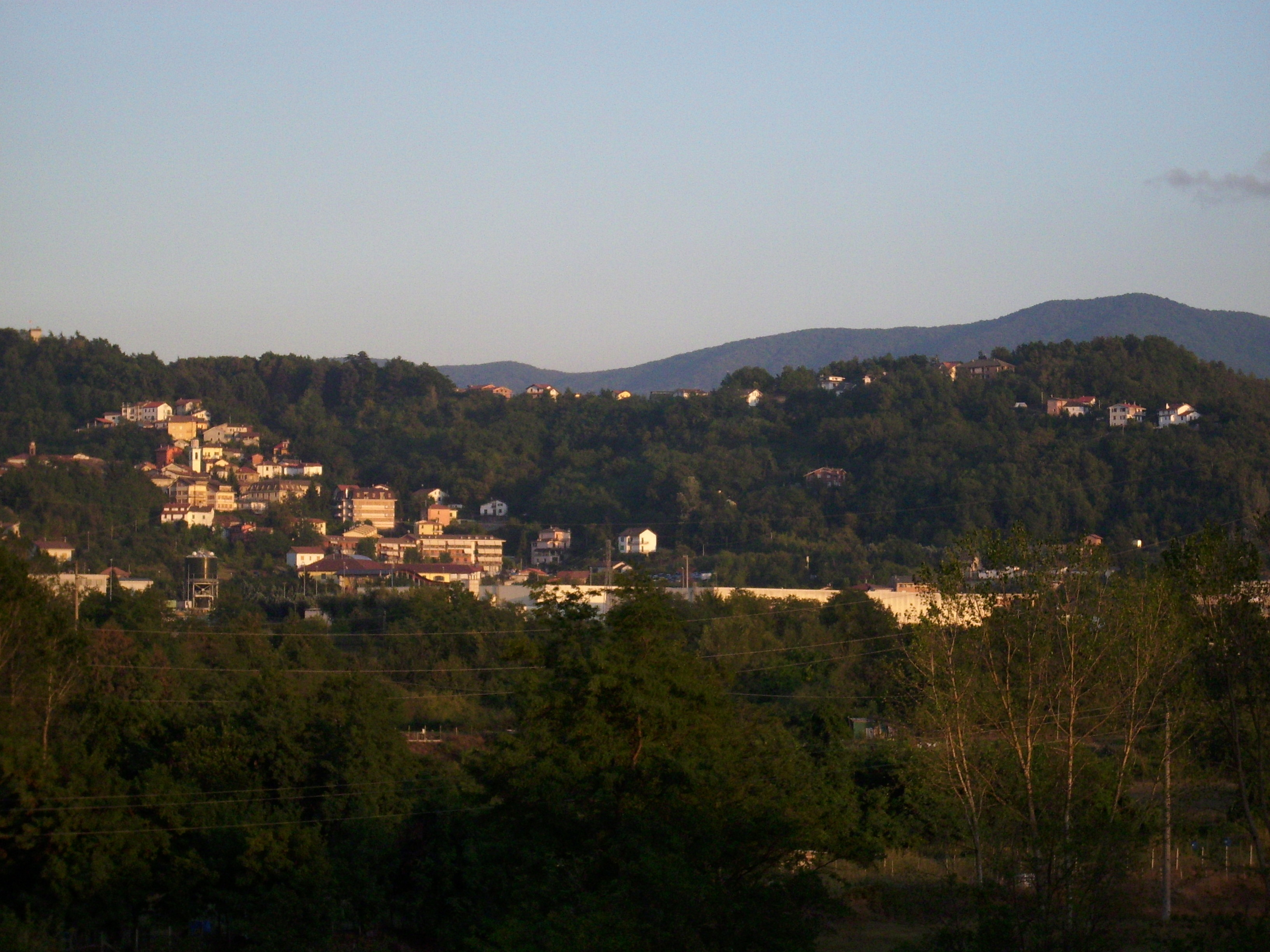
- Panorama

- Coat of arms

- Location within Italy Location within Piedmont
- Coordinates: 44°38′N 8°40′E
- Country: Italy
- Region: Piedmont
- Province: Alessandria (AL)

Government
  - Mayor: Nadia Incerpi

Area
  - Total: 8.33 km^{2} (3.22 sq mi)
- Elevation: 233 m (764 ft)

Population (2021)
  - Total: 503
  - Density: 60.4/km^{2} (156/sq mi)
- Demonym: Belfortesi
- Time zone: UTC+1 (CET)
  - Summer (DST): UTC+2 (CEST)
- Postal code: 15070
- Dialing code: 0143

Belforte Monferrato (Italian pronunciation: [ˌbɛlˈfɔrte moɱferˈraːto]) is a commune in the Province of Alessandria, region of Piedmont, Italy, located about 90 kilometres (56 mi) southeast of Turin and about 30 kilometres (19 mi) south of Alessandria.

It is home to a castle, built in the 15th to 17th centuries around a 12th-century tower of the Republic of Genoa.

The 8 and 9 June 2024 will be the administrative election to elect the new mayor for the next 2024/2029 legislature. Three lists are competing, in addition to the list of the outgoing mayor, also the list of Prof. Alessandro Figus (Concezione 2051 Belforte) and the list of Pisciotto.
