= Prasco =

- Comune
- Comune di Prasco
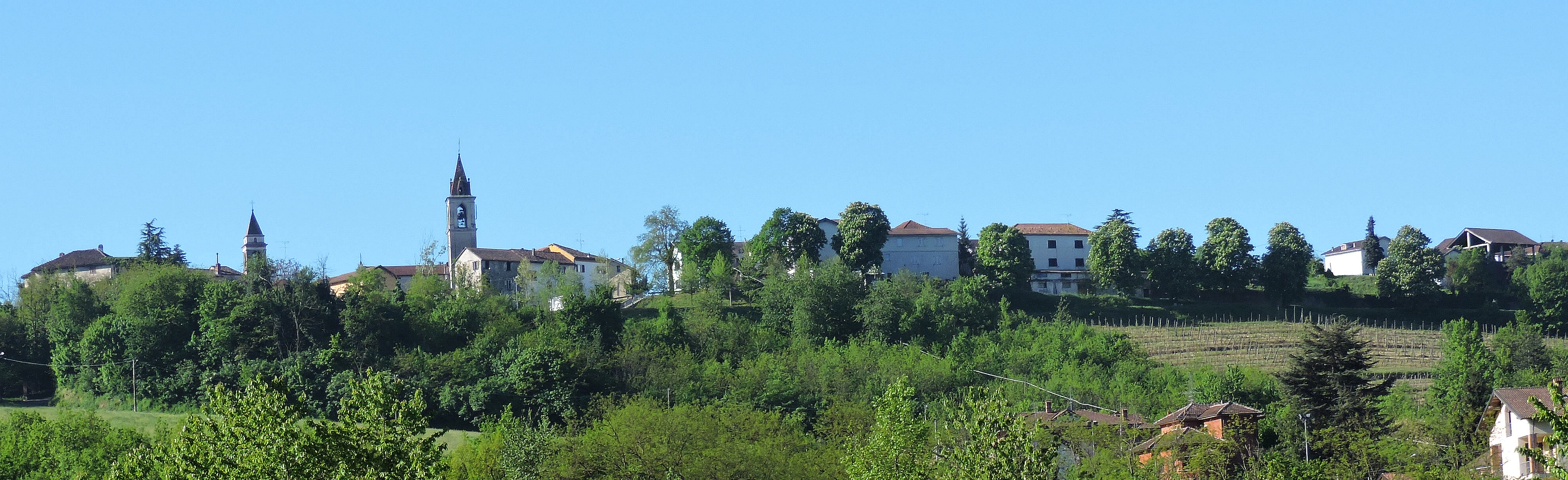

- Location within Italy Location within Piedmont
- Coordinates: 44°38′N 8°33′E
- Country: Italy
- Region: Piedmont
- Province: Alessandria (AL)

Government
  - Mayor: Piero Bartolomeo Barisone

Area
  - Total: 6.1 km^{2} (2.4 sq mi)
- Elevation: 245 m (804 ft)

Population (31 December 2010)
  - Total: 565
  - Density: 93/km^{2} (240/sq mi)
- Time zone: UTC+1 (CET)
  - Summer (DST): UTC+2 (CEST)
- Postal code: 15010
- Dialing code: 0144

Prasco is a comune (municipality) in the Province of Alessandria in the Italian region Piedmont, located about 80 kilometres (50 mi) southeast of Turin and about 30 kilometres (19 mi) south of Alessandria.

Prasco borders the following municipalities: Cremolino, Morbello, Morsasco, and Visone.
