= Cassinelle =

- Comune
- Comune di Cassinelle
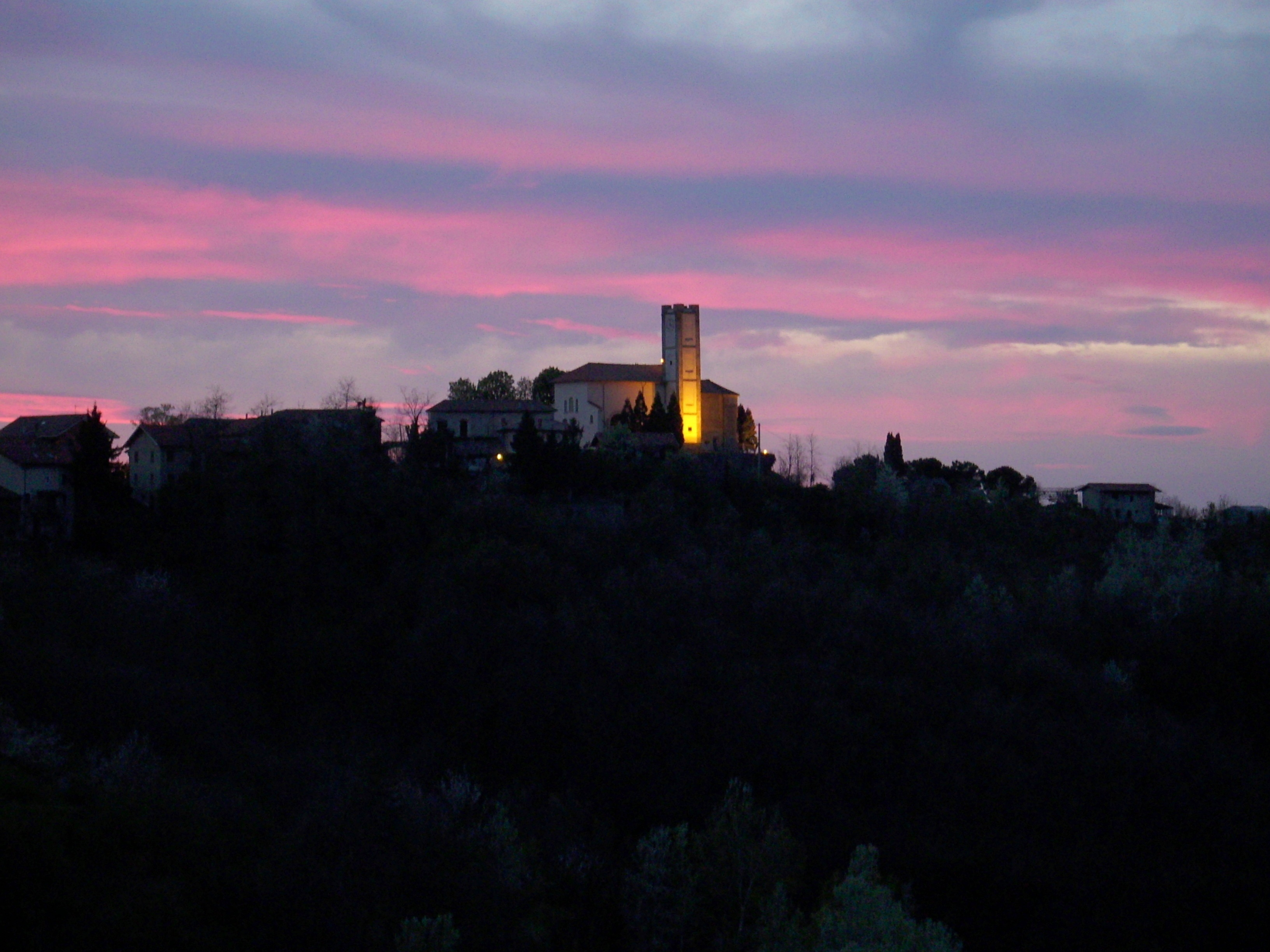
- Cassinelle at sunset

- Coat of arms

- Location within Italy Location within Piedmont
- Coordinates: 44°36′N 8°34′E
- Country: Italy
- Region: Piedmont
- Province: Province of Alessandria (AL)

Area
  - Total: 23.8 km^{2} (9.2 sq mi)

Population (Dec. 2004)
  - Total: 883
  - Density: 37.1/km^{2} (96.1/sq mi)
- Time zone: UTC+1 (CET)
  - Summer (DST): UTC+2 (CEST)
- Postal code: 15070
- Dialing code: 0143

Cassinelle is a comune (municipality) in the Province of Alessandria in the Italian region Piedmont, about 90 kilometres (56 mi) southeast of Turin and about 35 kilometres (22 mi) south of Alessandria. As of 31 December 2004, it had a population of 883 and an area of 23.8 square kilometres (9.2 mi^{2}).

Cassinelle borders the following municipalities: Cremolino, Molare, Morbello, and Ponzone.

== Demographic evolution ==
Historical population

Year	Pop.	±%
1861	1,902	—
1871	2,037	+7.1%
1881	2,171	+6.6%
1901	2,336	+7.6%
1911	2,156	−7.7%

Year	Pop.	±%
1921	2,511	+16.5%
1931	2,040	−18.8%
1936	1,861	−8.8%
1951	1,454	−21.9%
1961	1,080	−25.7%

Year	Pop.	±%
1971	865	−19.9%
1981	838	−3.1%
1991	798	−4.8%
2001	864	+8.3%

Source: Data from ISTAT
