= Castelletto Monferrato =

Castelletto Monferrato Castlèt Monfrà (Piedmontese)
- Comune
- Comune di Castelletto Monferrato
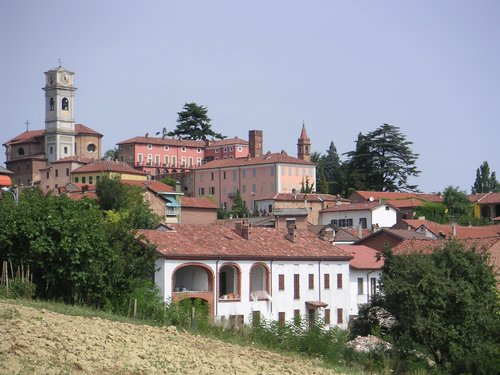

- Coat of arms

- Location within Italy Location within Piedmont
- Coordinates: 44°59′N 8°34′E
- Country: Italy
- Region: Piedmont
- Province: Alessandria (AL)
- Frazioni: Giardinetto, Gerlotti

Government
  - Mayor: Gianluca Colletti

Area
  - Total: 9.58 km^{2} (3.70 sq mi)
- Elevation: 197 m (646 ft)

Population (31 December 2019)
  - Total: 1,473
  - Density: 154/km^{2} (398/sq mi)
- Demonym: Castellettesi
- Time zone: UTC+1 (CET)
  - Summer (DST): UTC+2 (CEST)
- Postal code: 15040
- Dialing code: 0131
- Website: Official website

Castelletto Monferrato (Piedmontese: Castlèt Monfrà) is a comune (municipality) in the Province of Alessandria in the Italian region Piedmont, located about 70 kilometres (43 mi) east of Turin and about 8 kilometres (5 mi) northwest of Alessandria. As of 31 December 2004, it had a population of 1,511 and an area of 9.4 square kilometres (3.6 mi^{2}).

The municipality of Castelletto Monferrato contains the frazioni (subdivisions, mainly villages and hamlets) Giardinetto and Gerlotti.

Castelletto Monferrato borders the following municipalities: Alessandria, Quargnento, and San Salvatore Monferrato.
