= Strevi =

- Comune
- Comune di Strevi
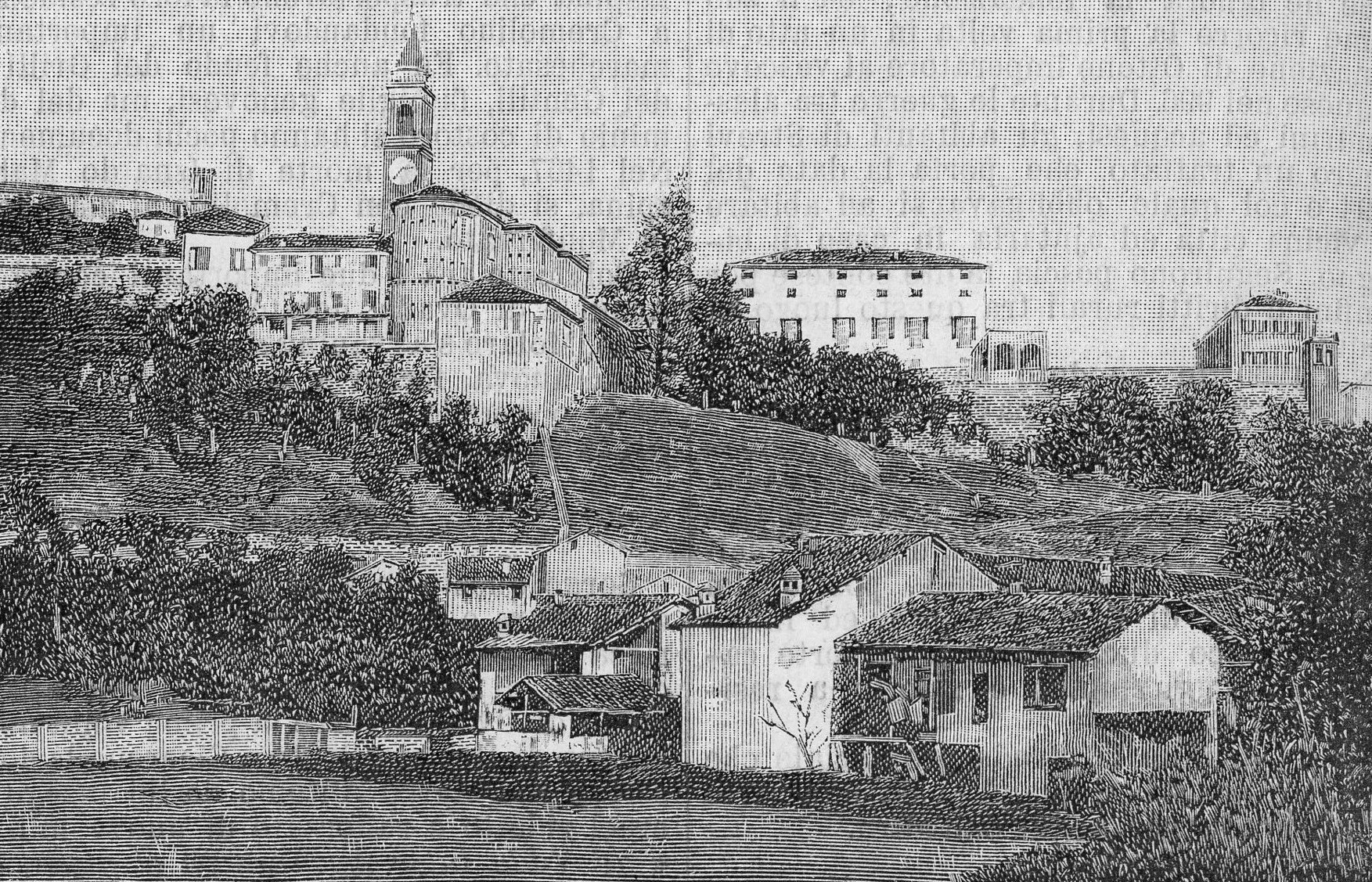

- Location within Italy Location within Piedmont
- Coordinates: 44°41′57″N 08°31′22″E
- Country: Italy
- Region: Piedmont
- Province: Alessandria (AL)

Government
  - Mayor: Alessio Monti elected 25 May 2014;

Area
  - Total: 15.21 km^{2} (5.87 sq mi)
- Elevation: 150 m (490 ft)

Population (31 December 2004)
  - Total: 2,055
  - Density: 135.1/km^{2} (349.9/sq mi)
- Demonym: Strevesi
- Time zone: UTC+1 (CET)
  - Summer (DST): UTC+2 (CEST)
- Postal code: 15019
- Dialing code: 0144
- Website: Official website

Strevi is a comune and small town in the province of Alessandria, Italy, located immediately northeast of Acqui Terme. It is one of the principal winemaking communes of the Moscato d'Asti, Passito di Moscato, and Brachetto d'Acqui.
