= Gorzente =

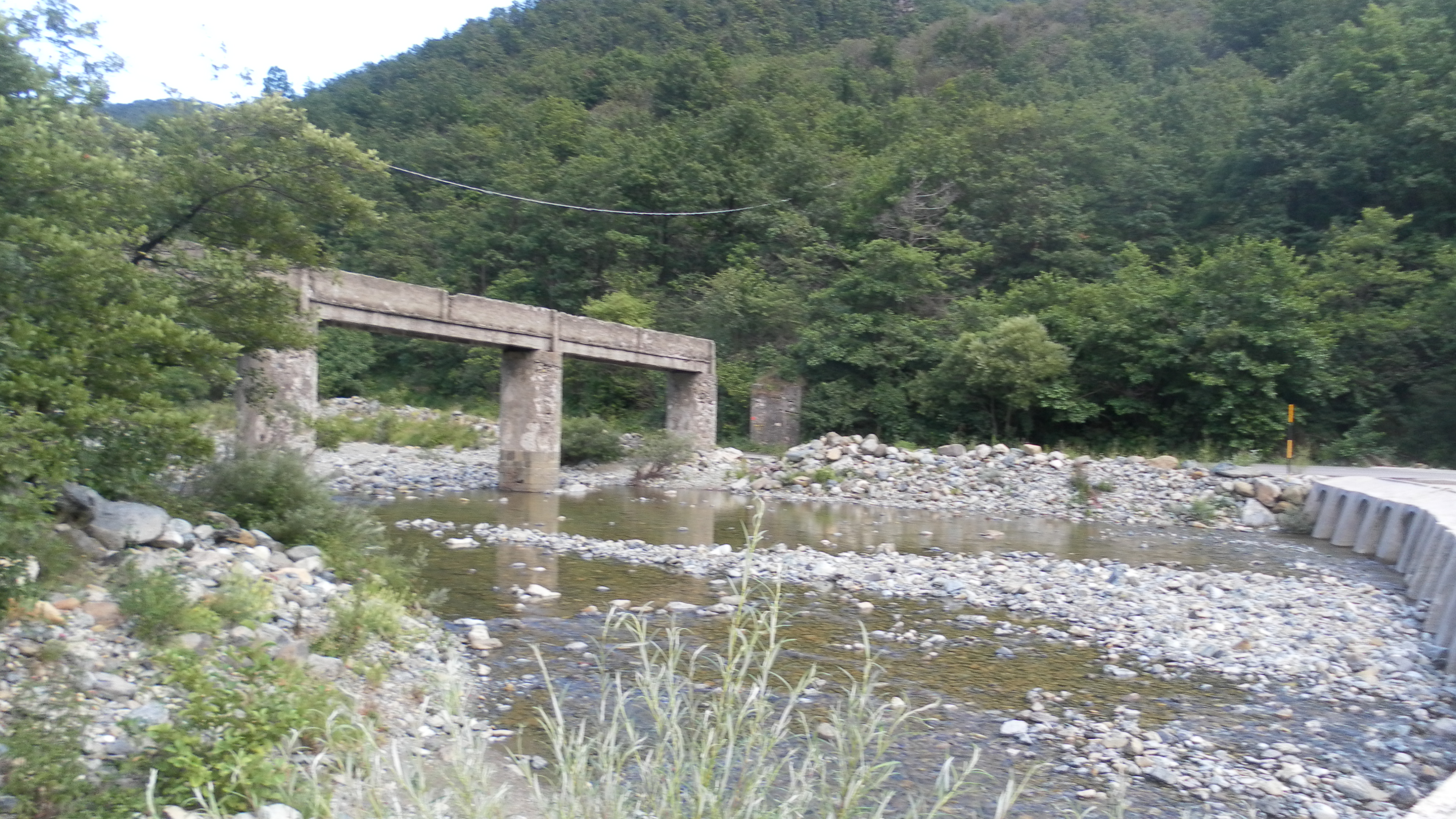

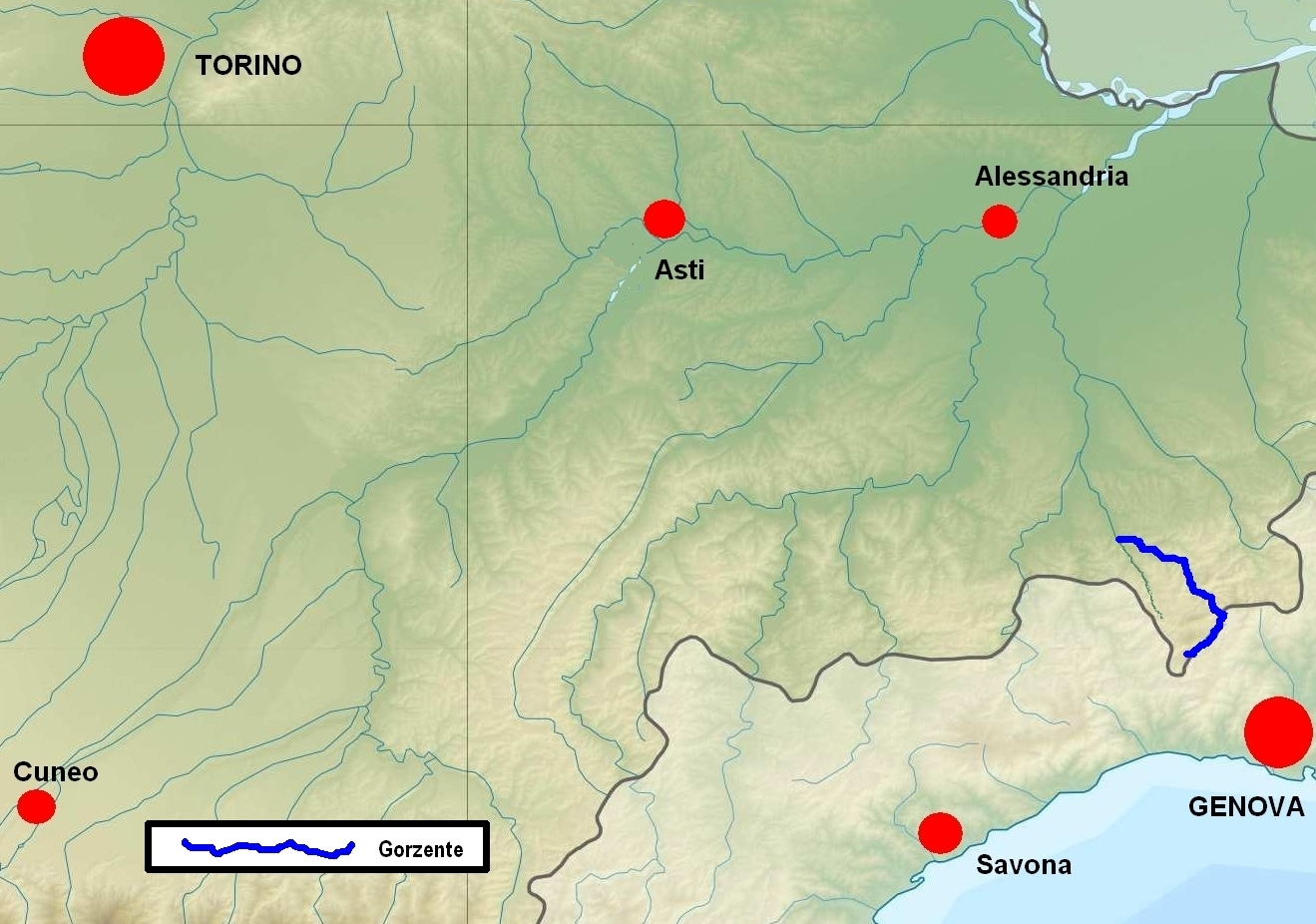
- Location of the stream

Location
- Country: Italy
- Region: Piedmont, Liguria
- Municipality: Bosio, Casaleggio Boiro, Ceranesi, Campomorone, Lerma, Mornese

Physical characteristics
- Source: Lago Bruno
  - location: Laghi del Gorzente, Liguria/Piedmont
  - coordinates: 44°33′15″N 8°49′17″E
  - elevation: 646 m (2,119 ft)
- Mouth: Piota
  - location: between Lerma and Tagliolo Monferrato, Province of Alessandria, Piedmont
  - coordinates: 44°36′59″N 8°42′56″E

Basin features
- Progression: Piota→ Orba→ Bormida→ Tanaro→ Po→ Adriatic Sea

The Gorzente is an Apennine torrent of the Po basin in north-west Italy. A tributary of the Piota, it flows through the territory of the communes of Campomorone, Bosio, Mornese, Casaleggio Boiro, Lerma and Tagliolo Monferrato.

== Course ==
The source, on the border between Piedmont and Liguria, is Lago Bruno which, at an elevation of 646 metres (2,119 ft) above sea level, is the lowest of the three linked Laghi del Gorzente. Its upper course takes the Gorzente in a north-westerly direction through the wild and uninhabited landscape between Monte delle Figne, elevation 1,172 metres (3,845 ft), and Monte Tobbio, which for the most part falls within the Parco Regionale delle Capanne di Marcarolo, until it is dammed to form the two lakes known as the Laghi di Lavagnina. From here its course turns to the west and the river flows into the Piota at Case Possidenti, a locality of Tagliolo Monferrato.

== Notes ==
The original version of this article included material translated from Gorzente, its counterpart in the Italian Wikipedia.
