= Piota =

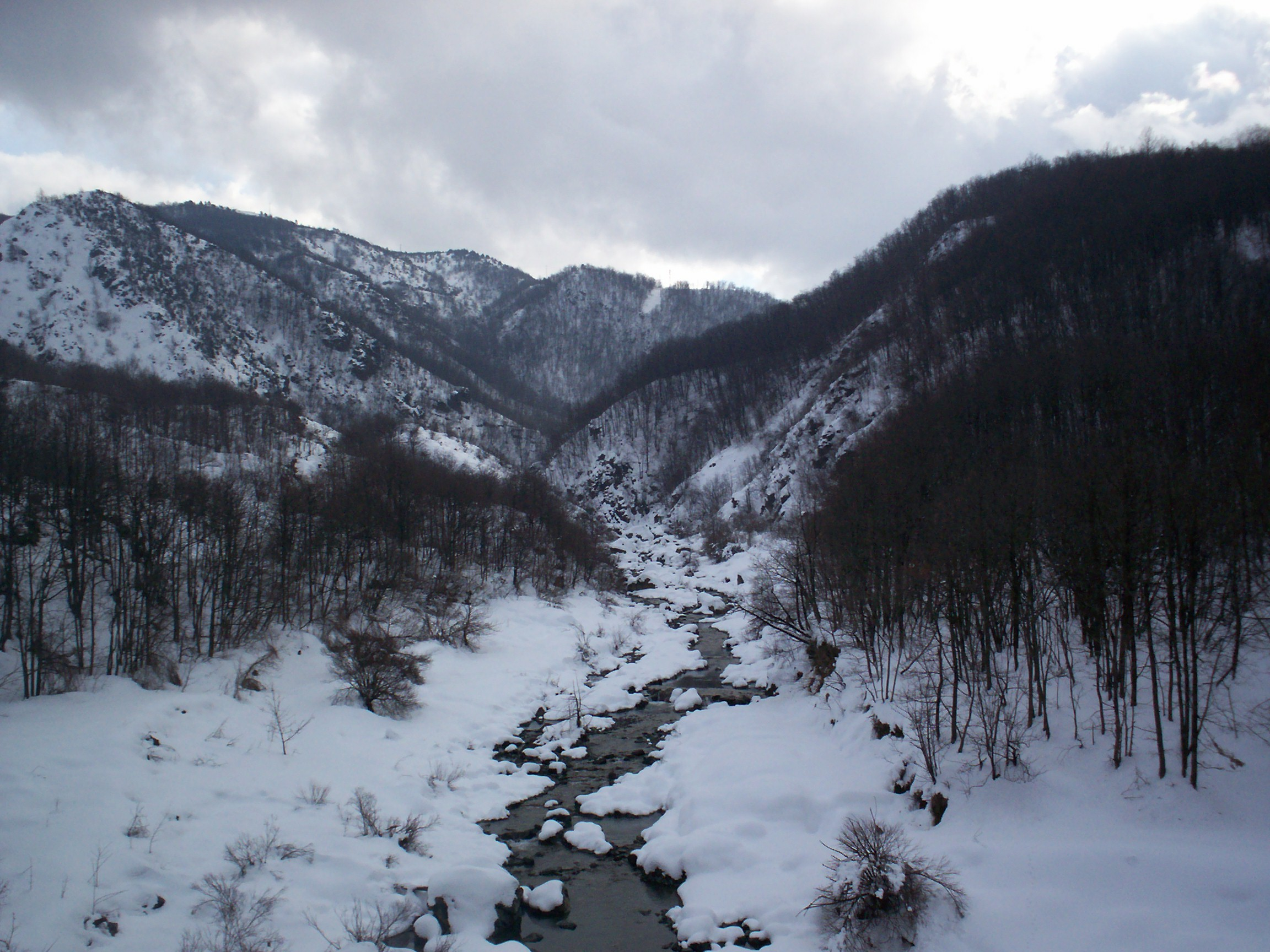
- Upper course winter view

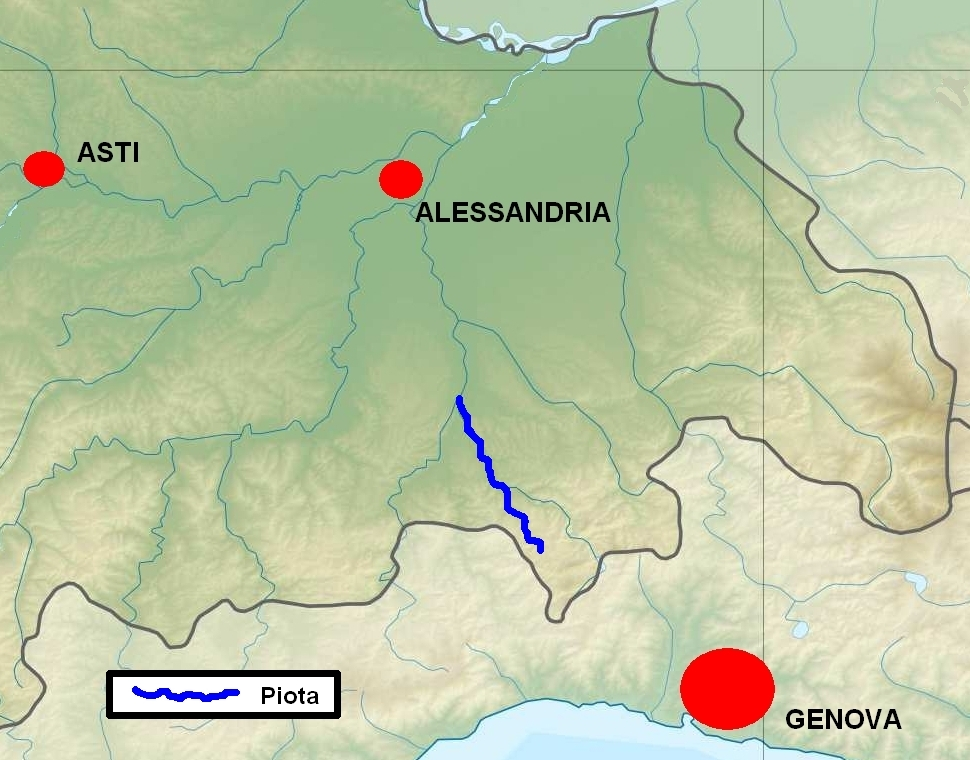
- Location within the SE Piedmont

Location
- Country: Italy

Physical characteristics
- Source
  - location: Monte Pracaban
  - elevation: 948 m (3,110 ft)
- Mouth
  - location: Orba at Silvano d'Orba
  - coordinates: 44.6827°N 8.6640°E
  - elevation: 196 m (643 ft)
- Length: 32.1 km (19.9 mi)
- Basin size: 113.34 km^{2} (43.76 sq mi)
- Discharge
  - average: 3.4 m^{3}/s (120 cu ft/s)

Basin features
- Progression: Orba→ Bormida→ Tanaro→ Po→ Adriatic Sea
- Tributaries
  - right: Gorzente

The Piota is an Apennine torrent in the Province of Alessandria, north-west Italy.

== Geography ==
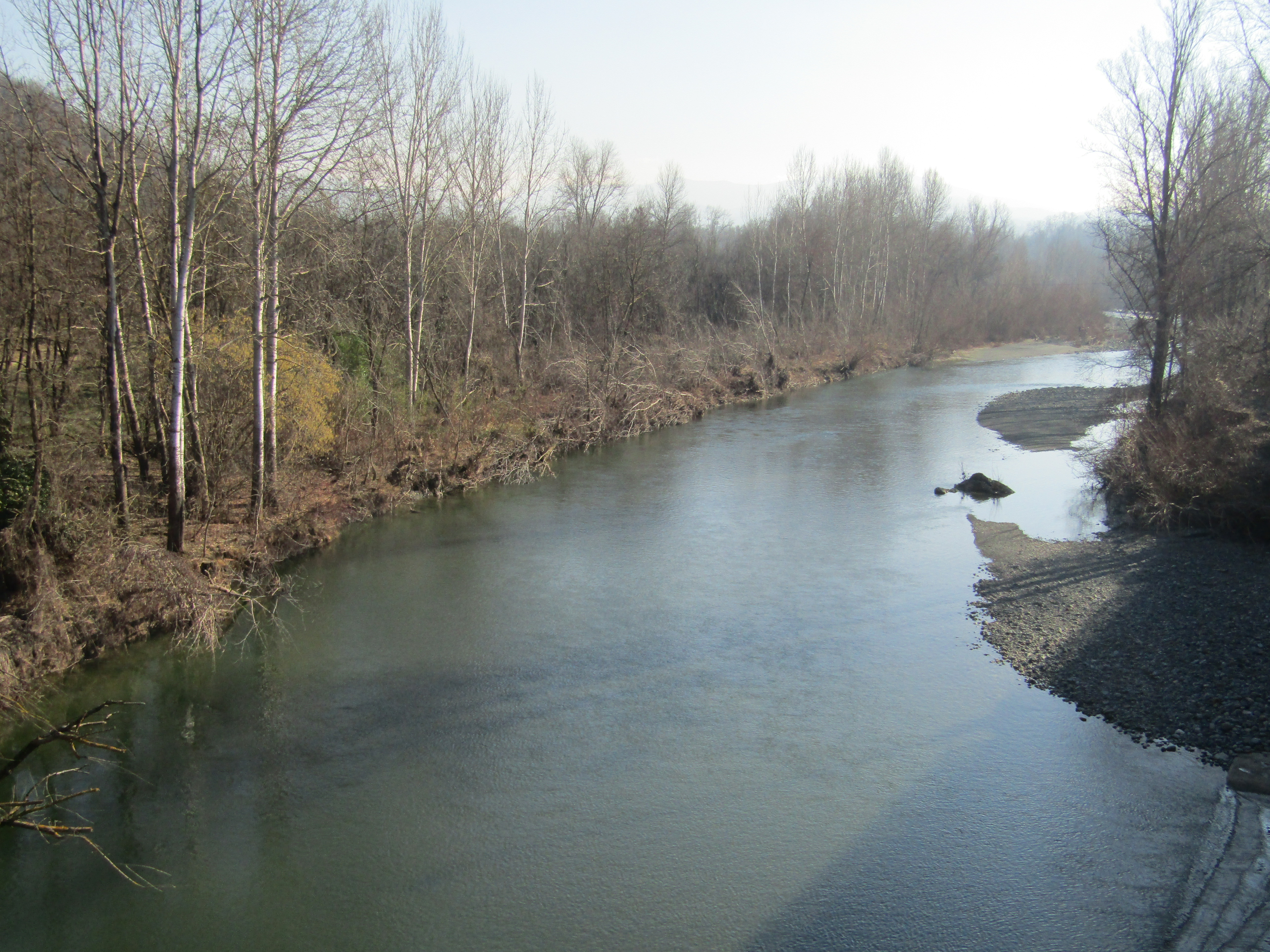
The Piota close to its confluence in the Orba

The Piota passes through the territory of the communes of Bosio, Casaleggio Boiro, Lerma, Tagliolo Monferrato, Silvano d'Orba and Rocca Grimalda. As a tributary of the Orba, the Piota falls within the Po basin.

The river's source is on the Piedmontese flank of Monte Pracaban and its course takes it through the wild landscapes of the Ligurian Apennine that form the Parco Regionale delle Capanne di Marcarolo. Having been joined by the Gorzente, the Piota enters the Orba near Silvano d'Orba.

== Fishing ==
Trout are fished for in the river and it is possible to pan flecks of gold.
