= Laghi di Lavagnina =

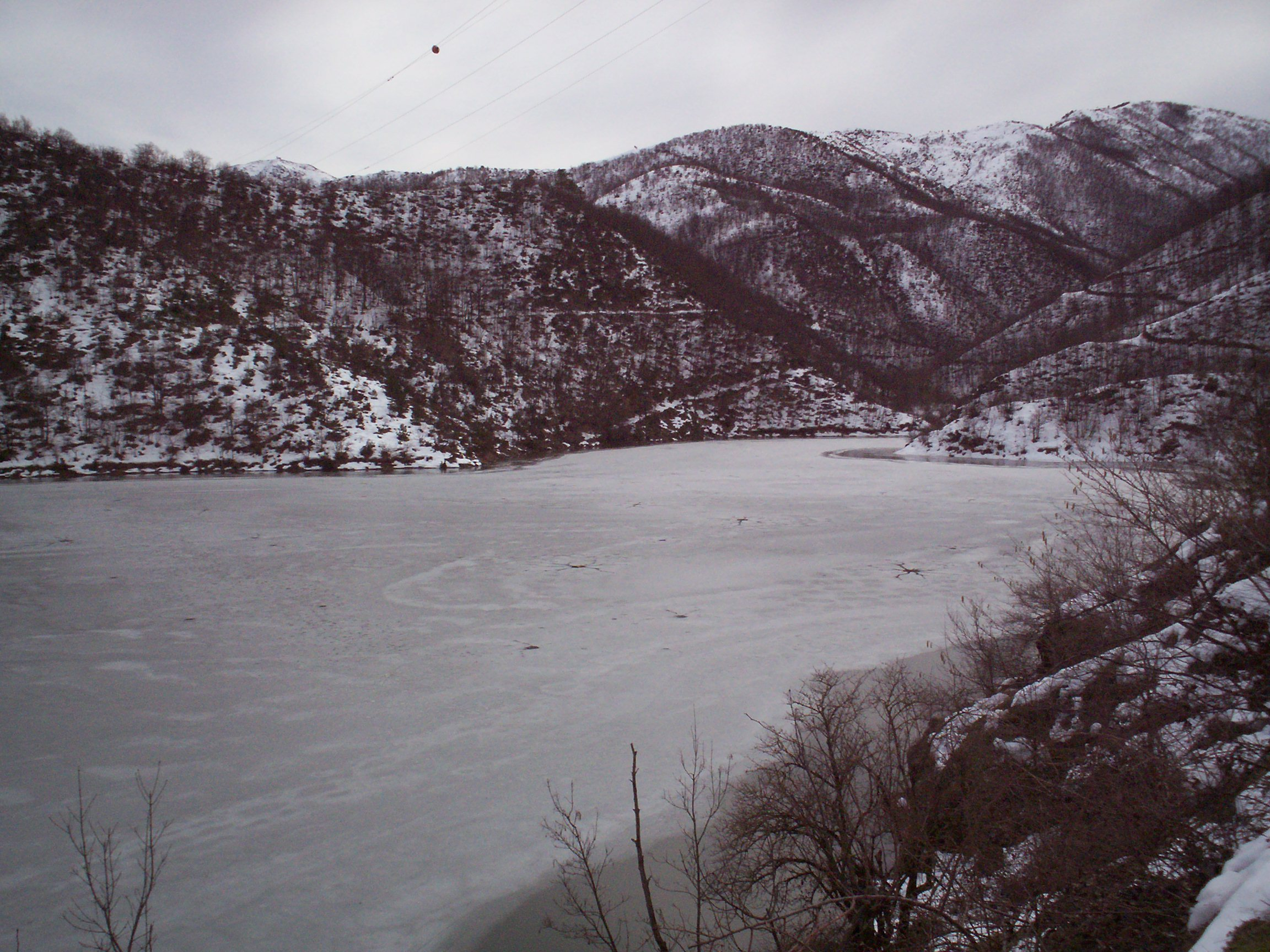
- Winter view of the lower lake

- Location within Piedmont
- Location: Province of Alessandria, Piedmont
- Coordinates: 44.606663°N 8.759558°E
- Type: reservoir
- Primary inflows: Gorzente
- Primary outflows: Gorzente
- Basin countries: Italy
- Surface elevation: 342 m (1,122 ft)

Laghi di Lavagnina are two artificial lakes in the municipalities of Casaleggio Boiro, Mornese and Bosio in the Province of Alessandria, Piedmont, Italy.

== Geography ==
The lowest lake is named Lago Inferiore and the upper one Lago Superiore. Their inflow and outflow stream is Torrente Gorzente.

== Nature conservation ==
The lakes are included in the Piedmontese natural park of the Capanne di Marcarolo.
