= Monte Tobbio =

Mountain in Italy

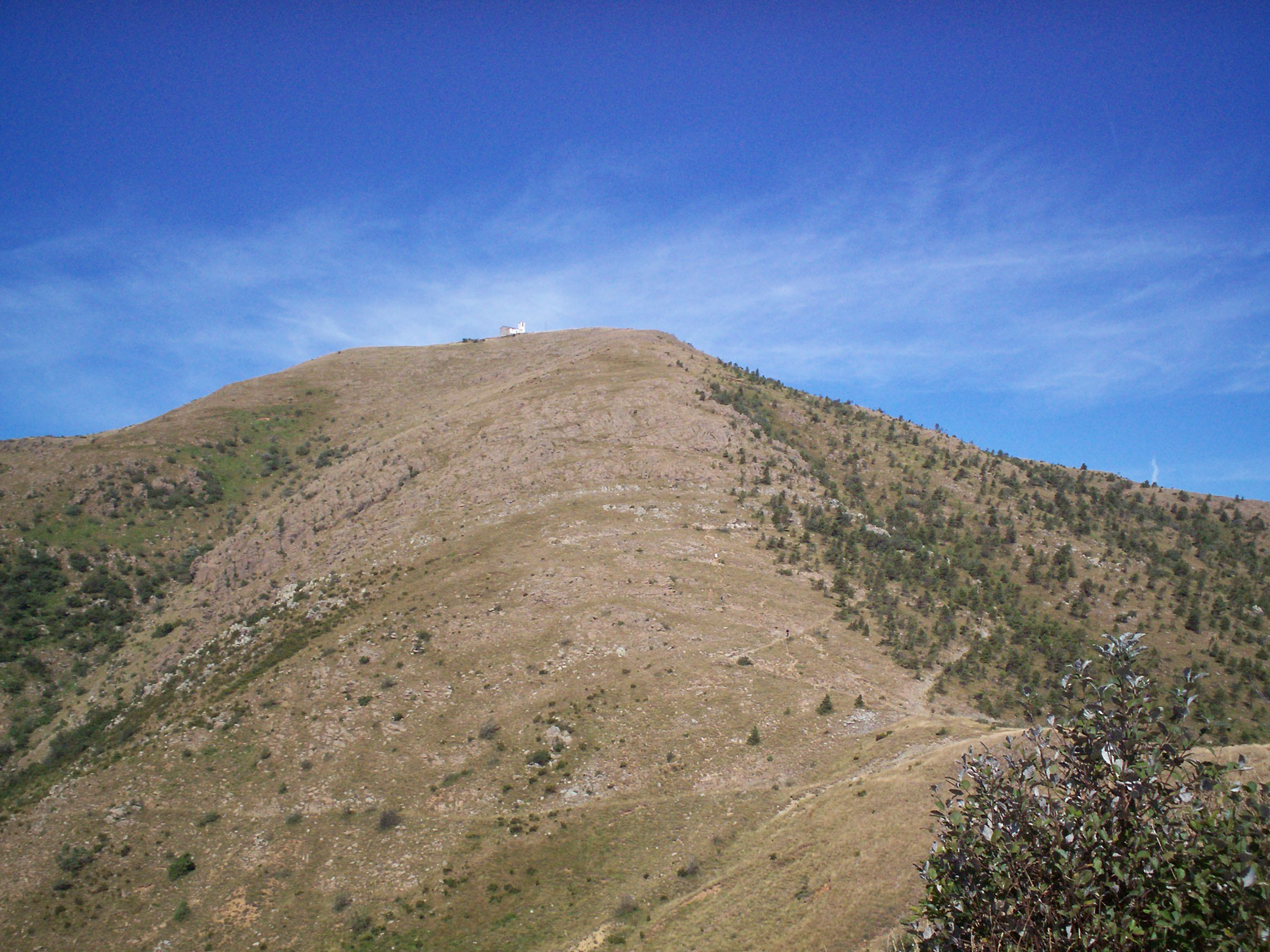
- Monte Tobbio from Dagliola Pass

Highest point
- Elevation: 1,092 m (3,583 ft)
- Prominence: 267
- Coordinates: 44°35′19.04″N 8°48′14.94″E

Naming
- Native name: Monte Tuggiu (Ligurian)

Geography
- Location within Italy
- Location: Liguria, Italy
- Parent range: Ligurian Apennines

Climbing
- First ascent: ancestral
- Easiest route: hike

Monte Tobbio (in Ligurian Monte Tuggiu) is a 1092 metres high mountain of the Apennines, located in the Italian region of Piedmont.

== Geography ==
The mountain stands on the Adriatic side of the drainage divide defined by the Ligurian Apennine. It's the main summit of the ridge which, starting from Monte delle Figne, goes North dividing Gorzente and Lemme valleys. Administratively mount Tobbio belongs to the municipality of Bosio (province of Alessandria, Piedmont).

Due to its prominent location Monte Tobbio is very easily recognisable from large areas both of the Ligurian Apennine and Po plain.

=== Environment ===
Monte Tobbio slopes are generally rocky and almost barren due to the poor soil formed by its peridotites bedrock.

Since 1979 the mountain belongs to the Capanne di Marcarolo regional natural park. The mountain and its surrounding area are also part of a SIC (Site of Community Importance) called "Capanne di Marcarolo" (code: IT1180026).

== History ==
On the summit stands a little church dedicated to Our Lady of Caravaggio. It was built in 1892 and rebuilt after severe damages occurred during the world War II.

In 1944's spring a group of Italian partisans were surrounded by fascist and nazi troops on mount Tobbio. After a fight some of them managed to break the blockade while some others, after being captured, were transported near the Benedicta Abbey and executed by firing squads on April the 7th 1944.

== Access to the summit ==
Monte Tobbio can be reached by signposted footpaths departing from Voltaggio or Bosio. It can also be accessed by a longer path from Monte delle Figne, while the shortest way to climb the mountain from an asphalted road starts from the "Valico degli Eremiti" ("Hermites' pass", m.559) and takes around 1.30 hours walk.

Climbing Monte Tobbio is one of the most popular hikes of SE Piedmont and province of Genoa and in clean days offers an panorama ranging from the Ligurian Sea to a large stretch of the Italian Alps. Some branches of the Club Alpino Italiano (C.A.I.) organize every year night hikes to the mountain, as for instance the local C.A.I. group of Casale Monferrato.

=== Mountain huts ===
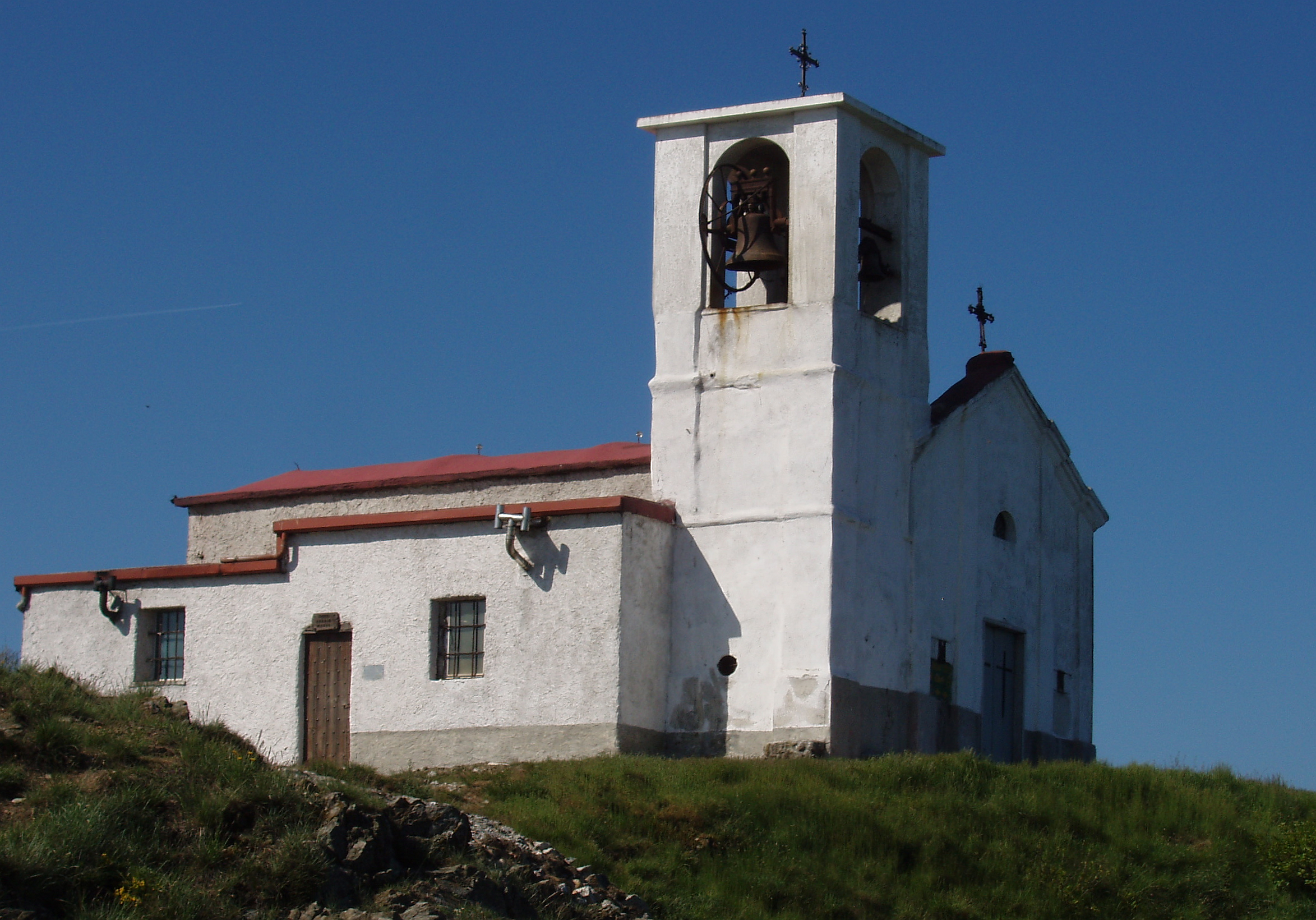
Summit church.

- Maria Santissima di Caravaggio: on the top of the mountain, a room contiguous to the small church can be used as an emergence hut.
- Rifugio Escursionistico Nido Del Biancone, owned by the park and located in Frazione Capanne di Marcarolo (Bosio).
