= Parco naturale delle Capanne di Marcarolo =

Regional natural park in Piedmont, Italy

Coordinates: 44.6333°N 8.8500°E

Capanne di Marcarolo Natural Regional Park
- Parco naturale delle Capanne di Marcarolo
- IUCN category IV (habitat/species management area)
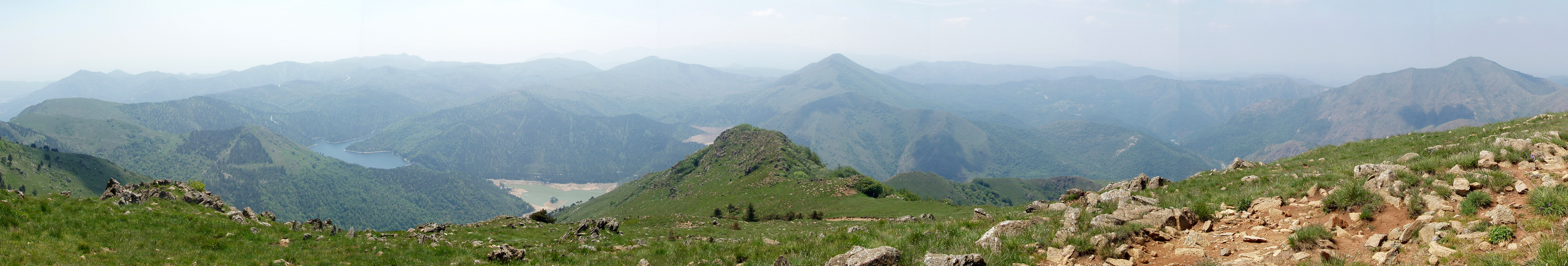
- The park as seen from monte delle Figne

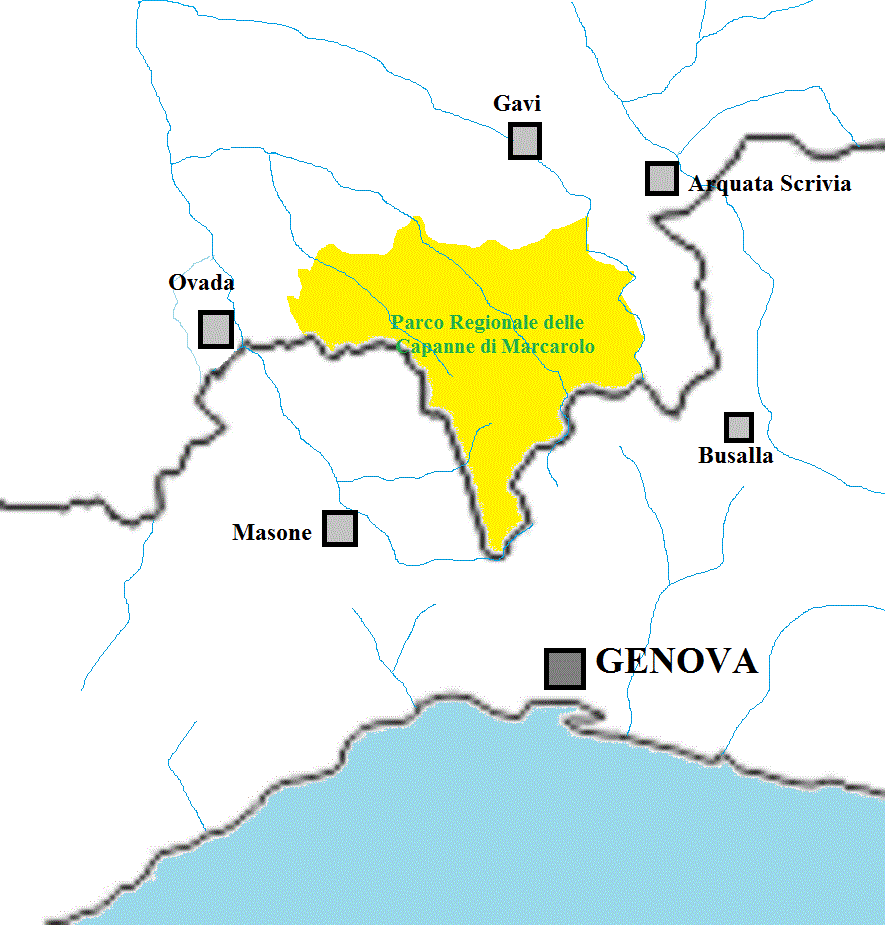
- Location: Province of Alessandria, Italy
- Nearest city: Genova
- Area: 8,216 ha (20,300 acres)
- Established: 1979
- Governing body: Ente di gestione delle Aree protette Appennino piemontese, (Bosio)
- Website: www.areeprotetteappenninopiemontese.it

The Capanne di Marcarolo Natural Regional Park (in Italian Parco naturale delle Capanne di Marcarolo) is a natural park in the province of Alessandria (Piedmont, Italy). It gets the name from a small village in the protected area, Capanne di Marcarolo.

== History ==
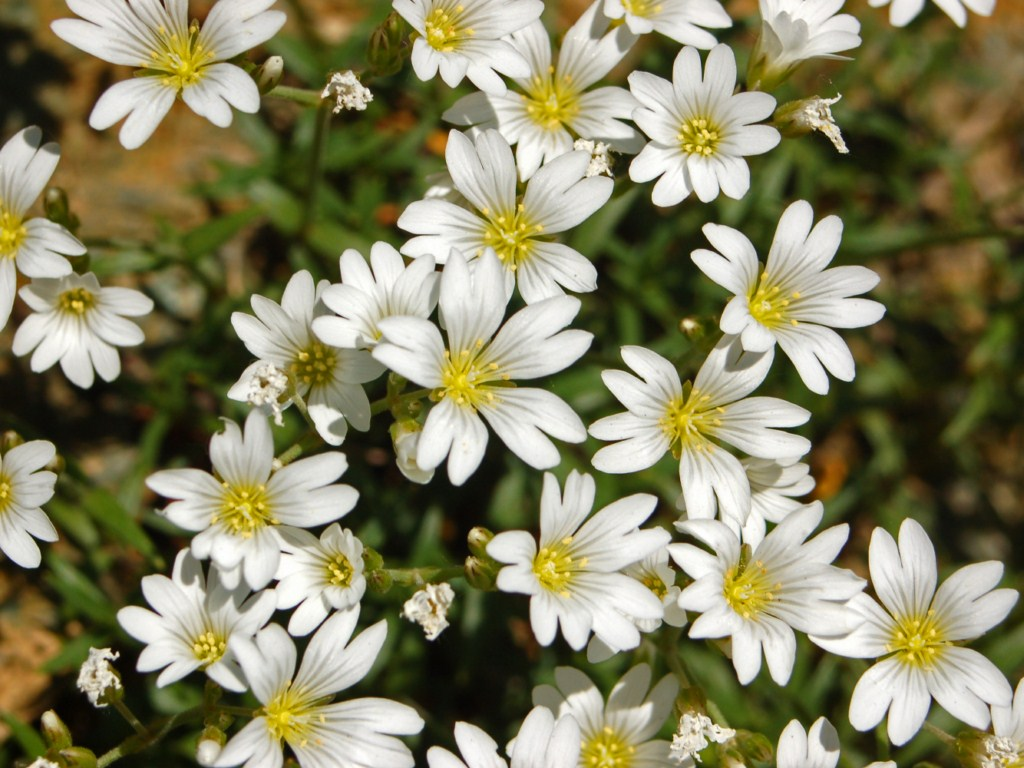
Cerastium utriense, one of the endemisms of the park.

Some artificial lakes located in the park as Laghi del Gorzente were built from the end of 19th century in order to provide the city of Genova and its surrounding area with electricity and good quality freshwater.

In 1944's spring a group of Italian partisans were surrounded by fascist and nazi troops on Monte Tobbio. After a fight some of them managed to break the blockade while some others were captured, transferred near Benedicta Abbey and executed by firing squads on 7 April 1944.

The natural park was established by the l.r. (regional law, in Italian legge regionale) nr. 53 of August the 31st 1979 as modified by the l.r. nr. 13 of January the 23rd 1989. The park area is also included in a SIC (Site of Community Importance) called Capanne di Marcarolo (code: IT1180026). The SIC is larger than the park, and reaches a surface of 9548.78 ha.

== Geography ==
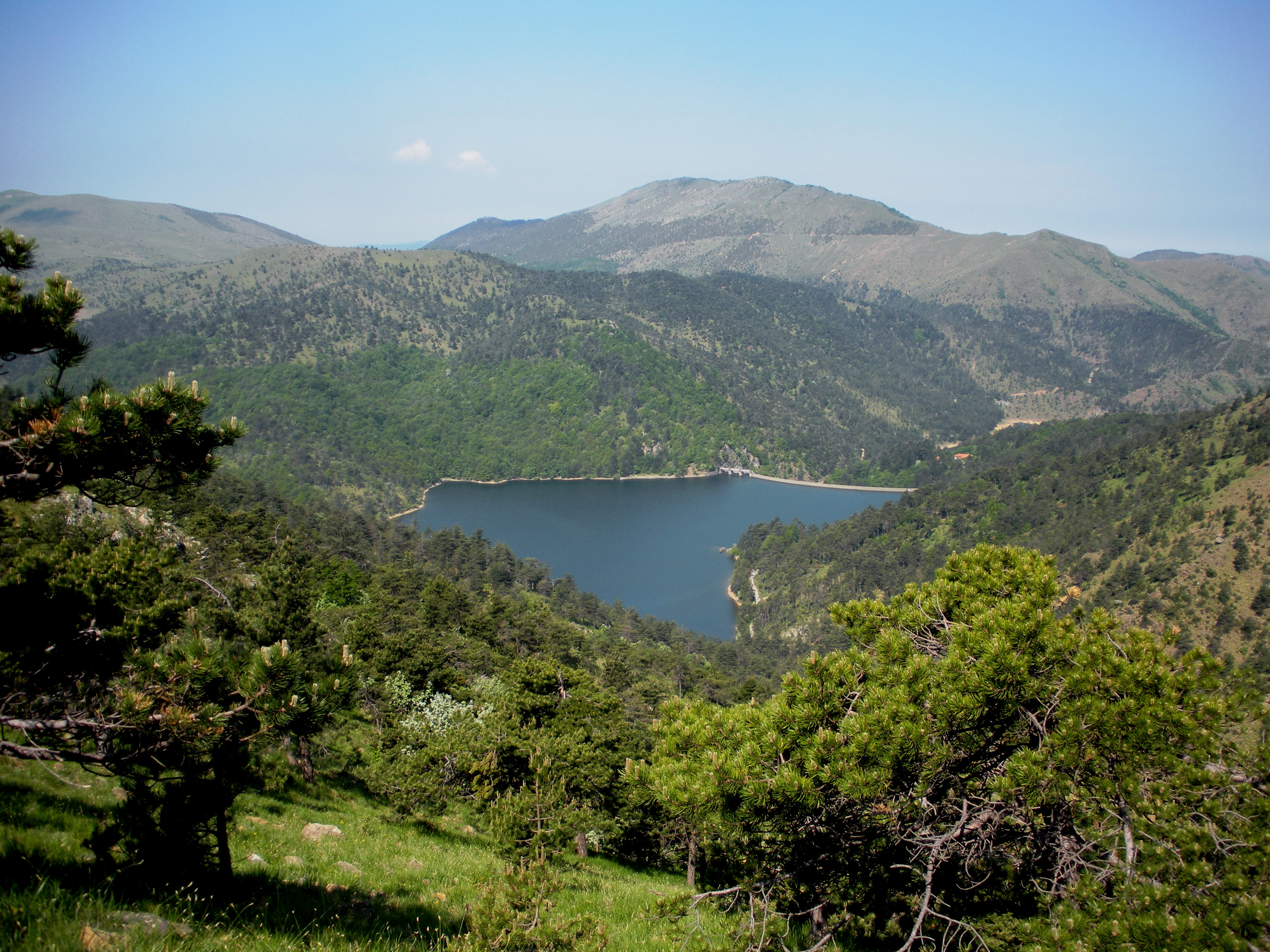
Gorzente lakes:Lago Lungo.

Situated in the inland of the Italian Riviera not faraway from Genova, the park protects a scenic portion of the Ligurian Apennines. The protected area is administratively part of Piedmont and is located near the border line of the region with Liguria, north of the Apenninic watershed dividing Pianura Padana (tributary of the Adriatic Sea) from the Ligurian Sea drainage basin. It covers over 82 square kilometres (32 mi^{2}).

The park encompasses some tributary valleys of the Po river:

- part of Lemme valley (east of the park),
- Gorzente and Piota valleys (centre),
- a small portion of Stura di Ovada valley (west of the park).

=== Concerned municipalities ===
The natural park is shared among seven different municipalities:

- Bosio,
- Casaleggio Boiro,
- Fraconalto,
- Lerma,
- Mornese,
- Tagliolo Monferrato,
- Voltaggio.

=== Main summits of the park ===
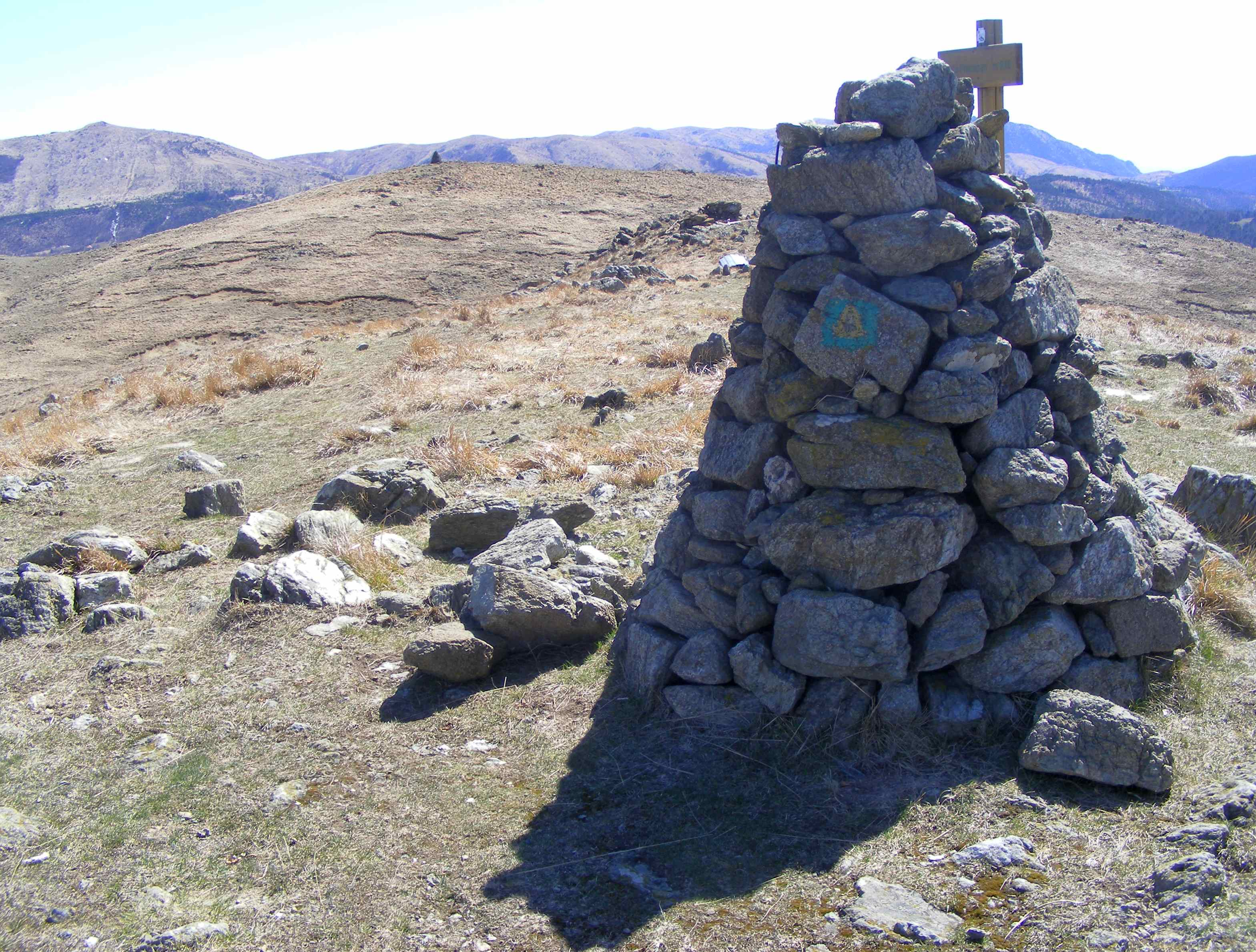
Summit cairn on Monte Pracaban.

Among the highest summits located in the park can be cited Monte Pracaban (946 m), Monte delle Figne (1172 m), Monte Taccone (1113 m) and Monte Leco (1072 m), located on its Southern borders of the park, and Monte Tobbio (1092 m), near the centre of the protected area.

== Geology ==
Park geology is mostly tied to the Gruppo di Voltri. In this area the collision between the African and the Eurasian Plates produced a huge amount of effusive rocks, now mostly represented by peridotites and serpentinites. The peculiar soils formed by degradation of peridoties bedrock and a large variety of micro-habitats in the protected area allow the presence of rare endemic plants, as Viola bertolonii or Cerastium utriense.

Some gold mines, now abandoned, have been exploited near Cascina Ferriere and in other surrounding locations.

== Wildlife ==
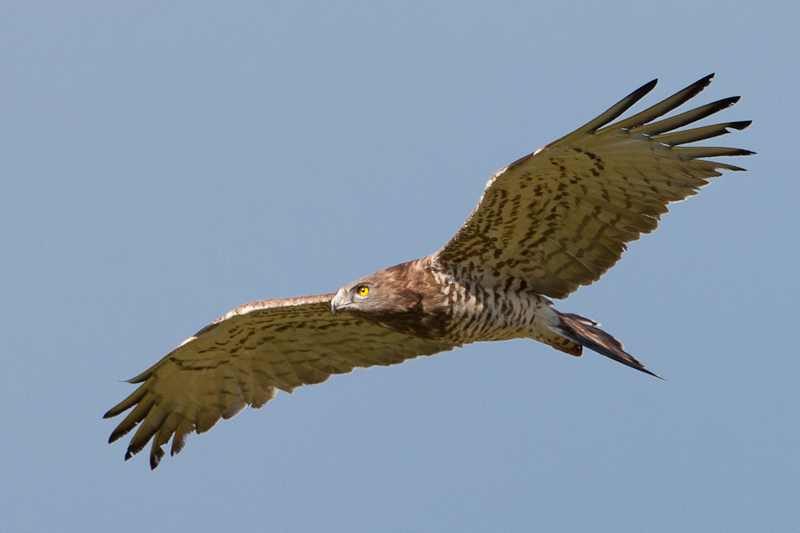
Short-toed snake eagle, the park symbol

Among animals is to be highlighted a wide reptiles' and amphibia's biodiversity: in the park have been found eight different species of snakes and in the obscurity of the old mines dwells the endemic Speleomantes strinatii, at first considered a subspecies of the Italian cave salamander and now a self-standing species.

In the streams lives not only the brown trout but also the endangered white-clawed crayfish, observed in Lemme Valley. Park's forests offer a suitable habitat to wild boars, foxes, badgers, fat dormouses, bats, roe deer, fallow deer, European hedgehogs, beech martens and hares.

Located on a crowded migratory route the park offers nesting places to many bird species. Among birds of prey must be noted the short-toed snake eagle (in Italian Biancone), a species very endangered in Italy which was chosen as the symbol of the park. Many common buzzards' couples also nest in the protected area.

== Transport ==
Capanne di Marcarolo park can be reached by car via motorway (Autostrada A26 Voltri-Sempione or Autostrada A7 Genoa-Milan). The closest railway stations are in Serravalle Scrivia and Arquata Scrivia.

== Hiking ==
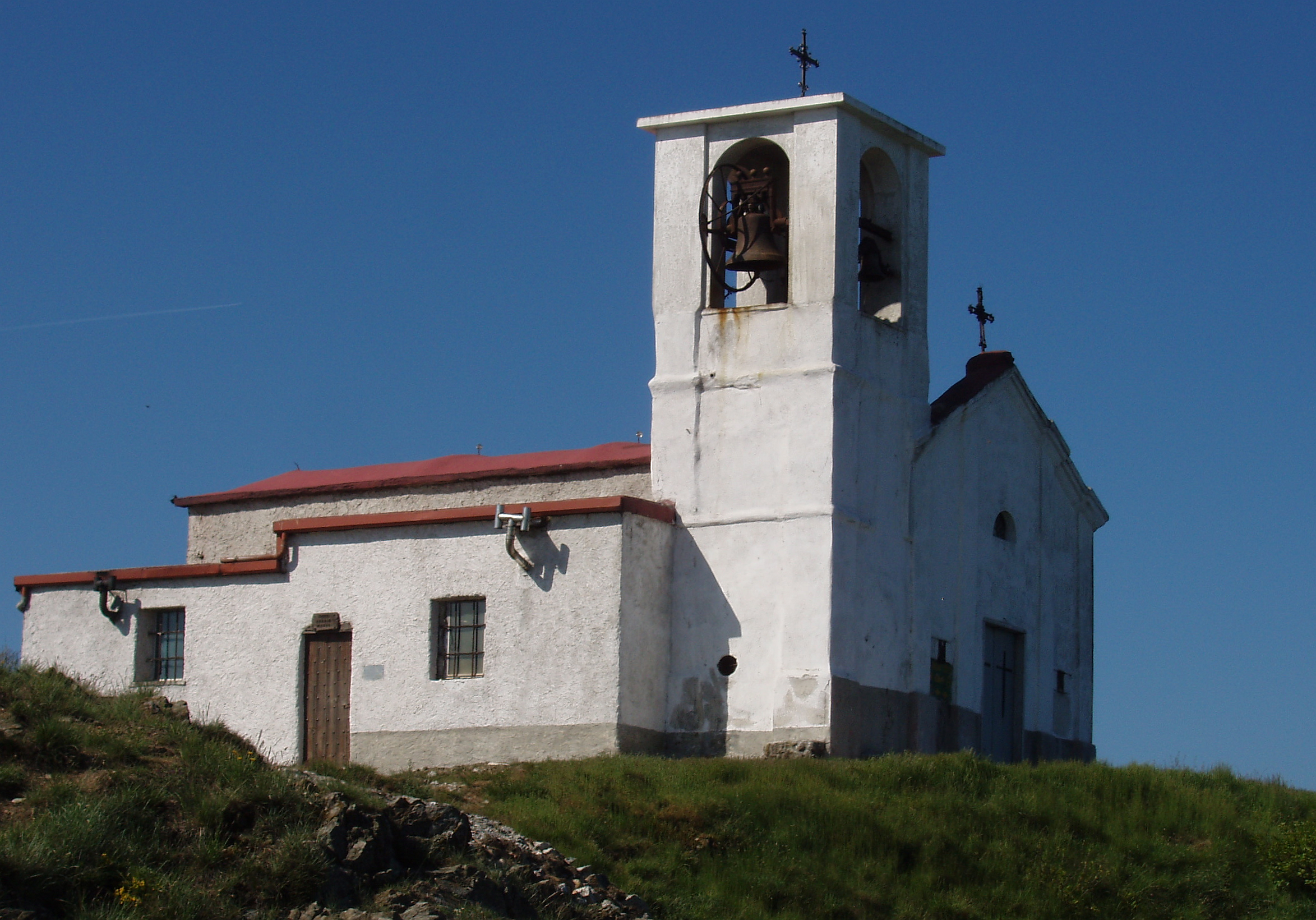
Summit church of Monte Tobbio.

A large network of footpaths, mostly signposted by F.I.E. (Federazione Italiana Escursionismo, Hiking Italian Federation) is available within the park. Two mountain hut can be used by hikers:

- Maria Santissima di Caravaggio, on the top of Monte Tobbio: a room contiguous to the small church can be used as an emergence hut.
- Rifugio Escursionistico Nido Del Biancone, owned by the park and located in Frazione Capanne di Marcarolo (Bosio).

== Bibliography ==
- Stefano Ardito (2006). Guida al Parco naturale delle Capanne di Marcarolo (in Italian). Erredì Grafiche Editoriali. ISBN 88-95023-00-5.
