= Doria Castle (Mornese) =

Castle in Piedmont, Italy

- Castello Doria
- Mornese, Piedmont, Italy
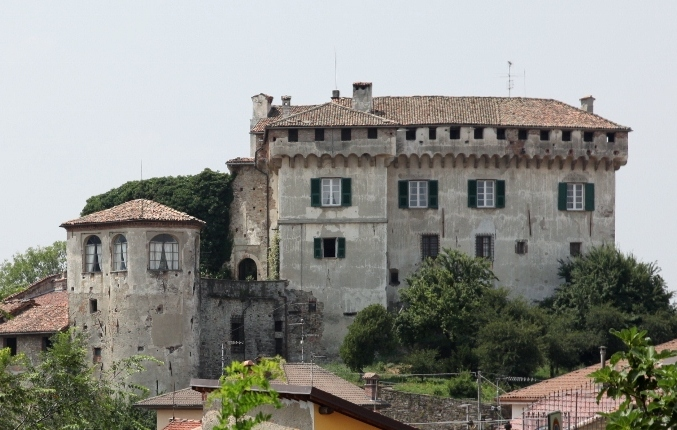
- Doria Castle in 2010

Site information
- Type: Castle

Location
- Coordinates: 44°38′18.77″N 8°45′21.08″E

Doria Castle (Italian: Castello Doria) is a castle located in Mornese, Piedmont, Italy.

== History ==
The earliest records of the site date back to 1154, when, following the destruction of Tortona, Pope Adrian IV granted control of the territory to Oberto, bishop of Tortona. During the 13th century, the area changed hands several times, and in 1270 it was granted as a fief to the Rosso della Volta family, a Genoese lineage involved in the government of the Republic of Genoa. They were responsible for building the castle, which was erected on the hill of Berguato.

In 1404, the castle was besieged by Genoese troops, who captured and destroyed it, leaving behind only the walls that today still enclose its garden. The castle was later rebuilt by the Genoese themselves. In 1409, the complex was attacked once again, this time by the troops of Facino Cane, while in 1431 Francesco Sforza occupied the fortress. In 1452 it came under the control of the House of Doria, vassals of Genoa, before passing to the House of Gonzaga in 1535.

Both the village and the castle followed the fortunes of the March of Montferrat, successively coming under the control of the Pallavicino, Serra, Spinola, Orsini, and finally the House of Savoy. During the 17th century, the castle changed ownership several times, passing to the Serra family, then to the Spinola, the Orsini, and finally back to the Doria family, who still own it today.

== Gallery ==
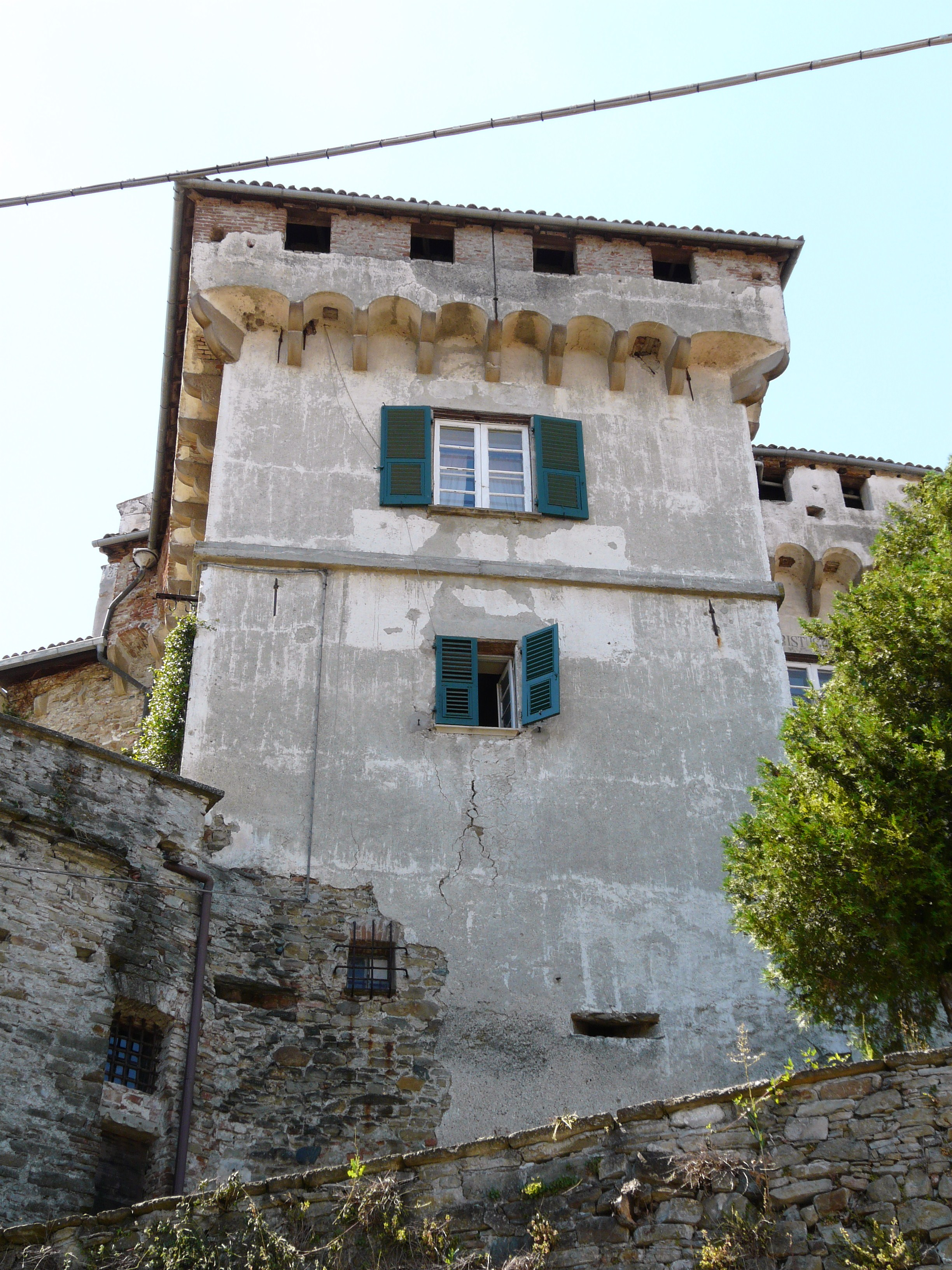

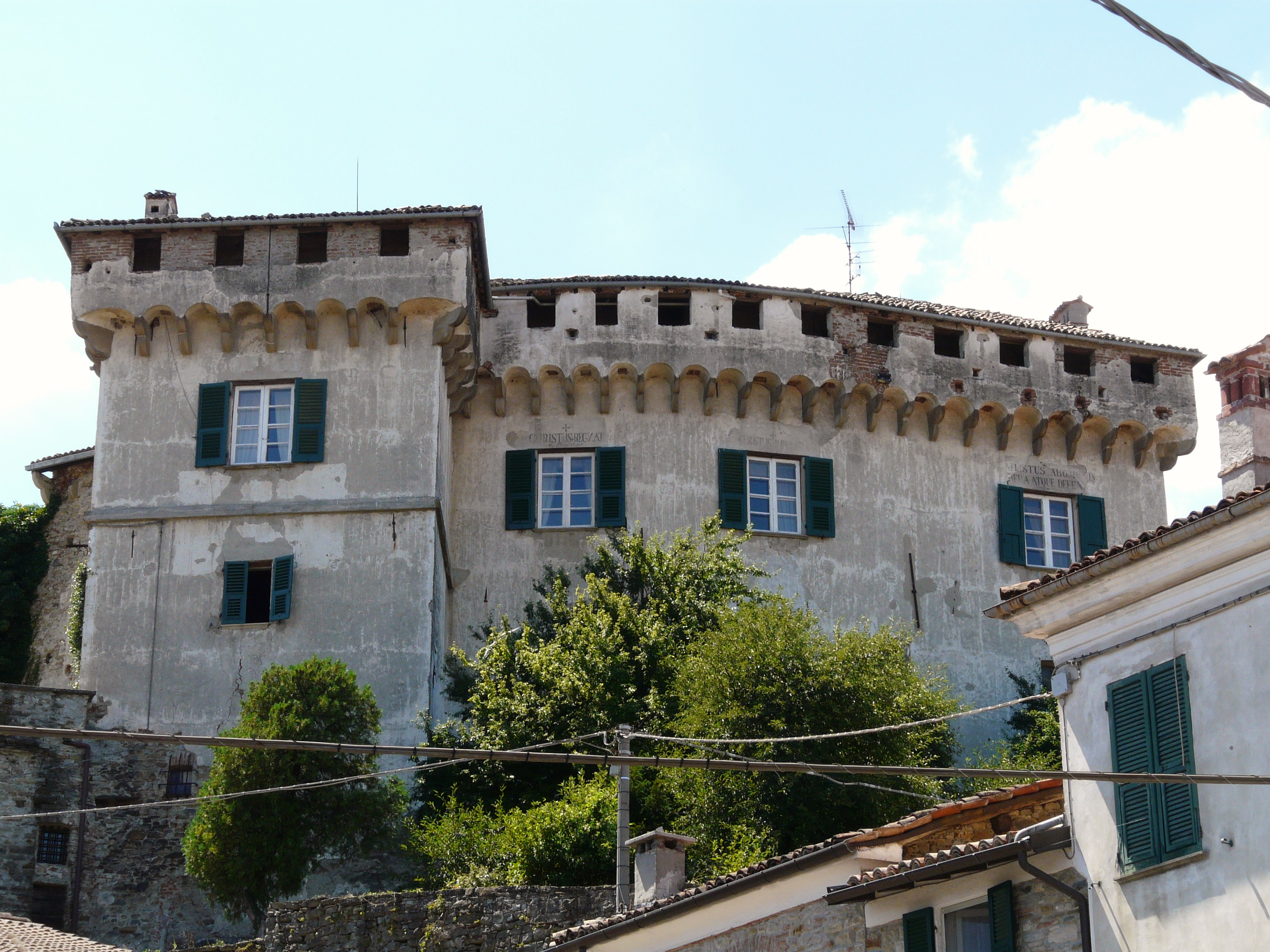

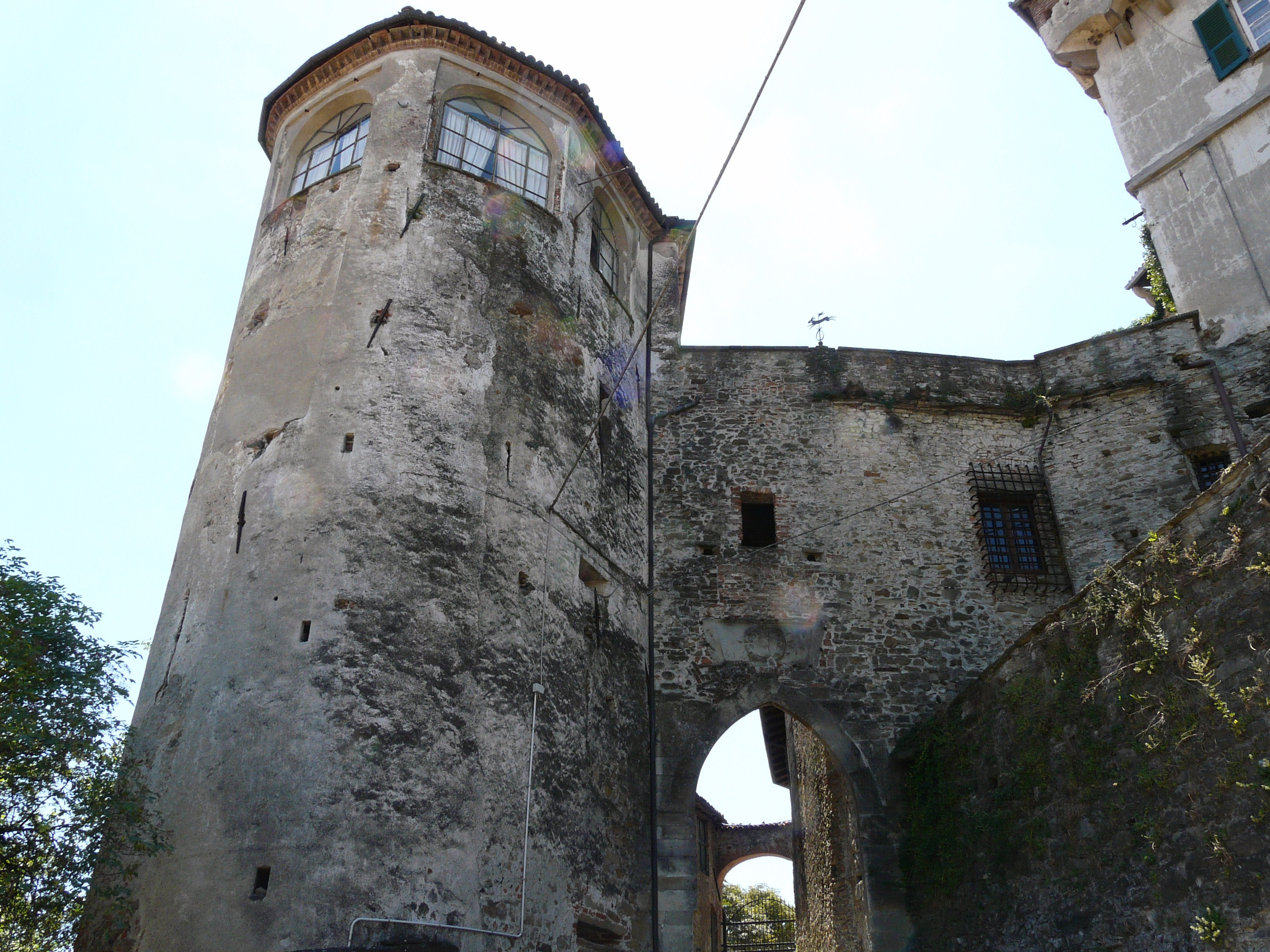
