= Montaldeo =

- Comune
- Comune di Montaldeo
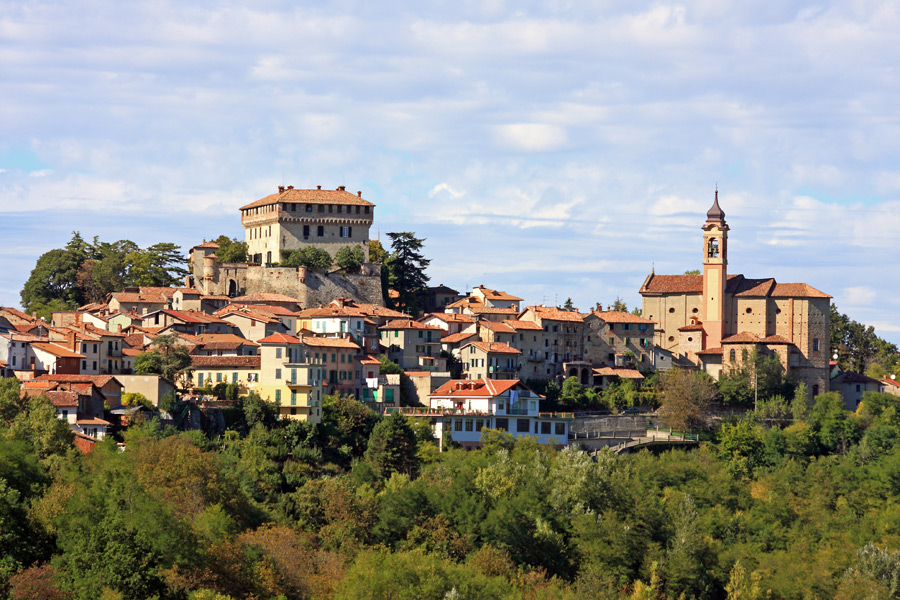

- Location within Italy Location within Piedmont
- Coordinates: 44°39′N 8°53′E
- Country: Italy
- Region: Piedmont
- Province: Alessandria (AL)

Government
  - Mayor: Giovanni Maria Calcagno

Area
  - Total: 5.38 km^{2} (2.08 sq mi)
- Elevation: 332 m (1,089 ft)

Population (30 November 2019)
  - Total: 244
  - Density: 45.4/km^{2} (117/sq mi)
- Demonym: Montaldeesi
- Time zone: UTC+1 (CET)
  - Summer (DST): UTC+2 (CEST)
- Postal code: 15060
- Dialing code: 0143
- Website: Official website

Montaldeo is a comune (municipality) in the Province of Alessandria in the Italian region Piedmont, located about 100 kilometres (62 mi) southeast of Turin and about 35 kilometres (22 mi) southeast of Alessandria.

Montaldeo borders the following municipalities: Casaleggio Boiro, Castelletto d'Orba, Lerma, Mornese, Parodi Ligure, and San Cristoforo.
