= Monte Pracaban =

Mountain in Italy

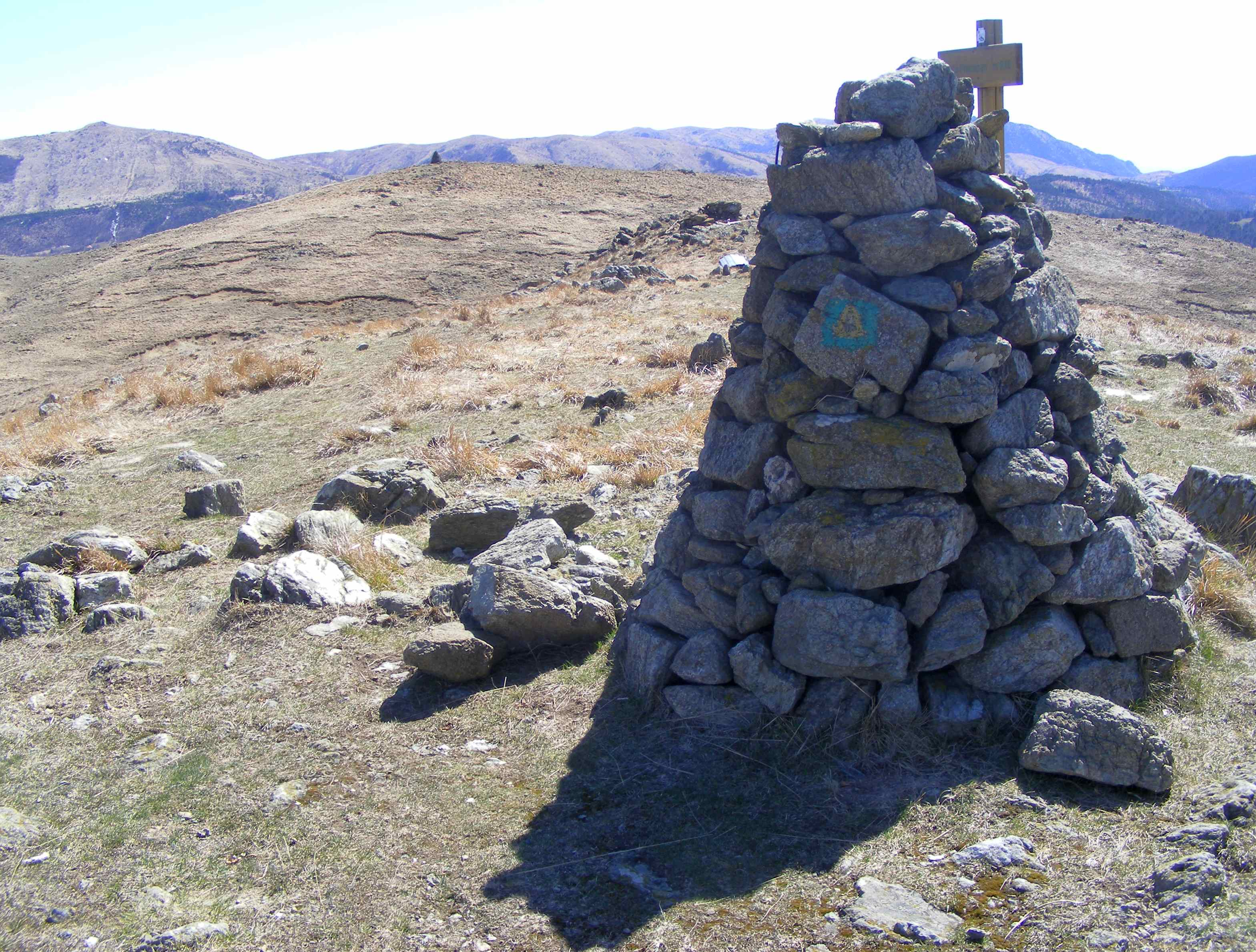
- Summit cairn

Highest point
- Elevation: 946 m (3,104 ft)
- Prominence: 181 m (594 ft)
- Coordinates: 44°33′06″N 8°44′18″E

Geography
- Location within Italy
- Location: Liguria and Piedmont, Italy
- Parent range: Ligurian Apennines

Climbing
- First ascent: ancestral
- Easiest route: hike

Monte Pracaban is a mountain in the Valle Stura, Liguria, northern Italy, part of the Ligurian Apennines.

== Geography ==
The mountain is located on the boundary between the comune of Campo Ligure in Liguria, and that of Bosio in Piedmont.

== Nature conservation ==
The ligurian side of the mountain and its surrounding area are included in a SIC (Site of Community Importance) called Praglia - Pracaban - M. Leco - P. Martin (code IT1331501). Its NE slopes are included in the Piedmontese natural park of the Capanne di Marcarolo.
