= Monte Leco =

Mountain in Italy

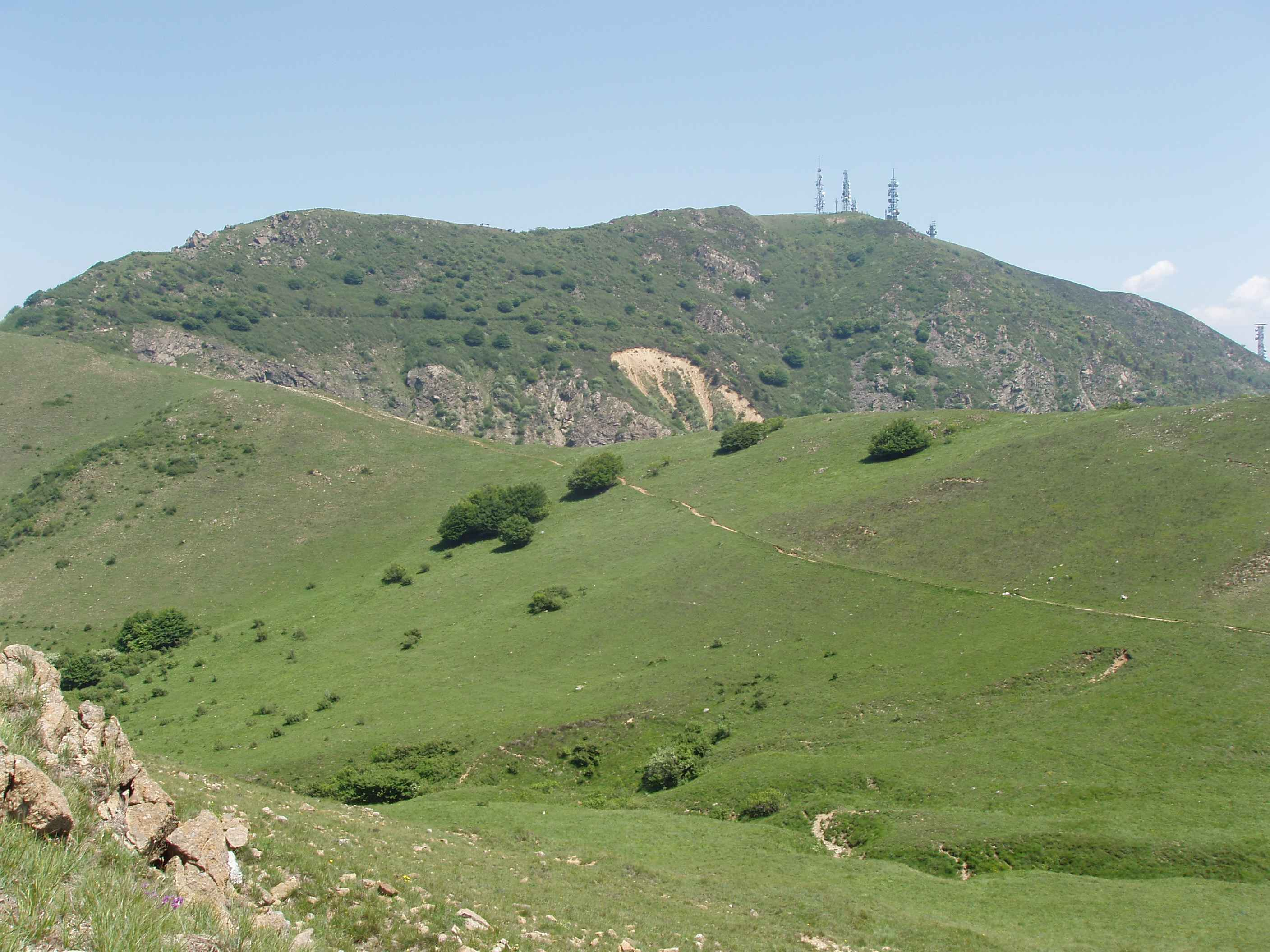

Highest point
- Elevation: 1,072 m (3,517 ft)
- Prominence: 152 m (499 ft)
- Coordinates: 44°33′51″N 8°52′24″E

Geography
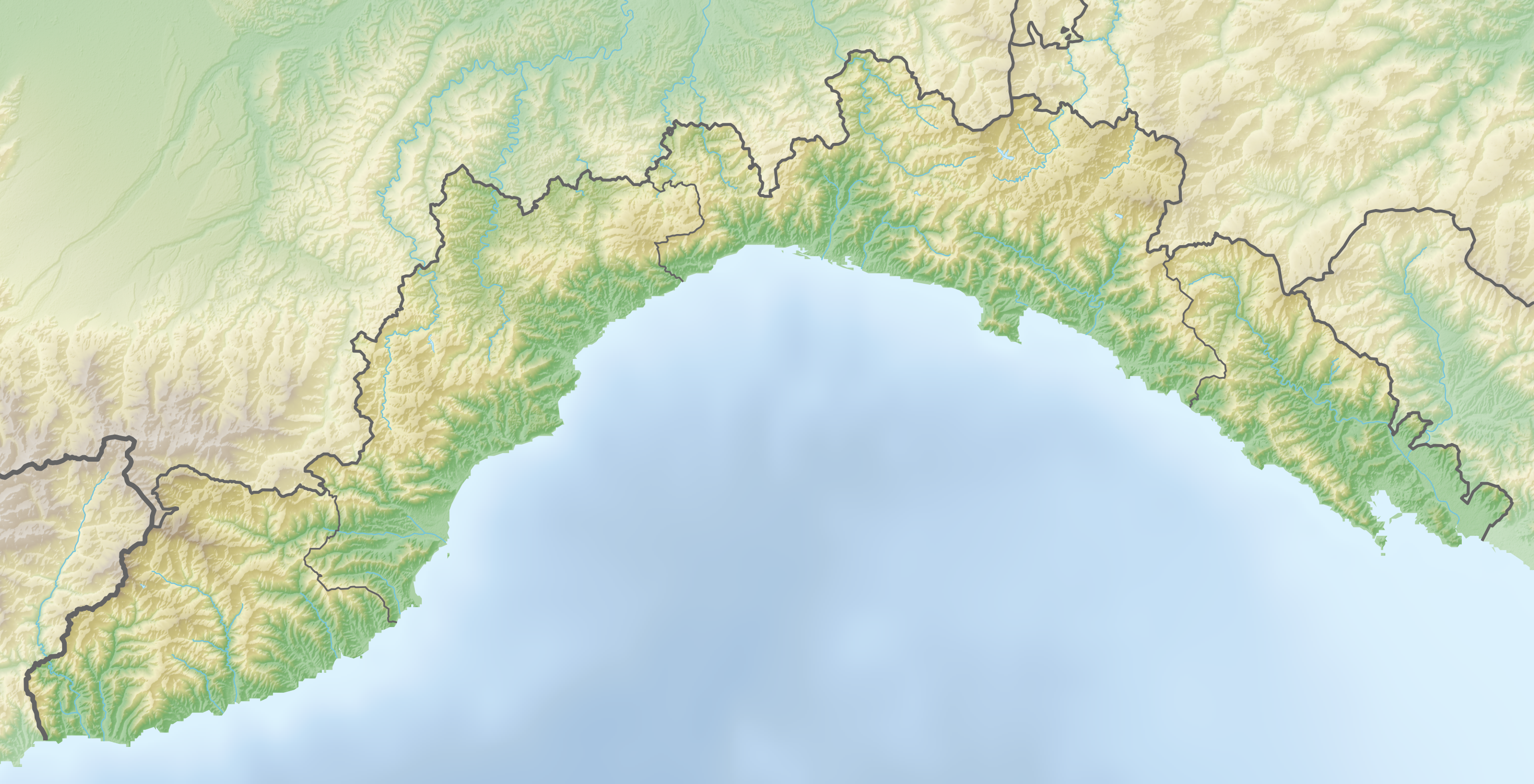
- Location within Liguria Location within Piedmont Location within Italy
- Location: Liguria, Italy; Piedmont, Italy
- Parent range: Ligurian Apennines

Climbing
- First ascent: ancestral
- Easiest route: dirt road

Monte Leco is a mountain in Liguria, northern Italy, part of the Ligurian Apennines. It is located in the provinces of Genoa and Alessandria. It lies at an altitude of 1072 metres.

== Access to the summit ==
The mountain is easily accessible by signposted tracks departing from Bocchetta Pass or Isoverde (municipality of Campomorone).

The Alta Via dei Monti Liguri, a long-distance trail from Ventimiglia (province of Imperia) to Bolano (province of La Spezia), passes very close to the mountain's summit.

== Nature conservation ==
The mountain and its surrounding area are part of a SIC (Site of Community Importance) called Praglia – Pracaban – M. Leco – P. Martin (code: IT1331501). Its northern slopes are included in the Piedmontese natural park of the Capanne di Marcarolo.
