= Monte delle Figne =

Mountain in Italy

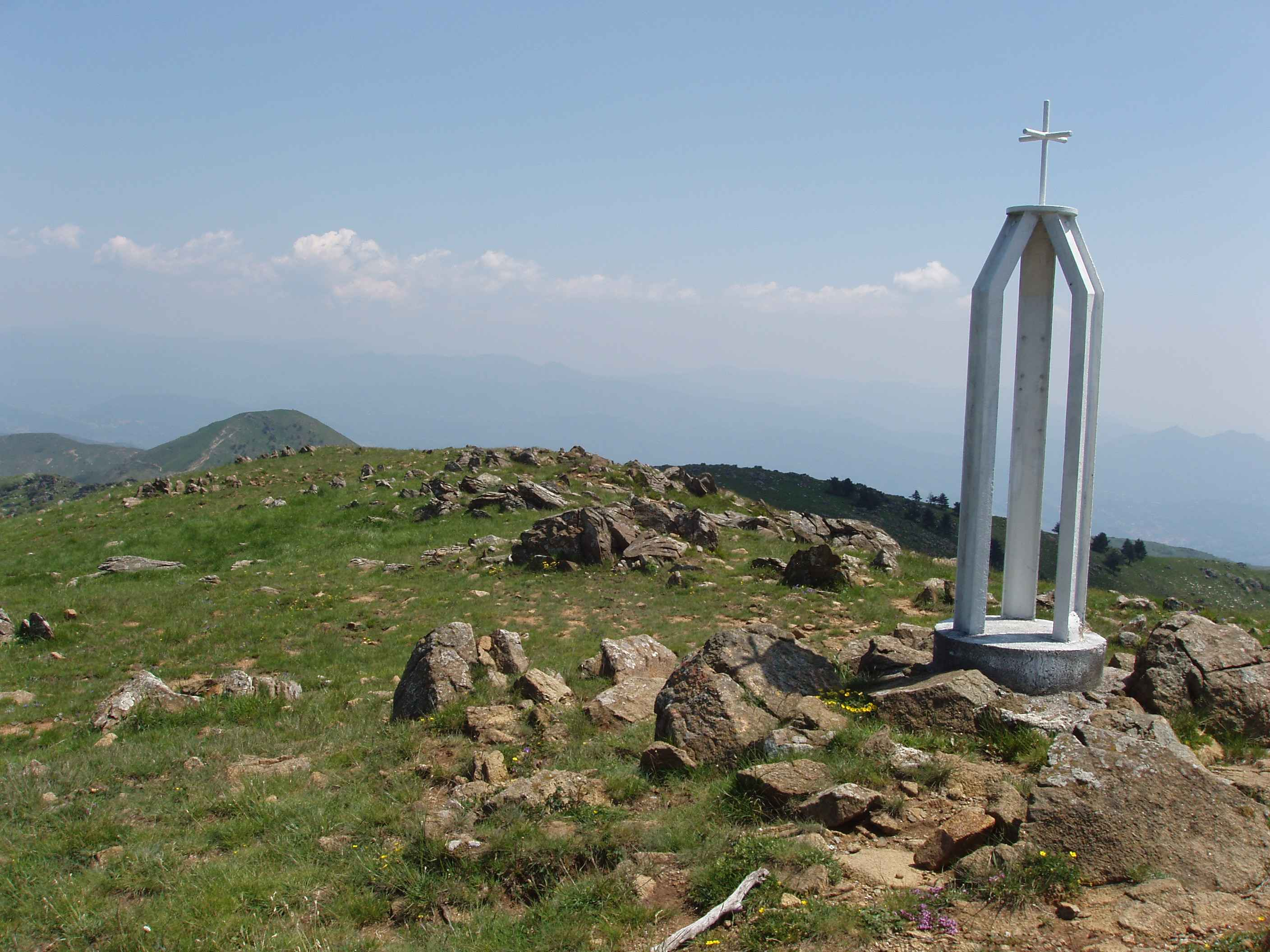
- The cross on the mountain's top

Highest point
- Elevation: 1,172 m (3,845 ft)
- Prominence: 587 m (1,926 ft)
- Isolation: 18.28 km (11.36 mi)
- Coordinates: 44°33′51″N 8°50′08″E

Geography
- Location within Italy
- Location: Liguria and Piedmont, Italy
- Parent range: Ligurian Apennines

Climbing
- First ascent: ancestral
- Easiest route: hike

Monte delle Figne (Figne Mountain) is a mountain in Liguria, northern Italy, part of the Ligurian Apennines. It lies at an altitude of 1172 metres.

== Geography ==
The mountain is located in the provinces of Genoa and Alessandria. Is divided by Passo Mezzano (1063 m) from Monte Taccone and by Passo della Dagliola (858 m) and a saddle near Cascina Carrosina (825 m) from Monte Tobbio.

== Access to the summit ==
Monte delle Figne is accessible by signposted tracks departing from Bocchetta Pass or Isoverde (municipality of Campomorone).

The Alta Via dei Monti Liguri, a long-distance trail from Ventimiglia (province of Imperia) to Bolano (province of La Spezia), passes very close to the mountain's summit.

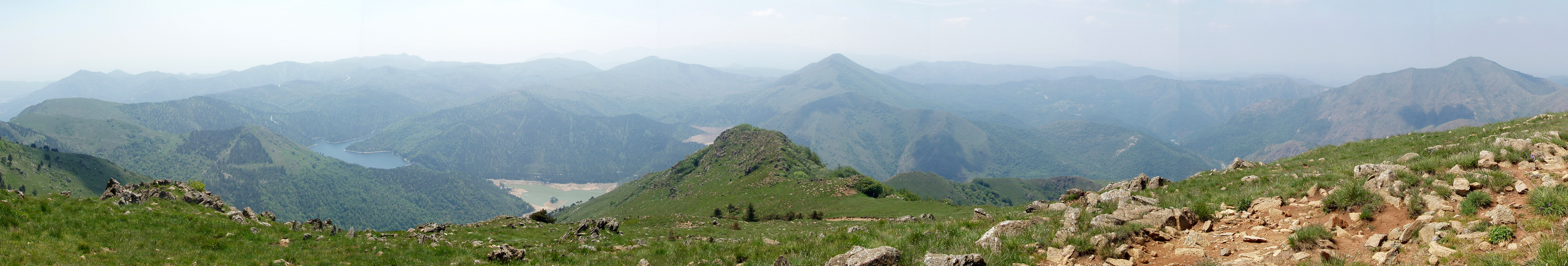
View from the summit: Laghi del Gorzente on the left, Monte Tobbio on the right

== Nature conservation ==
North-western slopes of the mountain are included in the Capanne di Marcarolo Piedmontese natural park.
