= Tagliolo Monferrato Castle =

Castle in Piedmont, Italy

- Castello di Tagliolo Monferrato
- Tagliolo Monferrato, Piedmont, Italy
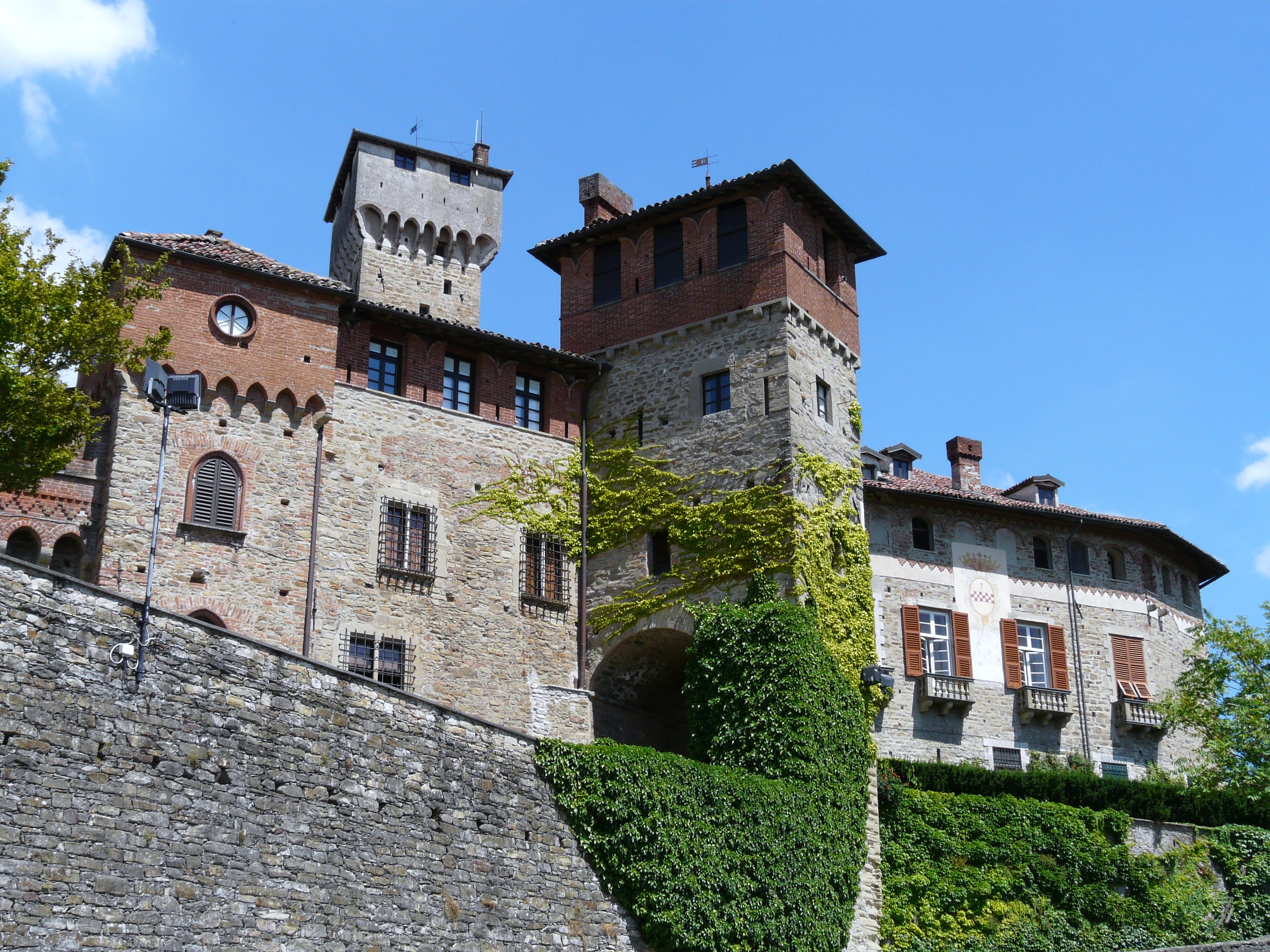
- Tagliolo Monferrato Castle in 2010

Site information
- Type: Castle

Location
- Location within Italy
- Coordinates: 44°38′21.06″N 8°40′09.79″E

Tagliolo Monferrato Castle (Italian: Castello di Tagliolo Monferrato) is a castle located in Tagliolo Monferrato, Piedmont, Italy.

== History ==
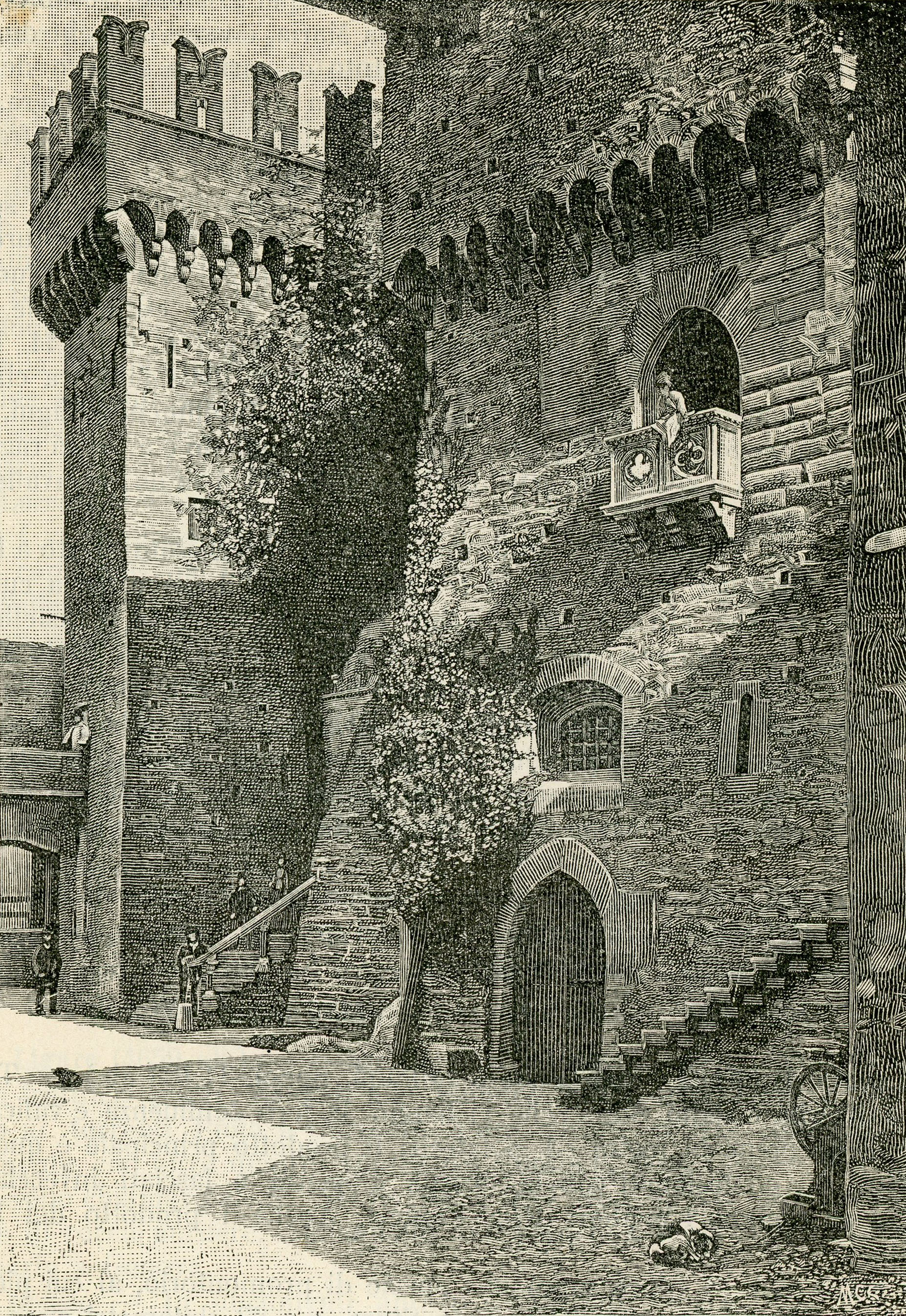
The castle in a late 19th century xylography

The origins of the castle date back to the second half of the 10th century, when it served as a watchtower; the earliest documented mention of the site of Tagliolo is from 976, around the time when Otto the Great granted the Marquis Aleramo I the fief of Monferrat. In the following centuries, the village and castle came under the control of the Oberdendo, Del Bosco, Malaspina, Doria families, and the Republic of Genoa, which exploited its strategic position in Piedmont.

In 1498, the area came under the influence of the Duchy of Milan, which granted it as a fief to the Gentile family, who were awarded the title of Counts of Tagliolo. In the 17th century, the military structure was converted into a noble residence. In 1750, with the marriage of Teresa Gentile and Costantino Pinelli, the fief passed to the Pinelli-Gentile family, whose descendants still hold the title of Marquises and Lords of Tagliolo. At the end of the 19th century, the castle was restored by architect Alfredo d’Andrade.

== Description ==
The castle is distinguished by its square tower, the oldest part of the structure, whose foundations correspond to the early medieval core of the complex; the current upper section, reaching a height of 38 metres, was built between the 15th and 16th centuries. In the courtyard, part of the 14th-century keep is visible, featuring the machicolations of the medieval drawbridge.

== Gallery ==
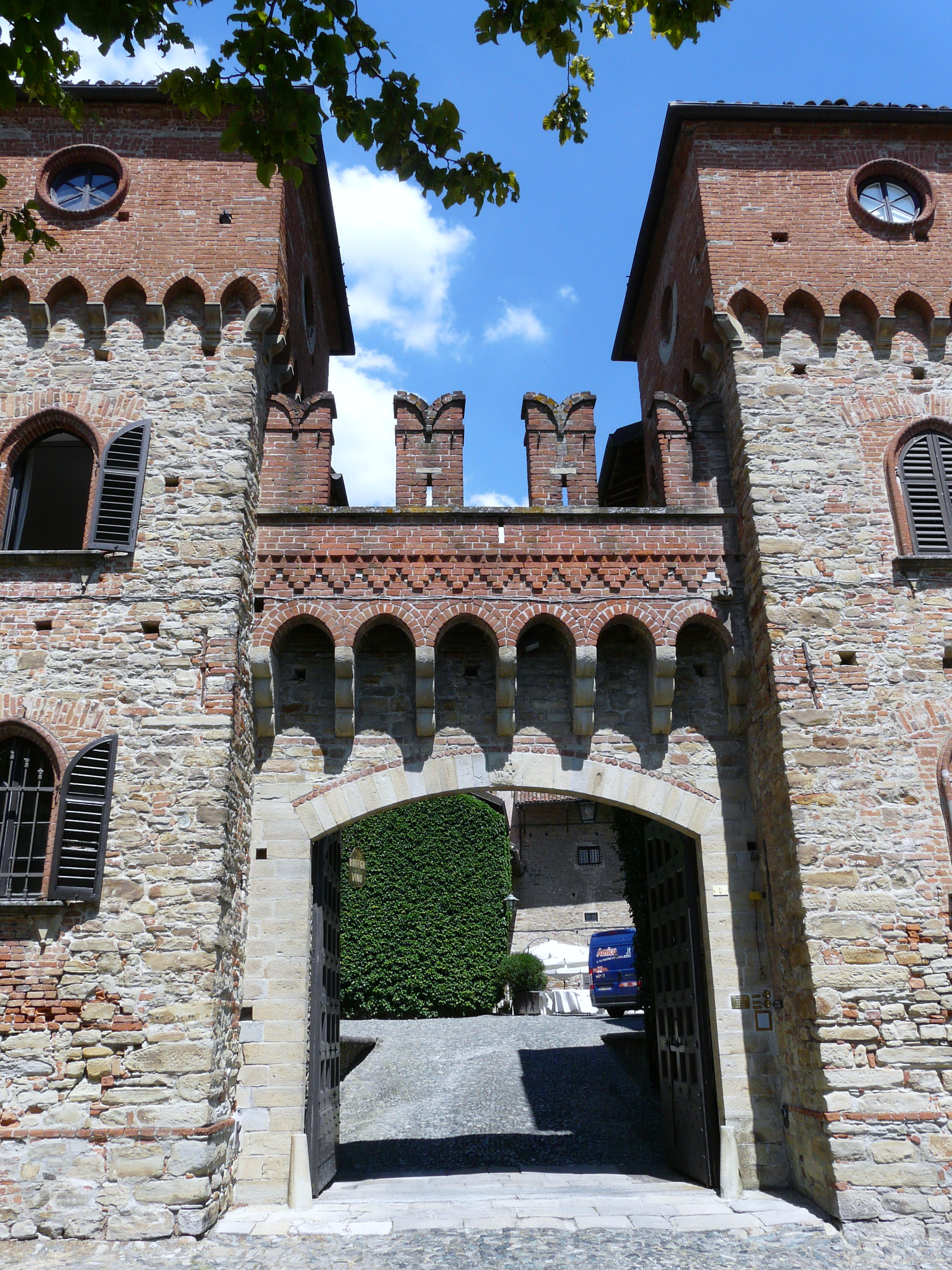

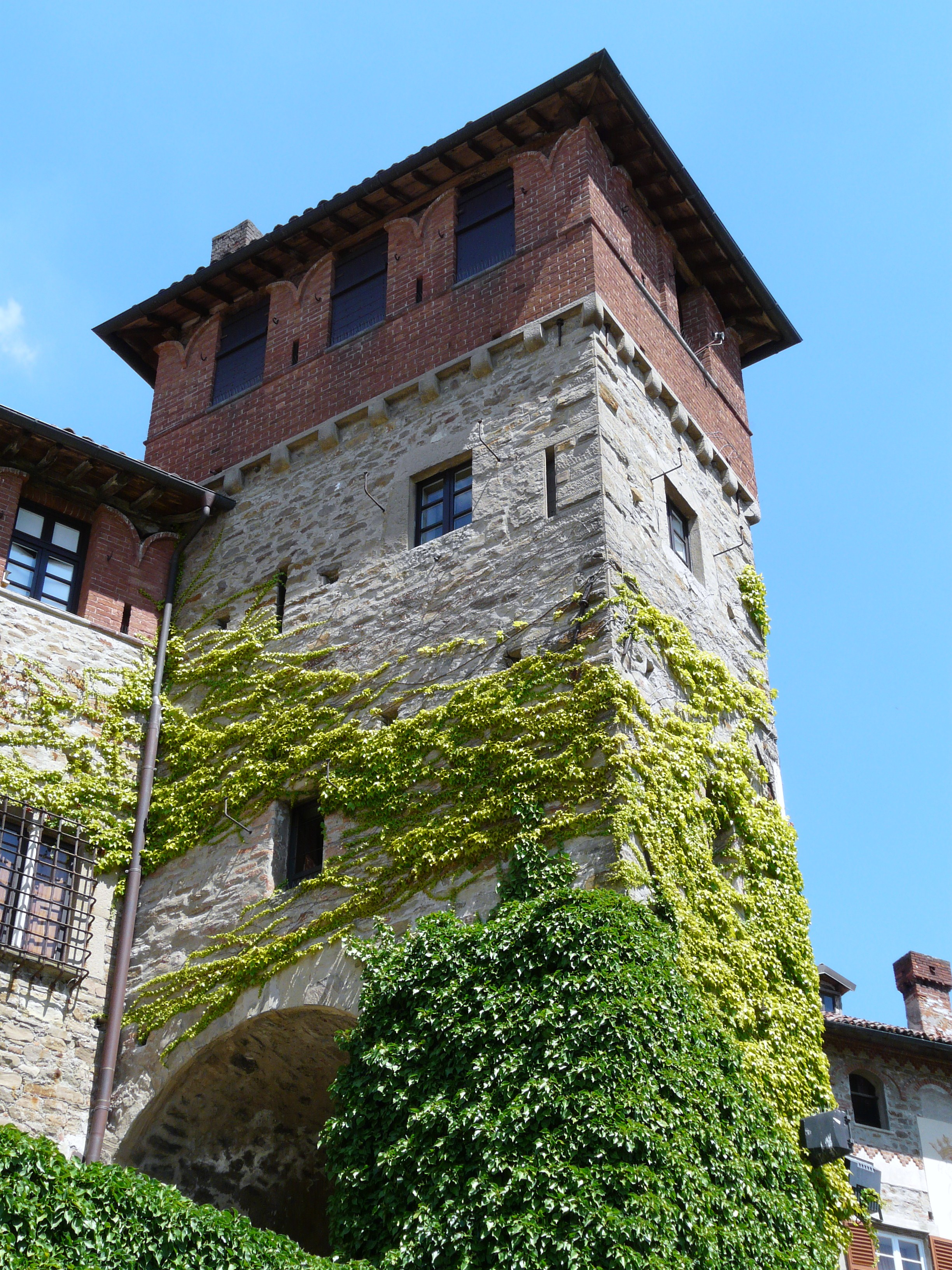

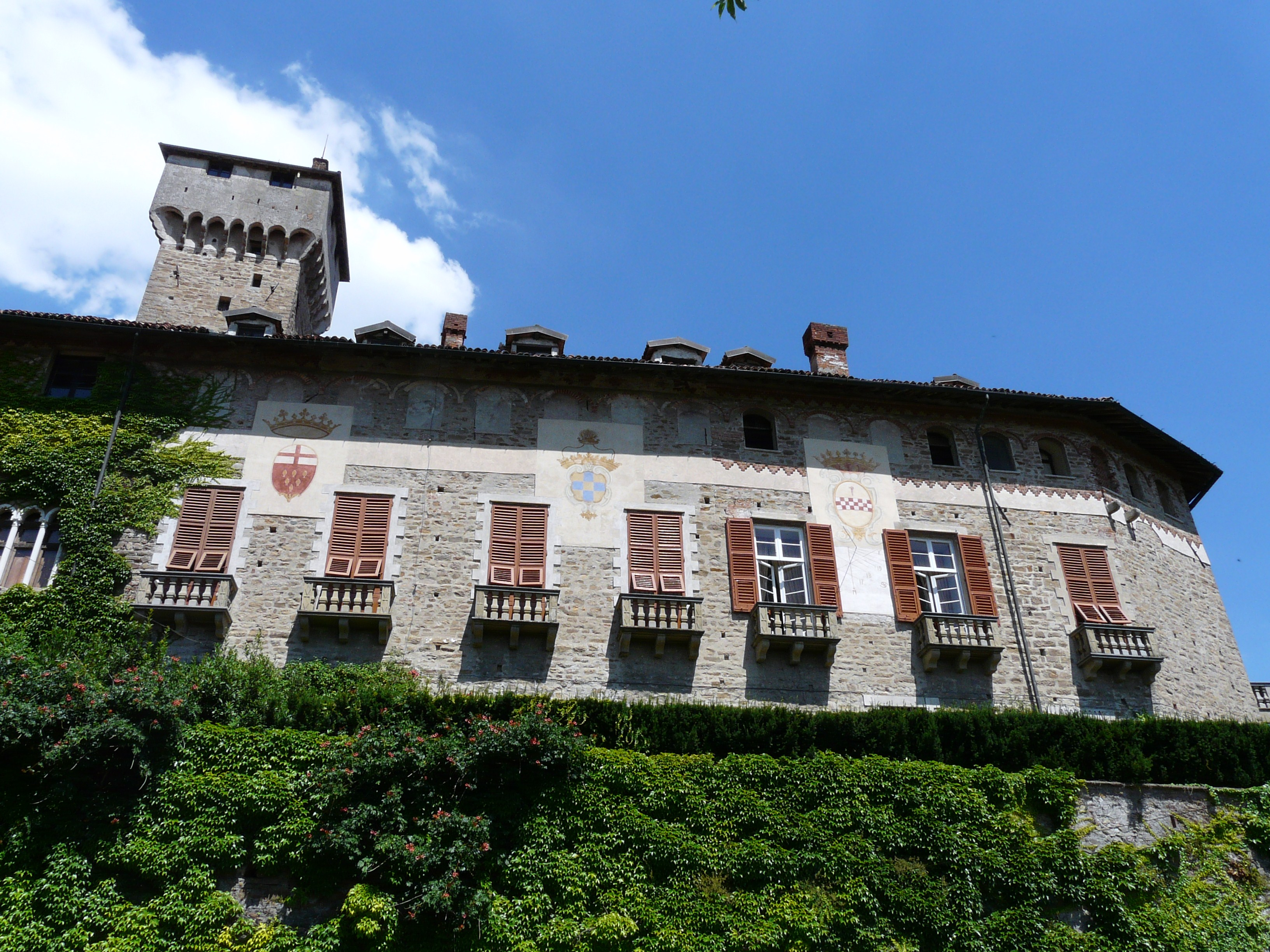
