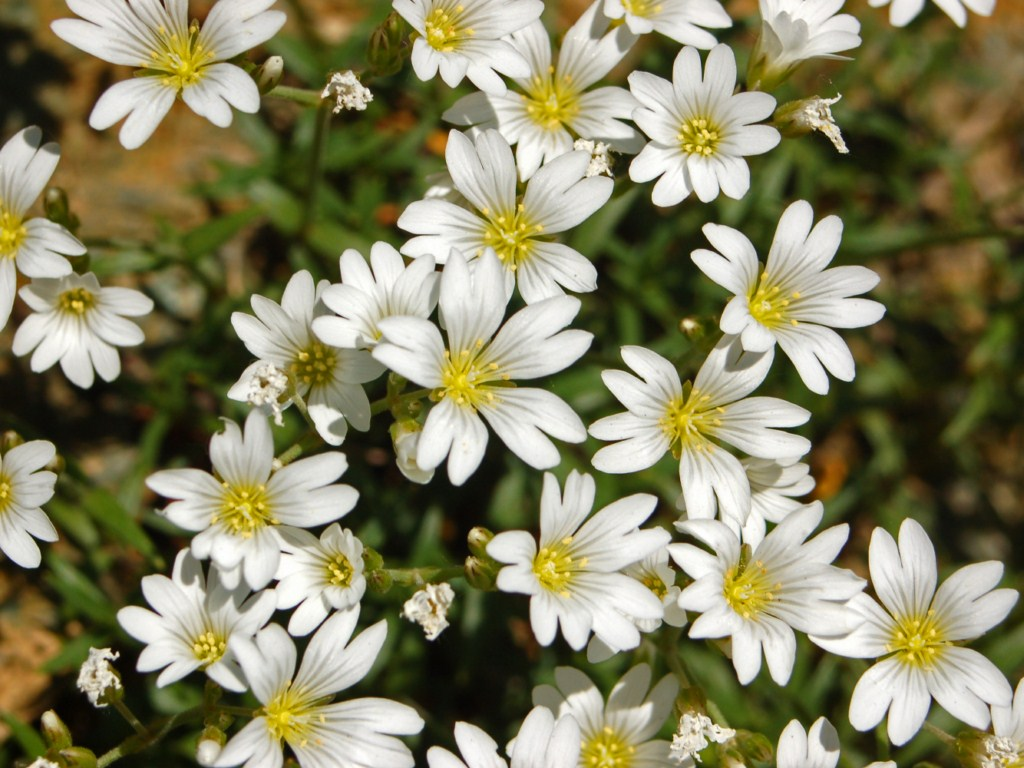

Scientific classification
- Kingdom: Plantae
- Clade: Tracheophytes
- Clade: Angiosperms
- Clade: Eudicots
- Order: Caryophyllales
- Family: Caryophyllaceae
- Genus: Cerastium
- Species: C. utriense

Binomial name
- Cerastium utriense Barberis

= Cerastium utriense =

Species of flowering plant in the pink family

Cerastium utriense is a species of perennial flowering plant in the genus Cerastium, belonging to the family Caryophyllaceae. It was first described in 1988. It is endemic to Italy.

== Description ==
Cerastium utriense is a mat-forming or clumpy hemicryptophyte, reaching 15–20 centimetres (5.9–7.9 in) in height, with a maximum of about 25 centimetres (9.8 in). It is usually somewhat hairy in texture, with glabrous, linear to lance-shaped leaves a few centimeters long. The pubescent inflorescence is usually a dense cluster of many flowers. The flower has five white, glabrous petals, each with two lobes, and five hairy sepals at the base. The flowering period is May through July. The fruit is a sub-cylindrical capsule up to 1.5 centimeters long containing several brown seeds. This species is quite similar to Cerastium arvense, but it may be distinguished by the erect peduncles bearing the ripe fruits.

== Distribution ==
This is an Italian endemic plant with a restricted distribution. It is limited to northwestern Italy, where it can be found in the Apennines of Liguria and Piedmont.

== Habitat ==
This is a serpentine endemic, growing in ultramafic outcrops and mountain scrublands. It occurs at an altitude of 400–1,200 metres (1,300–3,900 ft) above sea level.
