= Laghi del Gorzente =

Group of lakes in Italy

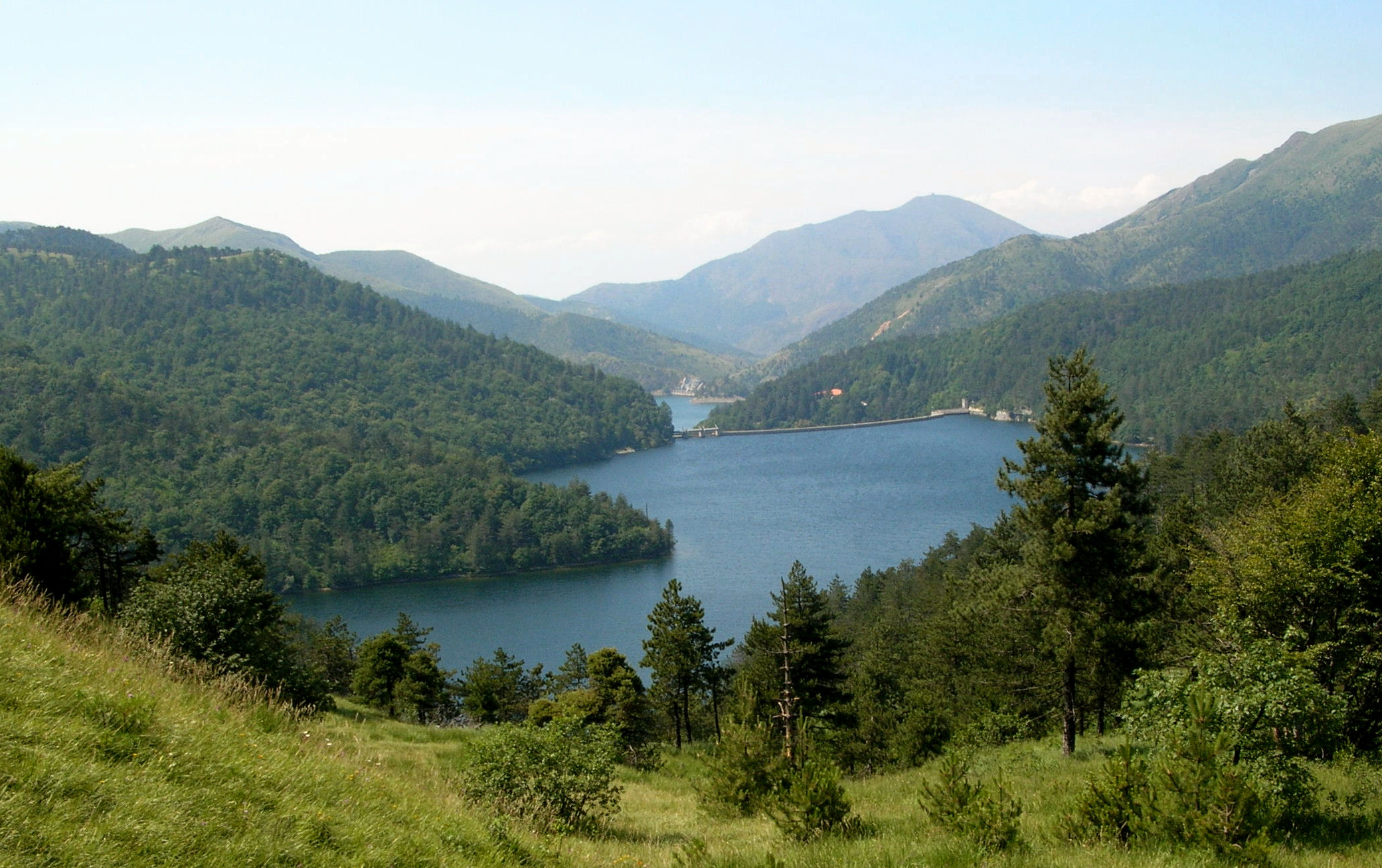

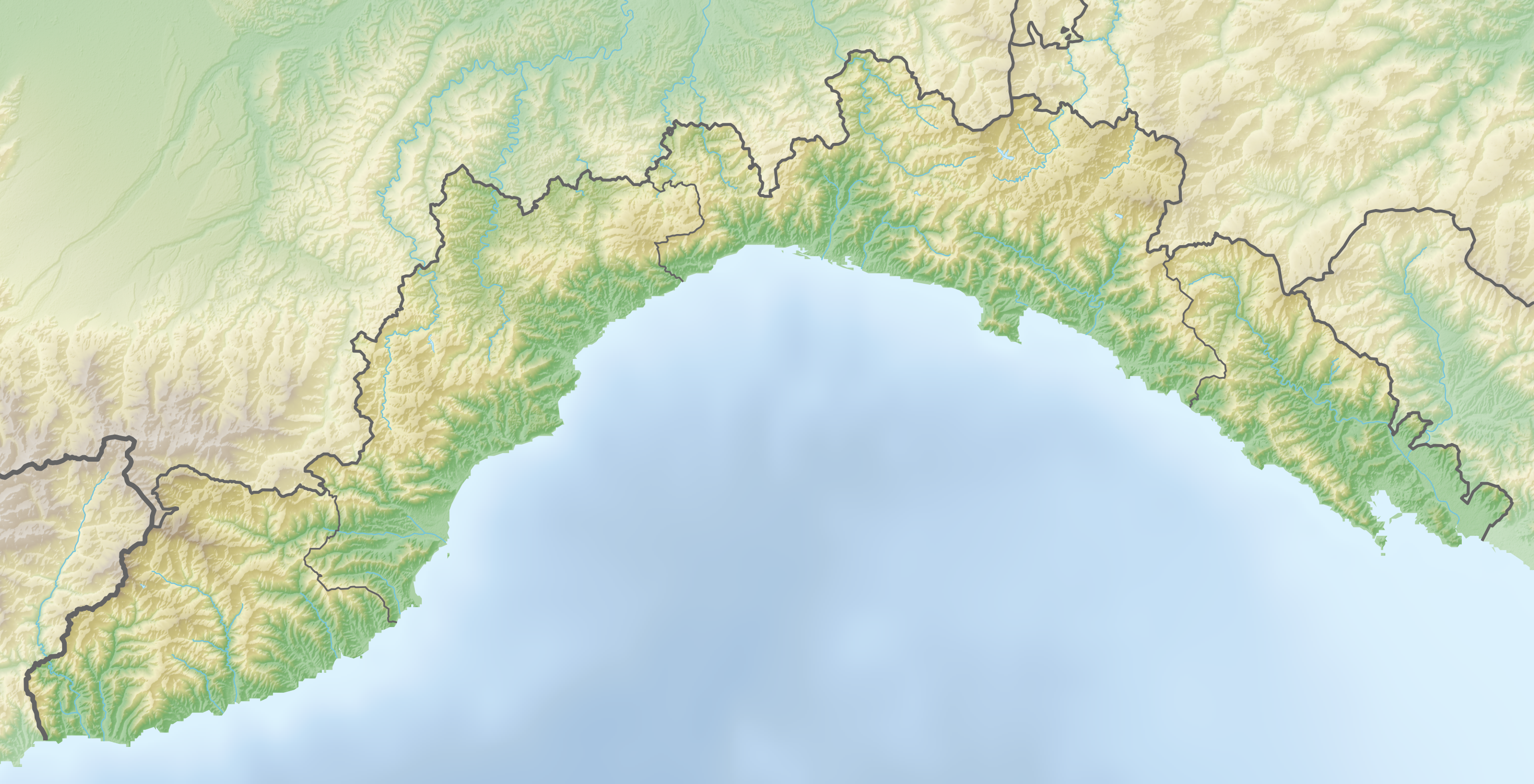
- Location within Liguria
- Location: Province of Genoa (Liguria); Province of Alessandria (Piedmont)
- Coordinates: 44°33′2″N 8°49′18″E
- Primary inflows: Gorzente
- Primary outflows: Rio Lischeo
- Basin countries: Italy

Laghi del Gorzente is a group of three lakes in north-west Italy which straddles the provinces of Genoa (in Liguria) and Alessandria (in Piedmont).

== Geography ==
The lowest lake is named Lago Bruno (647 m), while Lago Lungo is at 684 m and Lago Badana at 717 m.

== Nature conservation ==
The lakes are included in the Piedmontese natural park of the Capanne di Marcarolo.
