= Tagliolo Monferrato =

- Comune
- Comune di Tagliolo Monferrato
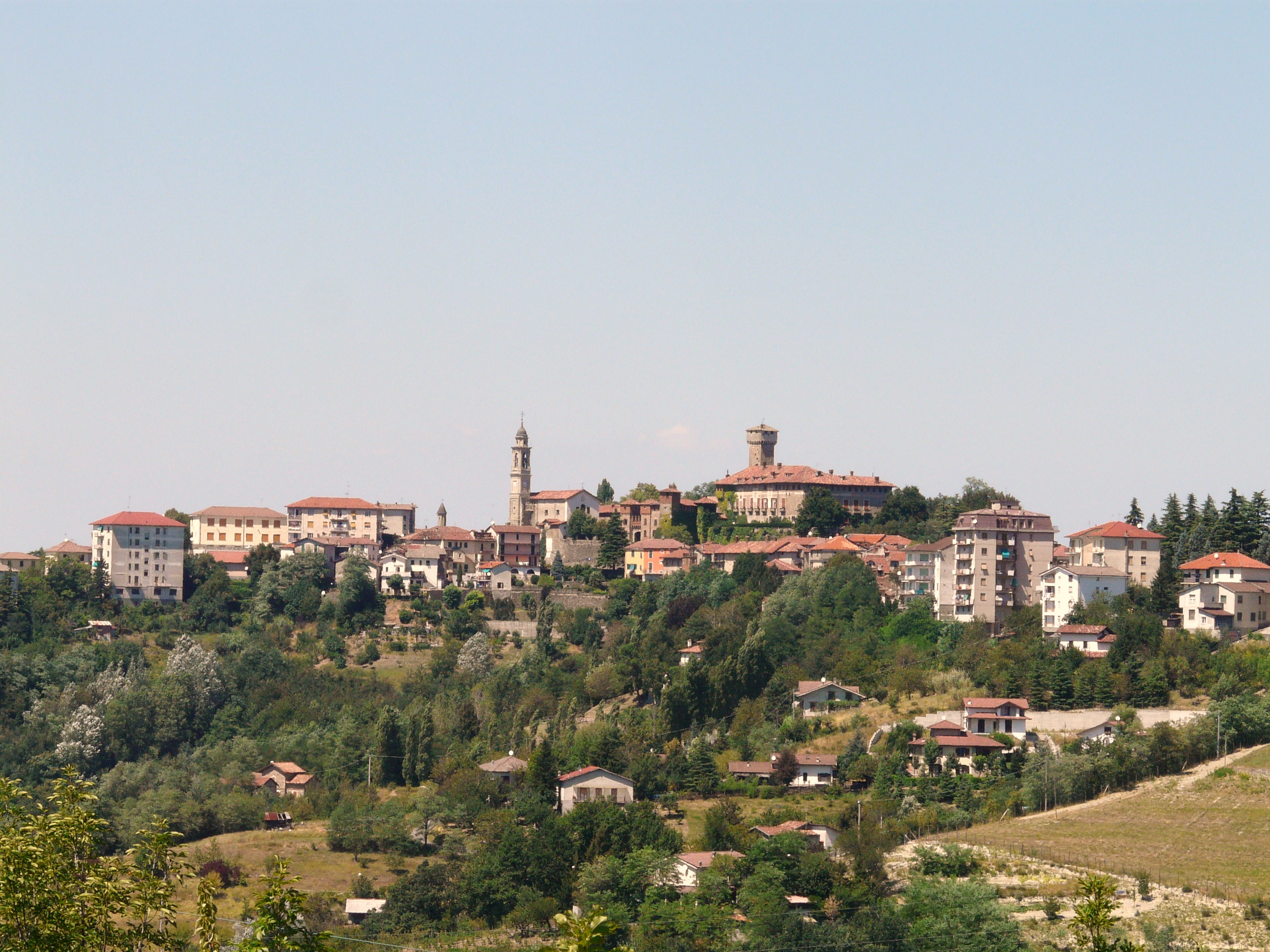

- Location within Italy Location within Piedmont
- Coordinates: 44°38′N 8°40′E
- Country: Italy
- Region: Piedmont
- Province: Province of Alessandria (AL)
- Frazioni: Cherli, Grossi, Varo, Pessino, Caraffa, Mongiardino, Gambina

Area
  - Total: 25.9 km^{2} (10.0 sq mi)
- Elevation: 315 m (1,033 ft)

Population (Dec. 2004)
  - Total: 1,499
  - Density: 57.9/km^{2} (150/sq mi)
- Demonym: Tagliolesi
- Time zone: UTC+1 (CET)
  - Summer (DST): UTC+2 (CEST)
- Postal code: 15070
- Dialing code: 0143

Tagliolo Monferrato is a comune (municipality) in the Province of Alessandria in the Italian region Piedmont, located about 90 kilometres (56 mi) southeast of Turin and about 30 kilometres (19 mi) south of Alessandria. As of 31 December 2004, it had a population of 1,499 and an area of 25.9 square kilometres (10.0 mi^{2}).

The municipality of Tagliolo Monferrato contains the frazioni (subdivisions, mainly villages and hamlets) Cherli, Grossi, Varo, Pessino, Caraffa, Gambina and Mongiardino.

Tagliolo Monferrato borders the following municipalities: Belforte Monferrato, Bosio, Casaleggio Boiro, Lerma, Ovada, Rossiglione, and Silvano d'Orba.

== Demographic evolution ==
Historical population

Year	Pop.	±%
1861	2,295	—
1871	2,252	−1.9%
1881	2,282	+1.3%
1901	2,567	+12.5%
1911	2,348	−8.5%

Year	Pop.	±%
1921	2,290	−2.5%
1931	2,072	−9.5%
1936	1,991	−3.9%
1951	1,736	−12.8%
1961	1,340	−22.8%

Year	Pop.	±%
1971	1,147	−14.4%
1981	1,260	+9.9%
1991	1,392	+10.5%
2001	1,457	+4.7%

Source: Data from ISTAT

== See also ==
- Parco naturale delle Capanne di Marcarolo
- Tagliolo Monferrato Castle
