= Mornese =

Mornese Morneize
- Comune
- Comune di Mornese
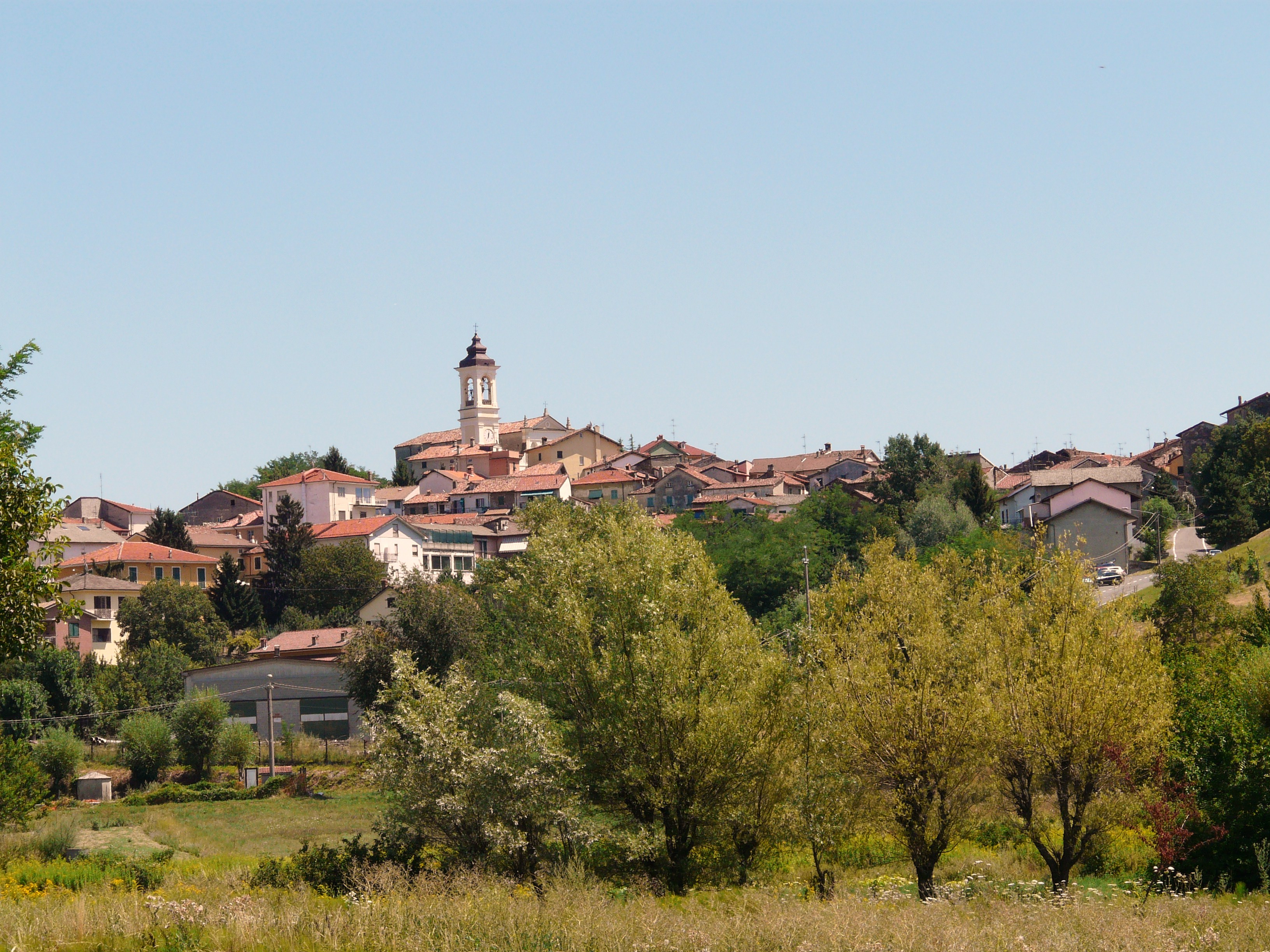

- Coat of arms

- Location within Italy Location within Piedmont
- Coordinates: 44°38′N 8°45′E
- Country: Italy
- Region: Piedmont
- Province: Alessandria (AL)
- Frazioni: Mazzarelli

Government
  - Mayor: Simone Pestarino

Area
  - Total: 13.3 km^{2} (5.1 sq mi)
- Elevation: 380 m (1,250 ft)

Population (31 December 2008)
  - Total: 726
  - Density: 54.6/km^{2} (141/sq mi)
- Demonym: Mornesini
- Time zone: UTC+1 (CET)
  - Summer (DST): UTC+2 (CEST)
- Postal code: 15075
- Dialing code: 0143

Mornese (Ligurian: Morneize) is a comune (municipality) in the Province of Alessandria in the Italian region Piedmont, located about 100 kilometres (62 mi) southeast of Turin and about 35 kilometres (22 mi) southeast of Alessandria.

Mornese borders the following municipalities: Bosio, Casaleggio Boiro, Montaldeo, and Parodi Ligure.

== See also ==
- Parco naturale delle Capanne di Marcarolo
