= Lerma, Piedmont =

Lerma
- Comune
- Comune di Lerma
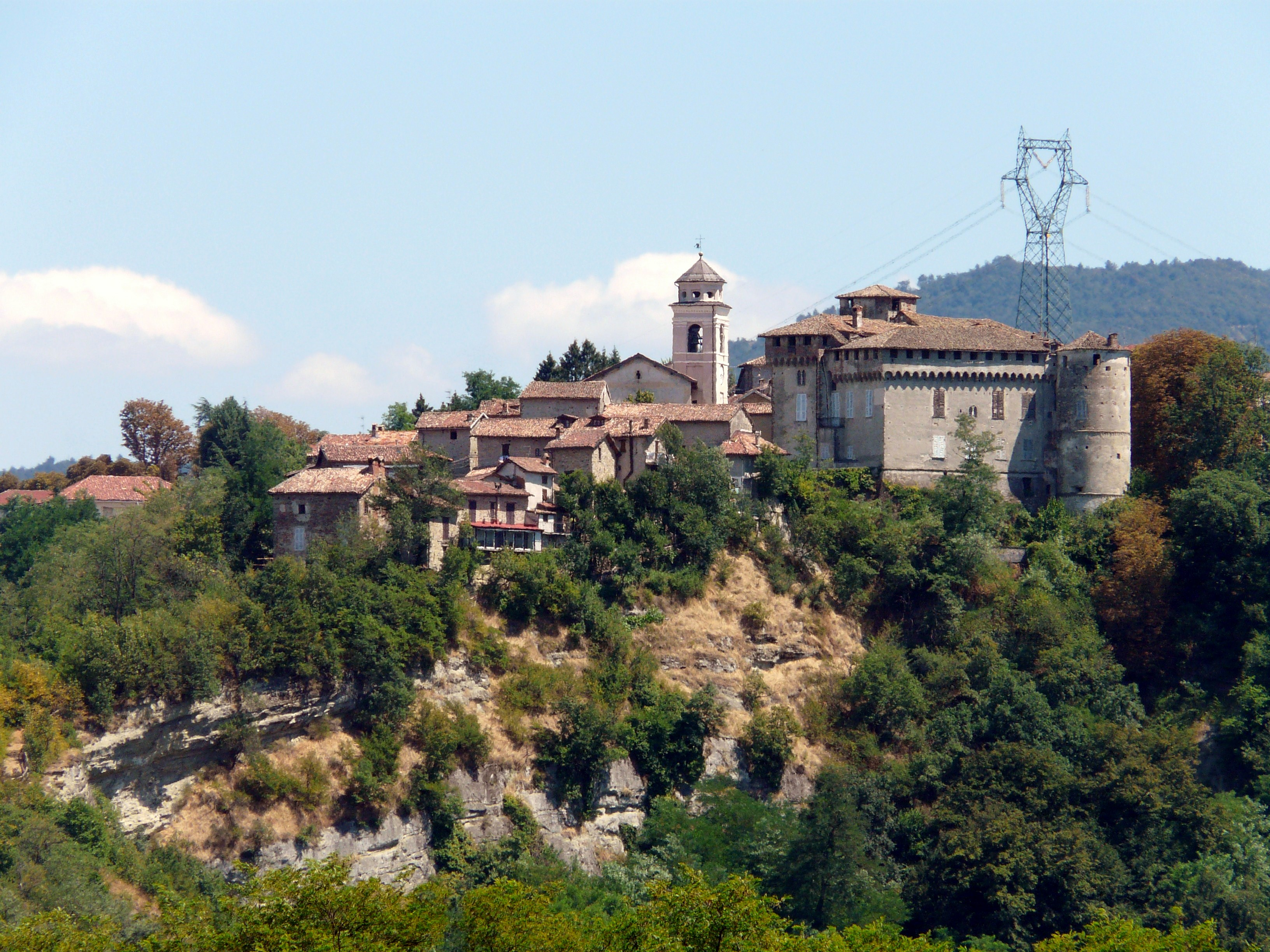

- Coat of arms

- Location within Italy Location within Piedmont
- Coordinates: 44°38′N 8°42′E
- Country: Italy
- Region: Piedmont
- Province: Alessandria (AL)
- Frazioni: Mascatagliata, Cà D'Abramo

Government
  - Mayor: Bruno Alosio

Area
  - Total: 14.5 km^{2} (5.6 sq mi)
- Elevation: 293 m (961 ft)

Population (31/06/2017)
  - Total: 849
  - Density: 58.6/km^{2} (152/sq mi)
- Demonym: Lermèsi
- Time zone: UTC+1 (CET)
  - Summer (DST): UTC+2 (CEST)
- Postal code: 15070
- Dialing code: 0143

Lerma is a comune (municipality) of approx. 849 inhabitants, in the Province of Alessandria in the Italian region of Piedmont, about 90 kilometres (56 mi) southeast of Turin and about 30 kilometres (19 mi) south of Alessandria.

It borders the municipalities of Bosio, Casaleggio Boiro, Castelletto d'Orba, Montaldeo, Silvano d'Orba and Tagliolo Monferrato.

== History ==
The history of Lerma begins in 1166, when William V of Monferrato tried to reconquer the castle of Parodi. During the attempt, however, Rondinaria was destroyed, and the survivors migrated to a steep hill overlooking the Piota valley, starting to reinforce it. It was precisely in that period that Erma was born (as a hermit, due to the remoteness of the village), today's Lerma. The first document in which its existence is found occurs under the marquises of Morbello. The slow Ligurian penetration occurred when part of the territory passed into the hands of the Genoese Republic in 1204, and then passed completely to Genoa in 1233. In 1325 Lerma became a possession of the marquises of Monferrato, and subsequently in 1384 the castle and its surroundings were sold to the Genoese, being passed from family to family and then sold to Ottobono Spinola in 1414, and from this moment it will remain of the aforementioned house. An event of great importance occurred during the Thirty Years' War, when 28 brave men aided by their respective women offered strong resistance with the few means available (boiling water, arrows and stones) to the 1500 Spanish soldiers of Don Diego D'Aragona in punitive expedition against the Spinolas. Given the enormous difference in forces, the Lermese were forced to surrender. The Spaniards, however, left a garrison so that, it was written: "he will not fail to teach modesty to the girls and women of the town and from time to time caress the shoulders of some husband and some father". In 1713, following the Treaty of Utrecht, it definitively passed under the Savoys, who immediately imposed heavy taxes on the population. A legend known to most of the people of Lerme is certainly that of the three roses: Isabella Corvalan, in 1565, who was staying in the castle, received three golden roses from a Genoese chivalric order, whose petals were studded with rubies. The roses hide a secret message that according to tradition only the Queen of Castile and some esoteric orders knew how to interpret. Called back to Milan by the Spanish Viceroy, Donna Isabella hid the roses in the castle, promising to return later to collect them, which however she did not do, thus causing the treasure to still remain inside the building hidden somewhere. In the 19th century, documents were found that brought this fact to light, but despite searches, the roses were never found. It is said that on a single autumn day, when the sun hits the castle with its rays obliquely, the glow of the rubies will make the roses shine.
