= Casaleggio Boiro =

- Comune
- Comune di Casaleggio Boiro
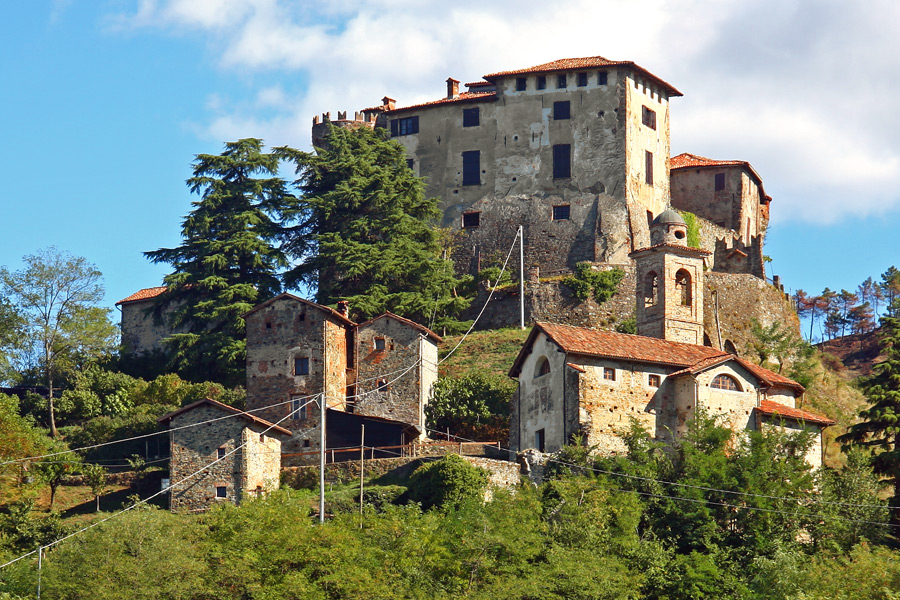

- Coat of arms

- Location within Italy Location within Piedmont
- Coordinates: 44°37′N 8°43′E
- Country: Italy
- Region: Piedmont
- Province: Province of Alessandria (AL)

Area
  - Total: 12.2 km^{2} (4.7 sq mi)
- Elevation: 321 m (1,053 ft)

Population (Dec. 2004)
  - Total: 379
  - Density: 31.1/km^{2} (80.5/sq mi)
- Demonym: Casaleggesi
- Time zone: UTC+1 (CET)
  - Summer (DST): UTC+2 (CEST)
- Postal code: 15070
- Dialing code: 0143

Casaleggio Boiro is a comune (municipality) in the Province of Alessandria in the Italian region Piedmont, located about 90 kilometres (56 mi) southeast of Turin and about 35 kilometres (22 mi) south of Alessandria. As of 31 December 2004, it had a population of 379 and an area of 12.2 square kilometres (4.7 mi^{2}).

Casaleggio Boiro borders the following municipalities: Bosio, Lerma, Montaldeo, Mornese, and Tagliolo Monferrato.

== Demographic evolution ==
Historical population

Year	Pop.	±%
1861	550	—
1871	623	+13.3%
1881	639	+2.6%
1901	621	−2.8%
1911	675	+8.7%

Year	Pop.	±%
1921	615	−8.9%
1931	546	−11.2%
1936	508	−7.0%
1951	417	−17.9%
1961	312	−25.2%

Year	Pop.	±%
1971	269	−13.8%
1981	267	−0.7%
1991	339	+27.0%
2001	377	+11.2%

Source: Data from ISTAT

== See also ==
- Parco naturale delle Capanne di Marcarolo
