= Bosio =

- Comune
- Comune di Bosio
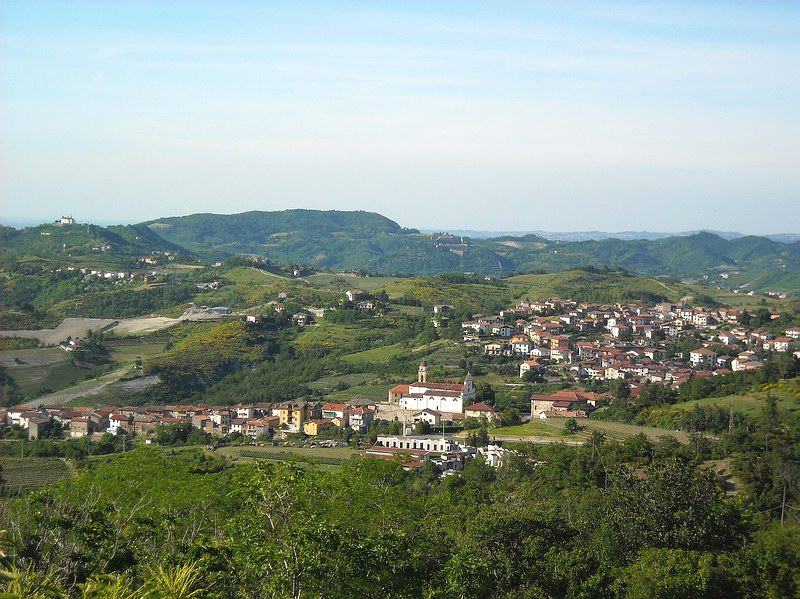

- Coat of arms

- Location within Italy Location within Piedmont
- Coordinates: 44°38′N 8°47′E
- Country: Italy
- Region: Piedmont
- Province: Alessandria (AL)
- Frazioni: Capanne di Marcarolo, Costa San Stefano, Maietto, Mogreto, Serra, Spessa, Val Pagani

Government
  - Mayor: Domenico Merlo

Area
  - Total: 66.9 km^{2} (25.8 sq mi)
- Elevation: 358 m (1,175 ft)

Population (31 December 2017)
  - Total: 1,196
  - Density: 17.9/km^{2} (46.3/sq mi)
- Demonym: Bosiesi
- Time zone: UTC+1 (CET)
  - Summer (DST): UTC+2 (CEST)
- Postal code: 15060
- Dialing code: 0143

Bosio is a comune (municipality) in the Province of Alessandria in the Italian region Piedmont, located about 100 kilometres (62 mi) southeast of Turin and about 35 kilometres (22 mi) southeast of Alessandria.

Bosio borders the following municipalities: Campo Ligure, Campomorone, Casaleggio Boiro, Ceranesi, Gavi, Genoa, Lerma, Masone, Mele, Mornese, Parodi Ligure, Rossiglione, Tagliolo Monferrato, and Voltaggio.

== Geography ==
The nearest point to the Ligurian Sea in Piedmont lies in the communal territory of Bosio, on Monte Biscia Mora, where the sea is just 8 km away; however, there is not a road directly connecting these locations.

== See also ==
- Parco naturale delle Capanne di Marcarolo
