= Lemme =

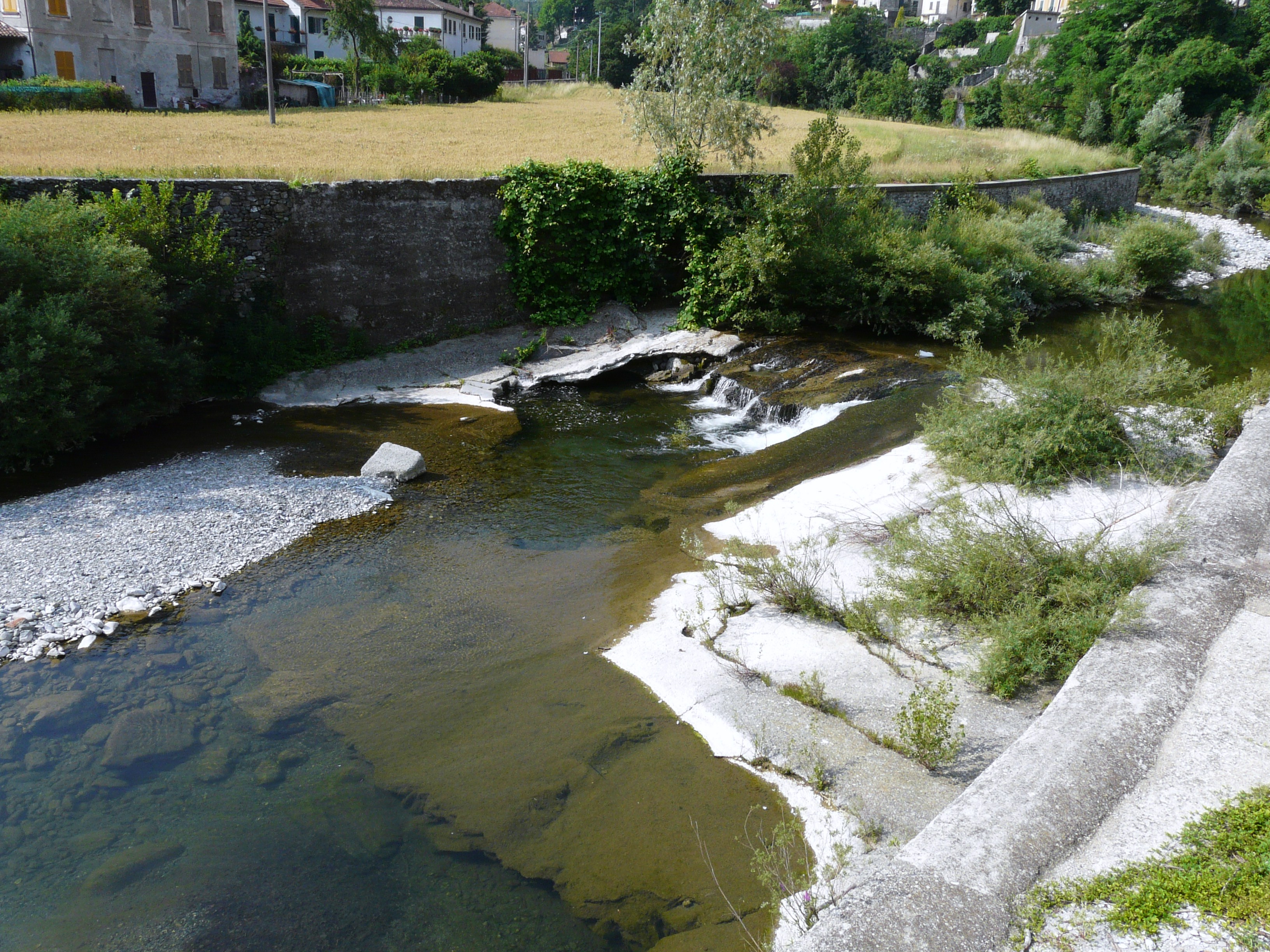
- The stream near Voltaggio

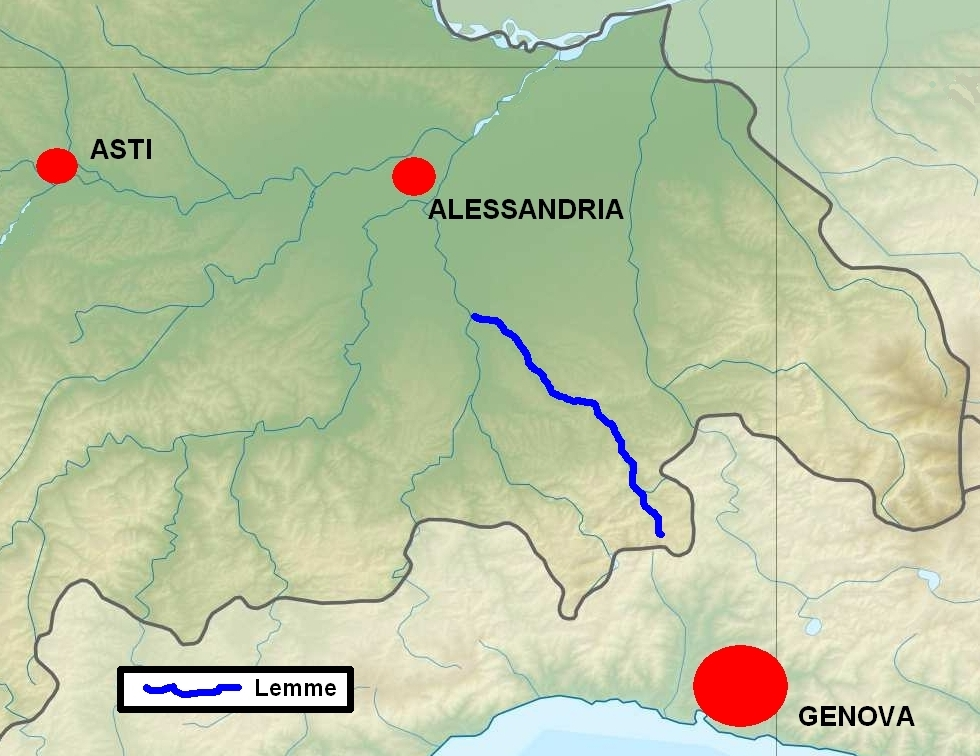
- Location within the SE Piedmont

Location
- Country: Italy (Piedmont, Province of Alessandria)

Physical characteristics
- Source
  - location: Monte Calvo
  - elevation: 750 m (2,460 ft)
- Mouth
  - location: The Orba at Predosa
  - coordinates: 44.7648°N 8.6729°E
- Length: 34.3 km (21.3 mi)
- Basin size: 180.5 km^{2} (69.7 sq mi)
- Discharge
  - average: (mouth) 3.1 m^{3}/s (110 cu ft/s)

Basin features
- Progression: Orba→ Bormida→ Tanaro→ Po→ Adriatic Sea

The Lemme is a 35 km torrent, a right tributary of the Orba, which flows through the Province of Alessandria in northern Italy.

== Geography ==
Its source is near Monte Calvo; from there it passes through the communes of Fraconalto, Voltaggio, Carrosio, Gavi, San Cristoforo, Francavilla Bisio, Basaluzzo and finally Predosa where it enters the Orba.

== Main tributaries ==
=== left hand tributaries ===
- rio delle Acque Striate;
- rio Morsone: it starts near Monte Tobbio and meets the Lemme in Voltaggio;
- rio Ardana: its upper valley includes Bosio, from which flows northwards meeting the Lemme in Gavi;
- rio Riolo: from San Cristoforo it runs not faraway from the Lemme meeting it near its confluence with the Orba.

=== right hand tributaries ===
- rio Carbonasca: from Fraconalto goes till Voltaggio where it meets the Lemme;
- torrente Neirone:
- torrente Riasco: it collects the waters flowing in the area of Pasturana and Tassarolo and meets the Lemme near Francavilla Bisio.

== Floods ==
The Lemme is characterised by an extremely variable discharge; very little water flows during the summer months, but it can also give rise to significant floods, such as those of 1978.

== History ==
The Département du Lemo or Dipartimento del Lemo of Ligurian Republic took its name at the end of the 18th century from the stream.
