= House of Spinola =

Genoese noble family

Spinola
- Noble House
- Arms of the House of Spinola
- Parent family: Visconti (Viscounts of Manesseno)
- Country: Republic of Genoa; Papal States; Kingdom of Italy; Italy
- Etymology: Viscount Guido, known as "Spinula"
- Founded: 12th century
- Founder: Guido Spinola
- Titles: Doge of Genoa (non-hereditary); Marquis of Farigliano, Garessio, Lerma, Molare, Morbello, Mornese, Spigno, Villalvernia; Count of Tassarolo; Lord of Belforte, Bistagno, Brignano, Cantalupo, Carrosio, Casaleggio Boiro, Casalnoceto, Cassano Spinola, Cassinelle, Castel de' Rati, Denice, Francavilla, Frascata, Frugarolo, Gorrino, Lu, Monastero Bormida, Moncalvo, Montacuto, Montemarzino, Paderno, Pasturana, Pontecurone, Prasco, Tagliolo, Torcello, Torre de' Rati, Torre Uzzone, Torrione, Valle Scrivia, Vignale, Voltaggio
- Motto: Fecerunt Me Et Plasmaverunt Me ('They made me and shaped me.')

The House of Spinola, or Spinola family, was a prominent Genoese noble family that played a leading role in the Republic of Genoa. Their influence reached its height during the thirteenth and fourteenth centuries.

== Notable members ==
Guido Spinola was one of the first important members of the family. He served as Consul of Genoa in 1102. The family, which founded its wealth on trading, finance, and the acquisition of land, originates from Guido and Oberto, grandsons of Belo Bozumi.

The next Spinola to come to prominence after Guido was Oberto. In May 1262, he joined forces with Oberto Doria to drive the foreign capitano del popolo of Genoa, Guglielmo Boccanegra, from power and reform the government. They replaced him with two captains of the people, elected for 22 years, under Oberto Spinola and Oberto Doria. How long Oberto Spinola remained as captain of the people is not clear. However, his son Corrado Spinola was a leading admiral in the Genoese war with Pisa.

In 1266, Oberto led the Genoese fleets in a victory against the Venetians. Then, in 1270, they exiled the Fieschi and Grimaldi families.

In about 1289, Corrado Spinola became the captain of the people in place of his father, Oberto. In 1301, Corrado Spinola resigned the office of captain of the people, as did Lamba Doria.

The next phase of Spinola involvement came through Opicino Spinola.

Galeotto Spinola was appointed captain of the people in 1335, along with Raffaele Doria. They overthrew the power of Robert of Naples in Genoa.

In 1435, Francesco Spinola was successful at the Siege of Gaeta during the war over the control of Naples. Shortly afterwards, Francesco led a revolt that ended the rule of a Visconti-based government from Milan over Genoa.

The great Italian-Spanish general, Ambrogio Spinola, who served as Captain-General of the Army of Flanders from 1603 to 1629, was also a member of this family.

=== Doges of the Republic of Genoa and Kings of Corsica ===
- Battista Spinola, 47th Doge.
- Luca Spinola, 57th Doge.
- Simone Spinola, 66th Doge.
- Tomaso Spinola, 90th Doge.
- Andrea Spinola, 99th Doge.
- Alessandro Spinola, 112th Doge.
- Agostino Spinola, 125th Doge.
- Luca Spinola, 129th Doge.
- Domenico Maria Spinola, 151st Doge.
- Nicolò Spinola, 155th Doge.
- Ferdinando Spinola, 172nd Doge.

== Sources ==
- Malleson, George Bruce. Studies in Genoese History. p. 294ff
