= Gavi, Piedmont =

Gavi
- Comune
- Comune di Gavi
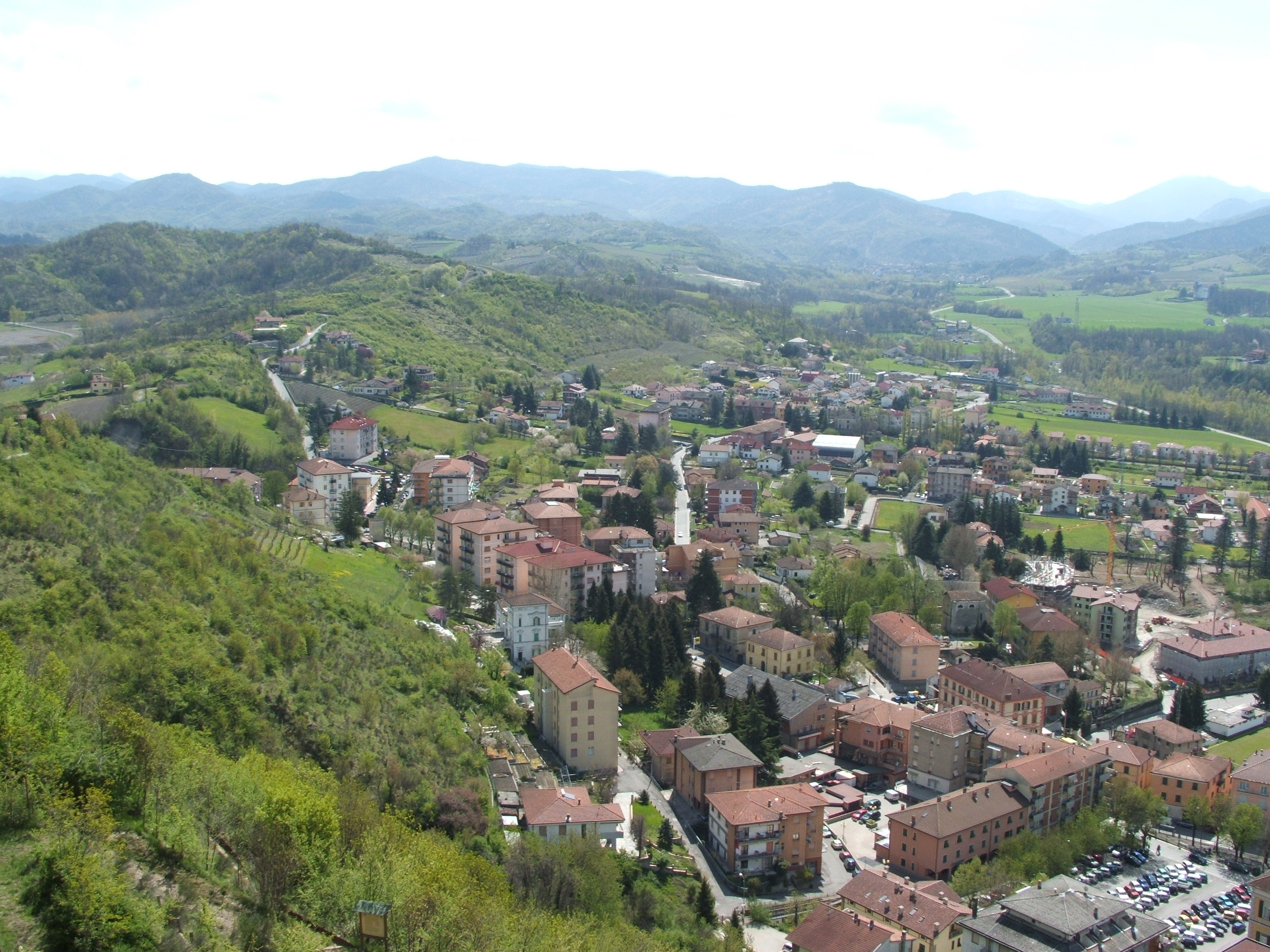

- Coat of arms

- Location within Italy Location within Piedmont
- Coordinates: 44°41′N 8°48′E
- Country: Italy
- Region: Piedmont
- Province: Alessandria (AL)
- Frazioni: Rovereto, Monterotondo, Alice, Pratolungo.

Government
  - Mayor: Nicoletta Rachele Albano

Area
  - Total: 50.9 km^{2} (19.7 sq mi)
- Elevation: 233 m (764 ft)

Population (31 December 2008)
  - Total: 4,622
  - Density: 90.8/km^{2} (235/sq mi)
- Demonym: Gaviesi
- Time zone: UTC+1 (CET)
  - Summer (DST): UTC+2 (CEST)
- Postal code: 15066
- Dialing code: 0143
- Patron saint: St. James
- Saint day: July 25
- Website: Official website

Gavi is a comune (municipality) in the Province of Alessandria in the Italian region Piedmont, located about 100 kilometres (62 mi) southeast of Turin and about 30 kilometres (19 mi) southeast of Alessandria.

Gavi borders the following municipalities: Arquata Scrivia, Bosio, Carrosio, Francavilla Bisio, Isola del Cantone, Novi Ligure, Parodi Ligure, San Cristoforo, Serravalle Scrivia, Tassarolo, and Voltaggio.

== History ==
The area of Gavi was already settled in Neolithic times; later it perhaps housed a Roman military outpost defending the Via Postumia. After the fall of the Western Roman Empire it was captured by the Magyars and later by the Saracens. According to the legend, the current name would derive from that of a princess of the latter, Gavia or Gavina, who had established herself in a castle here.

Later in the Middle Ages the town was under the Marquisses of Gavi, allied with Frederick Barbarossa, who took refuge here after the Battle of Legnano. In 1202 Gavi was sold to the Republic of Genoa. After a parenthesis under the Visconti and France, it returned to Genoa in 1528.

In 1625, during the First Genoese–Savoyard War, it was attacked and stormed by French-Savoy troops, but the Genoese retook it after only 21 days. It was decided to turn Gavi into a powerful fortress. After a French domination from 1804, in 1815 it was assigned to the Kingdom of Sardinia.

The fortress was later turned into a penitentiary; during World War II it was used as a POW camp (P.G. 5, a "bad boys" prison for those who attempted escape from other camps).

== Main sights ==
- The fortress, rebuilt in the 17th century around the pre-existing castle.
- Church of San Giacomo Maggiore, in Romanesque style
- Municipal Palace. Remains of its medieval line of wall can be seen today.
- Franciscan convent of Nostra Signora dele Grazie della Valle, outside the town (18th century). It houses a statue of St. Bernardino and a painting of the Virgin from the 15th century.

== Wine ==
Gavi is in the DOCG region of Cortese di Gavi; Cortese di Gavi produced within the comune of Gavi may be labeled "Gavi di Gavi".
