= Carpeneto =

- Comune
- Comune di Carpeneto
- Location within Italy Location within Piedmont
- Coordinates: 44°41′N 8°36′E
- Country: Italy
- Region: Piedmont
- Province: Alessandria (AL)
- Frazioni: Cascina Vecchia, Madonna della Villa

Government
  - Mayor: Carlo Massimiliano Olivieri

Area
  - Total: 13.6 km^{2} (5.3 sq mi)
- Elevation: 329 m (1,079 ft)

Population (31 December 2010)
  - Total: 966
  - Density: 71.0/km^{2} (184/sq mi)
- Demonym: Carpenetesi
- Time zone: UTC+1 (CET)
  - Summer (DST): UTC+2 (CEST)
- Postal code: 15071
- Dialing code: 0143
- Website: Official website

Carpeneto is a comune (municipality) in the Province of Alessandria in the Italian region of Piedmont. It is located about 80 kilometres (50 mi) southeast of Turin, and about 25 kilometres (16 mi) south of Alessandria.

Carpeneto borders the following municipalities: Montaldo Bormida, Predosa, Rocca Grimalda, Sezzadio, and Trisobbio.

The Baroque church of San Giorgio serves as the main Roman Catholic parish for the comune.
