= Salvarezza =

Salvarezza is an Italian surname. Notable people with the surname include:

- Antonio Salvarezza (1902–1985), Italian tenor
- Cesare Salvarezza (1849–1915), Italian politician
- Elvidio Salvarezza (1850–1923), Italian politician
- Giuseppe Salvarezza (1924–1944), Italian resistance fighter
- Roberto Salvarezza (born 1952), Argentine biochemist, researcher, and politician
