= Domenico Bovone =

Italian anti-fascist

- Born: 13 December 1903; Bosco Marengo, Italy
- Died: 17 June 1932 (aged 28); Rome, Italy

Domenico Bovone (13 December 1903 – 17 June 1932) was an Italian anti-fascist involved in organizing bombing attacks against the Fascist regime and subsequently sentenced to death by the Special Tribunal for the Defense of the State in 1932.

== Biography ==
Born in Bosco Marengo, in the Province of Alessandria, Bovone was a businessman involved in the production and trade of cereals. Following a series of unsuccessful business ventures, he encountered financial difficulties and moved to France, where he came into contact with Italian anti-fascist exiles. In Paris, he also met the Austrian dancer Margherita Blaha, with whom he began a romantic relationship. The expenses associated with their relationship further worsened his financial situation.

During his stay in France, Bovone joined the Concentrazione antifascista (Anti-Fascist Concentration) in Paris and, according to the Associazione Nazionale Perseguitati Politici Italiani Antifascisti (ANPPIA), headed an organization associated with Giustizia e Libertà. Beginning in January 1931, he was involved in the clandestine distribution in Italy of La Libertà, the newspaper of the Concentrazione, before turning to the organization and execution of bombing attacks against the Fascist regime. He used a mill he owned in Rivarolo Ligure, his mother's house and the apartment he shared with his partner as operational bases. He was also assisted by Carlo Enza, a Ligurian office worker who was likewise involved in clandestine anti-fascist activities. Between 30 May and 31 July 1931, bombing attacks linked to Bovone took place in Turin, Genoa and Bologna. In Bologna, the explosions killed a non-commissioned officer of the Carabinieri and injured three civilians. During the same period, according to historical accounts, Bovone allegedly accepted an assignment to prepare an assassination attempt against Benito Mussolini in exchange for the promise of a substantial financial reward. To this end, he travelled to Rome to study Mussolini's habits and movements.

On 5 September 1931, while preparing explosive devices at his home in Genoa, an accidental explosion left Bovone seriously injured, resulting in the loss of his left forearm. His mother, Marcella Gatti, was killed in the explosion, while his sister Giovanna was injured. During the subsequent investigation, police discovered additional explosives both at his home and at the mill in Rivarolo Ligure, together with documents linking Bovone to anti-fascist exile circles in France. Bovone, who was hospitalized at the time, was arrested and subsequently brought before the Special Tribunal. The trial concluded on 15 June 1932 with Bovone being sentenced to death for allegedly plotting an assassination attempt against Mussolini. Margherita Blaha, who had also been implicated during the investigation, was accused of conspiracy to commit mass murder and attempted assassination of the head of government. She was sentenced to thirty years' imprisonment, as was Carlo Enza.

The death sentence was carried out at dawn on 17 June 1932 at Forte Bravetta in Rome. Bovone was shot in the back by a firing squad of the Voluntary Militia for National Security, just minutes before the execution of the anarchist Angelo Pellegrino Sbardellotto, who had also been sentenced to death for plotting an assassination attempt against Mussolini. The execution attracted international attention. The American magazine Time published an article entitled "Bullets in the Back", describing the execution of the two men in the presence of hundreds of Fascist militiamen. The article also reported that Bovone had signed a petition for clemency, whereas Sbardellotto had refused to do so.

== Bibliography ==
- De Felice, Renzo (1974). Mussolini il duce. Gli anni del consenso 1929-1936 (in Italian). Turin: Einaudi. ISBN 8806040774.
- Mellace, Giuseppina (2015). Delitti e stragi dell'Italia fascista dal 1922 al 1945 (in Italian). Rome: Newton Compton. ISBN 9788854179219.
- Pompeo, Augusto, ed. (2000). Forte Bravetta 1932-1945. Storie memorie territorio (PDF) (in Italian). Rome: ANPI provinciale di Roma e XVI Circoscrizione.
- "Foreign News: Bullets in the Back". Time. Vol. 19, no. 26. 27 June 1932. p. 19.
- Galzerano, Giuseppe (2018). "Sbardellotto, Angelo Pellegrino". Dizionario Biografico degli Italiani (in Italian). Vol. 91. Istituto dell'Enciclopedia Italiana.
