= Silvano d'Orba =

- Comune
- Comune di Silvano d'Orba
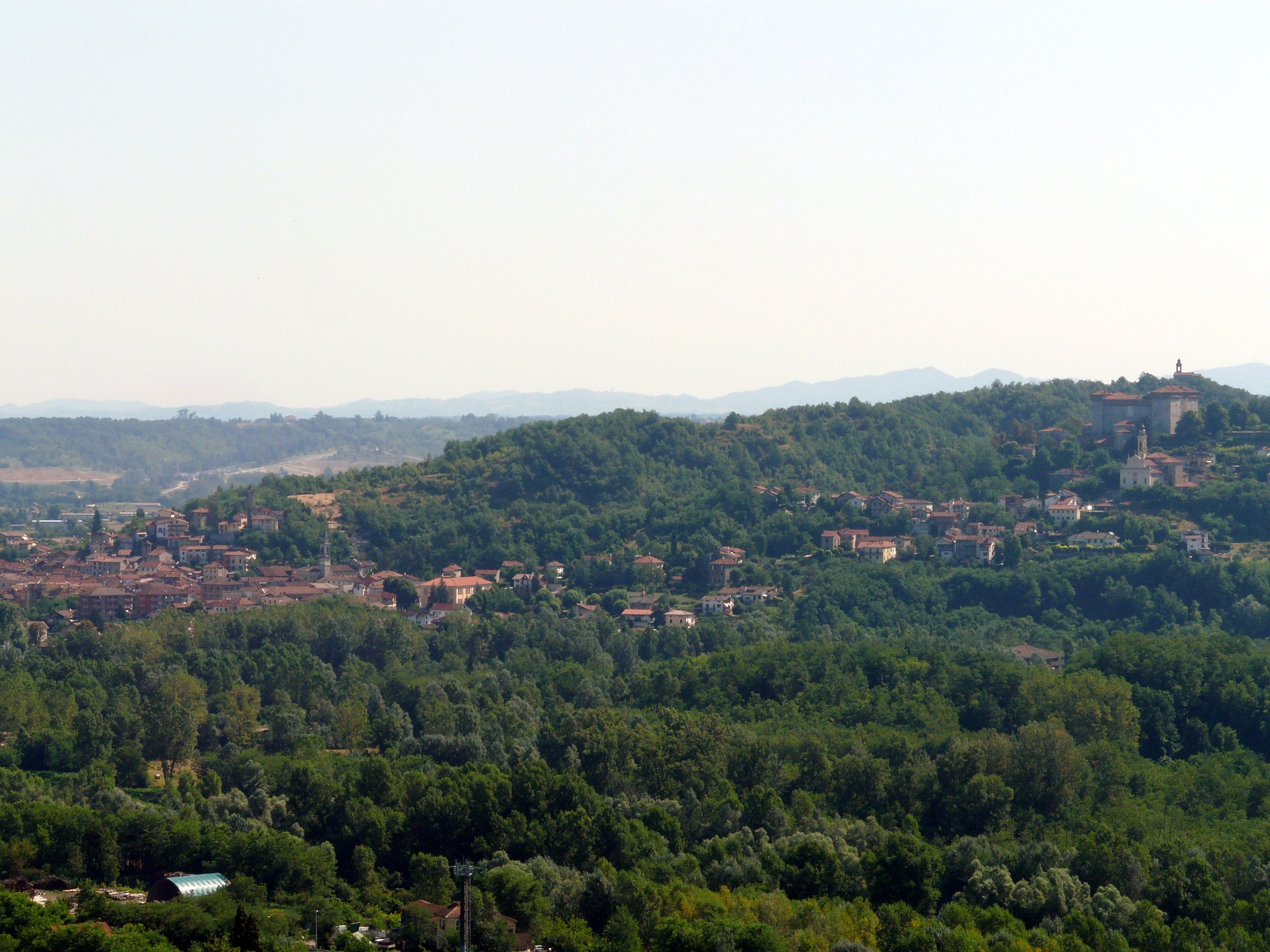

- Location within Italy Location within Piedmont
- Coordinates: 44°41′N 8°40′E
- Country: Italy
- Region: Piedmont
- Province: Province of Alessandria (AL)
- Frazioni: Valle Cochi, Pieve, Bacchetti, Guastarina, Pagliara, Villa, Milanesi, Setteventi, Ravino, Bolla, Pagliaccia, Bordini, Pianterasso, Bessica, Prieto, Castagnola, Caraffa, Passada

Area
  - Total: 12.1 km^{2} (4.7 sq mi)
- Elevation: 175 m (574 ft)

Population (Dec. 2004)
  - Total: 1,856
  - Density: 153/km^{2} (397/sq mi)
- Demonym: Silvanesi
- Time zone: UTC+1 (CET)
  - Summer (DST): UTC+2 (CEST)
- Postal code: 15060
- Dialing code: 0143

Silvano d'Orba is a comune (municipality) in the Province of Alessandria in the Italian region Piedmont, located about 90 kilometres (56 mi) southeast of Turin and about 25 kilometres (16 mi) south of Alessandria. As of 31 December 2004, it had a population of 1,856 and an area of 12.1 square kilometres (4.7 mi^{2}).

The municipality of Silvano d'Orba contains the frazioni (subdivisions, mainly villages and hamlets) Valle Cochi, Pieve, Bacchetti, Guastarina, Pagliara, Villa, Milanesi, Setteventi, Ravino, Bolla, Pagliaccia, Bordini, Pianterasso, Bessica, Prieto, Castagnola, Caraffa, and Passada.

Silvano d'Orba borders the following municipalities: Capriata d'Orba, Castelletto d'Orba, Lerma, Ovada, Rocca Grimalda, and Tagliolo Monferrato.

Adorno Castle is located in the comune.

== Demographic evolution ==
Historical population

Year	Pop.	±%
1861	2,295	—
1871	2,464	+7.4%
1881	2,727	+10.7%
1901	3,198	+17.3%
1911	3,159	−1.2%

Year	Pop.	±%
1921	2,843	−10.0%
1931	2,631	−7.5%
1936	2,472	−6.0%
1951	2,235	−9.6%
1961	1,931	−13.6%

Year	Pop.	±%
1971	1,769	−8.4%
1981	1,757	−0.7%
1991	1,775	+1.0%
2001	1,830	+3.1%

Source: Data from ISTAT
