= Casal Cermelli =

- Comune
- Comune di Casal Cermelli
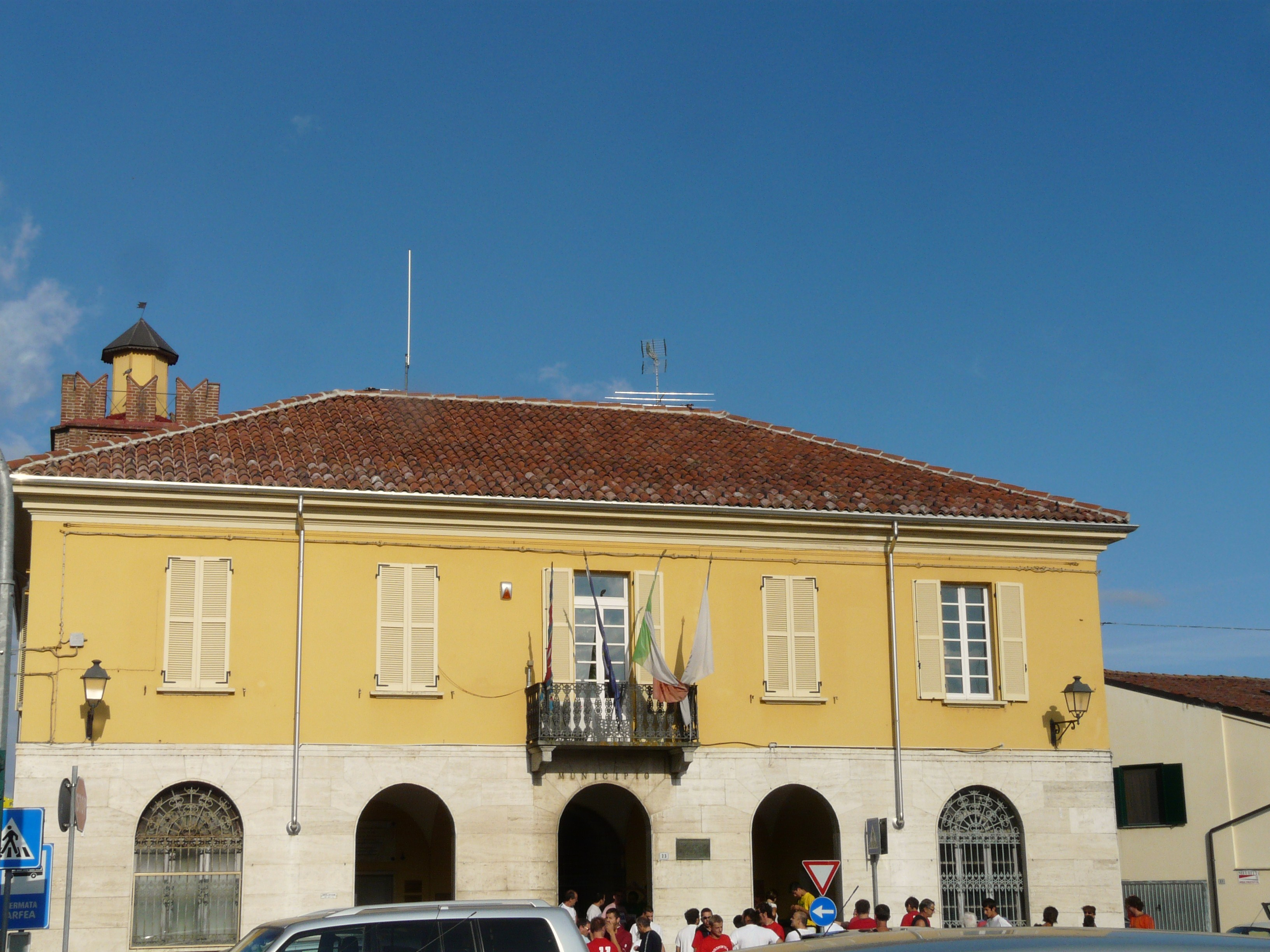
- Town hall

- Coat of arms

- Location within Italy Location within Piedmont
- Coordinates: 44°50′N 8°37′E
- Country: Italy
- Region: Piedmont
- Province: Alessandria (AL)
- Frazioni: Fantanasse, Portanova, Rossina

Government
  - Mayor: Antonella Cermelli

Area
  - Total: 11.7 km^{2} (4.5 sq mi)
- Elevation: 102 m (335 ft)

Population (31 May 2017)
  - Total: 1,224
  - Density: 105/km^{2} (271/sq mi)
- Demonym: Casalcermellesi
- Time zone: UTC+1 (CET)
  - Summer (DST): UTC+2 (CEST)
- Postal code: 15072
- Dialing code: 0131
- Website: Official website

Casal Cermelli is a comune (municipality) in the Province of Alessandria in the Italian region Piedmont, located about 80 kilometres (50 mi) southeast of Turin and about 9 kilometres (6 mi) south of Alessandria.

Casal Cermelli borders the following municipalities: Bosco Marengo, Castellazzo Bormida, Frugarolo, and Predosa. Its hamlets (frazioni) are the villages of Fantanasse, Portanova, and Rossina.
