= Castelletto d'Orba =

- Comune
- Comune di Castelletto d'Orba
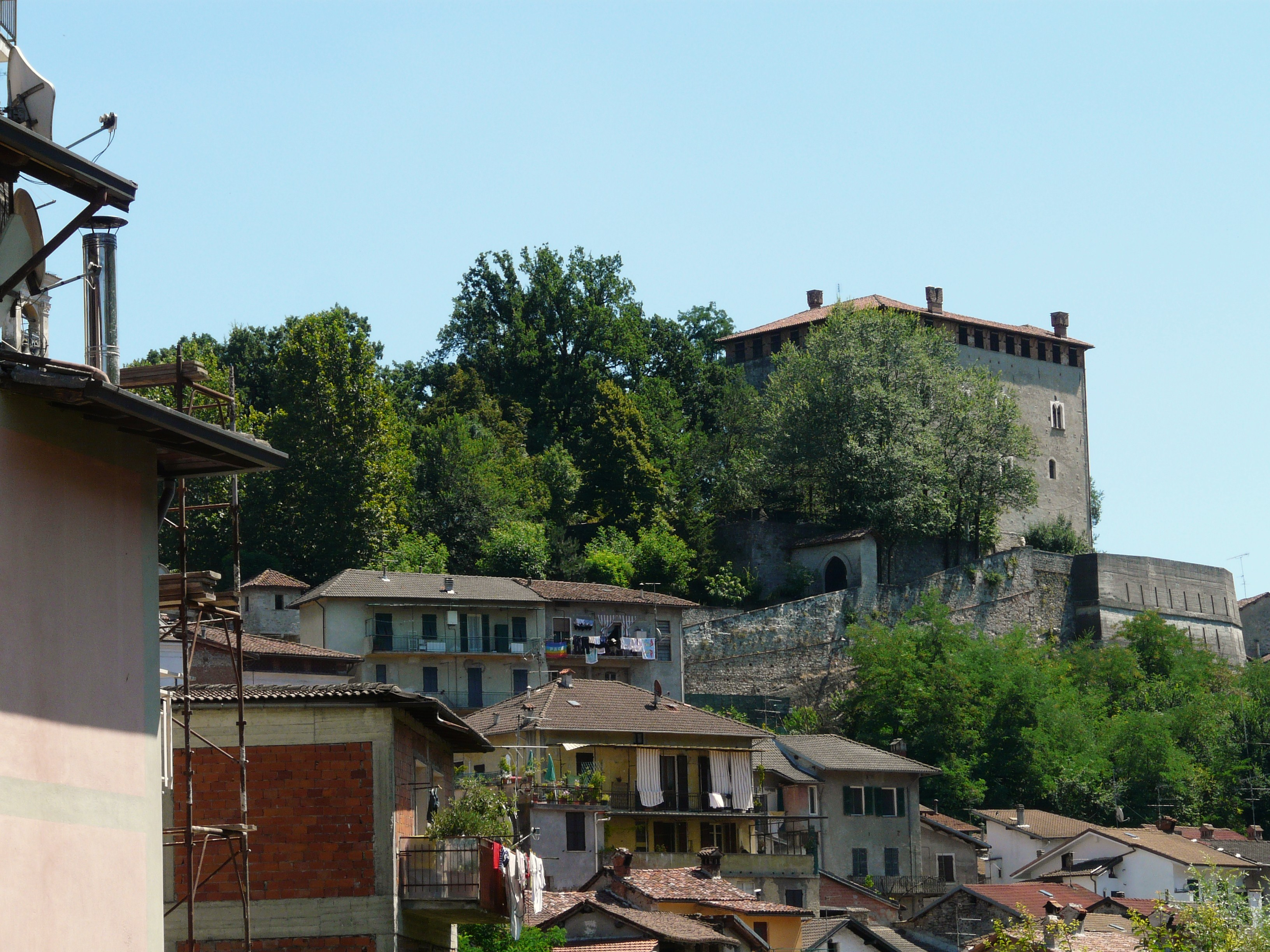

- Coat of arms

- Location within Italy Location within Piedmont
- Coordinates: 44°41′N 8°42′E
- Country: Italy
- Region: Piedmont
- Province: Alessandria (AL)
- Frazioni: Cazzuli, Crebini, Passaronda

Government
  - Mayor: Mario Pesce

Area
  - Total: 13.98 km^{2} (5.40 sq mi)
- Elevation: 200 m (660 ft)

Population (31 May 2018)
  - Total: 1,958
  - Density: 140.1/km^{2} (362.7/sq mi)
- Demonym: Castellettesi
- Time zone: UTC+1 (CET)
  - Summer (DST): UTC+2 (CEST)
- Postal code: 15060
- Dialing code: 0143
- Website: Official website

Castelletto d'Orba is a comune (municipality) in the Province of Alessandria in the Italian region Piedmont, located about 90 kilometres (56 mi) southeast of Turin and about 25 kilometres (16 mi) south of Alessandria.

Castelletto d'Orba borders the following municipalities: Capriata d'Orba, Lerma, Montaldeo, San Cristoforo, and Silvano d'Orba.
