= San Giorgio, Carpeneto =

Church in Carpeneto, Italy

Coordinates: 44.68225°N 8.609883°E

San Giorgio is a Baroque-style Roman Catholic parish church in the town of Carpeneto, province of Alessandria, region of Piedmont, Italy.

== History ==
A church at the site likely existed by the 14th century, although there is no documentation from pastoral visits in the 16th century, when it was found in poor condition. In 1610, a new parish church structure was recommended, although construction would lag for over a century until 1719–1727, when the present layout was generally completed. It was built adjacent to the castle walls. In 1764, a parish house was built adjacent to the church.

The Capella di San Giorgio is found in the local cemetery.
