= Fresonara =

- Comune
- Comune di Fresonara
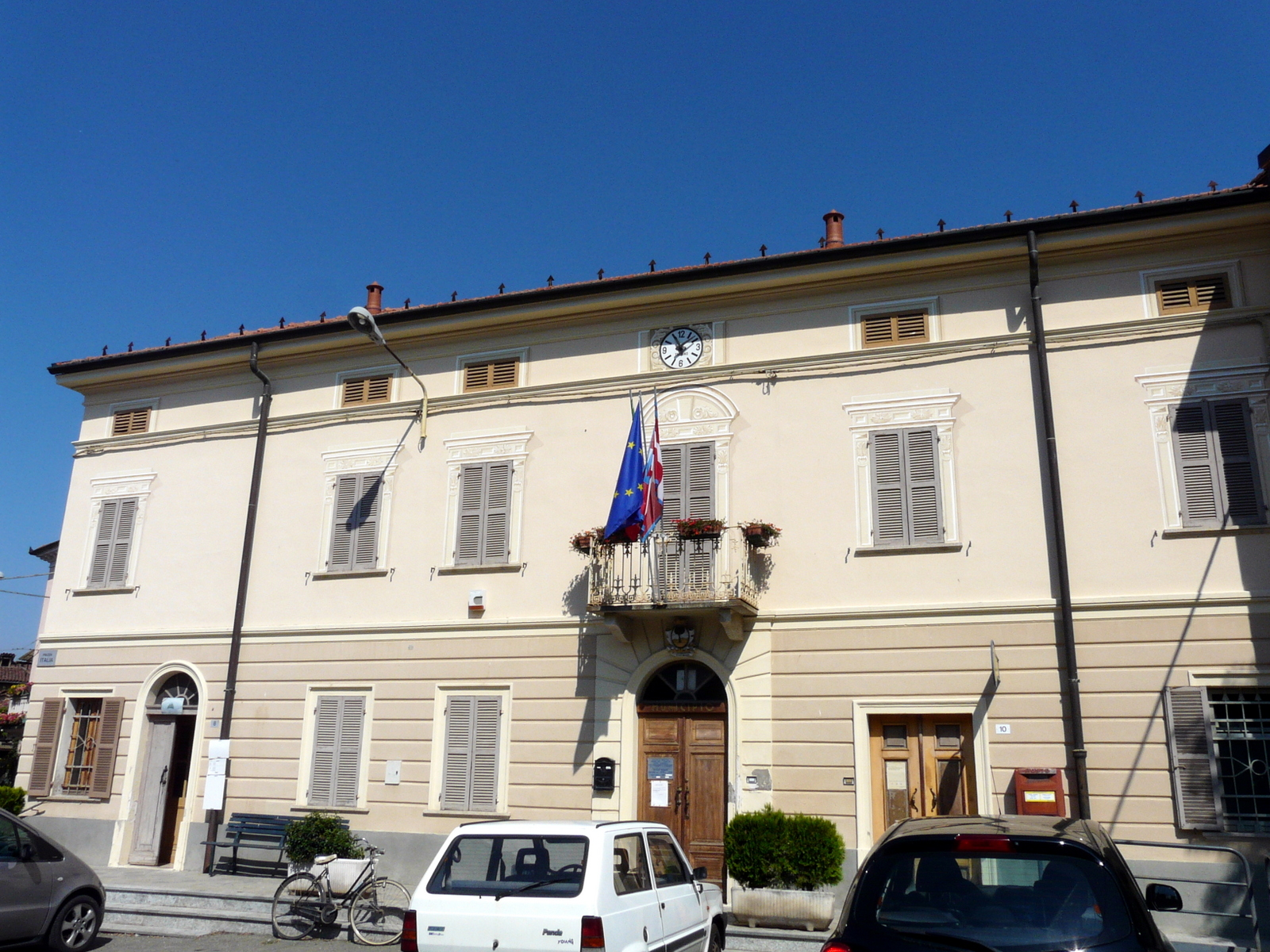
- Town hall.

- Coat of arms

- Location within Italy Location within Piedmont
- Coordinates: 44°46′N 8°41′E
- Country: Italy
- Region: Piedmont
- Province: Alessandria (AL)

Government
  - Mayor: Paola Penovi

Area
  - Total: 6.93 km^{2} (2.68 sq mi)
- Elevation: 143 m (469 ft)

Population (31 July 2017)
  - Total: 660
  - Density: 95/km^{2} (250/sq mi)
- Demonym: Fresonaresi
- Time zone: UTC+1 (CET)
  - Summer (DST): UTC+2 (CEST)
- Postal code: 15060
- Dialing code: 0143
- Saint day: September 8
- Website: Official website

Fresonara (Piedmontese: Fërsnèira) is a comune (municipality) in the province of Alessandria in the Italian region Piedmont, located about 80 kilometres (50 mi) southeast of Turin and about 15 kilometres (9 mi) southeast of Alessandria.

Fresonara borders the following municipalities: Basaluzzo, Bosco Marengo, and Predosa.

In 1404 it was destroyed by Facino Cane. It was annexed to the possessione of the House of Savoy in the 18th century.
