= Predosa =

- Comune
- Comune di Predosa
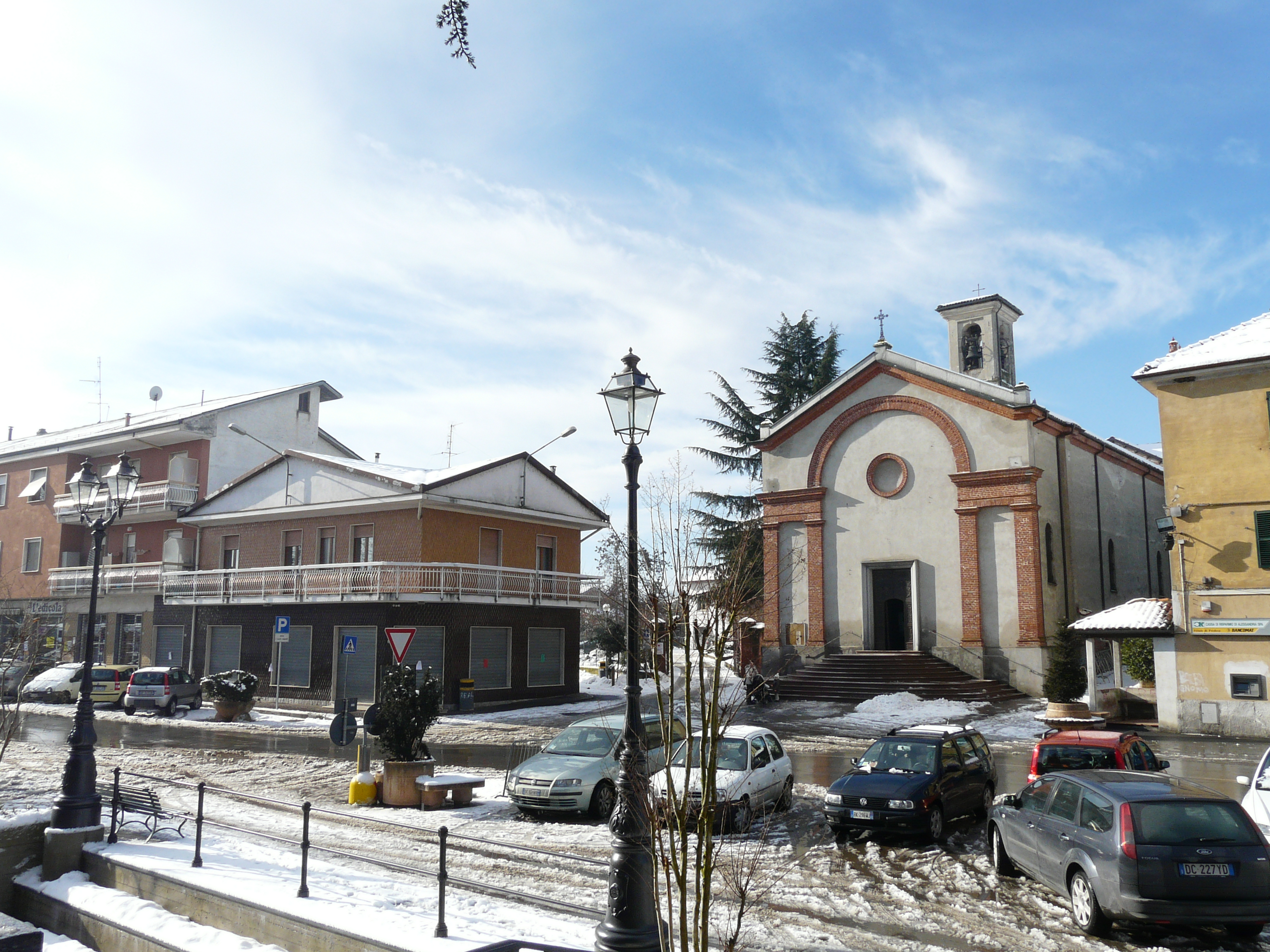

- Coat of arms

- Location within Italy Location within Piedmont
- Coordinates: 44°45′N 8°39′E
- Country: Italy
- Region: Piedmont
- Province: Alessandria (AL)
- Frazioni: Retorto, Castelferro, Mantovana

Government
  - Mayor: Giancarlo Rapetti

Area
  - Total: 32.9 km^{2} (12.7 sq mi)
- Elevation: 136 m (446 ft)

Population (31 December 2017)
  - Total: 2,010
  - Density: 61.1/km^{2} (158/sq mi)
- Demonym: Predosini
- Time zone: UTC+1 (CET)
  - Summer (DST): UTC+2 (CEST)
- Postal code: 15077
- Dialing code: 0131
- Website: Official website

Predosa is a comune (municipality) in the Province of Alessandria in the Italian region Piedmont, located about 80 kilometres (50 mi) southeast of Turin and about 20 kilometres (12 mi) south of Alessandria.

Predosa borders the following municipalities: Basaluzzo, Bosco Marengo, Capriata d'Orba, Carpeneto, Casal Cermelli, Castellazzo Bormida, Castelspina, Fresonara, Rocca Grimalda, and Sezzadio.
