= Capriata d'Orba =

- Comune
- Comune di Capriata d'Orba
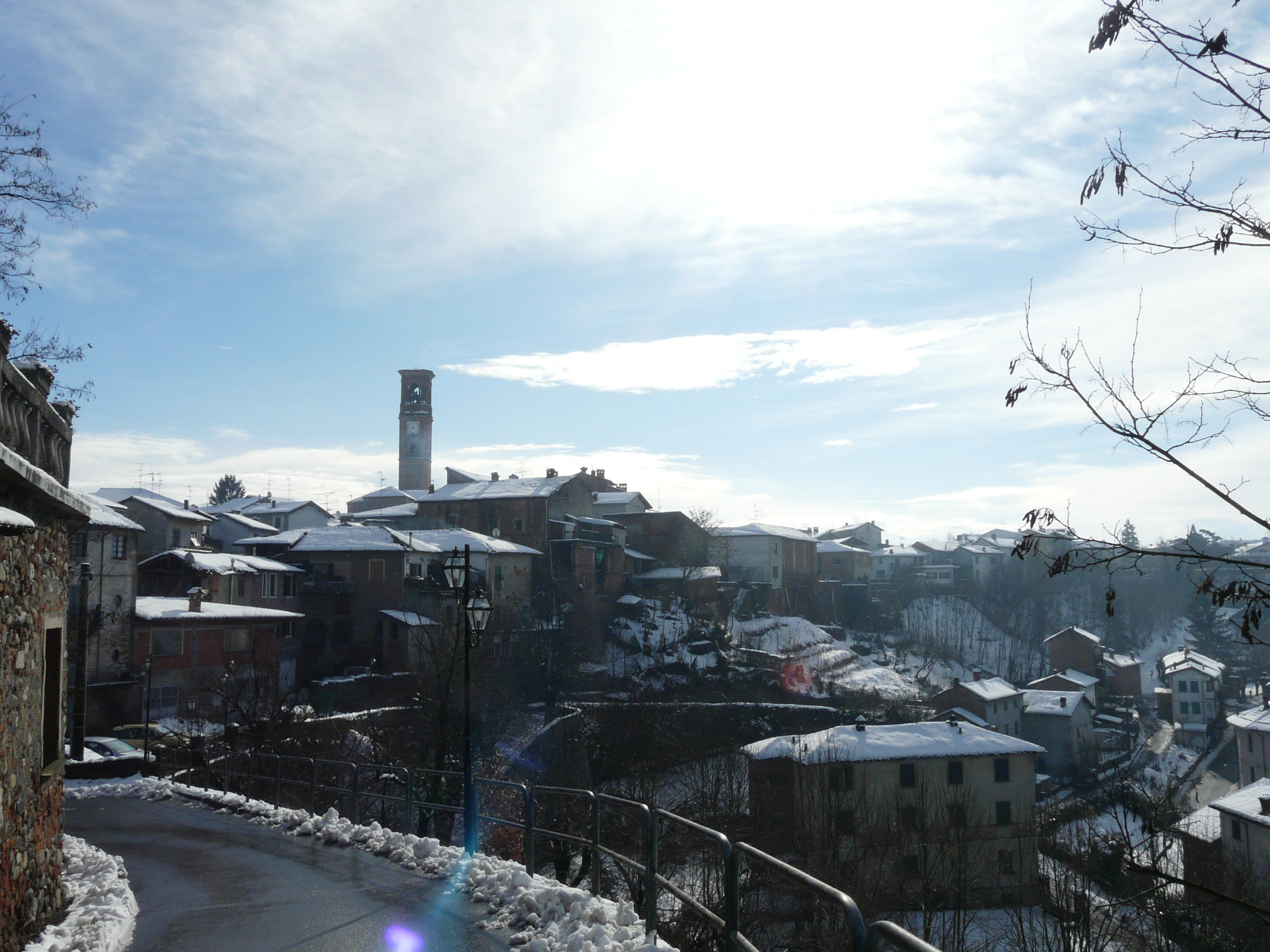

- Coat of arms

- Location within Italy Location within Piedmont
- Coordinates: 44°43′N 8°41′E
- Country: Italy
- Region: Piedmont
- Province: Alessandria (AL)

Government
  - Mayor: Maria Cristina Dameri

Area
  - Total: 28.47 km^{2} (10.99 sq mi)
- Elevation: 176 m (577 ft)

Population (31 December 2019)
  - Total: 1,835
  - Density: 64.45/km^{2} (166.9/sq mi)
- Demonym: Capriatesi
- Time zone: UTC+1 (CET)
  - Summer (DST): UTC+2 (CEST)
- Postal code: 15060
- Dialing code: 0143
- Website: Official website

Capriata d'Orba is a comune (municipality) in the Province of Alessandria in the Italian region Piedmont, located about 90 kilometres (56 mi) southeast of Turin and about 25 kilometres (16 mi) south of Alessandria. As of 31 December 2004, it had a population of 1,862 and an area of 28.3 square kilometres (10.9 mi^{2}).

Capriata d'Orba borders the following municipalities: Basaluzzo, Castelletto d'Orba, Francavilla Bisio, Predosa, Rocca Grimalda, San Cristoforo, and Silvano d'Orba.
