= Adorno Castle =

Castle in Piedmont, Italy

- Castello Adorno
- Silvano d'Orba, Piedmont, Italy
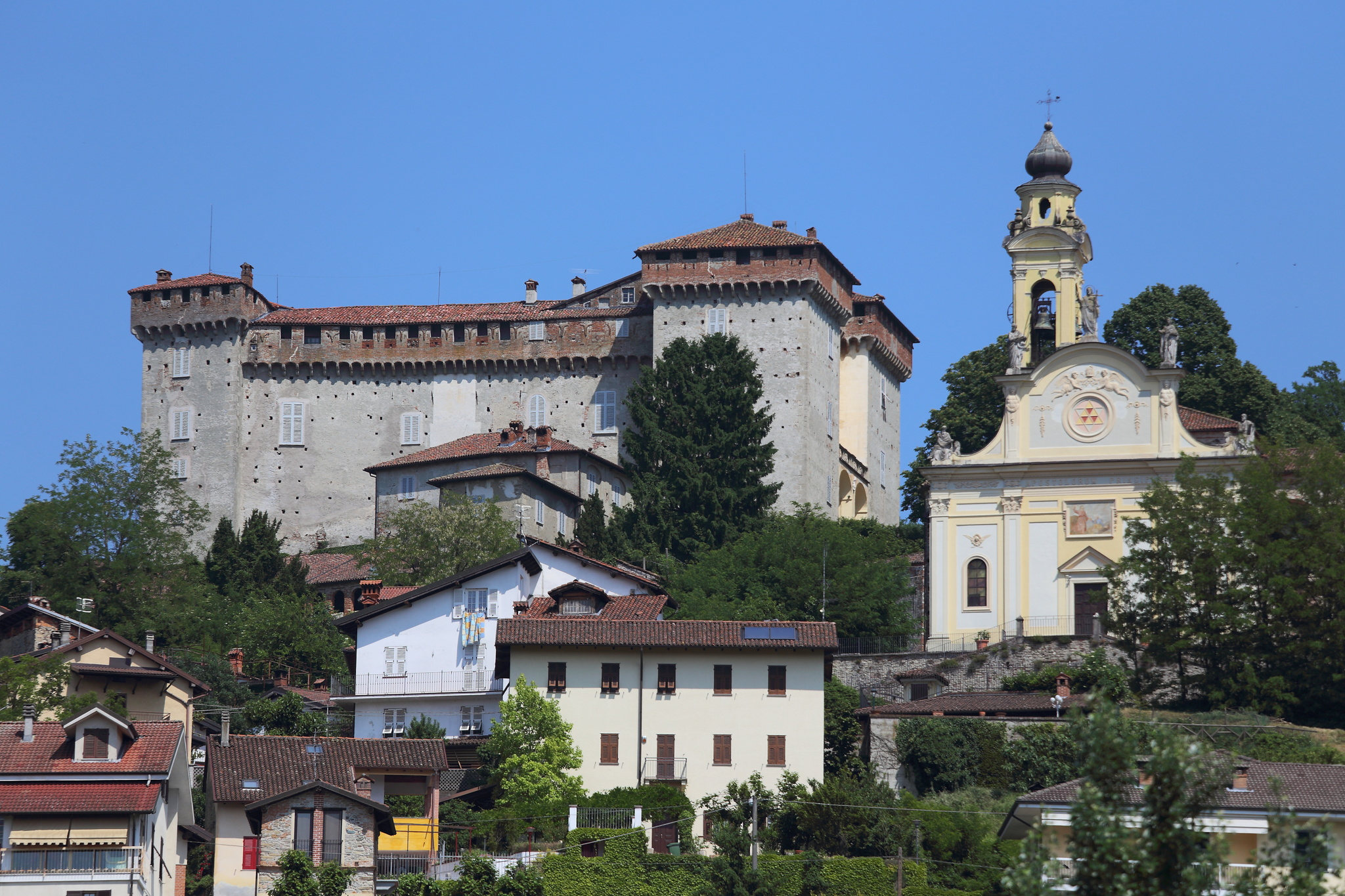
- Adorno Castle in 2015

Site information
- Type: Castle

Location
- Coordinates: 44°40′51.05″N 8°40′36.86″E

Adorno Castle (Italian: Castello Adorno), also known as Silvano d'Orba Castle (Italian: Castello di Silvano d'Orba), is a castle located in Silvano d'Orba, Piedmont, Italy.

== History ==
The castle was built between 1446, when the fief was granted to the noble Adorno family, and 1492, the year in which the works were completed, as reported by an inscription on the building. For centuries, the castle remained the property of the Adorno family; upon the death of their last male heir in 1634, it passed by inheritance to the Botta-Adorno line. Later, towards the end of the 19th century, it was acquired by the Genoese banker Enrico Belimbau. In 1991 it passed to the Iannoni family, who still own it today.

== Description ==
The stone-built castle has a quadrangular layout and is equipped with four corner towers and projecting battlements. It is arranged over three floors around a central courtyard, which is porticoed on two sides. The main entrance, consisting of two symmetrical portals, is located on the northern façade, while the garden-facing façade is distinguished by two larger towers overlooking a terraced garden.

== Gallery ==
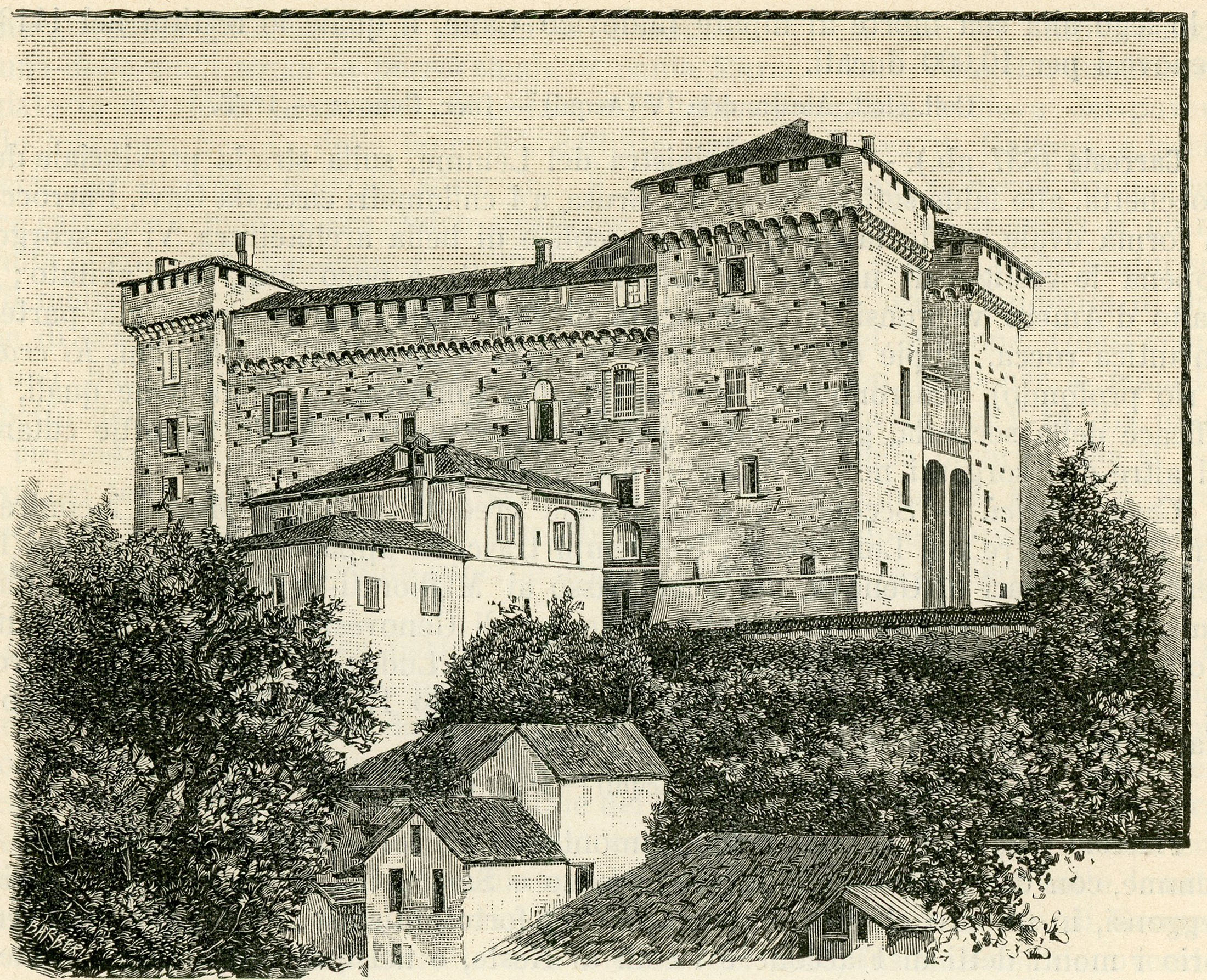

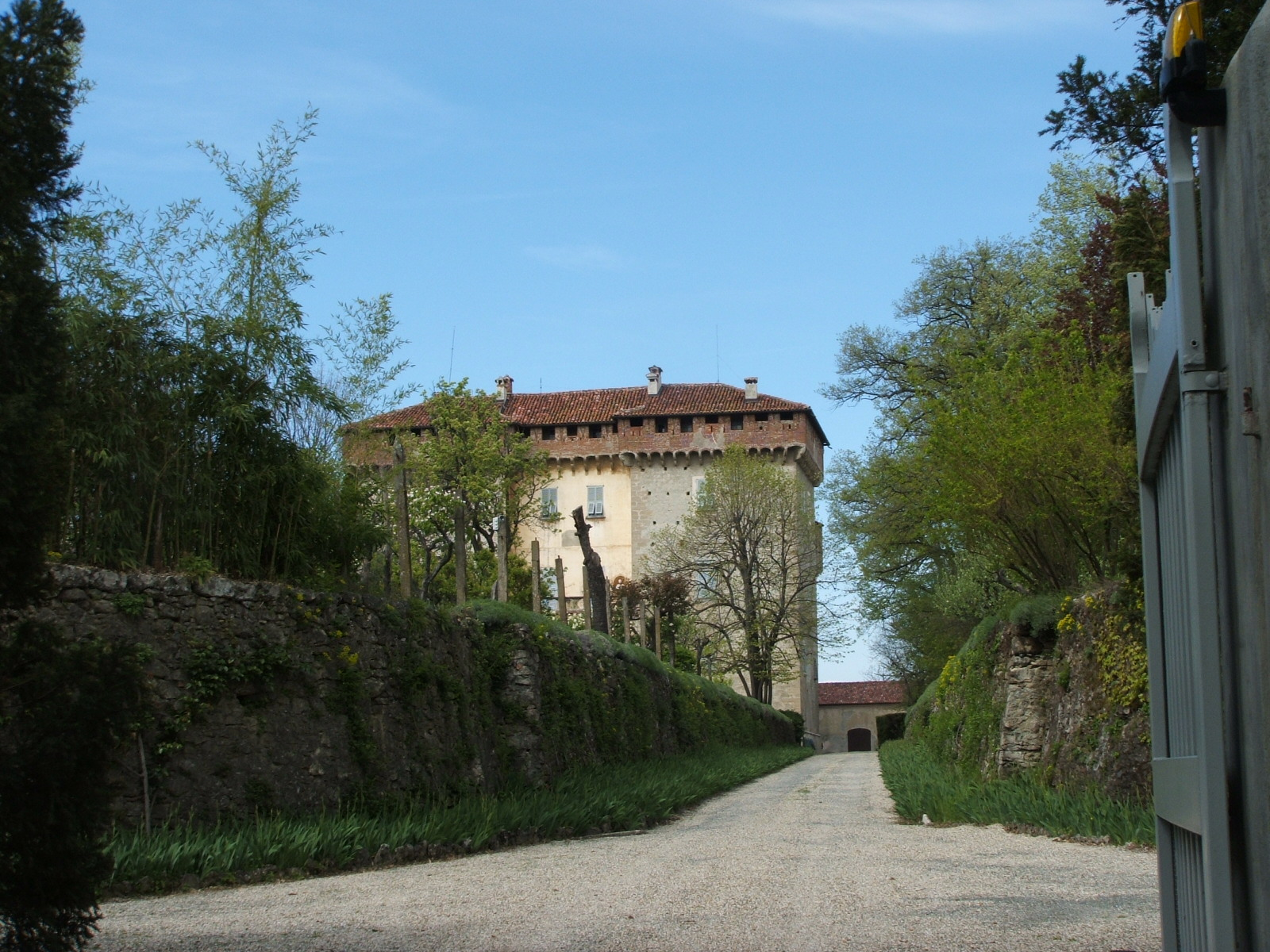

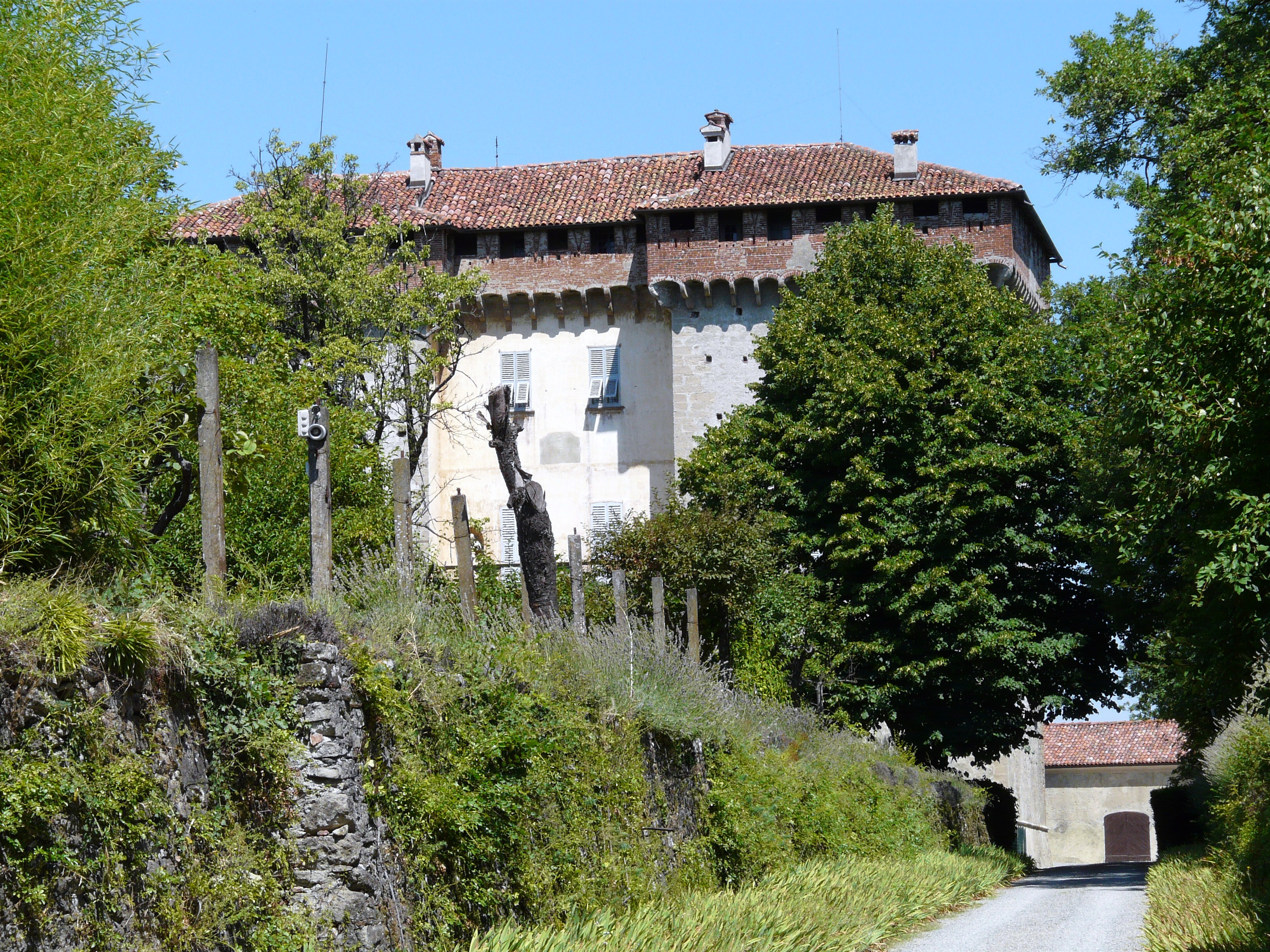
