= Basaluzzo =

- Comune
- Comune di Basaluzzo
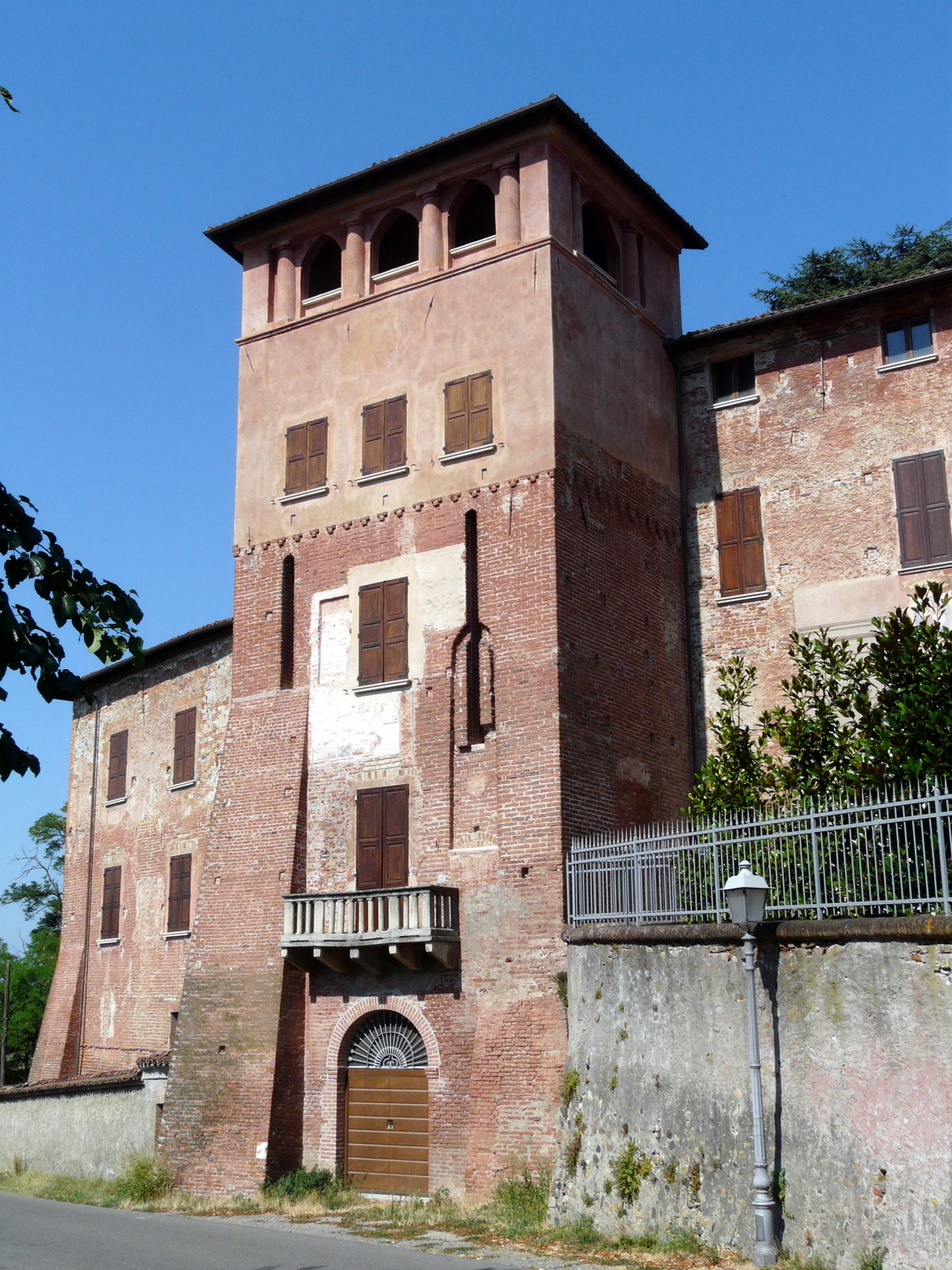
- Castle of Basaluzzo.

- Coat of arms

- Location within Italy Location within Piedmont
- Coordinates: 44°45′N 8°42′E
- Country: Italy
- Region: Piedmont
- Province: Alessandria (AL)
- Frazioni: S. Antonio

Government
  - Mayor: Gianfranco Ludovici

Area
  - Total: 15.05 km^{2} (5.81 sq mi)
- Elevation: 149 m (489 ft)

Population (31 December 2019)
  - Total: 2,063
  - Density: 137.1/km^{2} (355.0/sq mi)
- Demonym: Basaluzzesi
- Time zone: UTC+1 (CET)
  - Summer (DST): UTC+2 (CEST)
- Postal code: 15060
- Dialing code: 0143
- Website: Official website

Basaluzzo is a comune (municipality) in the Province of Alessandria in the Italian region Piedmont, located about 90 kilometres (56 mi) southeast of Turin and about 20 kilometres (12 mi) southeast of Alessandria.

Basaluzzo borders the following municipalities: Bosco Marengo, Capriata d'Orba, Francavilla Bisio, Fresonara, Novi Ligure, Pasturana, and Predosa.
