= Frugarolo =

- Comune
- Comune di Frugarolo
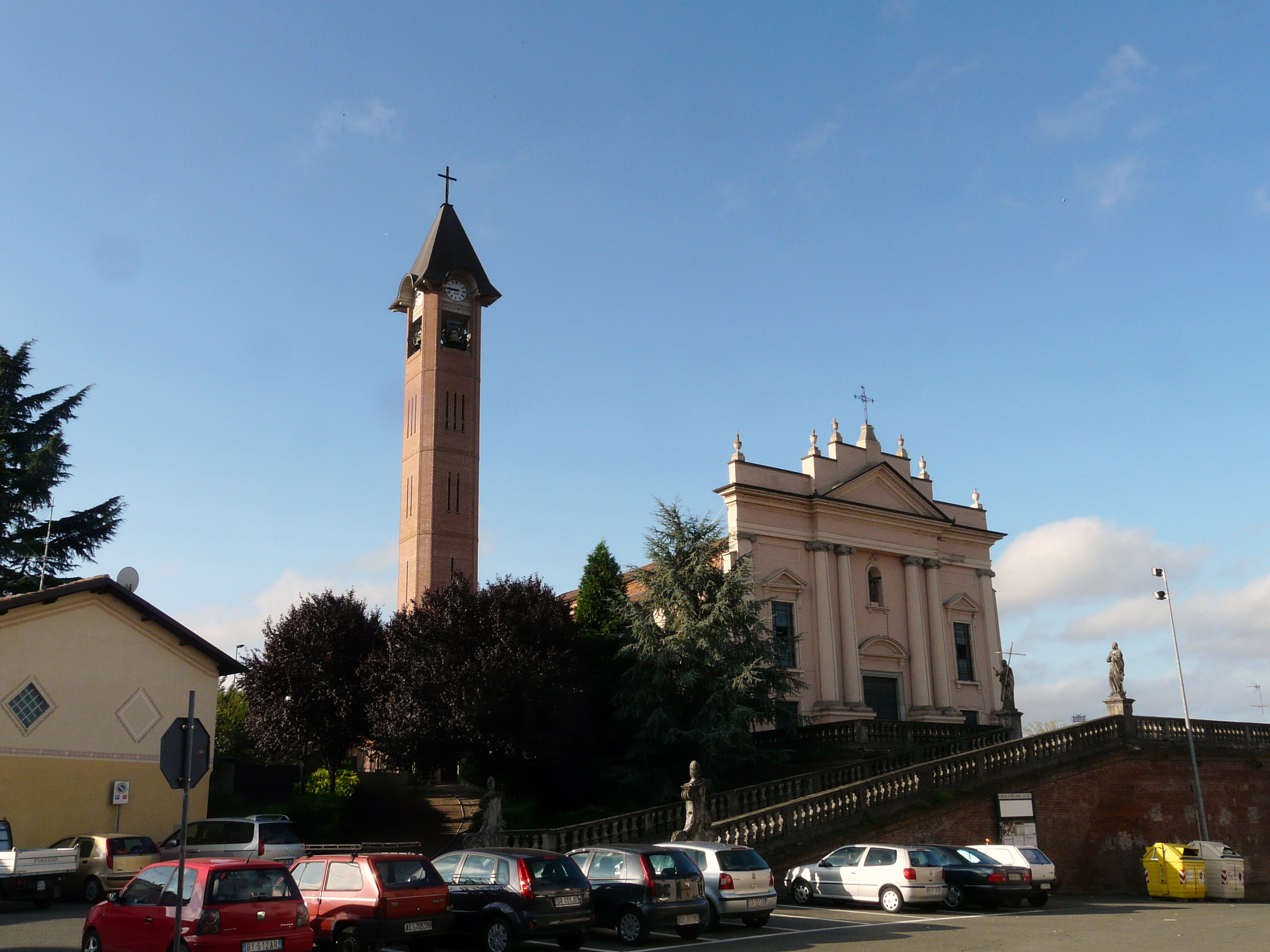
- Parish church of St. Felix

- Coat of arms

- Location within Italy Location within Piedmont
- Coordinates: 44°50′N 8°41′E
- Country: Italy
- Region: Piedmont
- Province: Alessandria (AL)
- Frazioni: Cabannoni, Mandrino

Government
  - Mayor: Martino Giovanni Pio Valdenassi

Area
  - Total: 27.06 km^{2} (10.45 sq mi)
- Elevation: 112 m (367 ft)

Population (31 August 2017)
  - Total: 1,960
  - Density: 72.4/km^{2} (188/sq mi)
- Demonym: Frugarolesi
- Time zone: UTC+1 (CET)
  - Summer (DST): UTC+2 (CEST)
- Postal code: 15065
- Dialing code: 0131
- Website: Official website

Frugarolo is a comune (municipality) in the Province of Alessandria in the Italian region Piedmont, located about 80 kilometres (50 mi) southeast of Turin and about 11 kilometres (7 mi) southeast of Alessandria.

Frugarolo borders the following municipalities: Alessandria, Bosco Marengo, Casal Cermelli, and Castellazzo Bormida.
