= Bosco Marengo =

Bosco Marengo Ël Bòsch (Piedmontese)
- Comune
- Comune di Bosco Marengo
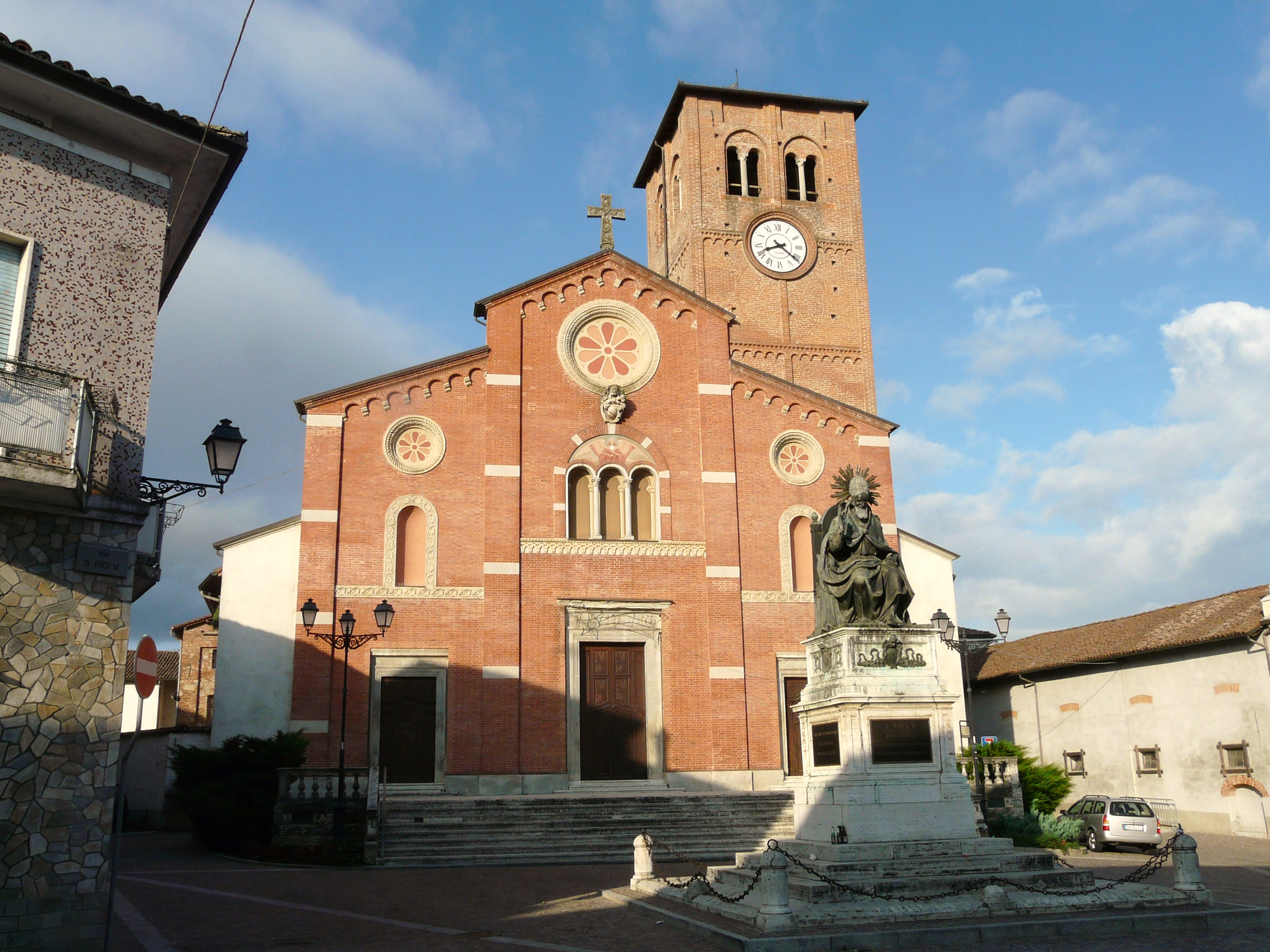
- Parish church and Monument to Pope Pius V

- Coat of arms

- Location within Italy Location within Piedmont
- Coordinates: 44°49′N 8°40′E
- Country: Italy
- Region: Piedmont
- Province: Alessandria (AL)
- Frazioni: Levata, Pollastra, Quattro Cascine

Government
  - Mayor: Gianfranco Gazzaniga

Area
  - Total: 44.53 km^{2} (17.19 sq mi)
- Elevation: 121 m (397 ft)

Population (31 August 2019)
  - Total: 2,314
  - Density: 51.96/km^{2} (134.6/sq mi)
- Demonym: Boschesi
- Time zone: UTC+1 (CET)
  - Summer (DST): UTC+2 (CEST)
- Postal code: 15062
- Dialing code: 0131
- Patron saint: St. Pius V
- Saint day: April 30
- Website: Official website

Bosco Marengo (Italian: [ˈbosko maˈreŋɡo]; Piedmontese: Ël Bòsch [əl ˈbɔsk]) is a town and a comune (municipality) in the Province of Alessandria in the Italian region Piedmont, located about 80 kilometres (50 mi) southeast of Turin and about 12 kilometres (7 mi) southeast of Alessandria.

Bosco Marengo borders the following municipalities: Alessandria, Basaluzzo, Casal Cermelli, Fresonara, Frugarolo, Novi Ligure, Pozzolo Formigaro, Predosa, and Tortona.

== Nuclear enrichment plant ==
There was a nuclear enrichment plant in Bosco Marengo, which started operating in 1973. The site was handed to SOGIN, the Italian nuclear decommissioning authority in 2005 and, in December 2008, it was decided that it should be decommissioned. The process was completed on 31 December 2021.

== People ==
- Pope Pius V (1504–1572)
- Michele Bonelli (1541–1598), cardinal and papal diplomat.
- Antonio Salvarezza (1902–1985), operatic tenor
