= San Cristoforo =

- Comune
- Comune di San Cristoforo
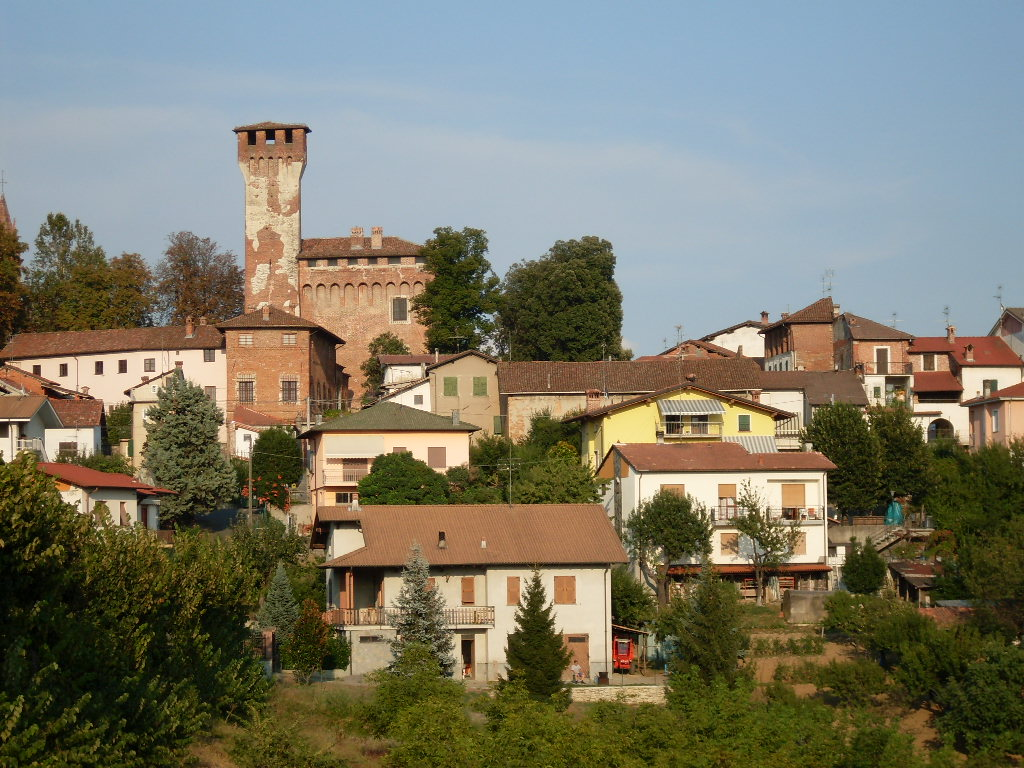

- Location within Italy Location within Piedmont
- Coordinates: 44°41′N 8°45′E
- Country: Italy
- Region: Piedmont
- Province: Province of Alessandria (AL)

Government
  - Mayor: Monica Ghio

Area
  - Total: 3.6 km^{2} (1.4 sq mi)
- Elevation: 301 m (988 ft)

Population (Dec. 2004)
  - Total: 595
  - Density: 170/km^{2} (430/sq mi)
- Demonym: Sancristoforesi
- Time zone: UTC+1 (CET)
  - Summer (DST): UTC+2 (CEST)
- Postal code: 15060
- Dialing code: 0143

San Cristoforo (in local dialect San Cristòfi) is a comune (municipality) in the Province of Alessandria in the Italian region Piedmont, located about 90 kilometres (56 mi) southeast of Turin and about 30 kilometres (19 mi) southeast of Alessandria. As of 31 December 2004, it had a population of 595 and an area of 3.6 square kilometres (1.4 mi^{2}).

San Cristoforo borders the following municipalities: Capriata d'Orba, Castelletto d'Orba, Francavilla Bisio, Gavi, Montaldeo, and Parodi Ligure.

== History ==
Situated on an important way of communication that brought to the ancient city of Libarna, it rose around a watchtower: the so-called Tower of Gazzolo, today encompassed in the castle. A property of the Obertenghi family, it passed in 1313 in fief to the Spinola di Luccoli due to a disposition of emperor Henry VII . The village was devastated many times and occupied in 1625 by franc-savoiarde troops and in 1654 by the piedmontese troops. In the 16th century it passed to the Genoese Doria family as an imperial fief until 1732 when it became property of the Savoy kings.

== Castle ==
The castle of the Spinola is built from a complex of buildings hedged by walls, in which the parochial church is comprised. The castle is a quadrilateral hedged by a ditch, built around to the ancient tower of the Gazzolo. To the west of the castle, the Casa Lunga (long house), building of the 15th century, today are used like building of representation of the comune (municipality), whereas to east the foresteria (guest quarters) is situated, a time connected through a passage to the nail head of the parochial church. This church is dedicated to martyr S.Cristoforo, it is built of the 15th century, but redecorated and widened in the 1800, conserve three statues dedicated to Nostra Signora del Carmelo, to San Cristoforo and to Madonna del S. Rosario.

== Demographic evolution ==
Historical population

Year	Pop.	±%
1861	793	—
1871	831	+4.8%
1881	924	+11.2%
1901	993	+7.5%
1911	1,028	+3.5%

Year	Pop.	±%
1921	1,024	−0.4%
1931	1,049	+2.4%
1936	1,014	−3.3%
1951	827	−18.4%
1961	744	−10.0%

Year	Pop.	±%
1971	686	−7.8%
1981	613	−10.6%
1991	572	−6.7%
2001	575	+0.5%

Source: Data from ISTAT
