= Antonio Salvarezza =

Italian opera singer

- Antonio Salvarezza (photo with 1949 dedication)
- Occupation: tenor opera singer

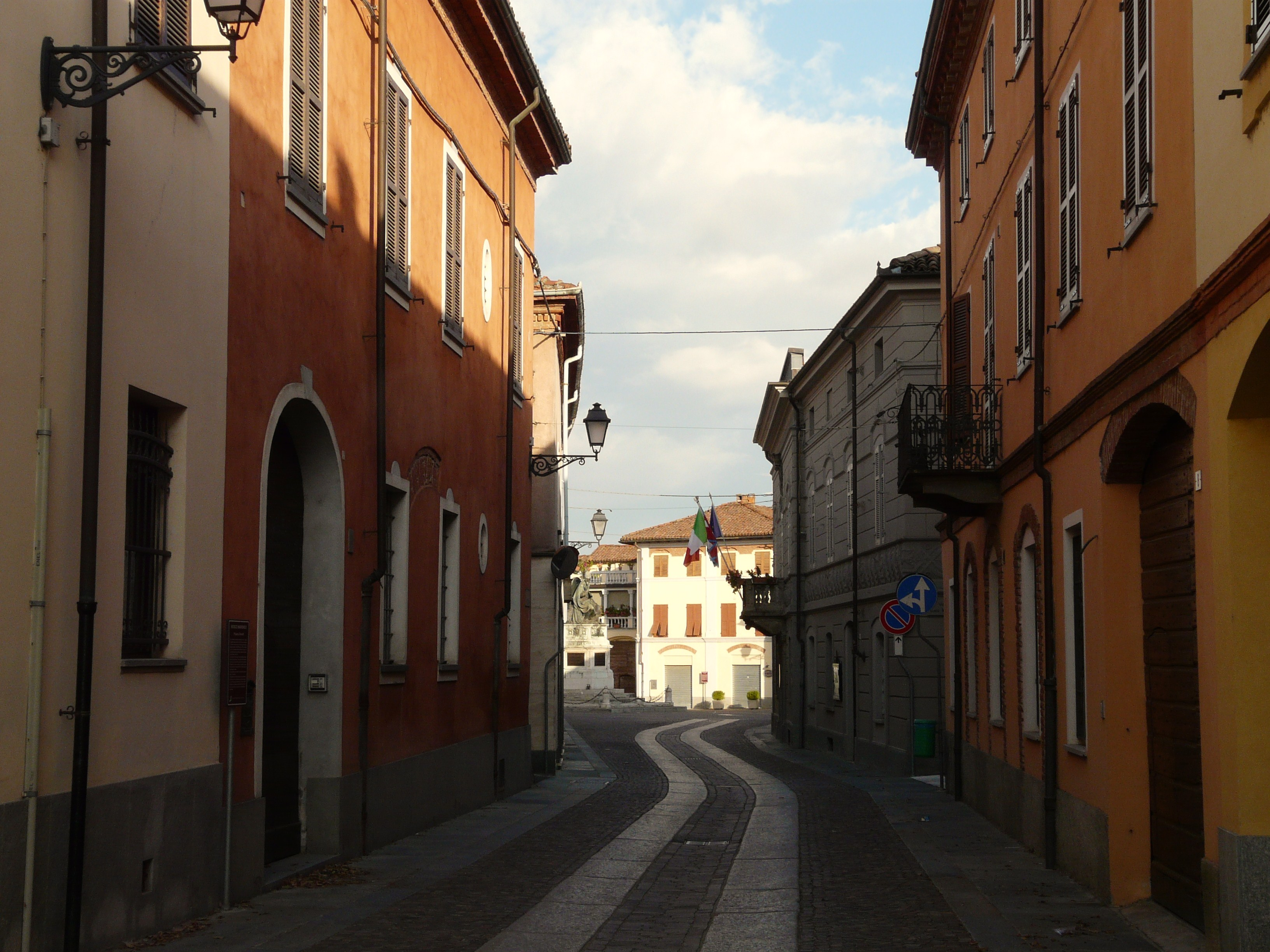
Bosco Marengo, the town where Salvarezza was born

Antonio Salvarezza (Bosco Marengo, Italy, 14 May 1902 – Bosco Marengo, 24 July 1985) was an Italian tenor.

== Biography ==
The lyric tenor, noted for his voice "of full timbre with ease and strength in the higher register", studied singing with the maestro Filippo Florio.

Florio made his debut on 6 April 1937 at the Teatro Municipal in Rio de Janeiro, as the Duke of Mantua in Rigoletto. During his career, he performed at many of world's important theaters, notably those in North and South America, 806 performances in total.

His repertoire included thirty or so roles, ranging from classicism to Verismo. Salvarezza achieved high critical and public acclaim for his work with Puccini, especially as Mario Cavaradossi in Tosca .

He worked alongside many great singers such as Maria Callas, Renata Tebaldi, Tito Gobbi, Rolando Panerai, Virginia Zeani, Toti Dal Monte, Mario Basiola, Giuseppe Taddei. In 1952, during the 15th Maggio Musicale Fiorentino, he sang as Eustazio in Armida, by Rossini, with Maria Callas.

In the 1950s he recorded studio arias for the record company Cetra, along with two live recordings of complete operas; the aforementioned Armida and William Tell.

== Discography ==
"Di quella pira" from Verdi's Il trovatore, Parlophone PO 95
Performed by Salvarezza

=== Singles ===
- Giacomo Puccini, Turandot: "Nessun dorma" – Cetra AT 0131
- Giacomo Puccini, La bohème: "O Mimì tu píu non torni" with Rolando Panerai
- Giuseppe Verdi, Il trovatore: "Di quella pira" – Cetra 25151
- Giuseppe Verdi, Il trovatore: Final third act, with Caterina Mancini and Rolando Panerai
- Jules Massenet, Manon: "Ah, dispar, vision"
- Charles Gounod, Faust: "Hail abode" – Zither 25152.
- Friedrich von Flotow, Martha: "He appeared to me".
- Giuseppe Verdi, Luisa Miller: "When the evenings are quiet" – Cetra CB 20477.

=== Complete operas ===
- Gioachino Rossini, Armida. Cast: Maria Callas, Mario Filippeschi, Gianni Raimondi, Antonio Salvarezza, Francesco Albanese, Alessandro Ziliani, Mario Frosini, Marco Stefanoni. Orchestra e coro of the Teatro Comunale of Florence, conductor Tullio Serafin. Live recording, 26 April 1952.
- Gioachino Rossini, William Tell. Cast: Antonio Salvarezza, Henk Meyer, Frans De Geus, Leon Colombe, Timo Jacobs, Elsa Van Bueren, Nelli Smit, Anton Eldering, Guus Hoekman, Marisa Mari, Scipio Colombo. Conductor Willem Lohoff. Live recording, 20 April 1953.
