= Morbello =

- Comune
- Comune di Morbello
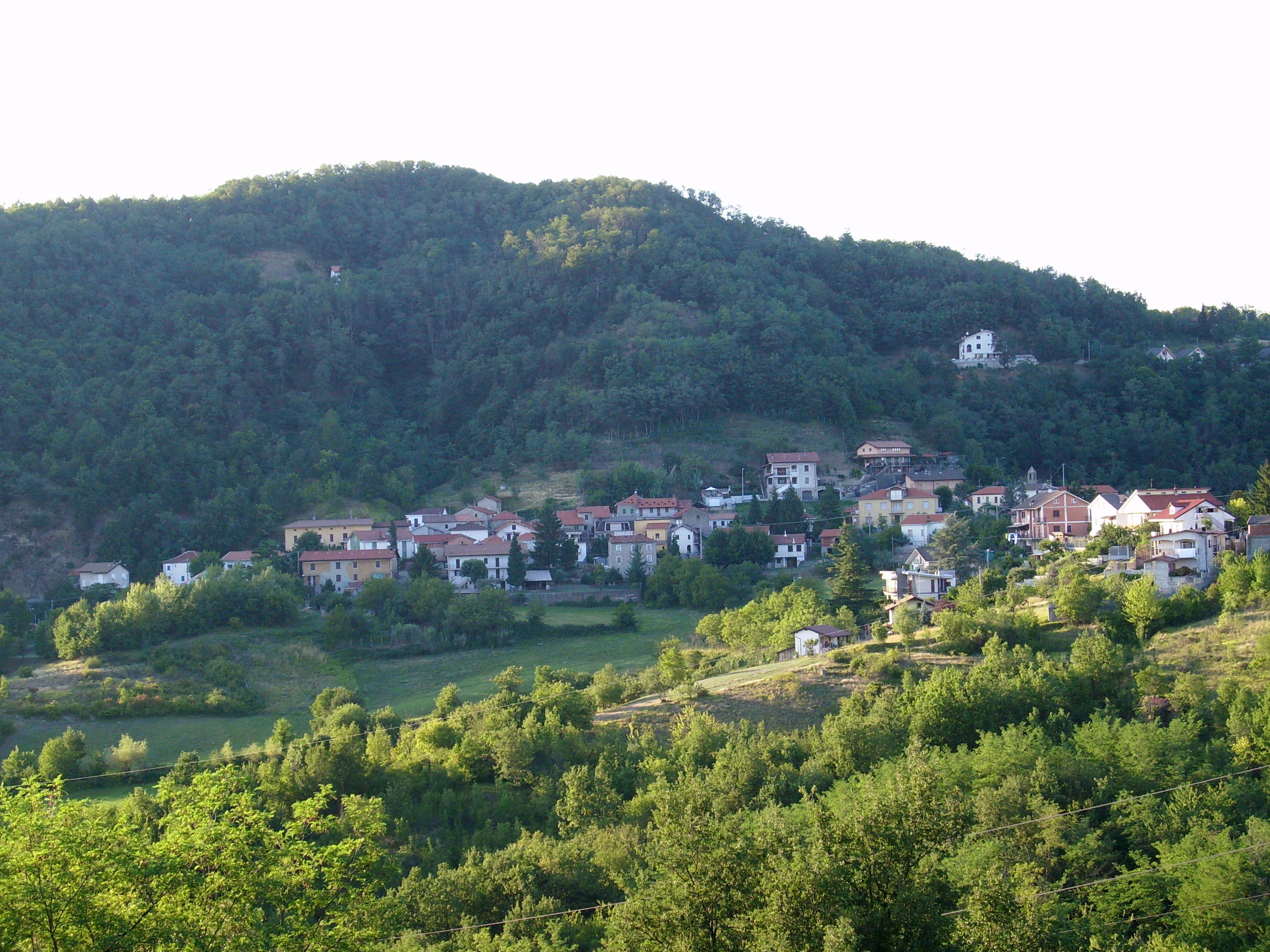
- The frazione of Vallosi.

- Coat of arms

- Location within Italy Location within Piedmont
- Coordinates: 44°36′22″N 8°30′42″E
- Country: Italy
- Region: Piedmont
- Province: Alessandria (AL)
- Frazioni: Piazza, Costa, Vallosi

Government
  - Mayor: Gianguido Pesce

Area
  - Total: 23.30 km^{2} (9.00 sq mi)
- Elevation: 402 m (1,319 ft)

Population (2005)
  - Total: 457
  - Density: 19.6/km^{2} (50.8/sq mi)
- Demonym: Morbellesi
- Time zone: UTC+1 (CET)
  - Summer (DST): UTC+2 (CEST)
- Postal code: 15010
- Dialing code: 0144

Morbello (piedmontese: Mirbé) is a comune in of the province of Alessandria, in the Italian region of Piedmont. It is located in Upper Montferrat.

It was founded in 1200, and was the birthplace of Domenico Nano, the poet.
