= Carrosio =

- Comune
- Comune di Carrosio
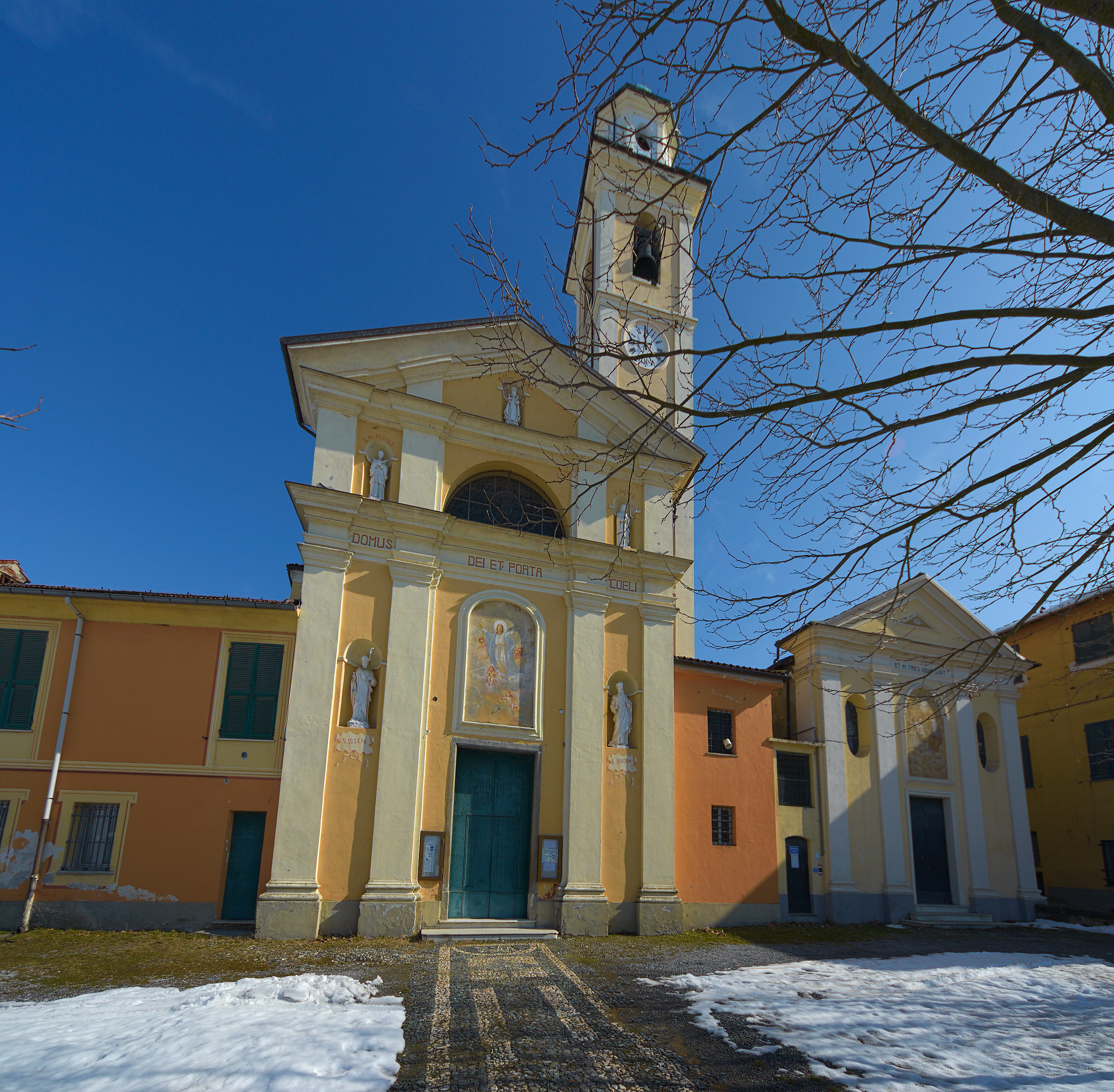

- Location within Italy Location within Piedmont
- Coordinates: 44°39′N 8°49′E
- Country: Italy
- Region: Piedmont
- Province: Province of Alessandria (AL)

Area
  - Total: 7.2 km^{2} (2.8 sq mi)
- Elevation: 254 m (833 ft)

Population (Dec. 2004)
  - Total: 468
  - Density: 65/km^{2} (170/sq mi)
- Demonym: Carrosiani
- Time zone: UTC+1 (CET)
  - Summer (DST): UTC+2 (CEST)
- Postal code: 15060
- Dialing code: 0143

Carrosio is a comune (municipality) in the Province of Alessandria in the Italian region Piedmont, located about 156 kilometres (97 mi) southeast of Turin and about 45 kilometres (28 mi) southeast of Alessandria. As of 31 December 2004, it had a population of 468 and an area of 7.2 square kilometres (2.8 mi^{2}).

Carrosio borders the following municipalities: Gavi and Voltaggio.

== Demographic evolution ==
Historical population

Year	Pop.	±%
1861	825	—
1871	863	+4.6%
1881	837	−3.0%
1901	909	+8.6%
1911	979	+7.7%

Year	Pop.	±%
1921	1,046	+6.8%
1931	1,054	+0.8%
1936	1,070	+1.5%
1951	880	−17.8%
1961	720	−18.2%

Year	Pop.	±%
1971	609	−15.4%
1981	490	−19.5%
1991	474	−3.3%
2001	465	−1.9%

Source: Data from ISTAT
