= Parodi Ligure =

- Comune
- Comune di Parodi Ligure
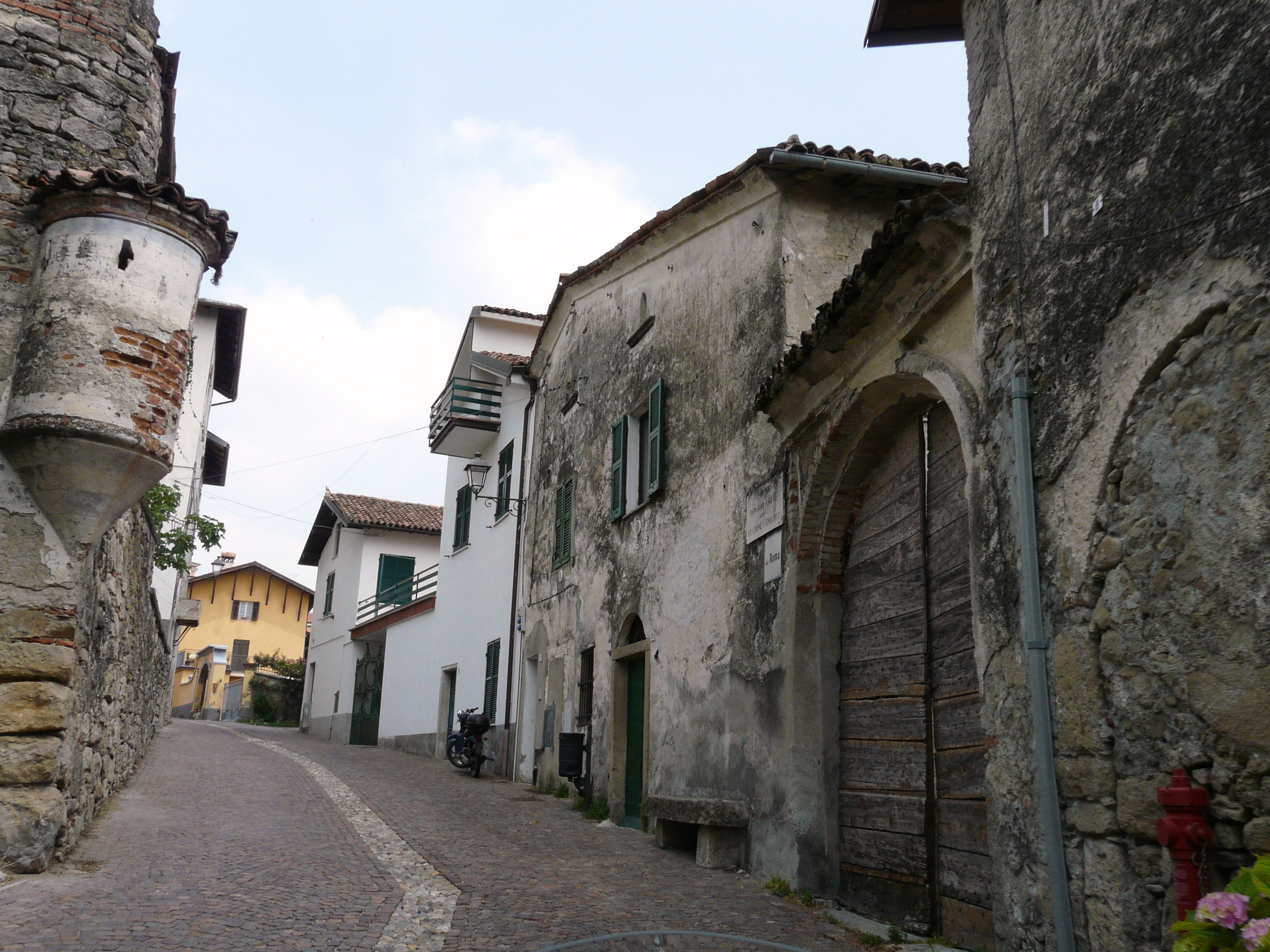

- Coat of arms

- Location within Italy Location within Piedmont
- Coordinates: 44°40′15″N 08°45′35″E
- Country: Italy
- Region: Piedmont
- Province: Alessandria (AL)
- Frazioni: Cadepiaggio, Ca di Massa, Cadegualchi, Tramontana, Tramontanino

Area
  - Total: 12.5 km^{2} (4.8 sq mi)
- Elevation: 330 m (1,080 ft)

Population (31 December 2004)
  - Total: 721
  - Density: 57.7/km^{2} (149/sq mi)
- Demonym: Parodesi
- Time zone: UTC+1 (CET)
  - Summer (DST): UTC+2 (CEST)
- Postal code: 15060
- Dialing code: 0143

Parodi Ligure is a comune in the province of Alessandria, part of Piedmont, in northwest Italy.

== History ==
Evidence of the existence of the Parodi Ligure region goes back as early as 937 when it was identified as "Palode". It was later assigned to the Castiglione monastery. The town was fortified around 1128 (Castrum Palodii). It was sold to the Republic of Genoa after the Genoese liberated the Marquis of Parodi, Alberto 'Zueta', who had been held hostage by the Lord of Castelletto. From this time on, it was under the control of Genoa, although Alberto's son, William, nicknamed 'the Saracen', unsuccessfully attempted to regain it with the support of his maternal uncle, William V of Montferrat. In 1945, some damage was caused to the region and some houses were burnt as a result of the Nazi/Fascist confrontation (this region of Italy is famous for being anti-fascist).
