= Tassarolo =

- Comune
- Comune di Tassarolo
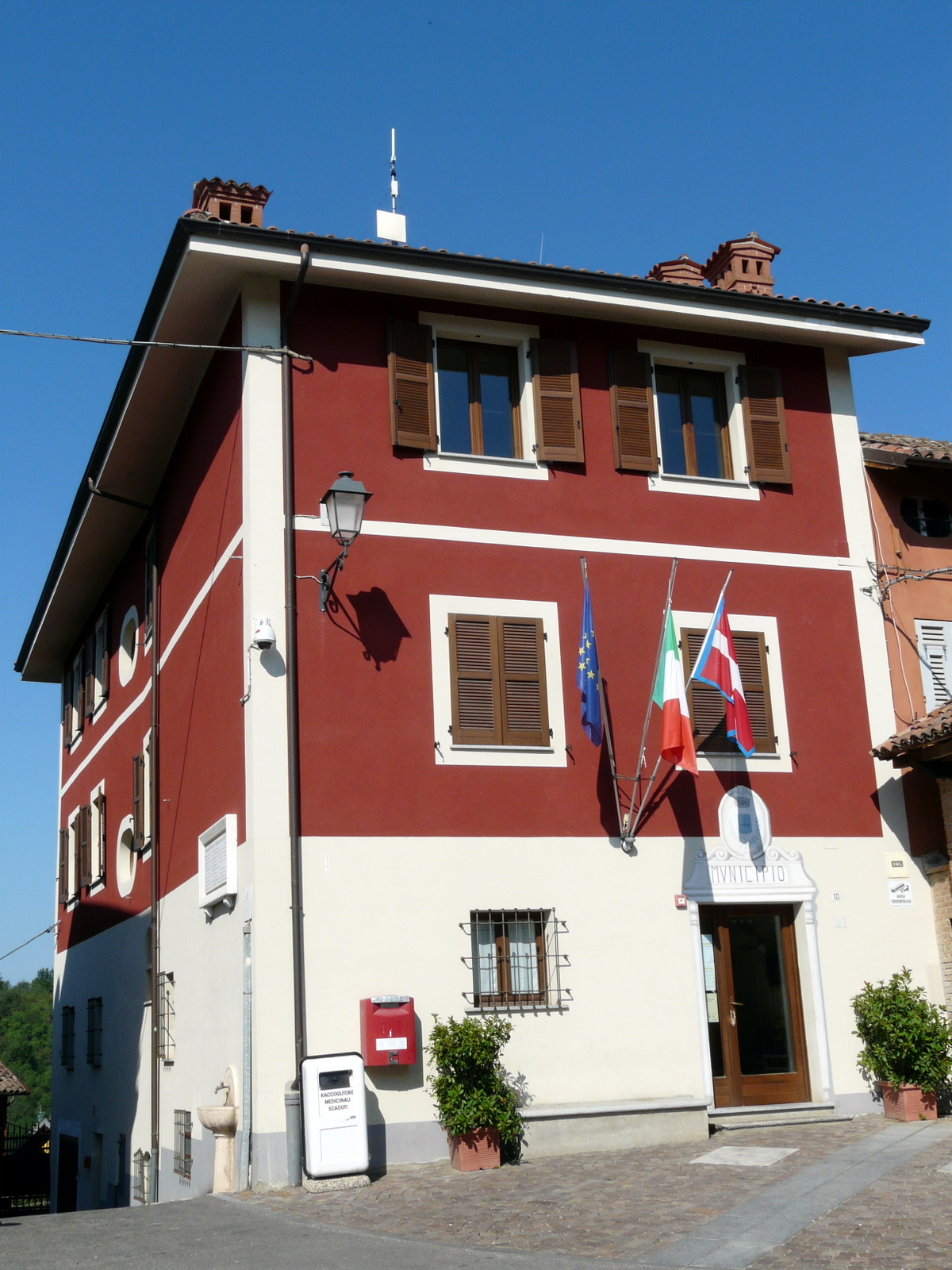

- Location within Italy Location within Piedmont
- Coordinates: 44°43′N 8°46′E
- Country: Italy
- Region: Piedmont
- Province: Province of Alessandria (AL)

Government
  - Mayor: Giuseppe Luigi Cavriani

Area
  - Total: 7.1 km^{2} (2.7 sq mi)
- Elevation: 250 m (820 ft)

Population (Dec. 2004)
  - Total: 598
  - Density: 84/km^{2} (220/sq mi)
- Demonym: Tassarolesi
- Time zone: UTC+1 (CET)
  - Summer (DST): UTC+2 (CEST)
- Postal code: 15060
- Dialing code: 0143
- Patron saint: San Rocco
- Saint day: August 16
- Website: Official website

Tassarolo is a comune (municipality) in the Province of Alessandria in the Italian region Piedmont, located about 90 kilometres (56 mi) southeast of Turin and about 25 kilometres (16 mi) southeast of Alessandria. As of 31 December 2004, it had a population of 598 and an area of 7.1 square kilometres (2.7 mi^{2}).

Tassarolo borders the following municipalities: Francavilla Bisio, Gavi, Novi Ligure, and Pasturana.

== Demographic evolution ==
Historical population

Year	Pop.	±%
1861	757	—
1871	794	+4.9%
1881	824	+3.8%
1901	880	+6.8%
1911	904	+2.7%

Year	Pop.	±%
1921	880	−2.7%
1931	815	−7.4%
1936	796	−2.3%
1951	678	−14.8%
1961	557	−17.8%

Year	Pop.	±%
1971	480	−13.8%
1981	514	+7.1%
1991	558	+8.6%
2001	611	+9.5%

Source: Data from ISTAT

== Notable people ==
- Maximilian Spinola (1780–1857), entomologist.
