= Francavilla Bisio =

- Comune
- Comune di Francavilla Bisio
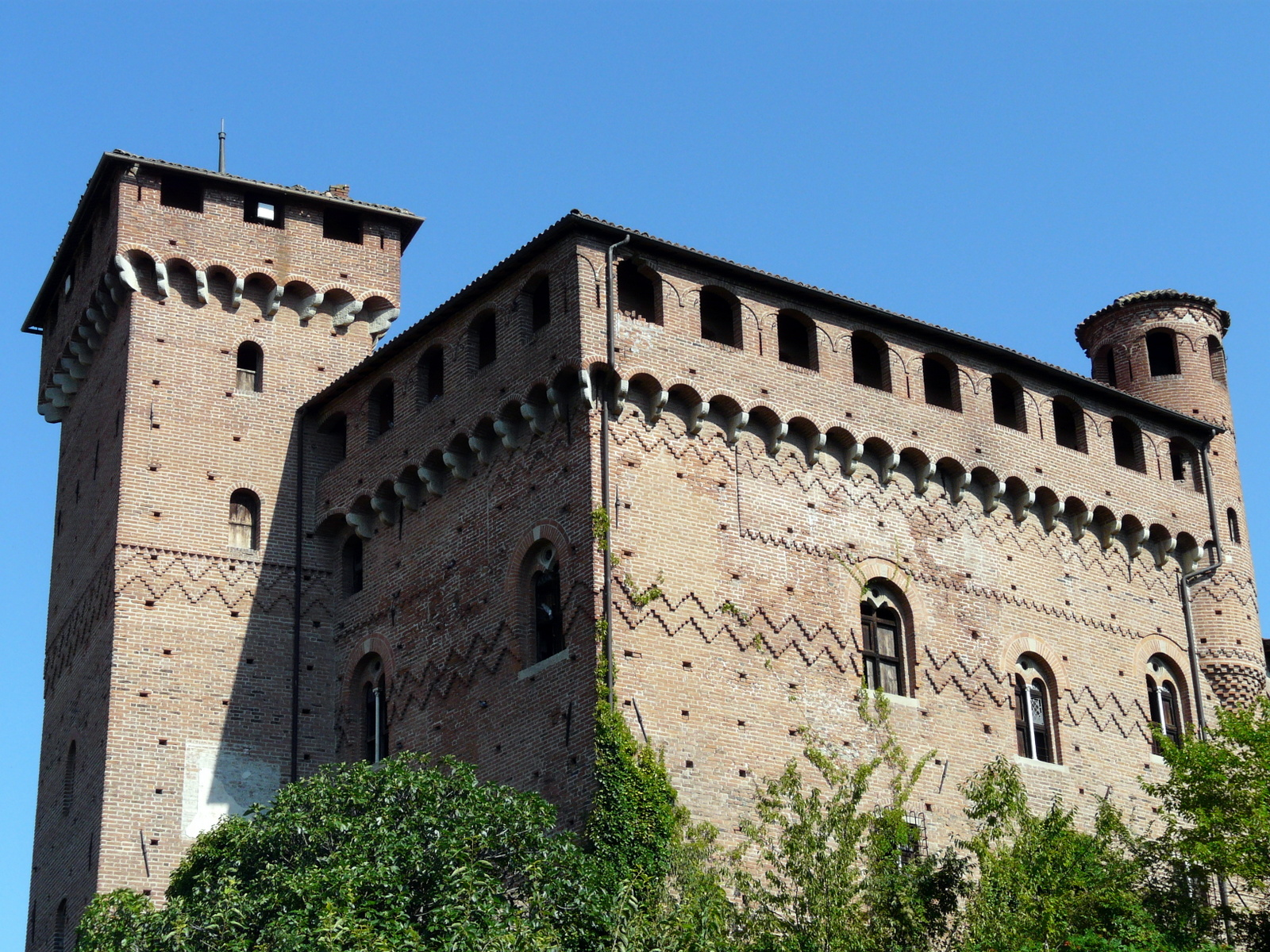

- Coat of arms

- Location within Italy Location within Piedmont
- Coordinates: 44°43′N 8°44′E
- Country: Italy
- Region: Piedmont
- Province: Alessandria (AL)
- Frazioni: Bisio, Cascina della Signora

Government
  - Mayor: Mario Mazzarello

Area
  - Total: 7.8 km^{2} (3.0 sq mi)
- Elevation: 160 m (520 ft)

Population (2005)
  - Total: 448
  - Density: 57/km^{2} (150/sq mi)
- Demonym: Francavillesi
- Time zone: UTC+1 (CET)
  - Summer (DST): UTC+2 (CEST)
- Postal code: 15060
- Dialing code: 0143
- Website: http://www.comune.francavillabisio.al.it/

Francavilla Bisio is a comune (municipality) in the Province of Alessandria in the Italian region Piedmont, located about 90 kilometres (56 mi) southeast of Turin and about 25 kilometres (16 mi) southeast of Alessandria.

Francavilla Bisio borders the following municipalities: Basaluzzo, Capriata d'Orba, Gavi, Pasturana, San Cristoforo, and Tassarolo.
