= Pasturana =

- Comune
- Comune di Pasturana
- Location within Italy Location within Piedmont
- Coordinates: 44°46′N 8°41′E
- Country: Italy
- Region: Piedmont
- Province: Province of Alessandria (AL)

Area
  - Total: 5.3 km^{2} (2.0 sq mi)
- Elevation: 214 m (702 ft)

Population (Dec. 2004)
  - Total: 1,086
  - Density: 200/km^{2} (530/sq mi)
- Demonym: Pasturanesi
- Time zone: UTC+1 (CET)
  - Summer (DST): UTC+2 (CEST)
- Postal code: 15060
- Dialing code: 0143
- Website: Official website

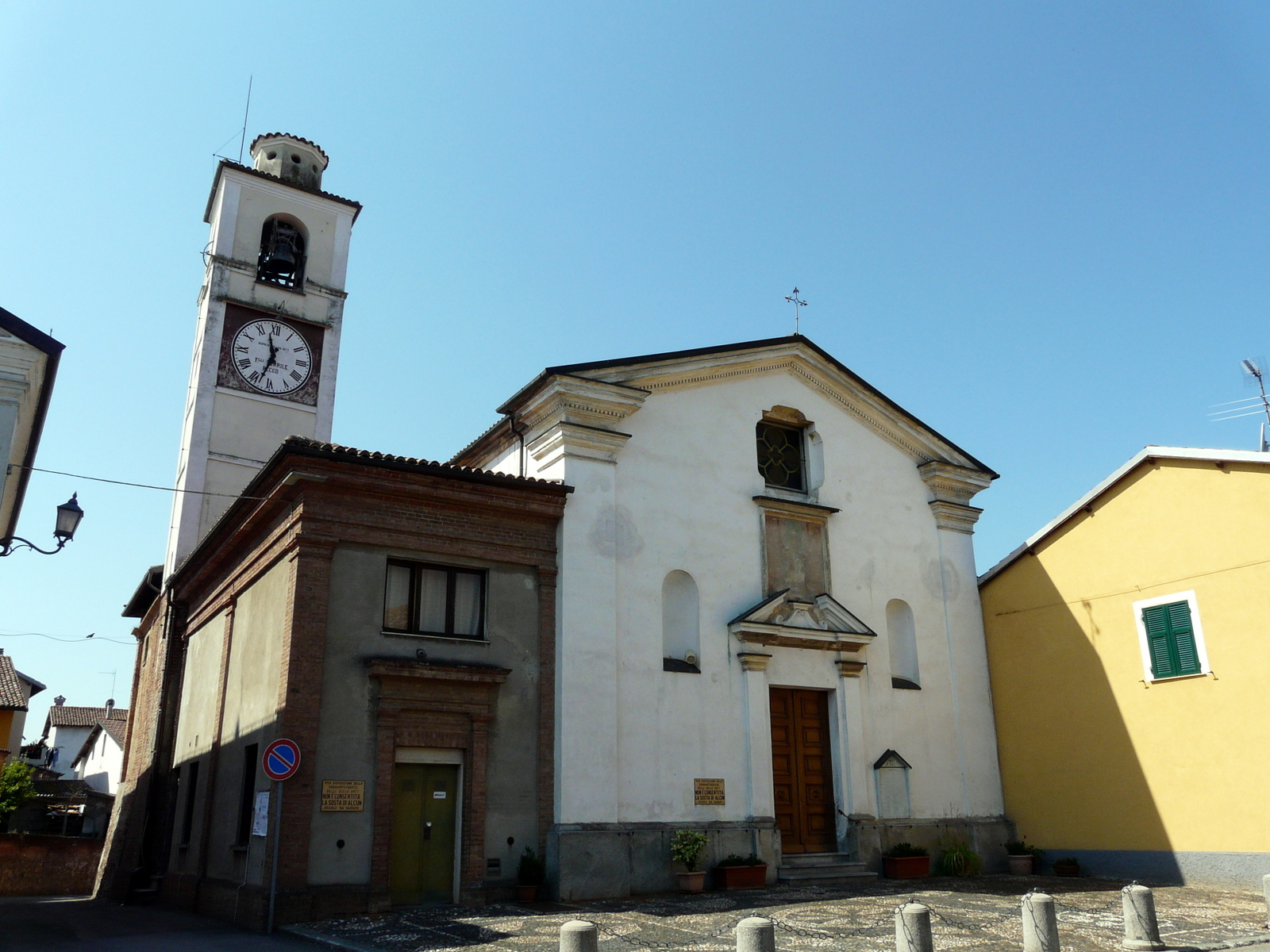
The Church of San Martino, Pasturana, Piedmont, Italy

Pasturana is a comune (municipality) in the Province of Alessandria in the Italian region Piedmont, located about 80 kilometres (50 mi) southeast of Turin and about 15 kilometres (9 mi) southeast of Alessandria. As of 31 December 2004, it had a population of 1,086 and an area of 5.3 square kilometres (2.0 mi^{2}).

Pasturana borders the following municipalities: Basaluzzo, Francavilla Bisio, Novi Ligure, and Tassarolo.

== Demographic evolution ==
Historical population

Year	Pop.	±%
1861	559	—
1871	547	−2.1%
1881	642	+17.4%
1901	779	+21.3%
1911	817	+4.9%

Year	Pop.	±%
1921	824	+0.9%
1931	820	−0.5%
1936	806	−1.7%
1951	784	−2.7%
1961	742	−5.4%

Year	Pop.	±%
1971	639	−13.9%
1981	664	+3.9%
1991	882	+32.8%
2001	1,011	+14.6%

Source: Data from ISTAT
