= Voltaggio =

Voltaggio Ottaggio (Ligurian)
- Comune
- Comune di Voltaggio
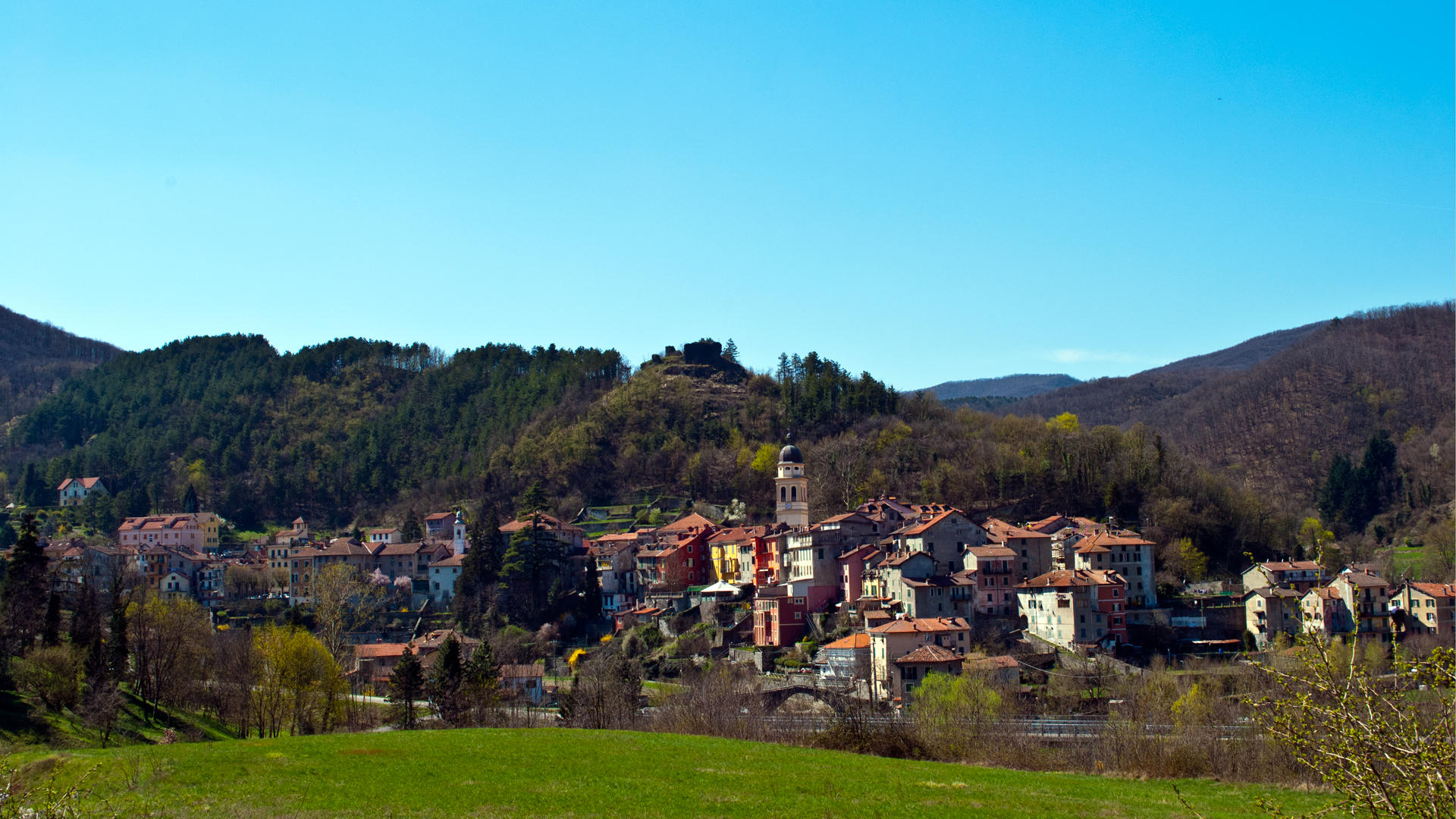

- Coat of arms

- Location within Italy Location within Piedmont
- Coordinates: 44°37′N 8°51′E
- Country: Italy
- Region: Piedmont
- Province: Alessandria (AL)
- Frazioni: Molini di Voltaggio

Government
  - Mayor: Giuseppe Benasso

Area
  - Total: 51.3 km^{2} (19.8 sq mi)
- Elevation: 342 m (1,122 ft)

Population (31 December 2006)
  - Total: 761
  - Density: 14.8/km^{2} (38.4/sq mi)
- Demonym: Voltaggini
- Time zone: UTC+1 (CET)
  - Summer (DST): UTC+2 (CEST)
- Postal code: 15060
- Dialing code: 010
- Patron saint: St. Giovanni Battista de Rossi
- Saint day: 24 June

Voltaggio (Ottaggio in Ligurian) is a comune (municipality) in the Province of Alessandria in the Italian region Piedmont, located about 100 kilometres (62 mi) southeast of Turin and about 40 kilometres (25 mi) southeast of Alessandria.

Located there is a Roman bridge on the Lemme stream.

== See also ==
- Parco naturale delle Capanne di Marcarolo
