= Rocca Grimalda =

- Comune
- Comune di Rocca Grimalda
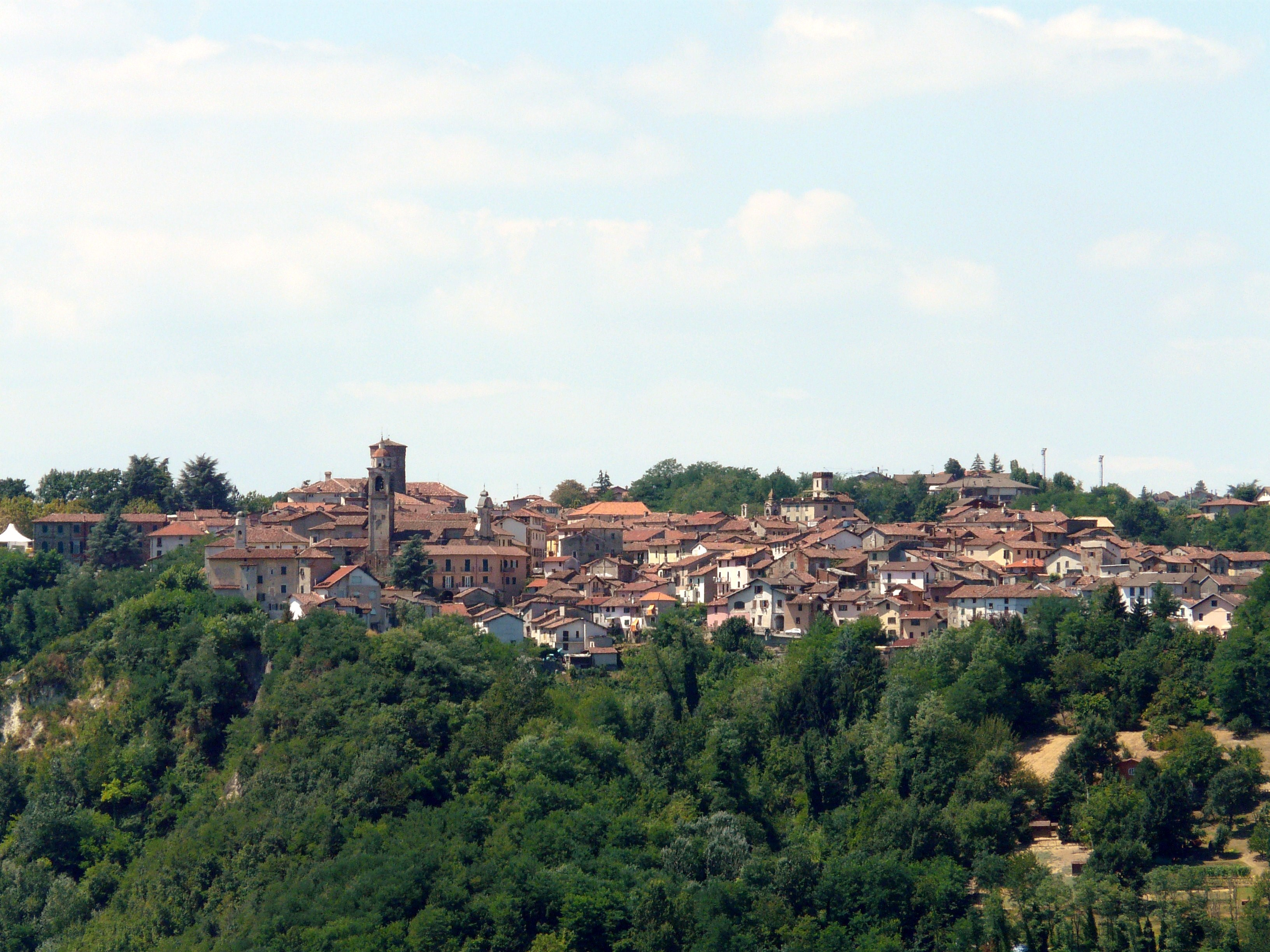

- Location within Italy Location within Piedmont
- Coordinates: 44°40′21″N 8°38′58″E
- Country: Italy
- Region: Piedmont
- Province: Province of Alessandria (AL)
- Frazioni: San Giacomo

Government
  - Mayor: Giancarlo Subbrero

Area
  - Total: 15.64 km^{2} (6.04 sq mi)
- Elevation: 280 m (920 ft)

Population (31 December 2010)
  - Total: 1,548
  - Density: 98.98/km^{2} (256.3/sq mi)
- Demonym: Rocchesi
- Time zone: UTC+1 (CET)
  - Summer (DST): UTC+2 (CEST)
- Postal code: 15078
- Dialing code: 0143
- Patron saint: James, son of Zebedee
- Saint day: 25 July
- Website: Official website

Rocca Grimalda (Ra Roca in dialect) is a village and comune in the province of Alessandria, Piedmont, Northern Italy. It lies in Upper Montferrat, a historical region of Piedmont, and it was built upon a rocky hill on the Orba's left bank, very close to Ovada. The nearest airport is the Cristoforo Colombo Airport in Genoa.

== History ==
Across antiquity, the area was occupied by the Ligures then Romans. The town was first built in the plain under a hill to extract gold from the sands by the river. Old documents report this centre, called Rondinaria, was a small, wealthy town in the middle of thick forests and had likely some sort of defence structure, probably on Rocca Grimalda's hill.

In the plain an old necropolis was found in the 1980s but on the other side of the village’s land another high rocky hill was found to have been shaped as some sort of castle with a deep ditch and high palisades, probably from the Lombard rule era: the same place, called “Trionzo”, was linked with old legends of witches, dances and evil spirits.

The village’s existence is first recorded in 900, and in the following years Rocca Grimalda was possessed by various landlords. From the early 17th to the 18th century, travellers were often robbed in the forests around the village by bandit families. In the 18th century the forests were replaced with vineyards, with only some forests remaining as parks of mansions. In 1736 Rocca Grimalda became part of the Kingdom of Sardinia.

Many young men from the village fought in World War II, with some fighting locally against the occupying Fascists and the Germans. After the war many inhabitants moved to larger cities like Genoa, Milan, Turin and many others in other countries and continents.

== Main sights ==
Rocca Grimalda has kept its medieval structure, following the shape of the rocky hill upon which it was built. The names of some parts of the village remind of its old defence role: "Bastioni" (the bastions) "Torricella" (little tower), "Castelvero" (old castle), "Porta" (the gate) and others. The village has still only one gate, right under the Castle.

The Castle was built in the 13th century as a military stronghold, but it was turned into a noble palace five centuries later: it has a medieval part but the rest are alao Renaissance and 19th century-style rooms. There is a high circular tower which was used as prisons for long times: its walls have still drawings and signatures by prisoners of the 17th and 18th centuries.

The Parish Church, San Giacomo Maggiore, a building of Romanesque origin in the centre of the village, is decorated with paintings about St. John Bapt's life. This saint was then replaced by St. James in the villagers' devotion: St. James was a very popular saint in the area because a pilgrimage road to Santiago de Compostela in Spain passed right through these lands.

Two minor churches of the 17th and 18th centuries are dedicated to the Lady and the other to St. James Bapt.: they have very old wooden statues which are carried through the little roads of the village once a year as a sign of popular devotion.

The oldest church in Rocca Grimalda is St. Limbania, built on the ruins of an old castle, in the lower part of the village: the church is dedicated to Mary's Assumption but it is popularly known as St. Limbania. Inside there are frescos of the 15th century but other parts of the building were added later on, when the church turned into some sort of sanctuary for the muleteers who used to carry goods from the sea to the plains and back, through the mountains. They used to start their journey from a church dedicated to St. Limbania near the sea, in Genoa-Voltri, and they stopped in Rocca Grimalda's church, in order to be sure of St.Limbania's protection through the dangerous journey through the mountains.

== Culture ==
The dance of “Lachera” is performed every year during Carnival time, with features of foundation and propitiatory spring rite.

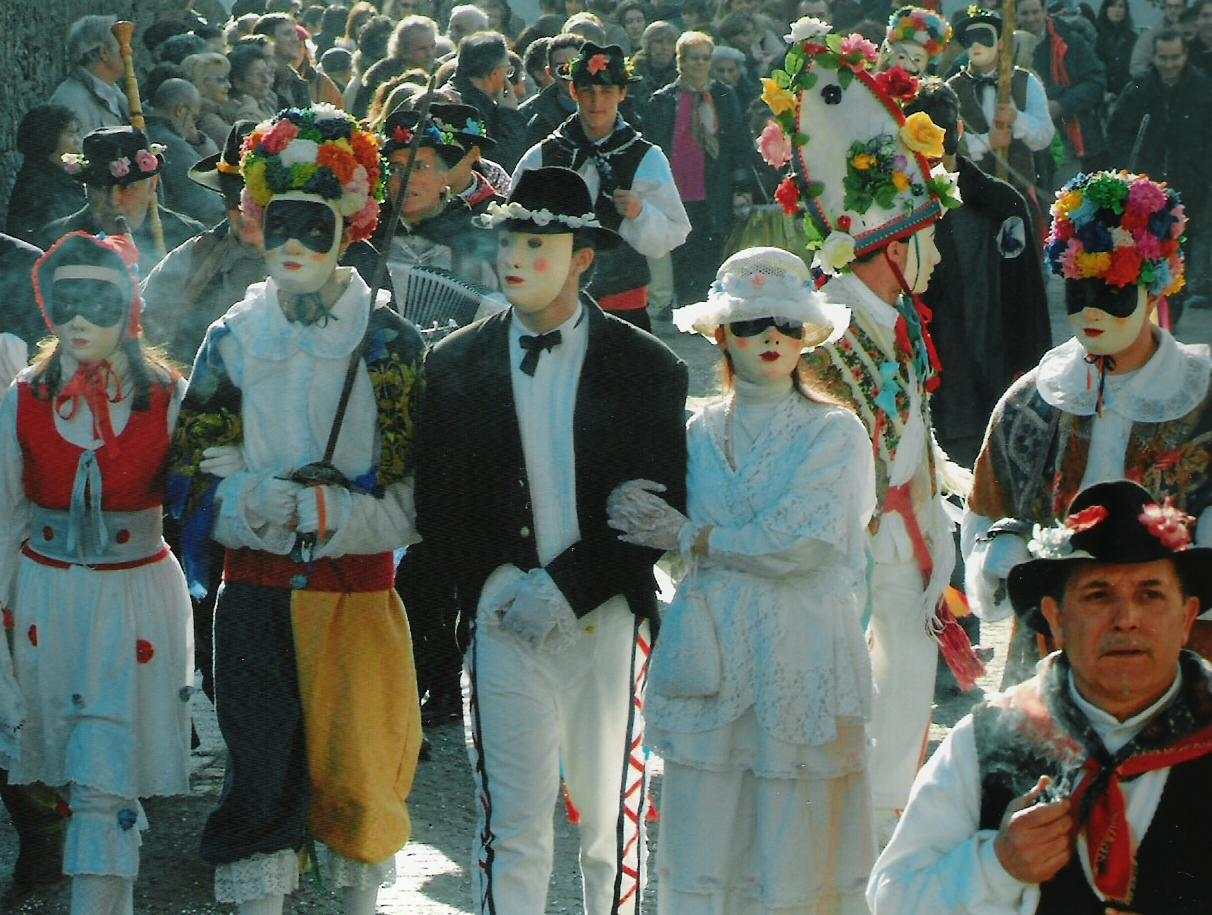
Lachera, main group during the wedding train.

Lachera is performed in carnival time in its most complete form, with a wedding train through the countryside and five day of dances, songs, wine and food, until it reaches the village and the rite itself is completely performed. Lachera is often exported in other regions and countries, like Belgium, Austria, France, Germany.

Peirbuieira is a recipe served every year the last week of August in a festival.
