= Cuccaro Monferrato =

- Comune
- Comune di Cuccaro Monferrato
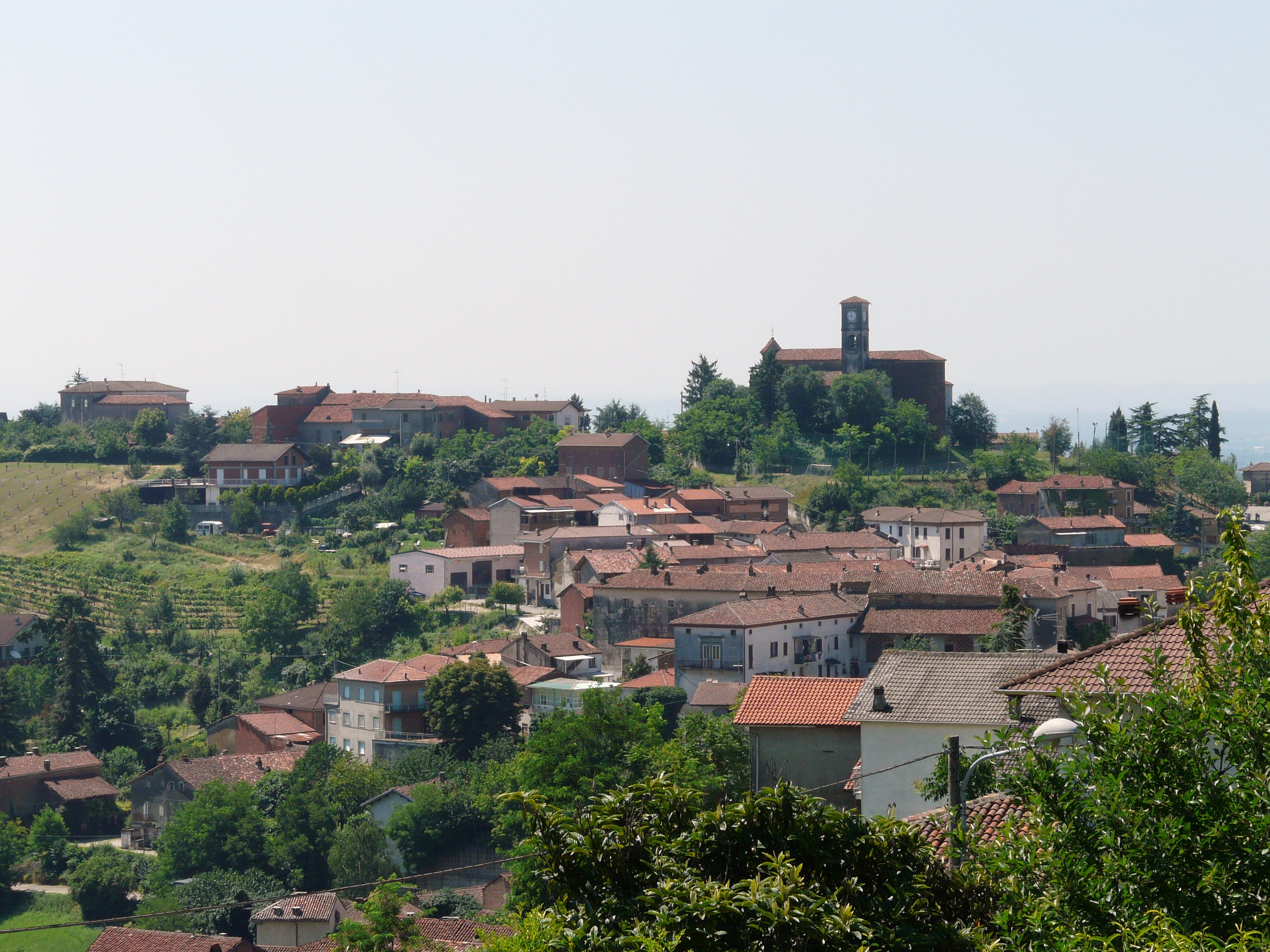

- Coat of arms

- Location within Italy Location within Piedmont
- Coordinates: 44°59′N 8°27′E
- Country: Italy
- Region: Piedmont
- Province: Alessandria (AL)

Government
  - Mayor: Fabio Bellinaso

Area
  - Total: 5.3 km^{2} (2.0 sq mi)

Population (2005)
  - Total: 362
  - Density: 68/km^{2} (180/sq mi)
- Demonym: Cuccaresi
- Time zone: UTC+1 (CET)
  - Summer (DST): UTC+2 (CEST)
- Postal code: 15040
- Dialing code: 0131

Cuccaro Monferrato (Cucri in Piemontese) is a comune (municipality) in the Province of Alessandria in the Italian region Piedmont, located about 60 kilometres (37 mi) east of Turin and about 15 kilometres (9 mi) northwest of Alessandria.

Cuccaro Monferrato borders the following municipalities: Camagna Monferrato, Fubine, Lu, Quargnento, and Vignale Monferrato.

The Swedish former footballer Nils Liedholm resided there and ran a vineyard, and his son Carlo runs it today.
