= Amatore =

Amatore is a surname. Notable people with the surname include:

- Christian Amatore (born 1951), French chemist and a member of the French Academy of Sciences
- Gennaro Amatore (born 1998), know professionally as Samurai Jay, Italian rapper and singer-songwriter
- Michele Amatore (c. 1826–1883), Sudanese ex-slave who became a captain in the Bersaglieri of the Italian army

== See also ==
- Amadori
- Amatores
- Amatori
- Kategoria Amatore I
