= Ozzano =

Ozzano may refer to two places in Italy:

- Ozzano dell'Emilia, a town and municipality in the Province of Bologna, Emilia-Romagna
- Ozzano Monferrato, a village and municipality in the Province of Alessandria, Piedmont, Italy
