= Amadori =

Amadori is a surname. Notable people with the name include:

- Davide Amadori (born 1992), Italian footballer
- Federico Cattani Amadori (1856–1943), Italian Cardinal of the Roman Catholic Church
- Luis César Amadori (1902–1977), Italian-Argentine film director and screenwriter
- Marino Amadori (born 1957), Italian cyclist

== See also ==
- Amadori rearrangement, is an organic reaction
- Amedori, surname
- Amatore, surname
