= Amatori =

Amatori may refer to:

- Franco Amatori, professor of economic history at Bocconi University, Milan, Italy
- Amatori Alghero, Italian rugby union team based in Alghero, Sardinia
- Amatori Catania, Italian rugby union club based in Catania, Sicily
- Amatori Rugby Milano, Italian rugby union team based in Milan, Lombardy
- Amatori Wasken Lodi, roller hockey team from Lodi, Lombardy

== See also ==
- Amadori
- Amatores
- Amatore
