= Montemagno Monferrato Castle =

Castle in Piedmont, Italy

- Castello di Montemagno Monferrato
- Montemagno Monferrato, Piedmont, Italy
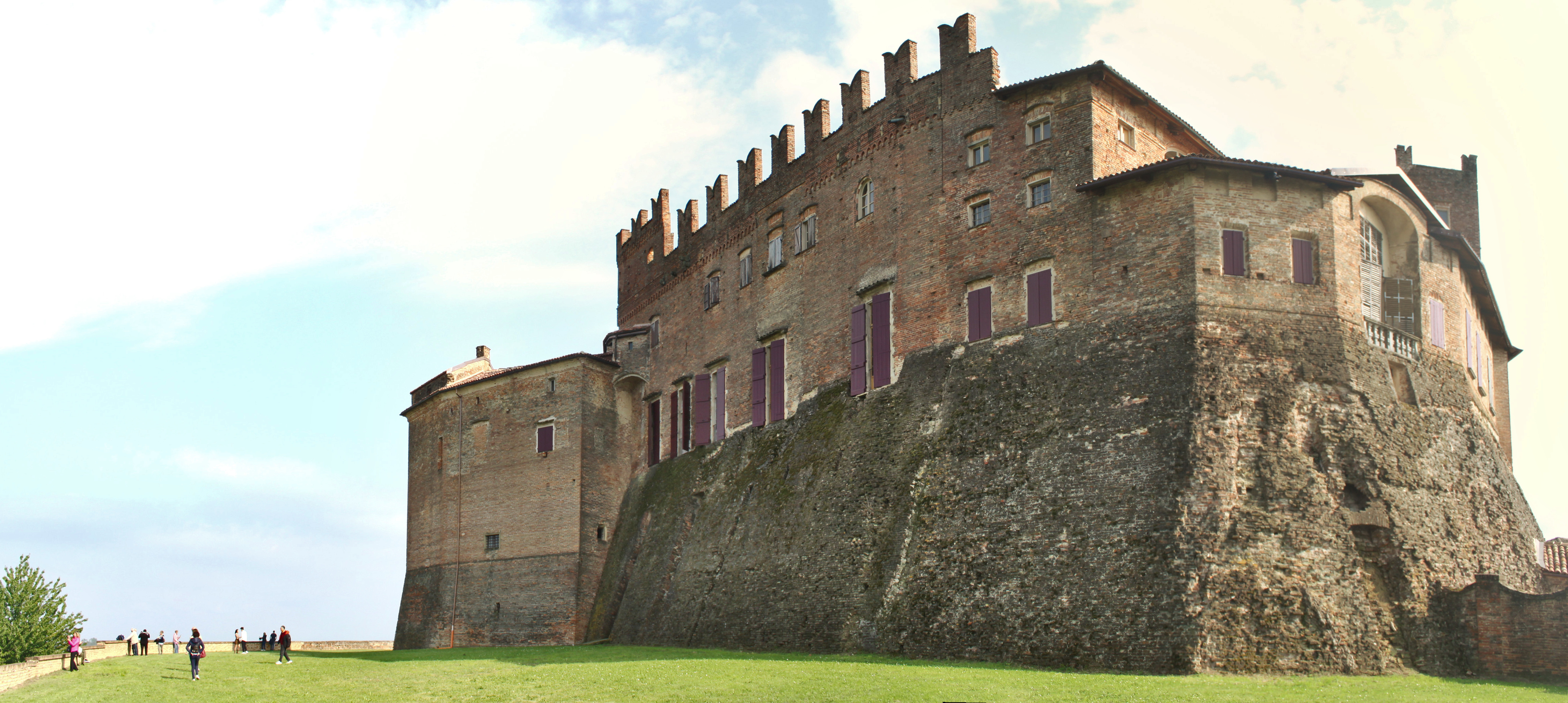
- Montemagno Monferrato Castle in 2023

Site information
- Type: Castle

Location
- Coordinates: 44°59′03.07″N 8°19′29.79″E

Montemagno Monferrato Castle (Italian: Castello di Montemagno Monferrato) is a castle located in Montemagno Monferrato, Piedmont, Italy.

== History ==
The earliest documents attesting to the existence of the castle date back to 981. Originally, the castle consisted only of a keep surrounded by a wall and a moat.

Over the following centuries, the structure was progressively expanded; in the meantime, the lords of Montemagno Monferrato saw their importance grow, thanks in part to an alliance with nearby city of Asti. However, the wars between Asti and the March of Montferrat caused severe damage to the castle in 1269 and its partial destruction in 1290.

The castle was therefore rebuilt at the beginning of the 14th century, while in the following century the lords of Montemagno Monferrato swore allegiance to the Dukes of Savoy.

In the 16th century, following the annexation of Montferrat to the Duchy of Mantua, the castle passed through the hands of many different families, from the Della Cerda to the Ardizzi, the Callori, the Griselli, the Sanseverino, and the Cavalchini, until it eventually came into the possession of the Counts Calvi of Bergolo, who still own it today.

== Description ==
The castle stands in a commanding position at the top of the hill on which the village of Montemagno Monferrato lies. It has an irregular layout. Its pointed-arch windows, decorated with polychrome frames in alternating brick and tuff following the Asti tradition, were opened during the reconstruction work of the 14th century, together with the addition of the richly adorned belt course. The large rectangular windows, balconies, and the elliptical courtyard instead date to 18th-century building campaigns. Access to the castle is via a drawbridge that crosses the moat surrounding it.
