= Rosignano =

Rosignano is the name of a number of places in Italy:

- Rosignano Marittimo, a commune of the Province of Livorno in Tuscany.
  - Rosignano Solvay, a frazione of Rosignano Marittimo
  - Rosignano Airfield an abandoned World War II military airfield near Rosignano Marittimo
- Rosignano Monferrato, a commune of the Province of Alessandria in Piedmont.
