= Cuccaro =

Cuccaro may refer to these Italian municipalities:

- Lu e Cuccaro Monferrato, in the province of Alessandria, Piedmont
- Cuccaro Vetere, in the province of Salerno, Campania
