= Treville, Piedmont =

Treville
- Comune
- Comune di Treville
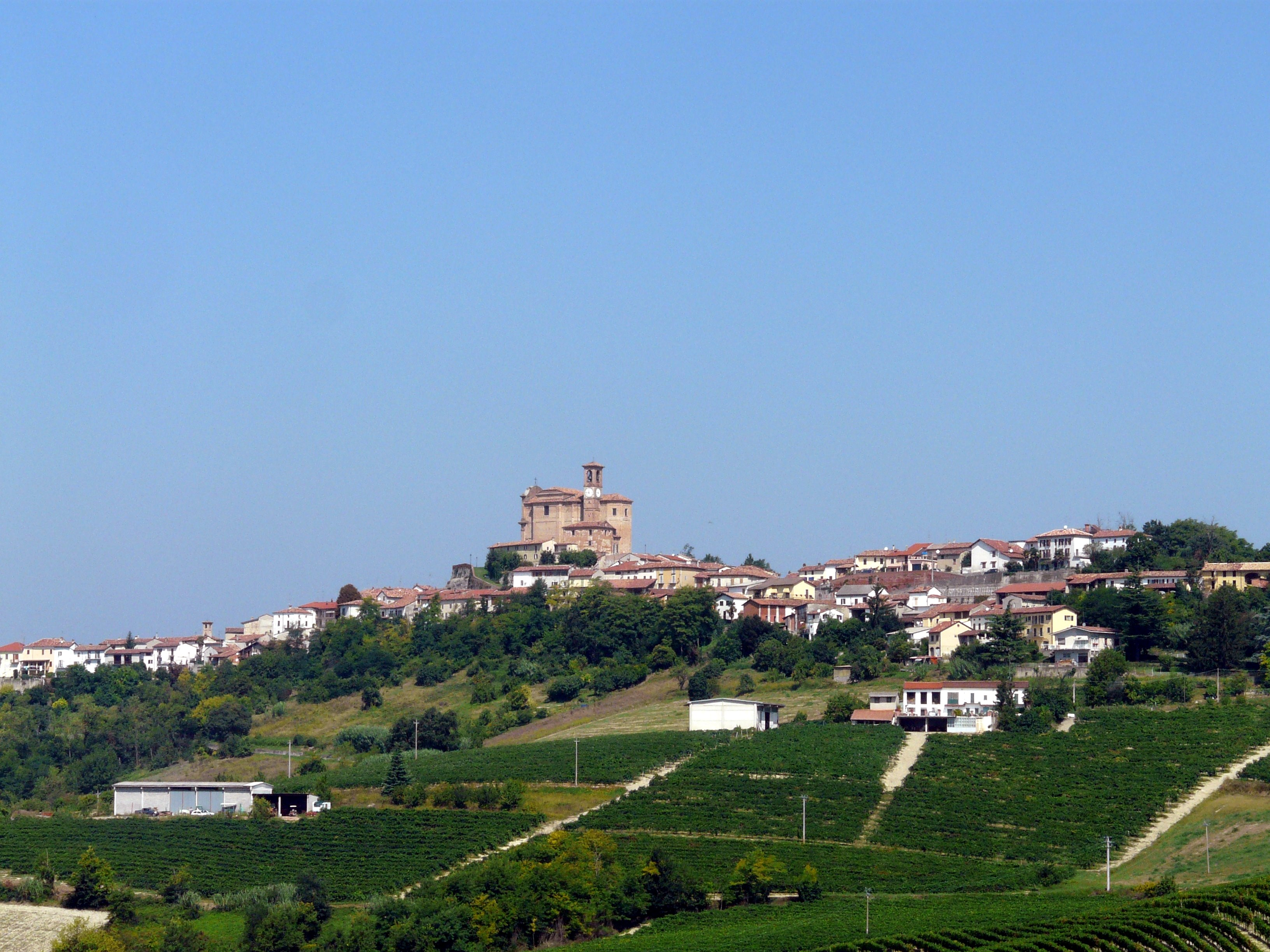

- Location within Italy Location within Piedmont
- Coordinates: 45°6′N 8°22′E
- Country: Italy
- Region: Piedmont
- Province: Province of Alessandria (AL)

Area
  - Total: 4.7 km^{2} (1.8 sq mi)
- Elevation: 300 m (980 ft)

Population (Dec. 2004)
  - Total: 267
  - Density: 57/km^{2} (150/sq mi)
- Time zone: UTC+1 (CET)
  - Summer (DST): UTC+2 (CEST)
- Postal code: 15030
- Dialing code: 0142

Treville is a comune (municipality) in the Province of Alessandria in the Italian region Piedmont, located about 50 kilometres (31 mi) east of Turin and about 30 kilometres (19 mi) northwest of Alessandria. As of 31 December 2004, it had a population of 267 and an area of 4.7 square kilometres (1.8 mi^{2}).

Treville borders the following municipalities: Cereseto, Ozzano Monferrato, and Sala Monferrato.

== Demographic evolution ==
Historical population

Year	Pop.	±%
1861	814	—
1871	828	+1.7%
1881	881	+6.4%
1901	839	−4.8%
1911	932	+11.1%

Year	Pop.	±%
1921	839	−10.0%
1931	742	−11.6%
1936	682	−8.1%
1951	602	−11.7%
1961	452	−24.9%

Year	Pop.	±%
1971	355	−21.5%
1981	335	−5.6%
1991	296	−11.6%
2001	280	−5.4%

Source: Data from ISTAT
