= Camagna Monferrato =

Commune in Piedmont, Italy

- Comune
- Comune di Camagna Monferrato
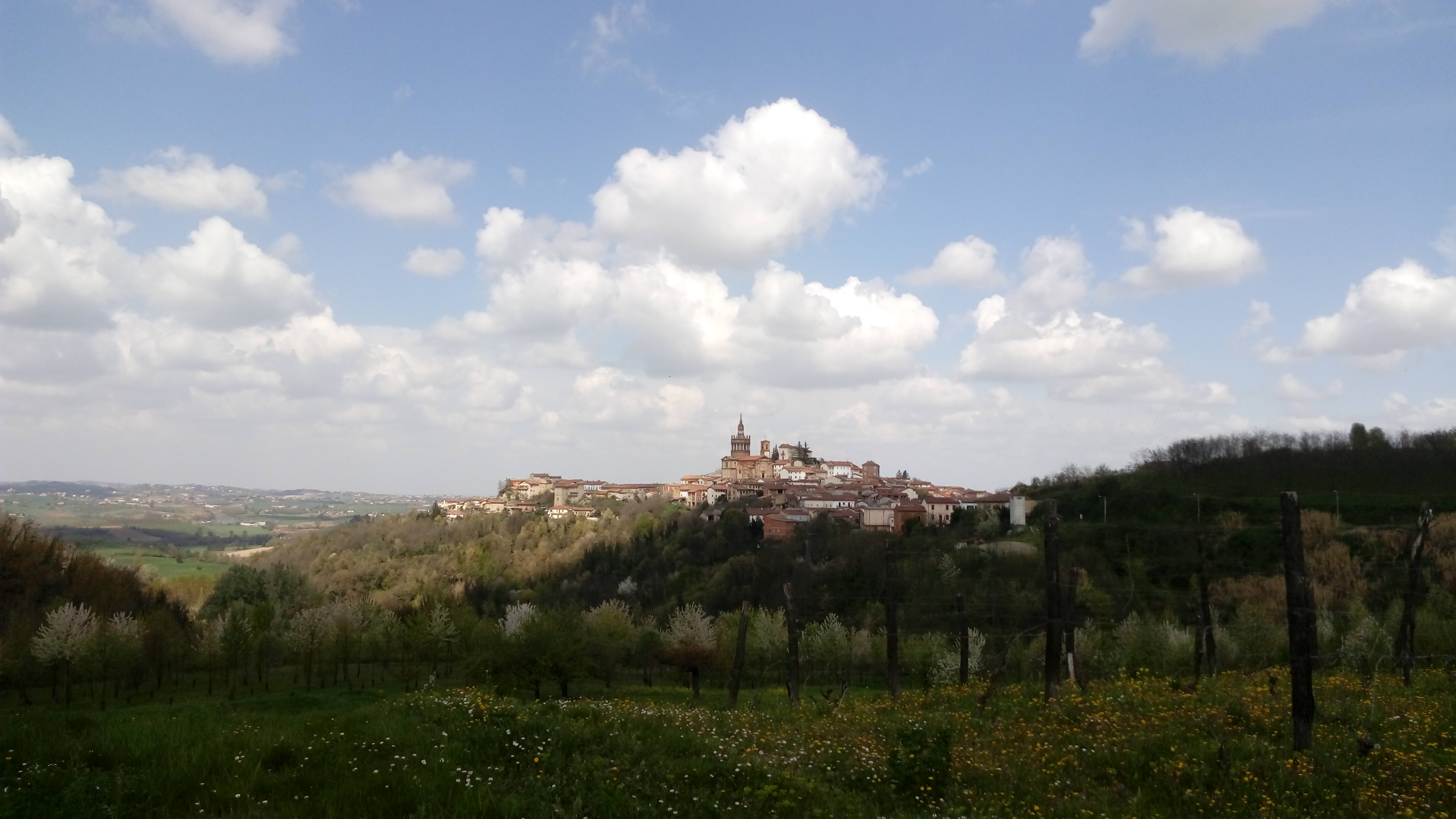
- View of Camagna Monferrato

- Location within Italy Location within Piedmont
- Coordinates: 45°1′N 8°26′E
- Country: Italy
- Region: Piedmont
- Province: Alessandria (AL)
- Frazioni: Regione Bonina, Stramba

Government
  - Mayor: Claudio Scagliotti

Area
  - Total: 9.25 km^{2} (3.57 sq mi)
- Elevation: 261 m (856 ft)

Population (30 April 2017)
  - Total: 519
  - Density: 56.1/km^{2} (145/sq mi)
- Demonym: Camagnesi
- Time zone: UTC+1 (CET)
  - Summer (DST): UTC+2 (CEST)
- Postal code: 15030
- Dialing code: 0142
- Website: Official website

Camagna Monferrato is a comune (municipality) in the Province of Alessandria in the Italian region Piedmont, located about 60 kilometres (37 mi) east of Turin and about 20 kilometres (12 mi) northwest of Alessandria.

Camagna Monferrato borders the following municipalities: Casale Monferrato, Conzano, Frassinello Monferrato, Lu e Cuccaro Monferrato, Rosignano Monferrato, and Vignale Monferrato.
