= Casorzo Monferrato =

- Comune
- Comune di Casorzo Monferrato
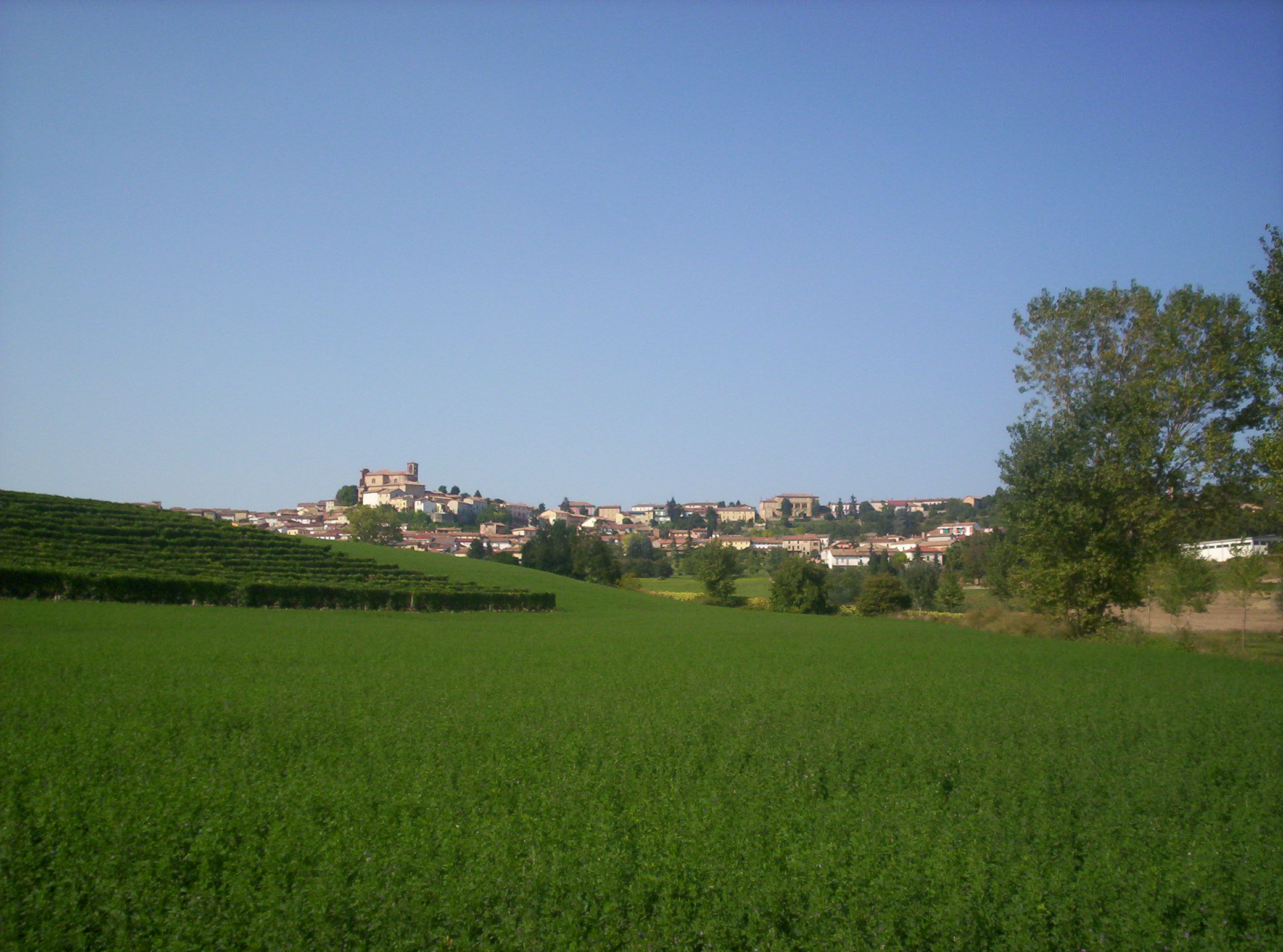
- View of Casorzo Monferrato

- Coat of arms

- Location within Italy Location within Piedmont
- Coordinates: 45°1′N 8°20′E
- Country: Italy
- Region: Piedmont
- Province: Asti (AT)

Government
  - Mayor: Ivana Mussa (elected 16 May 2011)

Area
  - Total: 12.6 km^{2} (4.9 sq mi)
- Elevation: 275 m (902 ft)

Population (1 January 2010)
  - Total: 672
  - Density: 53.3/km^{2} (138/sq mi)
- Demonym: Casorzesi
- Time zone: UTC+1 (CET)
  - Summer (DST): UTC+2 (CEST)
- Postal code: 14032
- Dialing code: 0141

Casorzo Monferrato is a comune (municipality) in the Province of Asti in the Italian region Piedmont, located about 50 kilometres (31 mi) east of Turin and about 15 kilometres (9 mi) northeast of Asti.

Casorzo borders the following municipalities: Altavilla Monferrato, Grana, Grazzano Badoglio, Montemagno, Olivola, Ottiglio, and Vignale Monferrato.

Prior to 2022 it was named Casorzo.
