= Altavilla Monferrato =

- Comune
- Comune di Altavilla Monferrato
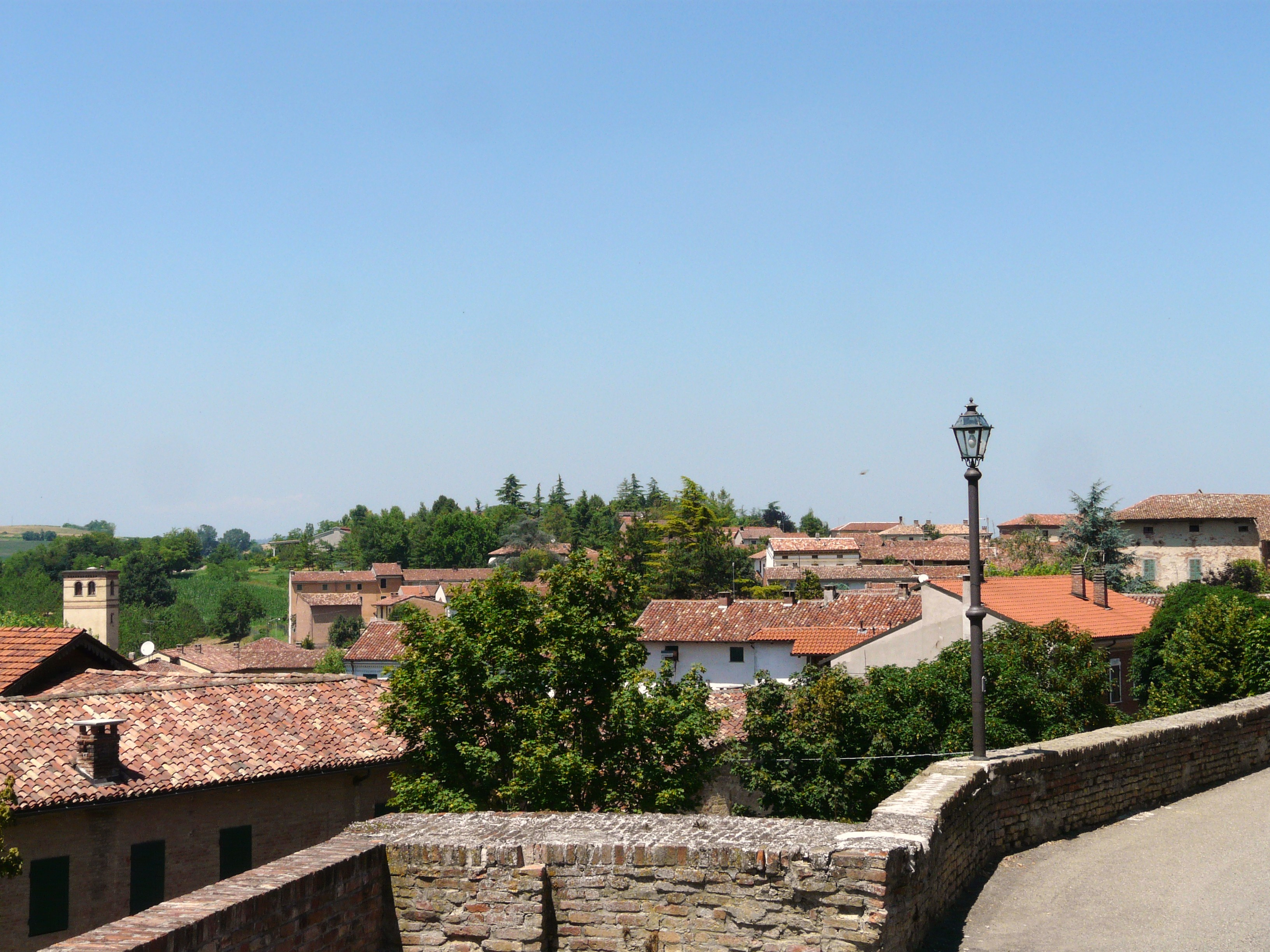
- Panorama from the town hall.

- Coat of arms

- Location of Altavilla Monferrato in Italy Altavilla Monferrato (Piedmont)
- Coordinates: 45°0′N 8°23′E
- Country: Italy
- Region: Piedmont
- Province: Alessandria (AL)

Government
  - Mayor: Pier Giuseppe Fracchia

Area
  - Total: 11.3 km^{2} (4.4 sq mi)
- Elevation: 256 m (840 ft)

Population (31 December 2011)
  - Total: 497
  - Density: 44.0/km^{2} (114/sq mi)
- Demonym: Altavillesi
- Time zone: UTC+1 (CET)
  - Summer (DST): UTC+2 (CEST)
- Postal code: 15041
- Dialing code: 0142
- Patron saint: St. Julius of Novara
- Saint day: 31 January

Altavilla Monferrato is a comune (municipality) in the Province of Alessandria in the Italian region Piedmont, located about 50 kilometres (31 mi) east of Turin and about 20 kilometres (12 mi) northwest of Alessandria.

Altavilla Monferrato borders the following municipalities: Casorzo, Felizzano, Fubine, Montemagno, Viarigi, and Vignale Monferrato. The economy is mostly based on agriculture.
