= Ozzano Monferrato =

- Comune
- Comune di Ozzano Monferrato
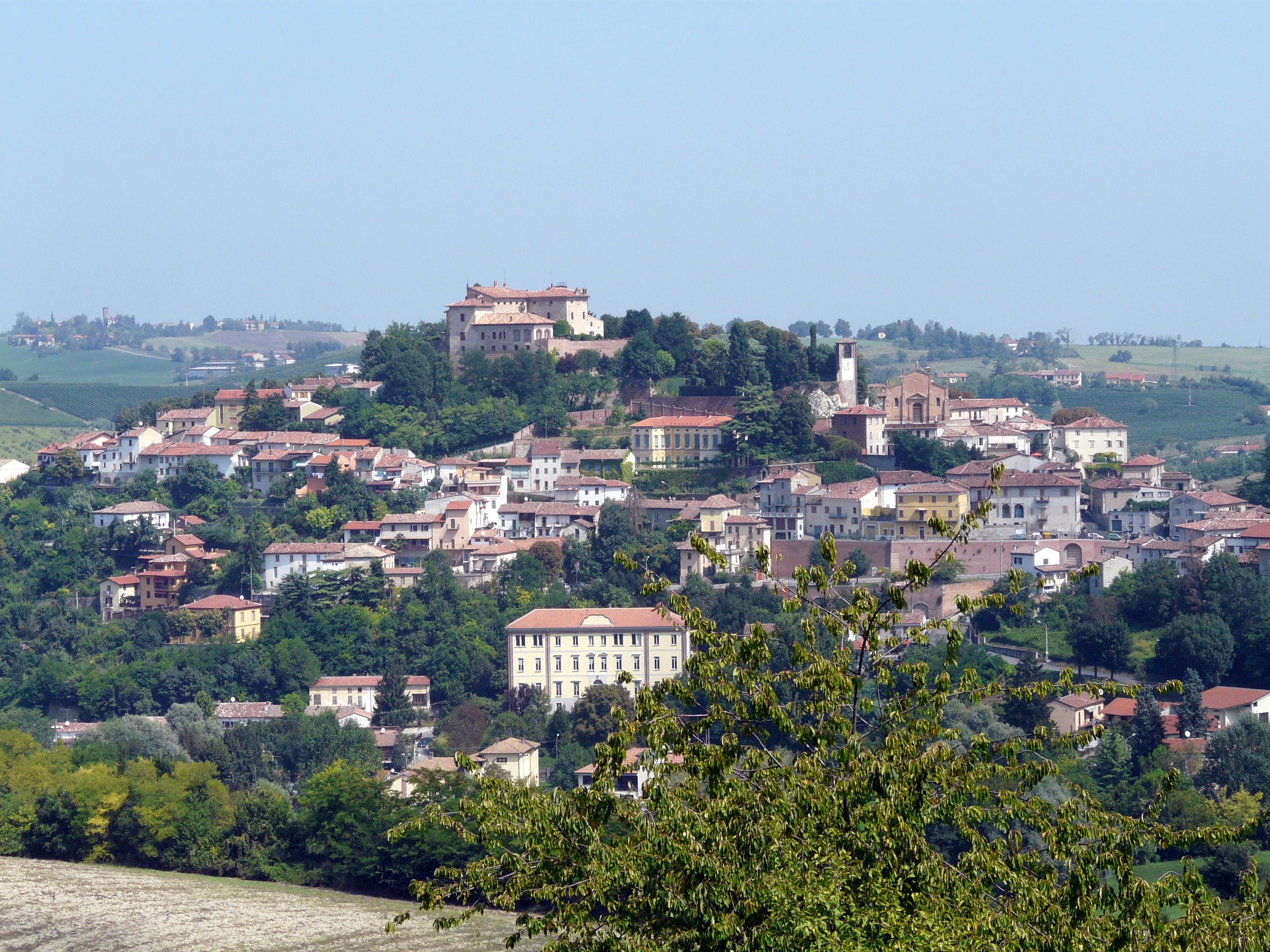

- Location within Italy Location within Piedmont
- Coordinates: 45°06′N 08°22′E
- Country: Italy
- Region: Piedmont
- Province: Alessandria (AL)

Government
  - Mayor: Davide Fabbri

Area
  - Total: 15.2 km^{2} (5.9 sq mi)
- Elevation: 246 m (807 ft)

Population (31 December 2010)
  - Total: 1,501
  - Density: 98.8/km^{2} (256/sq mi)
- Demonym: Ozzanesi
- Time zone: UTC+1 (CET)
  - Summer (DST): UTC+2 (CEST)
- Postal code: 15039
- Dialing code: 0142

Ozzano Monferrato is a comune (municipality) in the Province of Alessandria in the Italian region Piedmont, located about 50 kilometres (31 mi) east of Turin and about 30 kilometres (19 mi) northwest of Alessandria.

Ozzano Monferrato borders the following municipalities: Casale Monferrato, Cella Monte, Cereseto, Pontestura, Rosignano Monferrato, Sala Monferrato, San Giorgio Monferrato, and Treville.

== Main sights ==
- Parish church
- Church of Santa Maria Assunta
- Small church of San Giovanni Battista
- Church of San Salvatore
- Castle
