= Fubine Monferrato =

Fubine Monferrato Fibin-ni (Piedmontese)
- Comune
- Comune di Fubine Monferrato
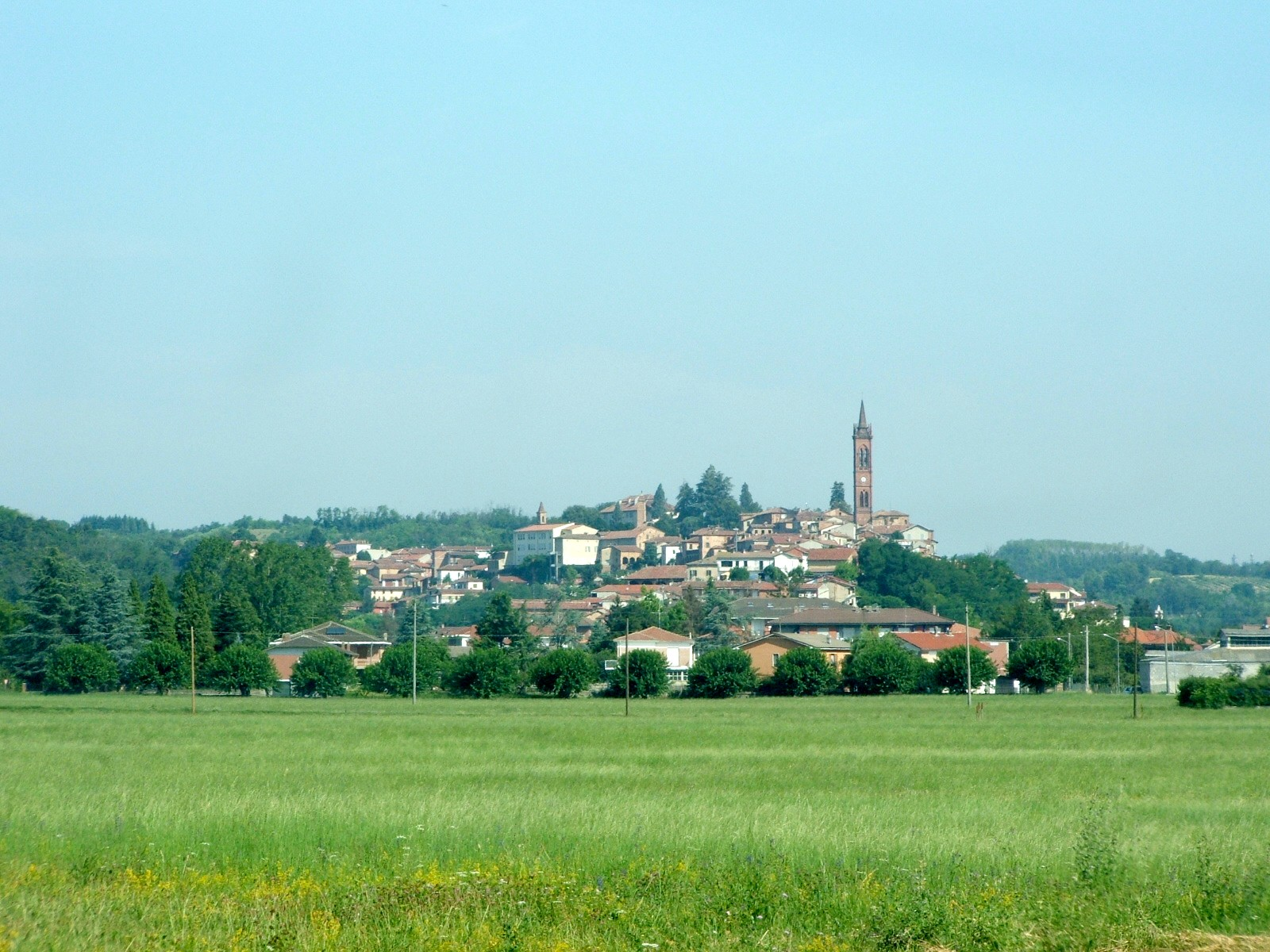

- Coat of arms

- Location within Italy Location within Piedmont
- Coordinates: 44°58′N 8°26′E
- Country: Italy
- Region: Piedmont
- Province: Alessandria (AL)

Government
  - Mayor: Lino Pettazzi

Area
  - Total: 25.53 km^{2} (9.86 sq mi)

Population (31 August 2017)
  - Total: 1,631
  - Density: 63.89/km^{2} (165.5/sq mi)
- Demonym: Fubinesi
- Time zone: UTC+1 (CET)
  - Summer (DST): UTC+2 (CEST)
- Postal code: 15043
- Dialing code: 0131
- Website: Official website

Fubine Monferrato (Montferrat dialect of Piedmontese: Fibin-ni) is a comune (municipality) in the Province of Alessandria in the Italian region of Piedmont, located about 60 kilometres (37 mi) east of Turin and about 15 kilometres (9 mi) northwest of Alessandria.

Fubine Monferrato borders the following municipalities: Altavilla Monferrato, Felizzano, Quargnento, Lu e Cuccaro Monferrato and Vignale Monferrato.

== People ==
- Luigi Longo (1900–1980), Italian politician

== Sport ==
- Margara Golf Open

== Twin towns ==
- Sokponta, Benin
