= Sala Monferrato =

- Comune
- Comune di Sala Monferrato
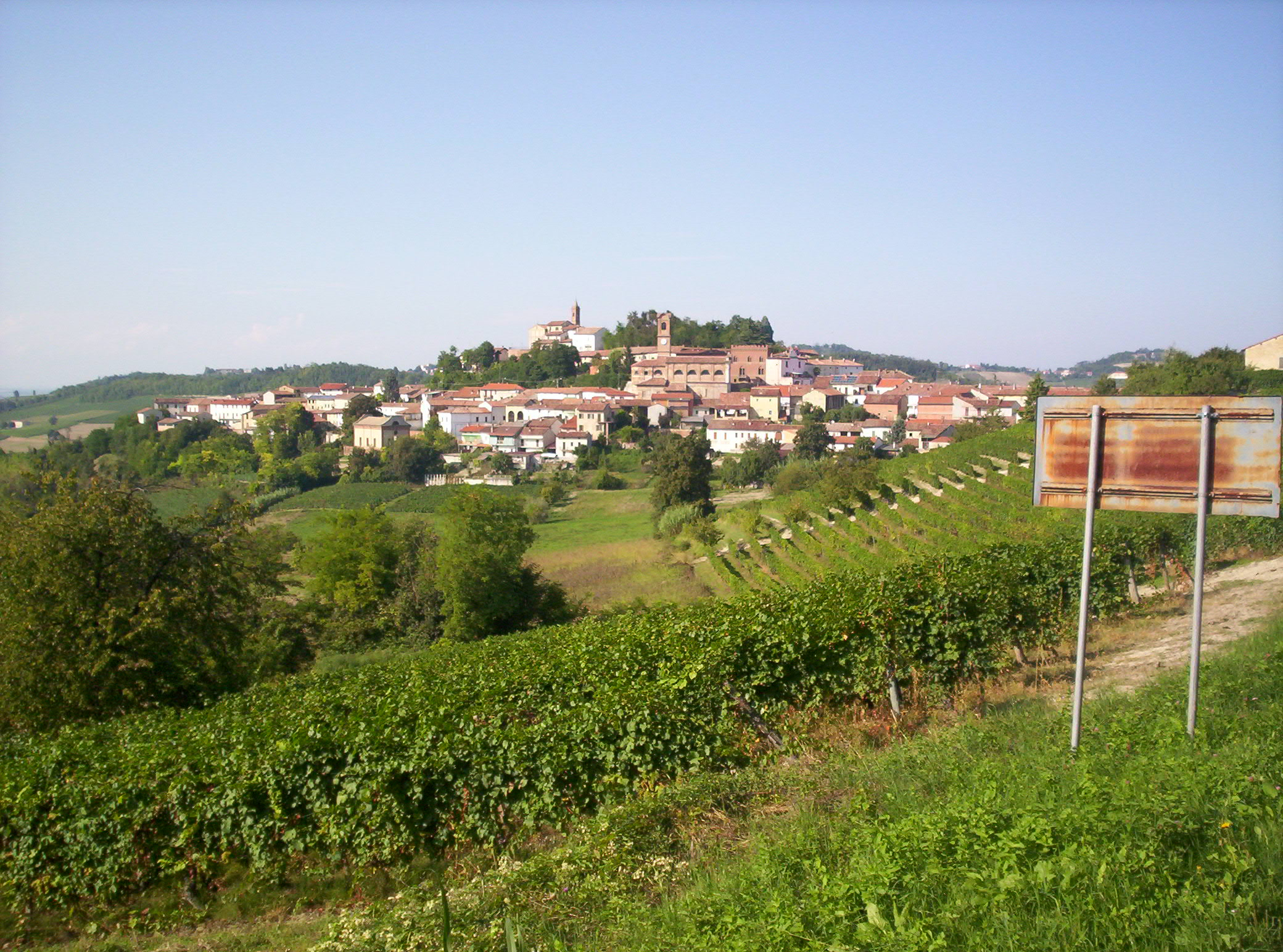

- Coat of arms

- Location within Italy Location within Piedmont
- Coordinates: 45°5′N 8°21′E
- Country: Italy
- Region: Piedmont
- Province: Province of Alessandria (AL)

Area
  - Total: 7.7 km^{2} (3.0 sq mi)
- Elevation: 264 m (866 ft)

Population (Dec. 2004)
  - Total: 446
  - Density: 58/km^{2} (150/sq mi)
- Demonym: Salesi
- Time zone: UTC+1 (CET)
  - Summer (DST): UTC+2 (CEST)
- Postal code: 15030
- Dialing code: 0142

Sala Monferrato is a comune (municipality) in the Province of Alessandria in the Italian region Piedmont, located about 50 kilometres (31 mi) east of Turin and about 30 kilometres (19 mi) northwest of Alessandria. As of 31 December 2004, it had a population of 446 and an area of 7.7 square kilometres (3.0 mi^{2}).

Sala Monferrato borders the following municipalities: Cella Monte, Cereseto, Ottiglio, Ozzano Monferrato, and Treville.

== Demographic evolution ==
Historical population

Year	Pop.	±%
1861	1,194	—
1871	1,365	+14.3%
1881	1,457	+6.7%
1901	1,473	+1.1%
1911	1,461	−0.8%

Year	Pop.	±%
1921	1,424	−2.5%
1931	1,282	−10.0%
1936	1,201	−6.3%
1951	1,026	−14.6%
1961	798	−22.2%

Year	Pop.	±%
1971	703	−11.9%
1981	620	−11.8%
1991	501	−19.2%
2001	475	−5.2%

Source: Data from ISTAT
