= San Giorgio Monferrato =

- Comune
- Comune di San Giorgio Monferrato
- Location within Italy Location within Piedmont
- Coordinates: 45°6′30″N 8°25′2″E
- Country: Italy
- Region: Piedmont
- Province: Alessandria (AL)
- Frazioni: Chiabotto, Cascinotti

Government
  - Mayor: Rino Scarola (M) elected 2004-06-13

Area
  - Total: 7.13 km^{2} (2.75 sq mi)
- Elevation: 281 m (922 ft)

Population (2005)
  - Total: 1,295
  - Density: 182/km^{2} (470/sq mi)
- Demonym: Sangiorgesi
- Time zone: UTC+1 (CET)
  - Summer (DST): UTC+2 (CEST)
- Postal code: 15020
- Dialing code: 0142
- Patron saint: Saint George
- Saint day: 23 April
- Website: Official website

San Giorgio Monferrato (in Piedmontese San Giòrs Monfrà) is a comune of the Province of Alessandria in the Italian region Piedmont. It is about 60 kilometres (37 mi) east of the regional capital Turin and about 25 kilometres (16 mi) northwest of Alessandria.

The territory of this small rural commune of the Monferrato Casalese extends over an area of 7.1 square kilometres (2.7 mi^{2}). Its population of 1,293 is concentrated in the village of San Giorgio (Saint George). The communal coat of arms pictures the saint killing the dragon. San Giorgio clusters around a medieval castle on a low hill southwest of Casale Monferrato, which dominates the road from Casale to Asti.

San Giorgio Monferrato borders the following municipalities: Casale Monferrato, Ozzano Monferrato, and Rosignano Monferrato.

== Demographic evolution ==
Historical population

Year	Pop.	±%
1861	1,046	—
1871	1,154	+10.3%
1881	1,384	+19.9%
1901	1,639	+18.4%
1911	1,708	+4.2%

Year	Pop.	±%
1921	1,656	−3.0%
1931	1,559	−5.9%
1936	1,516	−2.8%
1951	1,428	−5.8%
1961	1,291	−9.6%

Year	Pop.	±%
1971	1,212	−6.1%
1981	1,373	+13.3%
1991	1,325	−3.5%
2001	1,279	−3.5%

Source: Data from ISTAT

== Twin towns ==
San Giorgio Monferrato is twinned with:

- Saint-Julien, France
