= Ottiglio =

- Comune
- Comune di Ottiglio
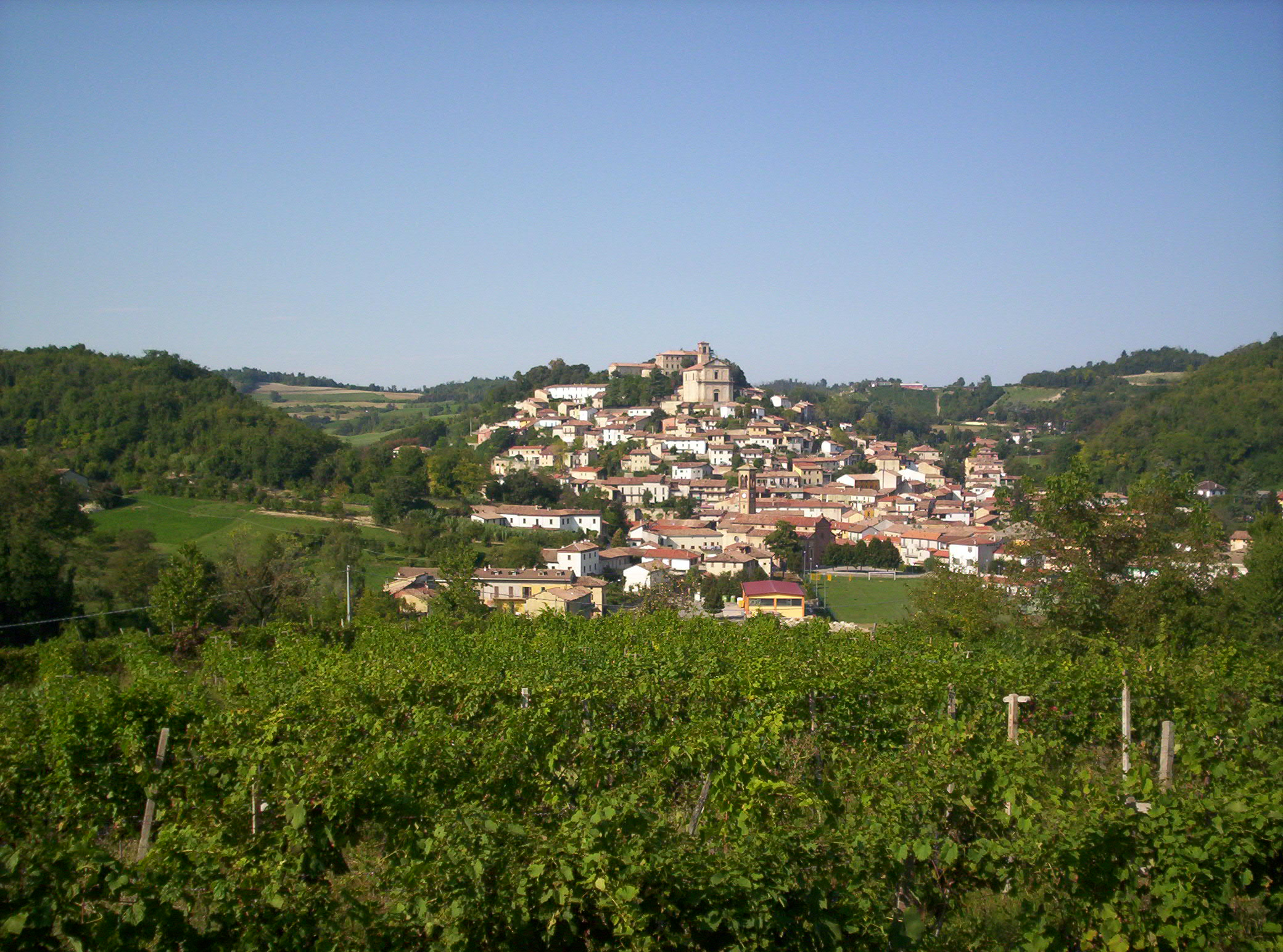

- Coat of arms

- Location within Italy Location within Piedmont
- Coordinates: 45°3′N 8°20′E
- Country: Italy
- Region: Piedmont
- Province: Alessandria (AL)
- Frazioni: Moleto

Government
  - Mayor: Franco Barberis

Area
  - Total: 14.54 km^{2} (5.61 sq mi)
- Elevation: 264 m (866 ft)

Population (1-1-2017)
  - Total: 628
  - Density: 43.2/km^{2} (112/sq mi)
- Demonym: Ottigliese(i)
- Time zone: UTC+1 (CET)
  - Summer (DST): UTC+2 (CEST)
- Postal code: 15038
- Dialing code: 0142
- Saint day: August 2

Ottiglio is a comune (municipality) in the Province of Alessandria in the Italian region Piedmont, located about 50 kilometres (31 mi) east of Turin and about 25 kilometres (16 mi) northwest of Alessandria.

Ottiglio borders the following municipalities: Casorzo, Cella Monte, Cereseto, Frassinello Monferrato, Grazzano Badoglio, Moncalvo, Olivola, and Sala Monferrato.

The actor Ernest Borgnine became honorary citizen in 2006, because his father Camillo Borgnino born in Ottiglio.
