= Felizzano =

- Comune
- Comune di Felizzano
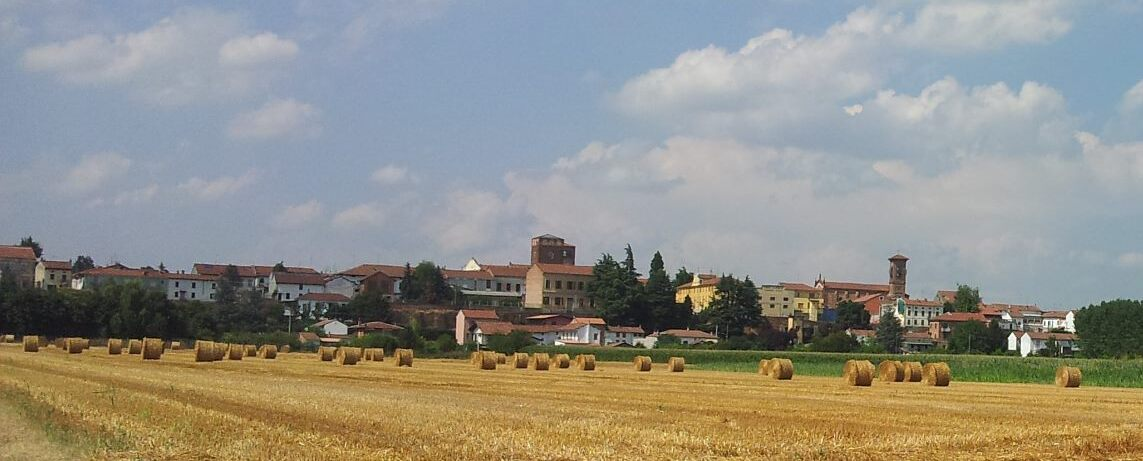

- Location within Italy Location within Piedmont
- Coordinates: 44°54′01″N 8°26′01″E
- Country: Italy
- Region: Piedmont
- Province: Province of Alessandria (AL)

Area
  - Total: 25.2 km^{2} (9.7 sq mi)
- Elevation: 250 m (820 ft)

Population (Dec. 2004)
  - Total: 2,750
  - Density: 109/km^{2} (283/sq mi)
- Demonym: Felizzanesi
- Time zone: UTC+1 (CET)
  - Summer (DST): UTC+2 (CEST)
- Postal code: 15023
- Dialing code: 0131

Felizzano (Flissan in Piemontese) is a comune (municipality) in the Province of Alessandria in the Italian region Piedmont, located about 60 kilometres (37 mi) southeast of Turin and about 15 kilometres (9 mi) west of Alessandria. As of 31 December 2004, it had a population of 2,405 and an area of 25.2 square kilometres (9.7 mi^{2}).

Felizzano borders the following municipalities: Altavilla Monferrato, Fubine, Masio, Oviglio, Quargnento, Quattordio, Solero, and Viarigi.

== Demographic evolution ==
Historical population

Year	Pop.	±%
1861	2,525	—
1871	2,702	+7.0%
1881	3,021	+11.8%
1901	3,525	+16.7%
1911	3,775	+7.1%

Year	Pop.	±%
1921	4,780	+26.6%
1931	4,125	−13.7%
1936	4,350	+5.5%
1951	2,060	−52.6%
1961	2,233	+8.4%

Year	Pop.	±%
1971	2,636	+18.0%
1981	2,645	+0.3%
1991	2,510	−5.1%
2001	2,395	−4.6%

Source: Data from ISTAT
