= Cella Monte =

- Comune
- Comune di Cella Monte
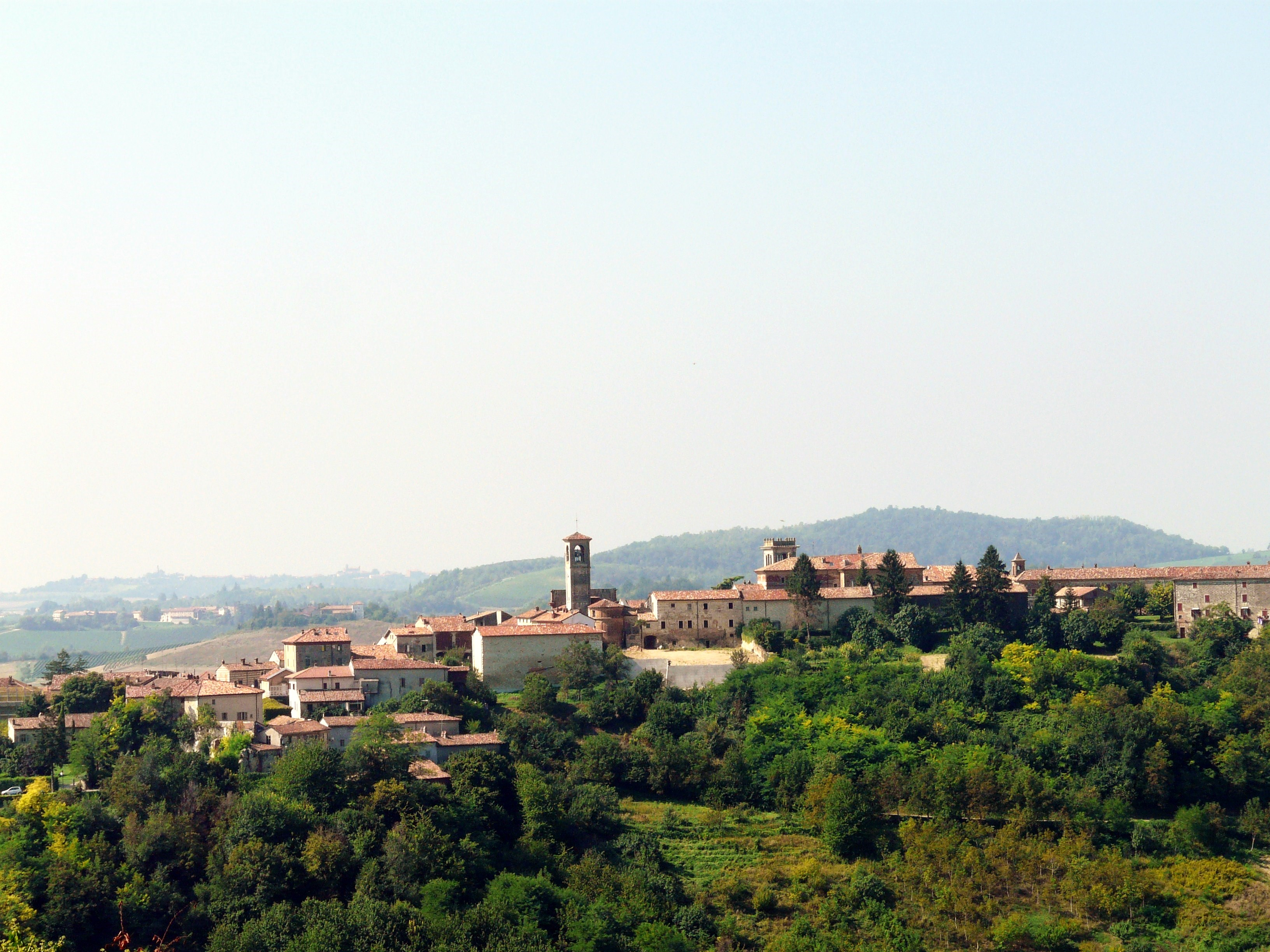

- Coat of arms

- Location within Italy Location within Piedmont
- Coordinates: 45°5′N 8°23′E
- Country: Italy
- Region: Piedmont
- Province: Alessandria (AL)

Government
  - Mayor: Carla Freddi (elected 16 May 2011)

Area
  - Total: 5.6 km^{2} (2.2 sq mi)
- Elevation: 268 m (879 ft)

Population (2005)
  - Total: 542
  - Density: 97/km^{2} (250/sq mi)
- Demonym: Cellesi
- Time zone: UTC+1 (CET)
  - Summer (DST): UTC+2 (CEST)
- Postal code: 15034
- Dialing code: 0142

Cella Monte is a comune (town) in the Province of Alessandria in the Italian region of Piedmont, located about 50 kilometres (31 mi) east of Turin and about 25 kilometres (16 mi) northwest of Alessandria. It has roughly 509 residents.

Cella Monte borders the following municipalities: Frassinello Monferrato, Ottiglio, Ozzano Monferrato, Rosignano Monferrato, and Sala Monferrato. It is one of I Borghi più belli d'Italia ("The most beautiful villages of Italy").

== Name ==
There are two different theories about the origin of the name: one is about wine cellars and the other one about small monasteries. According to the first one the name may derive from the wine cellars that were dug into the sandstone, which is really common in this geographical area. These cellars, called infernot, even though are not being used anymore they still exist nowadays and can be visited. The other theory is about the small monasteries which in Italian are called Celle.

The name appeared for the first time in a document signed by the Emperor Arrigo V in 1116.
