= Olivola =

Olivola Aulìvola
- Comune
- Comune di Olivola
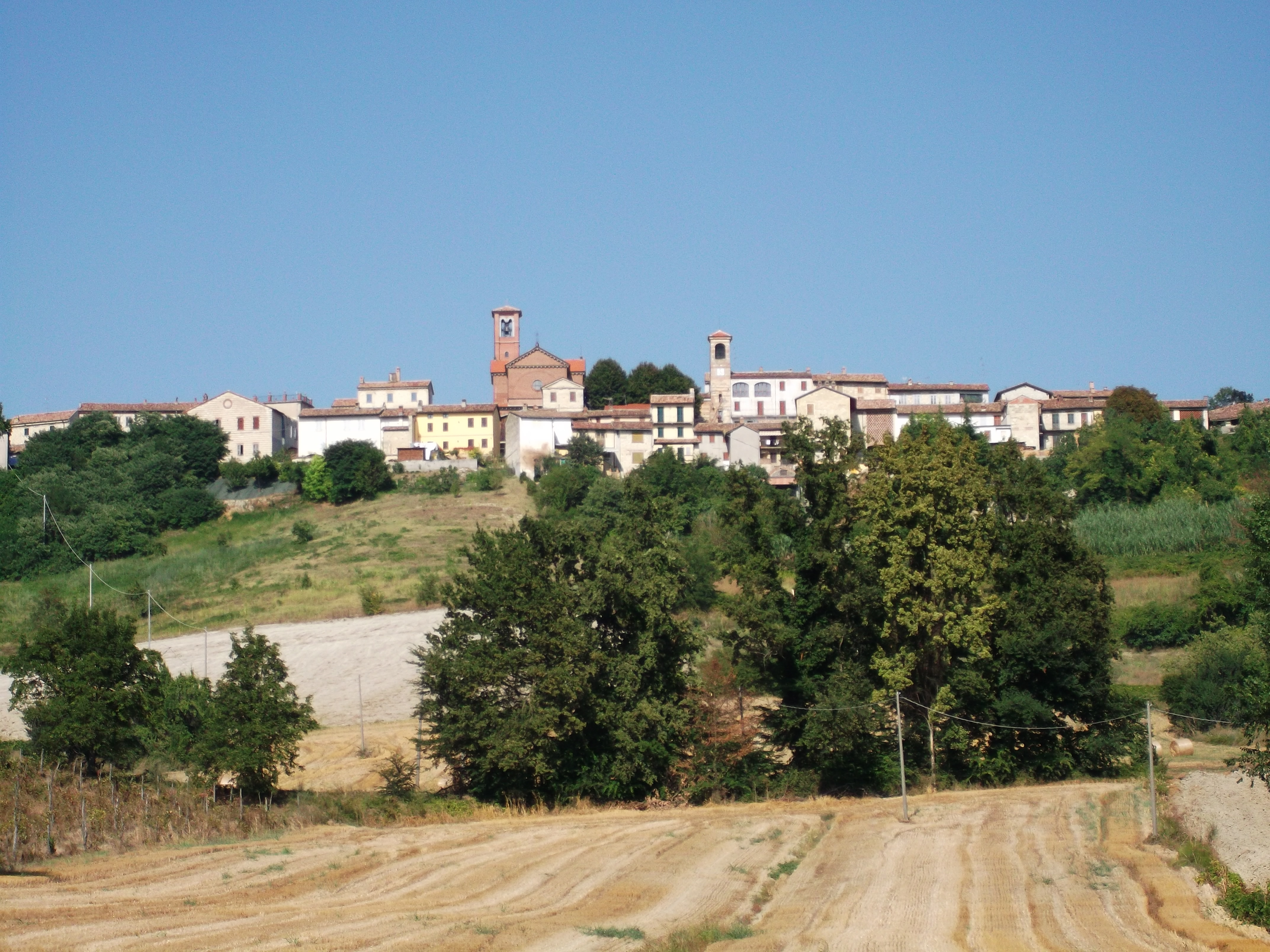

- Coat of arms

- Location within Italy Location within Piedmont
- Coordinates: 45°2′N 8°22′E
- Country: Italy
- Region: Piedmont
- Province: Alessandria (AL)

Government
  - Mayor: Gianmanuele Grossi

Area
  - Total: 2.7 km^{2} (1.0 sq mi)
- Elevation: 280 m (920 ft)

Population (Dec. 2004)
  - Total: 142
  - Density: 53/km^{2} (140/sq mi)
- Demonym: Olivolesi
- Time zone: UTC+1 (CET)
  - Summer (DST): UTC+2 (CEST)
- Postal code: 15030
- Dialing code: 0142

Olivola (Piedmontese: Aulìvola) is a comune (municipality) in the Province of Alessandria in the Italian region Piedmont, about 50 kilometres (31 mi) east of Turin and about 25 kilometres (16 mi) northwest of Alessandria. Olivola borders the municipalities of Casorzo, Frassinello Monferrato, Ottiglio, and Vignale Monferrato.
