= Vignale Monferrato =

- Comune
- Comune di Vignale Monferrato
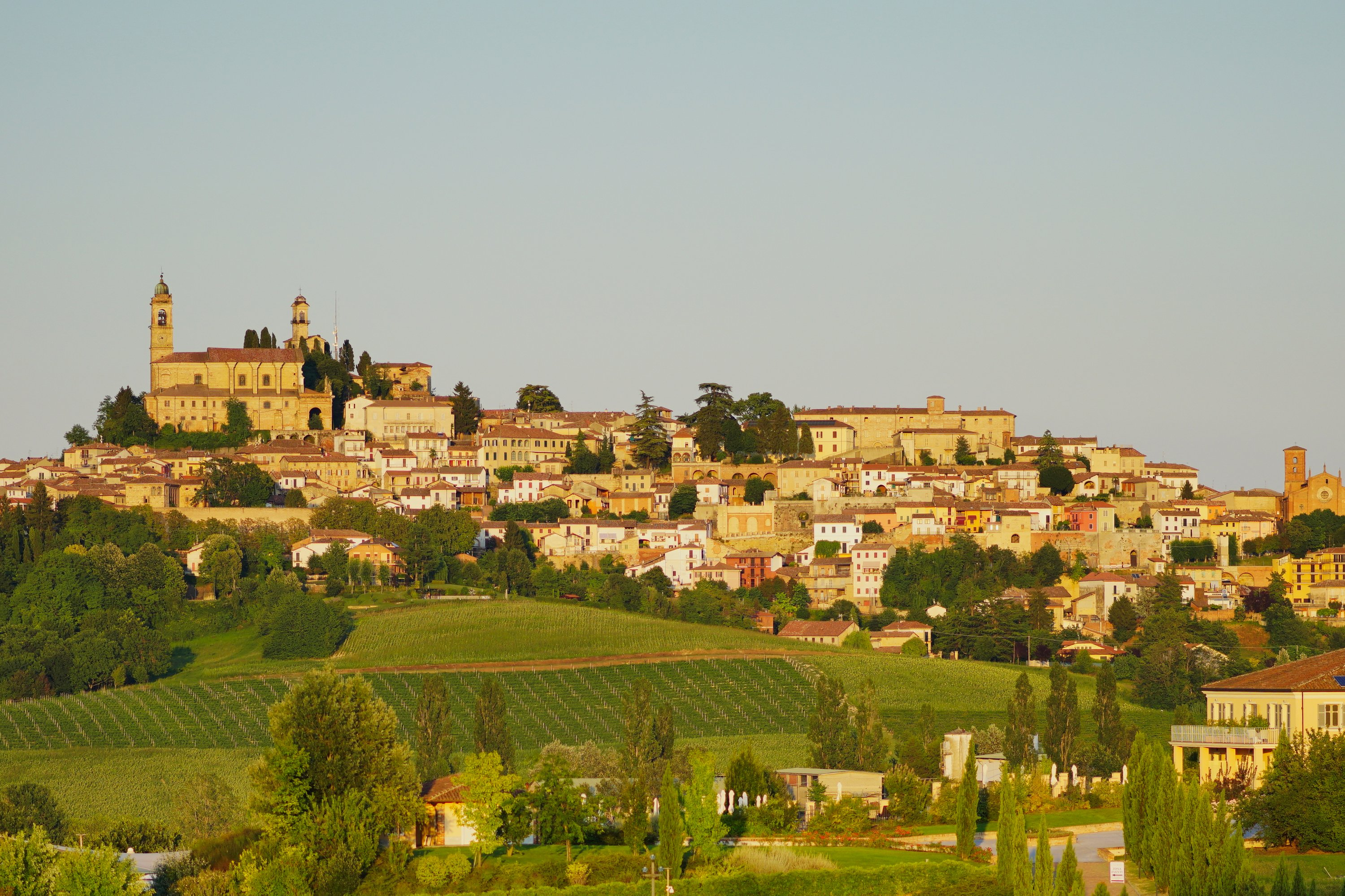

- Location within Italy Location within Piedmont
- Coordinates: 45°1′N 8°24′E
- Country: Italy
- Region: Piedmont
- Province: Alessandria (AL)
- Frazioni: San Lorenzo, Mogliano, Fons Salera

Government
  - Mayor: Ernesta Corona

Area
  - Total: 18.74 km^{2} (7.24 sq mi)
- Elevation: 308 m (1,010 ft)

Population (30 November 2019)
  - Total: 958
  - Density: 51.1/km^{2} (132/sq mi)
- Demonym: Vignalesi
- Time zone: UTC+1 (CET)
  - Summer (DST): UTC+2 (CEST)
- Postal code: 15049
- Dialing code: 0142
- Website: Official website

Vignale Monferrato is a comune (municipality) in the Province of Alessandria in the Italian region Piedmont, located about 60 kilometres (37 mi) east of Turin and about 20 kilometres (12 mi) northwest of Alessandria. Vignale Monferrato borders the following municipalities: Altavilla Monferrato, Camagna Monferrato, Casorzo, Frassinello Monferrato, Fubine, Lu e Cuccaro Monferrato and Olivola.

== People ==
- Eraldo Monzeglio (1906–1981), footballer.
- Piero Drogo, car driver and Ferrari designer
