= Viarigi =

- Comune
- Comune di Viarigi
- Location within Italy Location within Piedmont
- Coordinates: 44°59′N 8°22′E
- Country: Italy
- Region: Piedmont
- Province: Asti (AT)
- Frazioni: Accorneri

Government
  - Mayor: Francesca Ferraris

Area
  - Total: 13.7 km^{2} (5.3 sq mi)
- Elevation: 252 m (827 ft)

Population (31 December 2013)
  - Total: 932
  - Density: 68.0/km^{2} (176/sq mi)
- Demonym: Viarigini
- Time zone: UTC+1 (CET)
  - Summer (DST): UTC+2 (CEST)
- Postal code: 14030
- Dialing code: 0141

Viarigi is a comune (municipality) in the Province of Asti in the Italian region Piedmont, located about 50 kilometres (31 mi) east of Turin and about 15 kilometres (9 mi) northeast of Asti. Viarigi borders the following municipalities: Altavilla Monferrato, Felizzano, Montemagno, Quattordio, and Refrancore.
