= Frassinello Monferrato =

- Comune
- Comune di Frassinello Monferrato
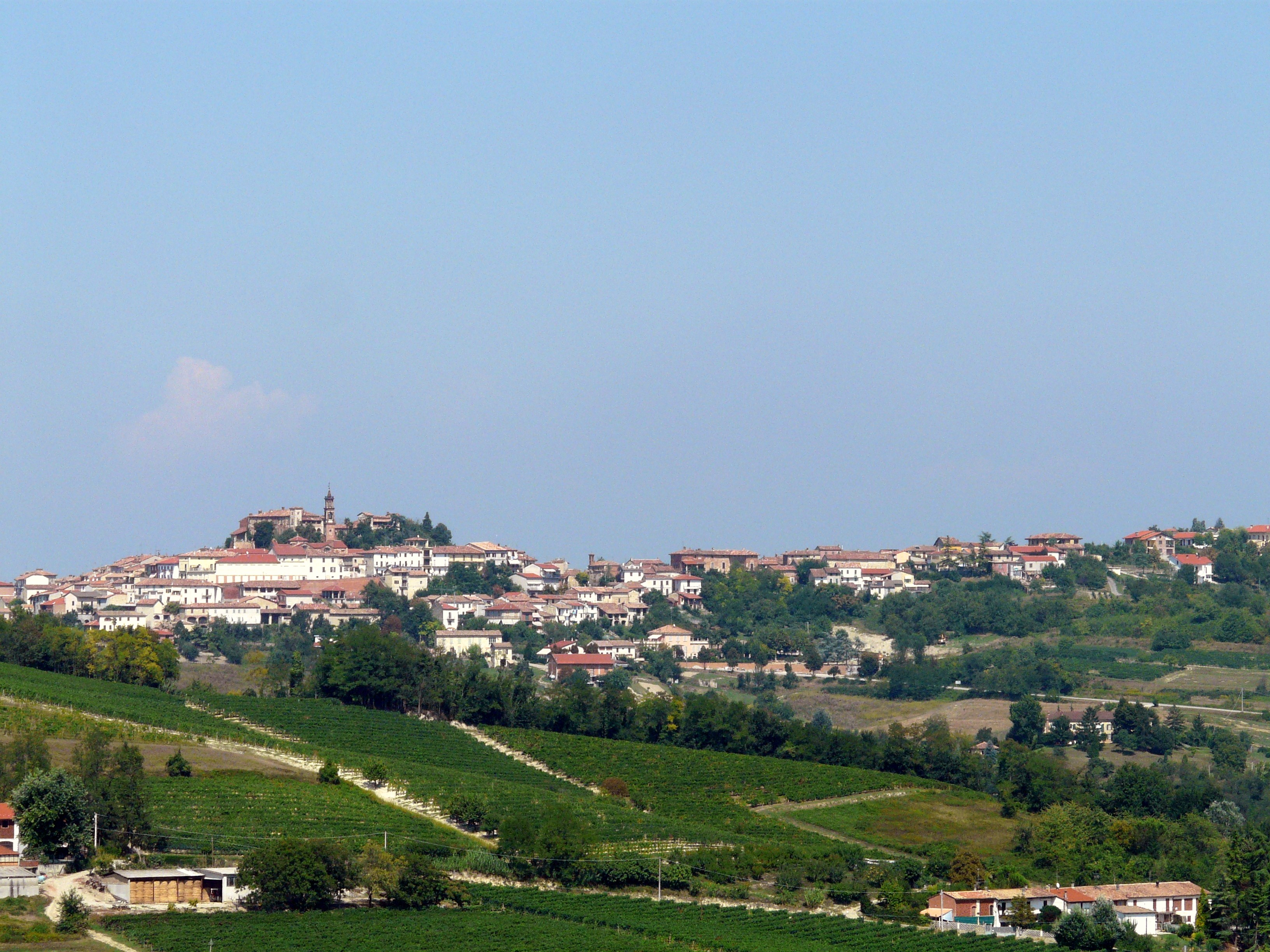

- Coat of arms

- Location within Italy Location within Piedmont
- Coordinates: 45°2′N 8°23′E
- Country: Italy
- Region: Piedmont
- Province: Alessandria (AL)

Government
  - Mayor: Federico Andreone

Area
  - Total: 8.43 km^{2} (3.25 sq mi)
- Elevation: 529 m (1,736 ft)

Population (31 August 2017)
  - Total: 497
  - Density: 59.0/km^{2} (153/sq mi)
- Demonym: Frassinellesi
- Time zone: UTC+1 (CET)
  - Summer (DST): UTC+2 (CEST)
- Postal code: 15035
- Dialing code: 0142
- Website: Official website

Frassinello Monferrato is a comune (municipality) in the Province of Alessandria in the Italian region Piedmont, located about 50 kilometres (31 mi) east of Turin and about 25 kilometres (16 mi) northwest of Alessandria.

Frassinello Monferrato borders the following municipalities: Camagna Monferrato, Cella Monte, Olivola, Ottiglio, Rosignano Monferrato, and Vignale Monferrato.
