= Amedori =

Amedori is a surname. Notable people with the surname include:

- Carmen M. Amedori (born 1955), American journalist and politician
- John Patrick Amedori (born 1987), American actor
