= Cereseto =

- Comune
- Comune di Cereseto
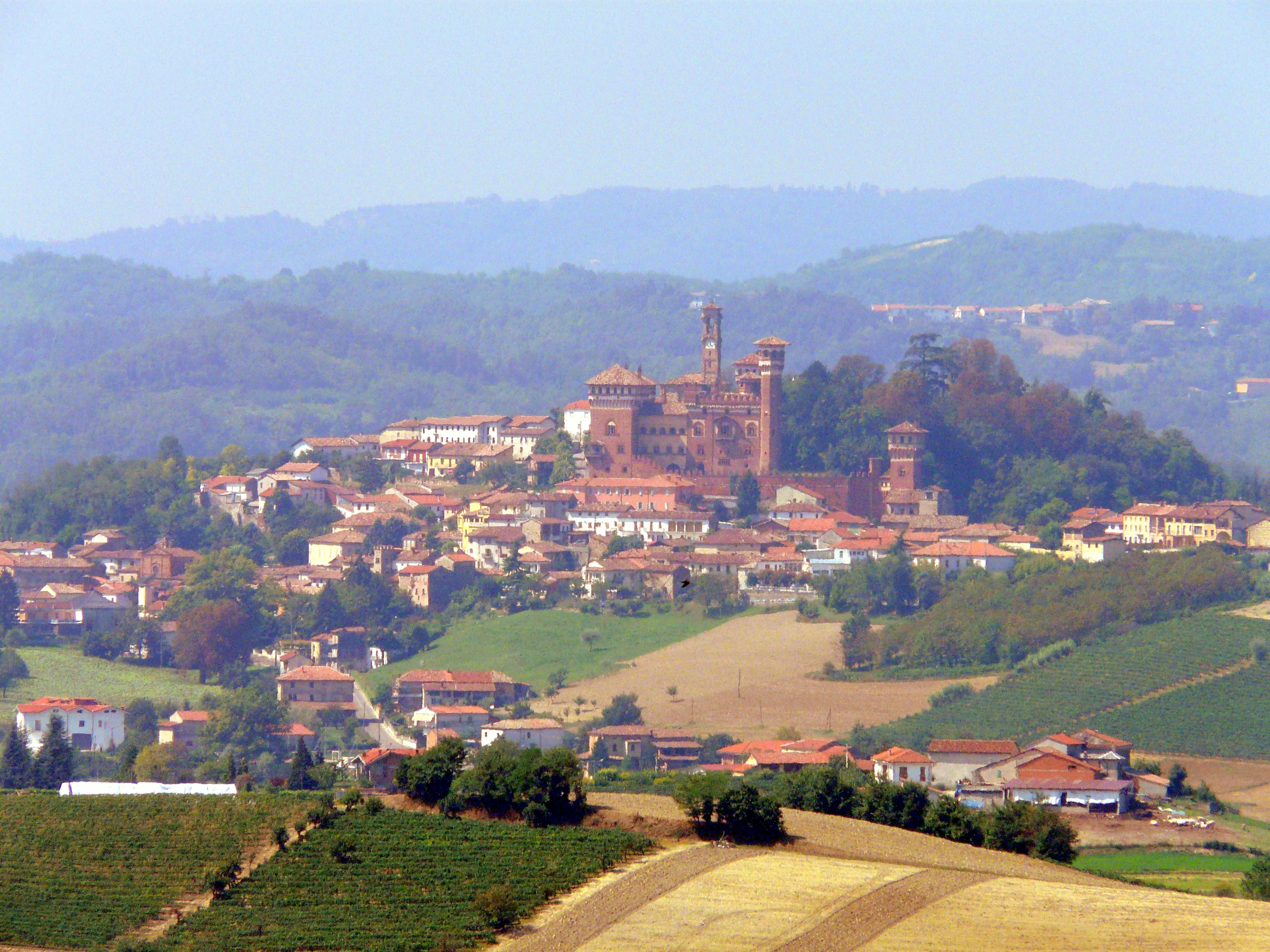

- Location within Italy Location within Piedmont
- Coordinates: 45°5′N 8°19′E
- Country: Italy
- Region: Piedmont
- Province: Province of Alessandria (AL)

Area
  - Total: 10.4 km^{2} (4.0 sq mi)

Population (Dec. 2004)
  - Total: 471
  - Density: 45.3/km^{2} (117/sq mi)
- Time zone: UTC+1 (CET)
  - Summer (DST): UTC+2 (CEST)
- Postal code: 15020
- Dialing code: 0142

Cereseto is a comune (municipality) in the Province of Alessandria in the Italian region Piedmont.

== Location ==
Cereseto is about 50 kilometres (31 mi) east of Turin and about 30 kilometres (19 mi) northwest of Alessandria, on the trunk road linking Asti to Casale Monferrato. It borders the municipalities of Moncalvo, Ottiglio, Ozzano Monfer, Pontestura, Ponzano Monferrato, Sala Monferrato, Serralunga di Crea, and Treville. The commune covers an area of 1,040 hectares (2,600 acres), and is 280 metres (920 ft) above sea level. The town is perched on a hill, and is dominated by the castle.

== History ==
The town was probably established around 500–600 AD. It is mentioned in records of the Bishop of Asti from around 957 AD. Names included Cirisidum, Cerisido, Cirisito, Cirisido, Cerexeti, Cireseto and finally Cereseto, probably referring to the many cherry trees in the area. The town was the property of the Graseverto family of Asti, who probably built the first castle around 900–1000 AD. The municipal statutes were first drafted in 1358. The castle was completely demolished in 1600.

In 1910, the financier Riccardo Gualino and his wife launched construction of a new castle with almost 150 rooms in Cereseto. The Castello di Cereseto, in Neo-Gothic Piedmontese-Lombard style, was completed in 1913. In 1931 Gualino was confined by the fascist regime to the Aeolian island of Lipari on charges of fraudulent bankruptcy and suffered the confiscation of all his property. The castle went through various changes of ownership, and at one time hosted one of the most impressive illegal drug refineries and laboratories in Europe. Later it became property of the financier Carlo Mereta's Martina company. As of December 2014 that company was bankrupt, and new owners were being sought.

== Demographic evolution ==
As of 31 December 2004, Cereseto had a population of 471 and an area of 10.4 square kilometres (4.0 mi^{2}).

Historical population

Year	Pop.	±%
1861	1,274	—
1871	1,319	+3.5%
1881	1,379	+4.5%
1901	1,463	+6.1%
1911	1,427	−2.5%

Year	Pop.	±%
1921	1,340	−6.1%
1931	1,238	−7.6%
1936	1,141	−7.8%
1951	1,037	−9.1%
1961	819	−21.0%

Year	Pop.	±%
1971	618	−24.5%
1981	493	−20.2%
1991	426	−13.6%
2001	431	+1.2%

Source: Data from ISTAT

== Sources ==
- "Cereseto: italiani, polacchi e russi vogliono il castello". Il Monferrato (in Italian). 2014-12-20.
- Ponzetti, Francesca (2011). "Il caso Gualino" (PDF). Teatro e Storia (in Italian).
- "Riccardo Gualino (Biella, 1879 - Firenze, 1964)". Museo Torino.
- "Riccardo Gualino". Storia e Cultura dell'Industria.
