= Montemagno, Piedmont =

Montemagno
- Comune
- Comune di Montemagno
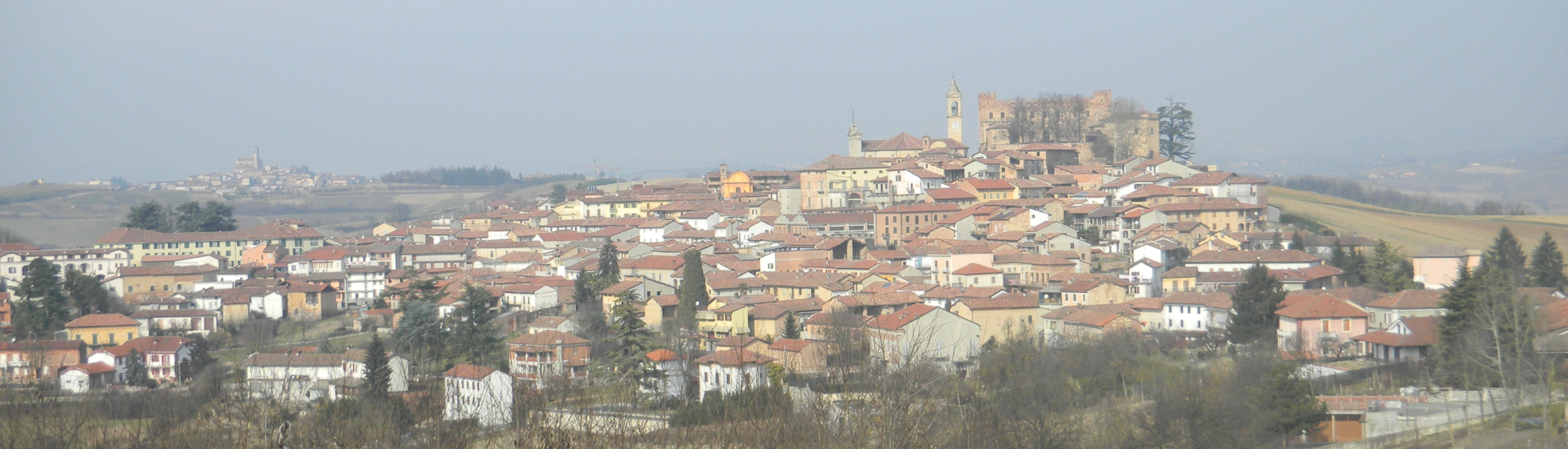
- Panorama of Montemagno

- Coat of arms

- Location within Italy Location within Piedmont
- Coordinates: 44°59′N 8°19′E
- Country: Italy
- Region: Piedmont
- Province: Province of Asti (AT)
- Frazioni: Santo Stefano, San Carlo

Government
  - Mayor: Paolo Porta (since 8 June 2009) (La tua voce per il paese)

Area
  - Total: 15.9 km^{2} (6.1 sq mi)
- Elevation: 260 m (850 ft)

Population (31 December 2010)
  - Total: 1,203
  - Density: 75.7/km^{2} (196/sq mi)
- Demonym: Montemagnesi
- Time zone: UTC+1 (CET)
  - Summer (DST): UTC+2 (CEST)
- Postal code: 14030
- Dialing code: 0141
- Patron saint: St. Martin of Tours
- Saint day: 11 November
- Website: http://www.comune.montemagno.at.it/

Montemagno (Montmagn in Piedmontese) is a comune (municipality) in the Province of Asti in the Italian region Piedmont, located about 50 kilometres (31 mi) east of Turin and about 13 kilometres (8 mi) northeast of Asti. As of 31 December 2010 it had a population of 1,228 and an area of 15.9 square kilometres (6.1 mi^{2}).

The municipality of Montemagno contains the frazioni (subdivisions, mainly villages and hamlets) Santo Stefano and San Carlo.

Montemagno borders the following municipalities: Altavilla Monferrato (AL), Casorzo, Castagnole Monferrato, Grana, Refrancore, and Viarigi.

Founded around the year 1000, Montemagno is a hamlet consisting of twelve alleys labeled by Roman numerals connoting its identity, and is included in the "Castelli Aperti" circuit in southern Piedmont.

== Attractions and landmarks ==
The Casa sul portone, the last remaining gate of the defensive wall, and the Baroque Cumiana-stone staircase are historically valuable.

The chiesa di San Vittore, the Romanesque church dedicated to Saint Victor, with a high bell tower at its side, is appreciable from an architectural standpoint.

The chiesa campestre di Santa Maria di Vallinò, the small country church dedicated to Vallinò's Madonna, where the local population makes frequent pilgrimages to, is immersed in the countryside. In the last years the small church has been a picnicking place for tourists, thanks to its privileged location at the center of a valley among the hills of the village.

On La Stampa daily newspaper, the square of the chiesa parrocchiale dei Santi Martino e Stefano was mentioned as one of the most beautiful squares in Piedmont, because the staircase and the church dominating it are very similar to the ones at Piazza di Spagna in Rome.

Attractions and landmarks

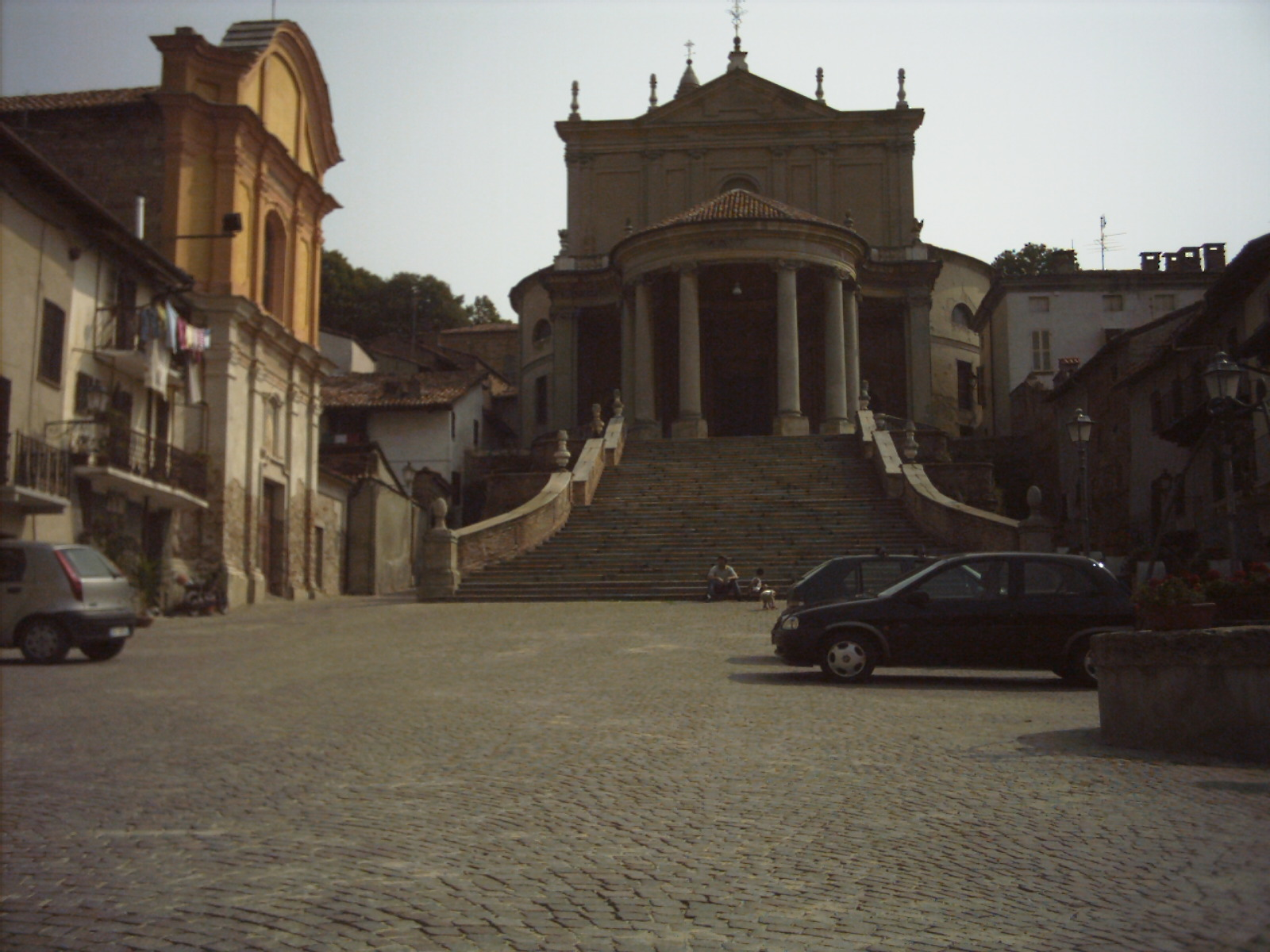
Chiesa parrocchiale dei Santi Martino e Stefano

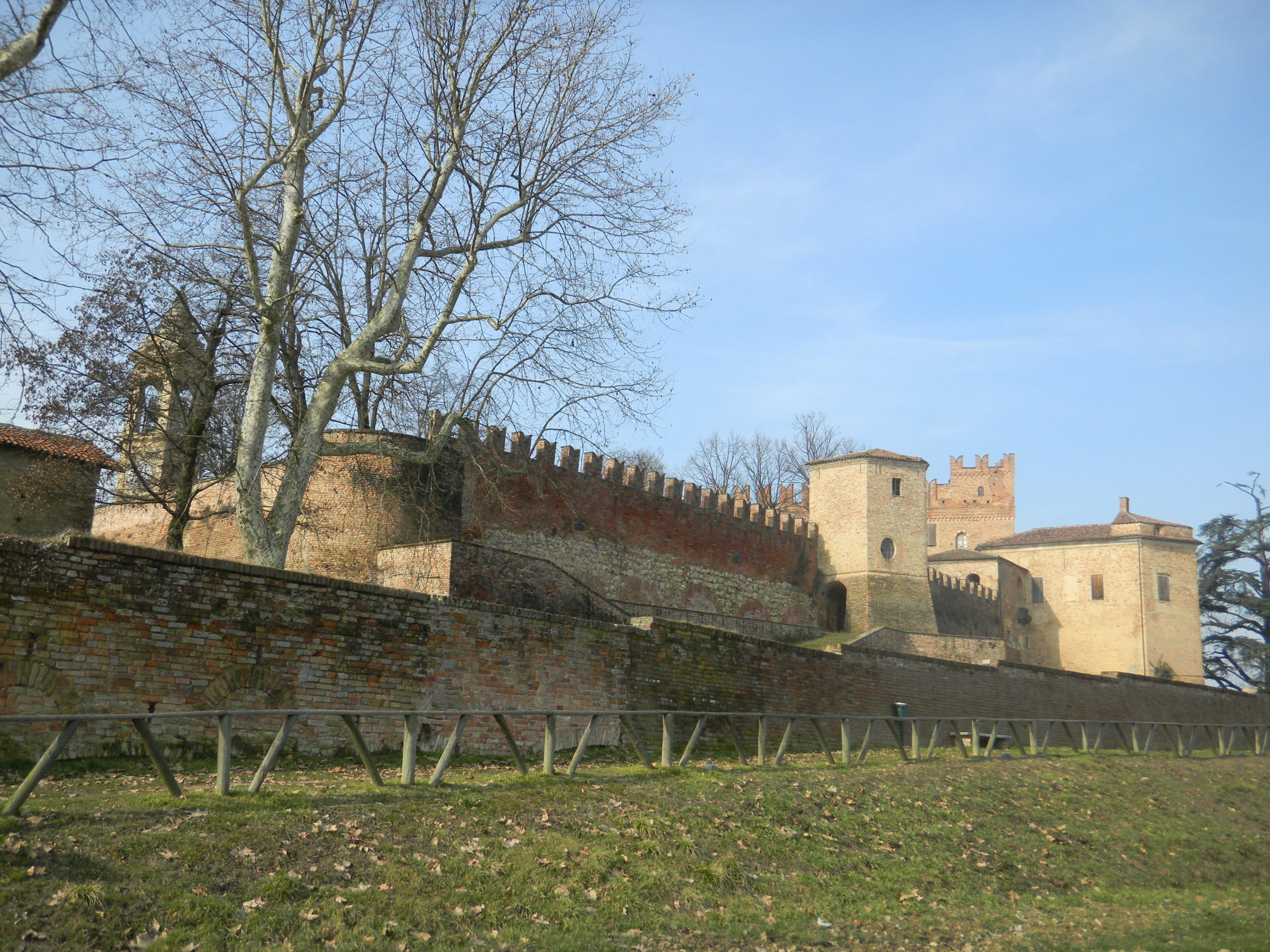
The castle

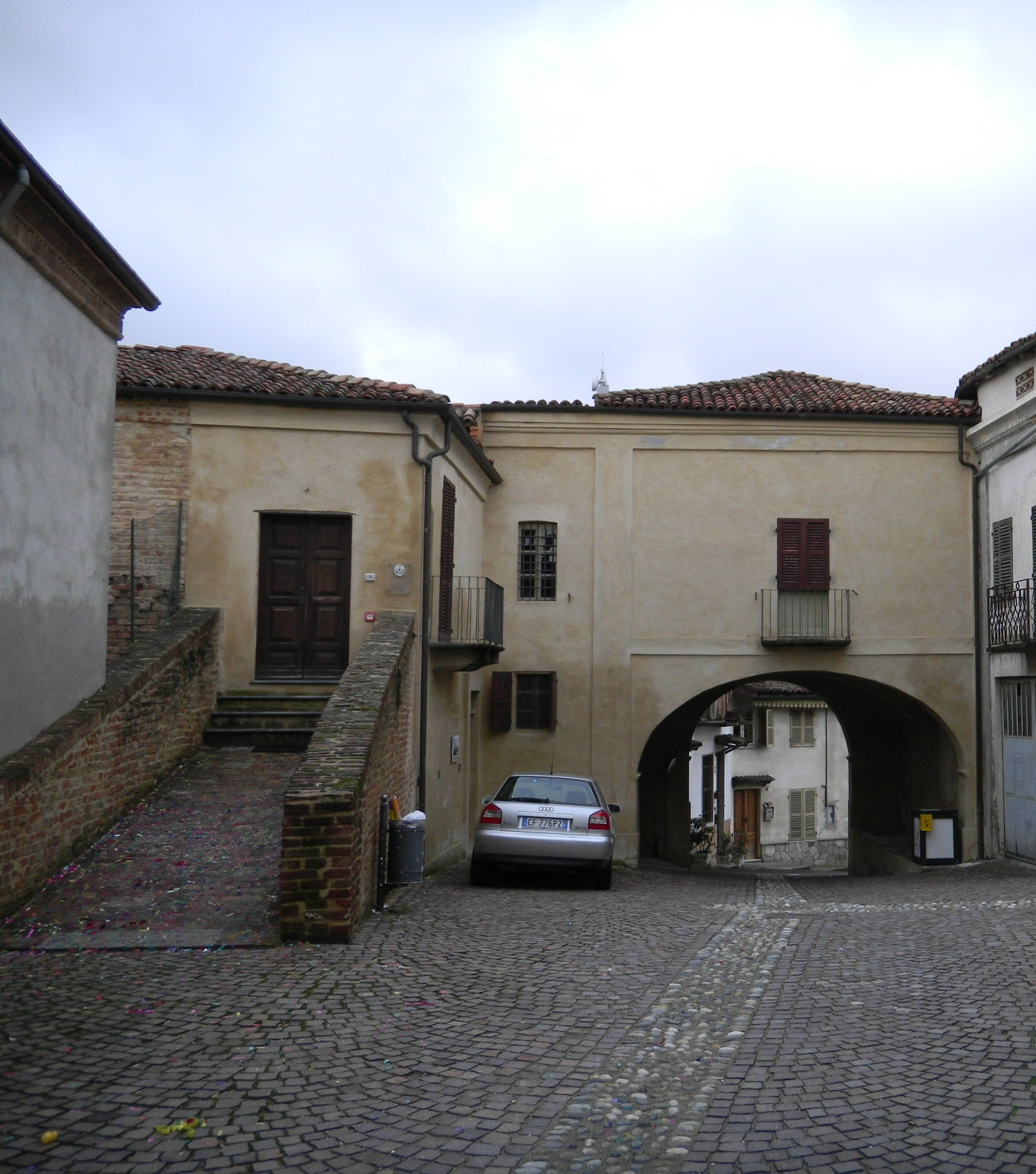
Casa sul Portone

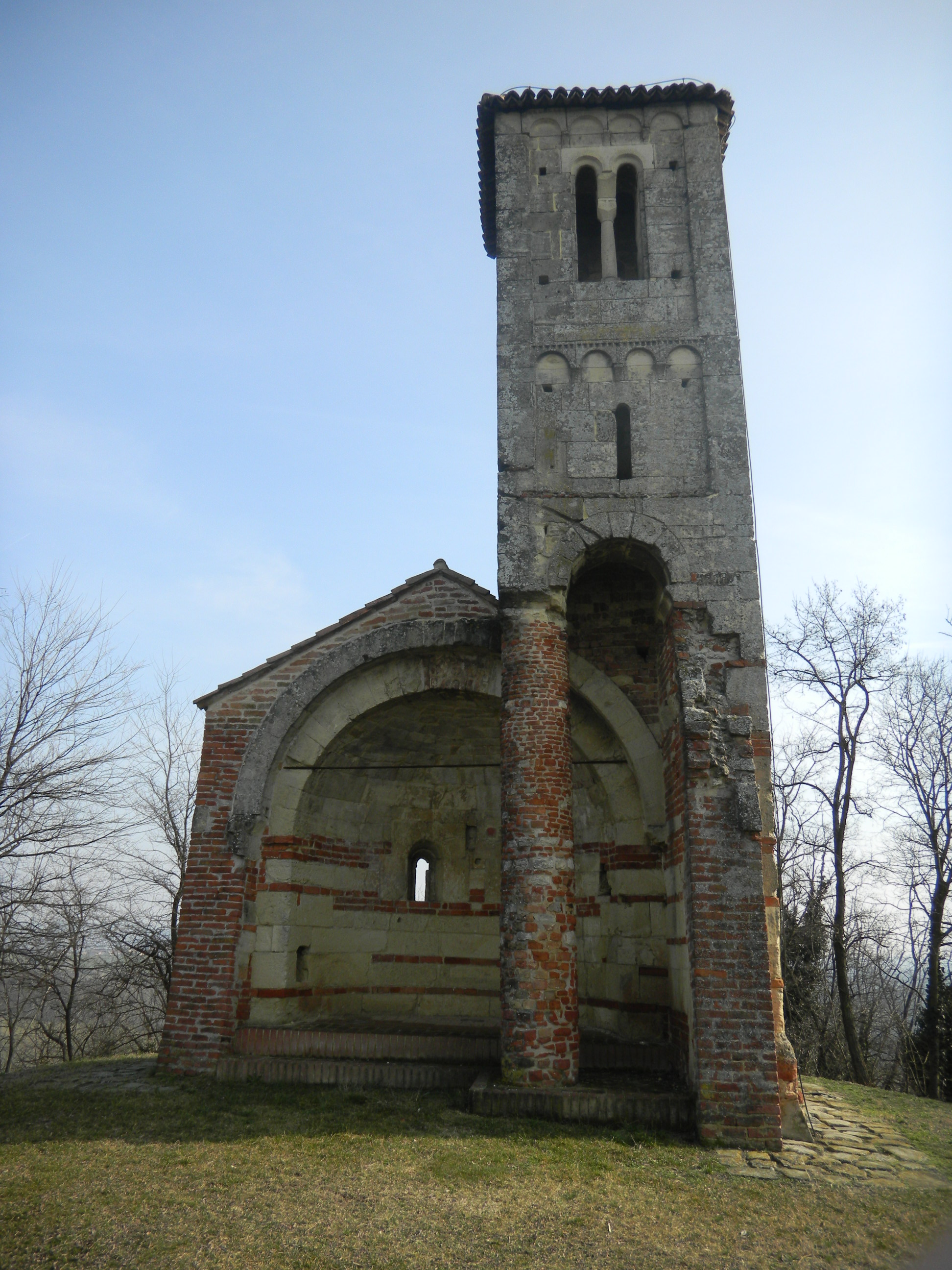
Torre di San Vittore

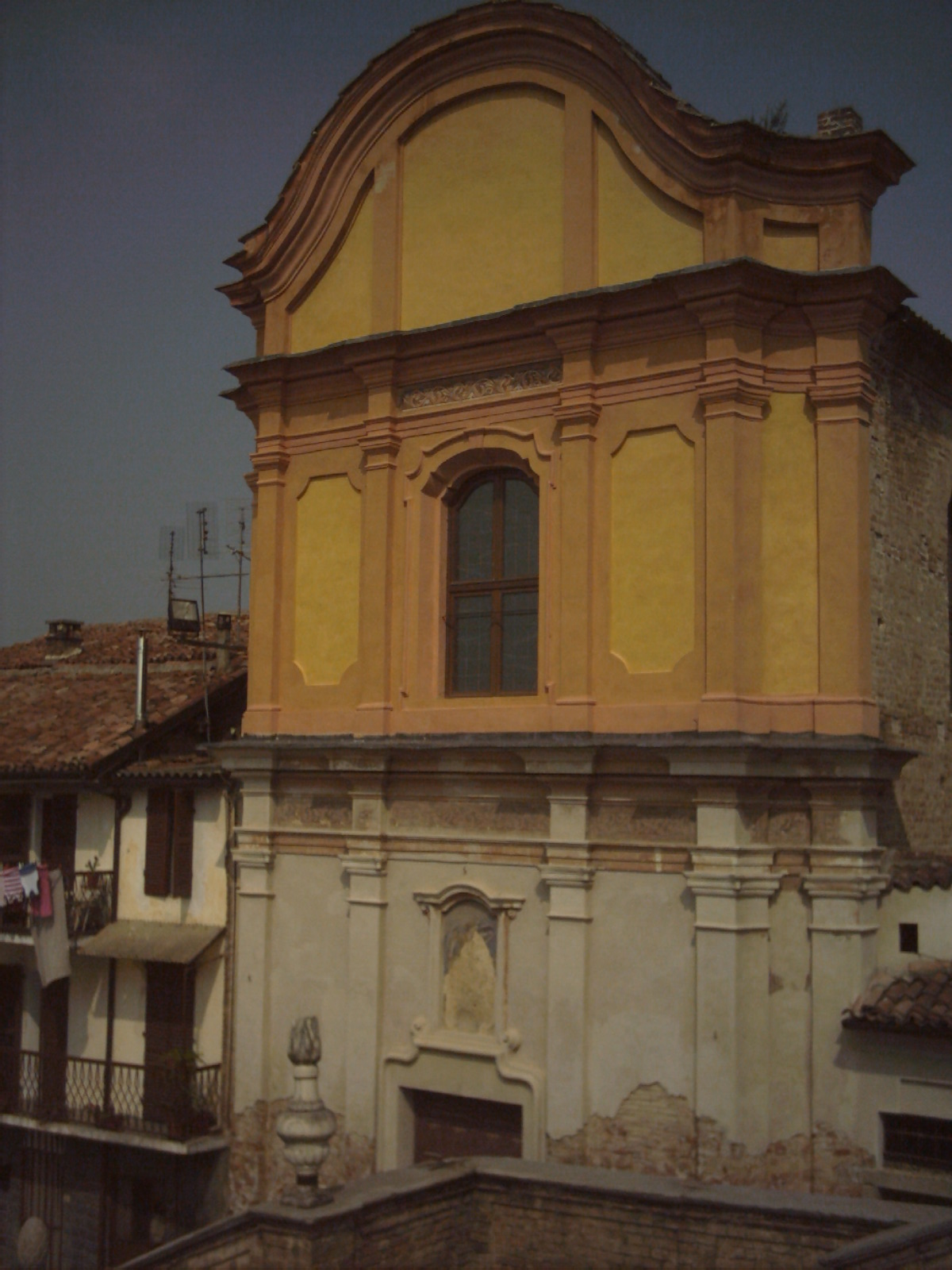
Chiesa della Confraternita di San Michele Arcangelo

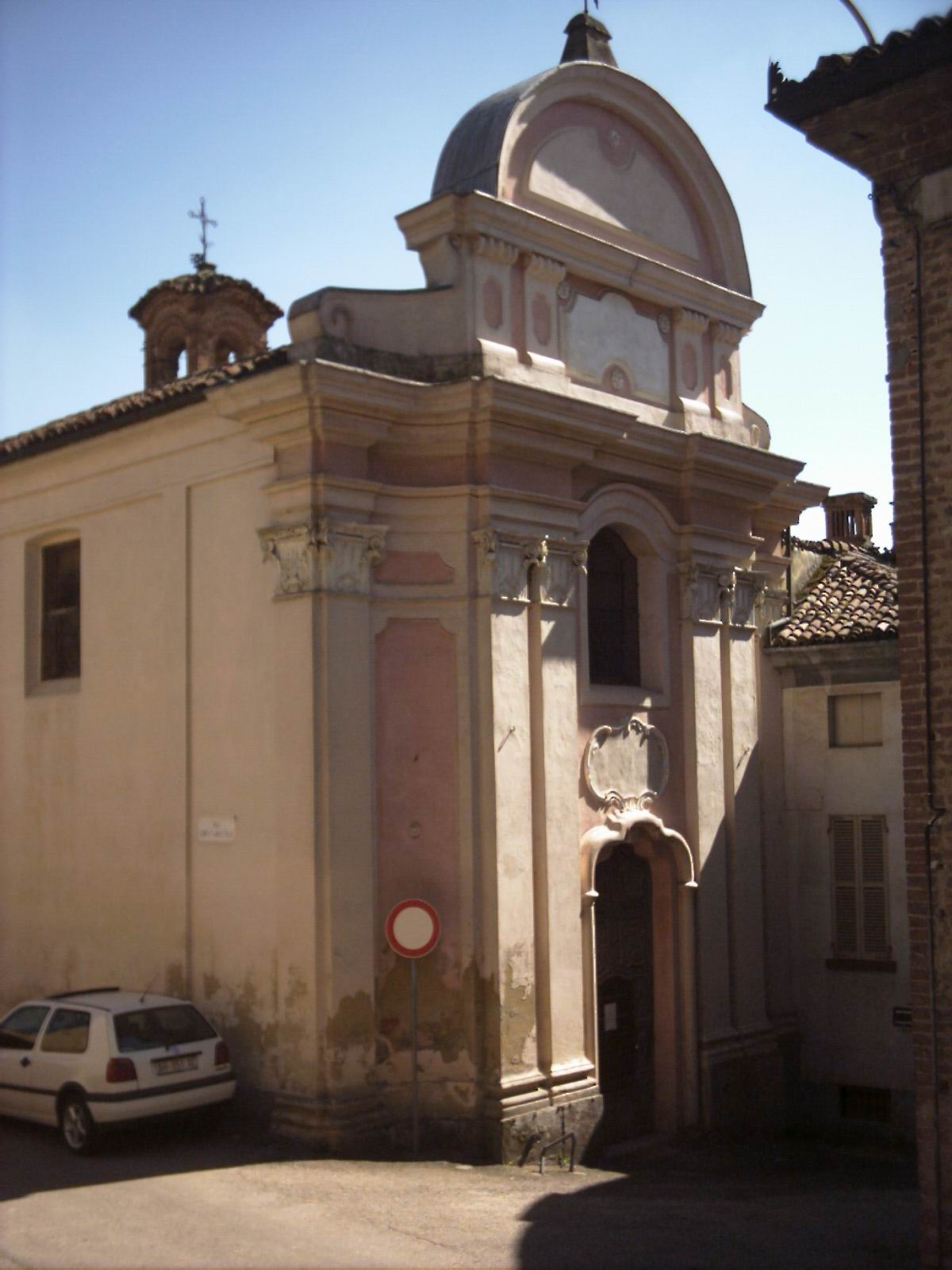
Chiesa della Confraternita della Santissima Trinità

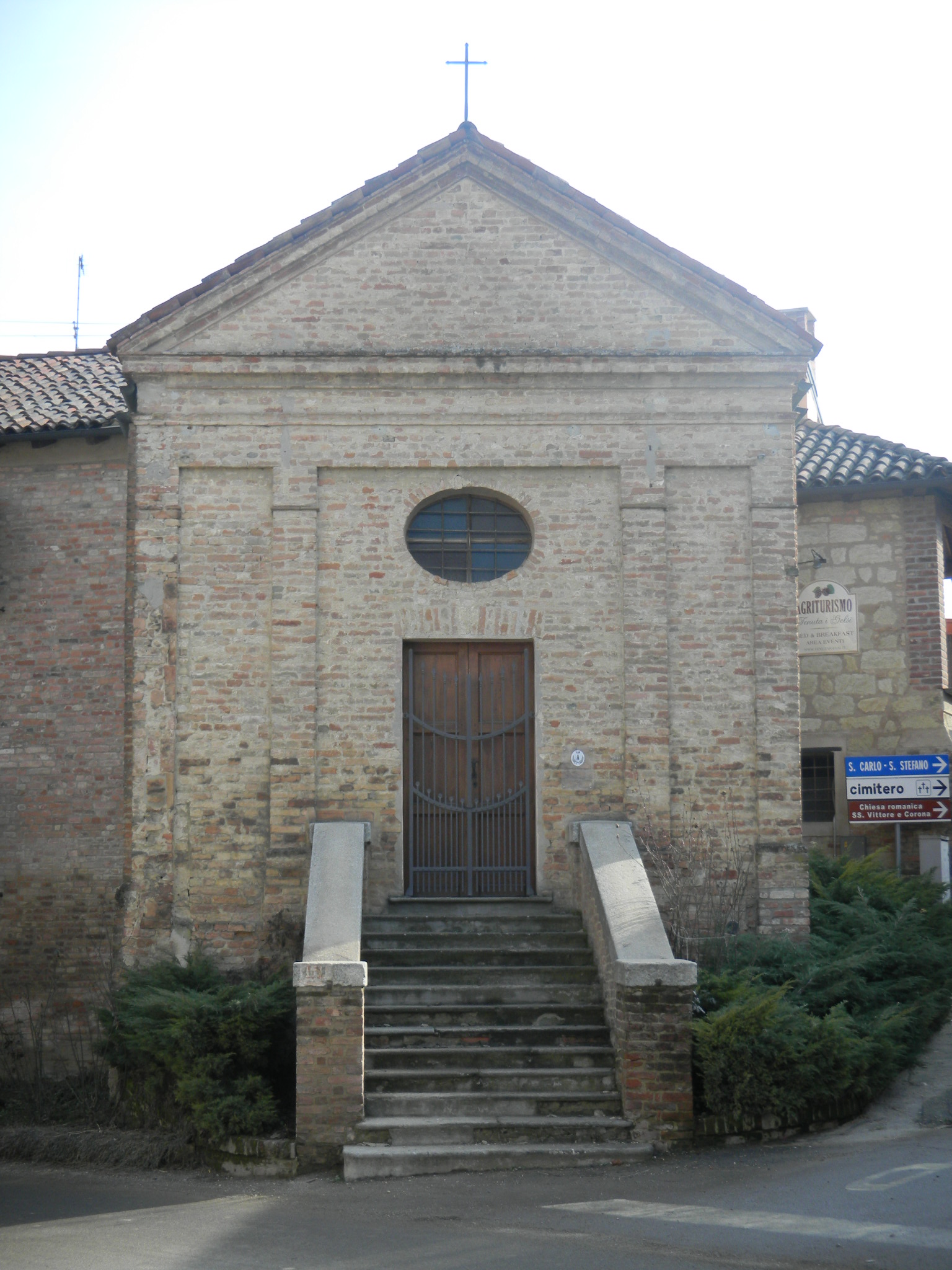
Chiesa di Santa Maria della Cava

== Demographic evolution ==
Historical population

Year	Pop.	±%
1861	2,933	—
1871	3,211	+9.5%
1881	3,520	+9.6%
1901	3,746	+6.4%
1911	3,194	−14.7%

Year	Pop.	±%
1921	2,976	−6.8%
1931	2,669	−10.3%
1936	2,461	−7.8%
1951	2,015	−18.1%
1961	1,705	−15.4%

Year	Pop.	±%
1971	1,475	−13.5%
1981	1,295	−12.2%
1991	1,180	−8.9%
2001	1,205	+2.1%

Source: Data from ISTAT

== Notable people ==
- Bice Mortara Garavelli, linguist
- Umberto Lombardo, football player
- Luigi Giuseppe Lasagna, second Salesian bishop, missionary in Brazil
- Luigi Bianco, archbishop, Apostolic nuncio in Honduras
