= Rosignano Monferrato =

- Comune
- Comune di Rosignano Monferrato
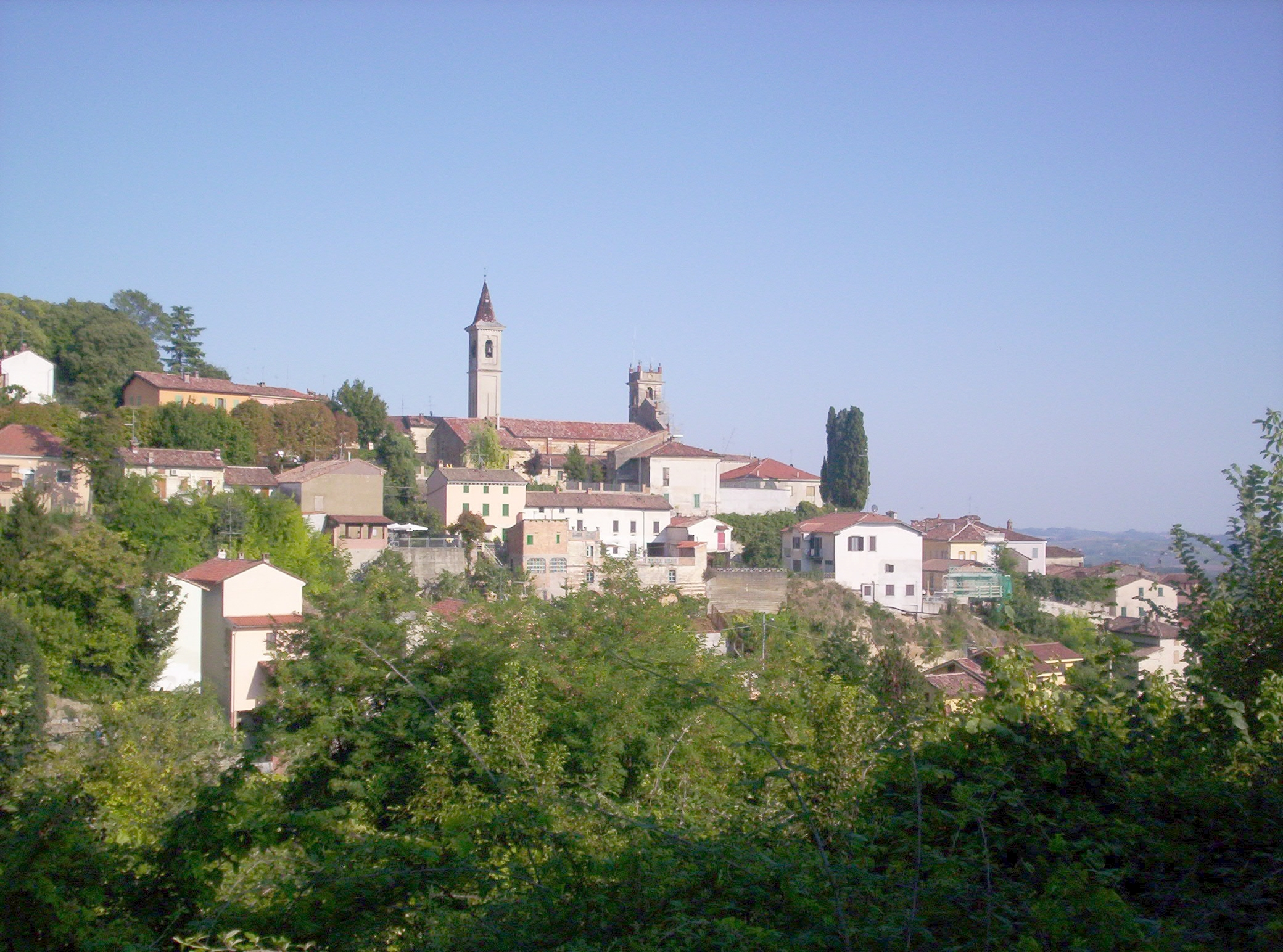

- Coat of arms

- Location within Italy Location within Piedmont
- Coordinates: 45°5′N 8°24′E
- Country: Italy
- Region: Piedmont
- Province: Province of Alessandria (AL)

Area
  - Total: 19.2 km^{2} (7.4 sq mi)

Population (Dec. 2004)
  - Total: 1,659
  - Density: 86.4/km^{2} (224/sq mi)
- Time zone: UTC+1 (CET)
  - Summer (DST): UTC+2 (CEST)
- Postal code: 15030
- Dialing code: 0142

Rosignano Monferrato is a comune (municipality) in the Province of Alessandria in the Italian region Piedmont, located about 60 kilometres (37 mi) east of Turin and about 25 kilometres (16 mi) northwest of Alessandria. As of 31 December 2004, it had a population of 1,659 and an area of 19.2 square kilometres (7.4 mi^{2}).

Rosignano Monferrato borders the following municipalities: Camagna Monferrato, Casale Monferrato, Cella Monte, Frassinello Monferrato, Ozzano Monferrato, San Giorgio Monferrato, and Terruggia.

== People ==
- Captain Michele Amatore died here in 1883.

== Demographic evolution ==
Historical population

Year	Pop.	±%
1861	2,828	—
1871	2,968	+5.0%
1881	3,408	+14.8%
1901	3,703	+8.7%
1911	3,616	−2.3%

Year	Pop.	±%
1921	3,294	−8.9%
1931	3,086	−6.3%
1936	2,964	−4.0%
1951	2,650	−10.6%
1961	2,239	−15.5%

Year	Pop.	±%
1971	1,785	−20.3%
1981	1,579	−11.5%
1991	1,594	+0.9%
2001	1,650	+3.5%

Source: Data from ISTAT
