= Davide Amadori =

Italian footballer (born 1992)

Personal information
- Date of birth: 18 July 1992 (age 34)
- Place of birth: Milan, Italy
- Position: Goalkeeper

Team information
- Current team: Vigevano

Youth career
- 2008–2009: AlbinoLeffe

Senior career*
Years	Team	Apps	(Gls)
2008–2016	AlbinoLeffe	40	(0)
2009–2011	Renate (loan)	25	(0)
2011–2012	Venezia (loan)	28	(0)
- * Club domestic league appearances and goals as of 6 June 2013

Davide Amadori (born 18 July 1992) is an Italian footballer who plays as a goalkeeper for Vigevano.
