= Christian Amatore =

French chemist (born 1951)

Christian Amatore (born 9 December 1951 in Algeria) is a French chemist and a member of the French Academy of Sciences. He is an author of works in electrochemistry.

== Biography ==
Coming from a modest family (Sicilian by his father, Swedish by his mother), he spent a large part of his childhood in Algeria in several garrison towns of Laghouat, Hain-el-Adjar, Sidi Bel Abbès where his father was an NCO of the Foreign Legion. He followed his father's advice "if you are intelligent but you have no education, you remain mute" and followed brilliant studies in Algeria and then in France where his Blackfoot family was repatriated: first to the Lycée Pascal-Paoli in Corte, then to the Lycée Thiers in Marseille where he completed two years of preparatory classes, and finally to the École normale supérieure (rue d'Ulm - Paris) where he obtained the agrégation de chimie in 1974. At the age of 18, he opted for French nationality. Following his thesis at the University of Paris-VII under Jean-Michel Savéant, he was recruited by CNRS as a Research Associate Professor in Physical Chemistry. After this, he left for the United States for two years as Assistant Professor in an organometallic chemistry research laboratory where he met Mark Wightman at Indiana University with whom he had a pioneering role in the development of ultramicroelectrodes that he applied in artificial synapses. In 1984, he returned to France to found his laboratory at the ENS and became Director of the Chemistry Department at the ENS in 1997. He held these management functions until 2006.

== Career ==
- Normalien (1971), agrégé de chimie (1974), docteur ès sciences (1979), docteur honoris causa from several European and Asian universities
- Research Director at the CNRS, Professor at the ENS.
- Correspondent of the French Academy of Sciences in April 1996, member in November 2002.
- Delegate for Education and Training of the French Academy of Sciences (2011)
- Member of the steering committee of the Fondation Écologie d'Avenir.

== Awards ==
- 2018 Fray International Sustainability Award at SIPS 2018
