= Michele Amatore =

Captain in the Italian army (1826–1883)

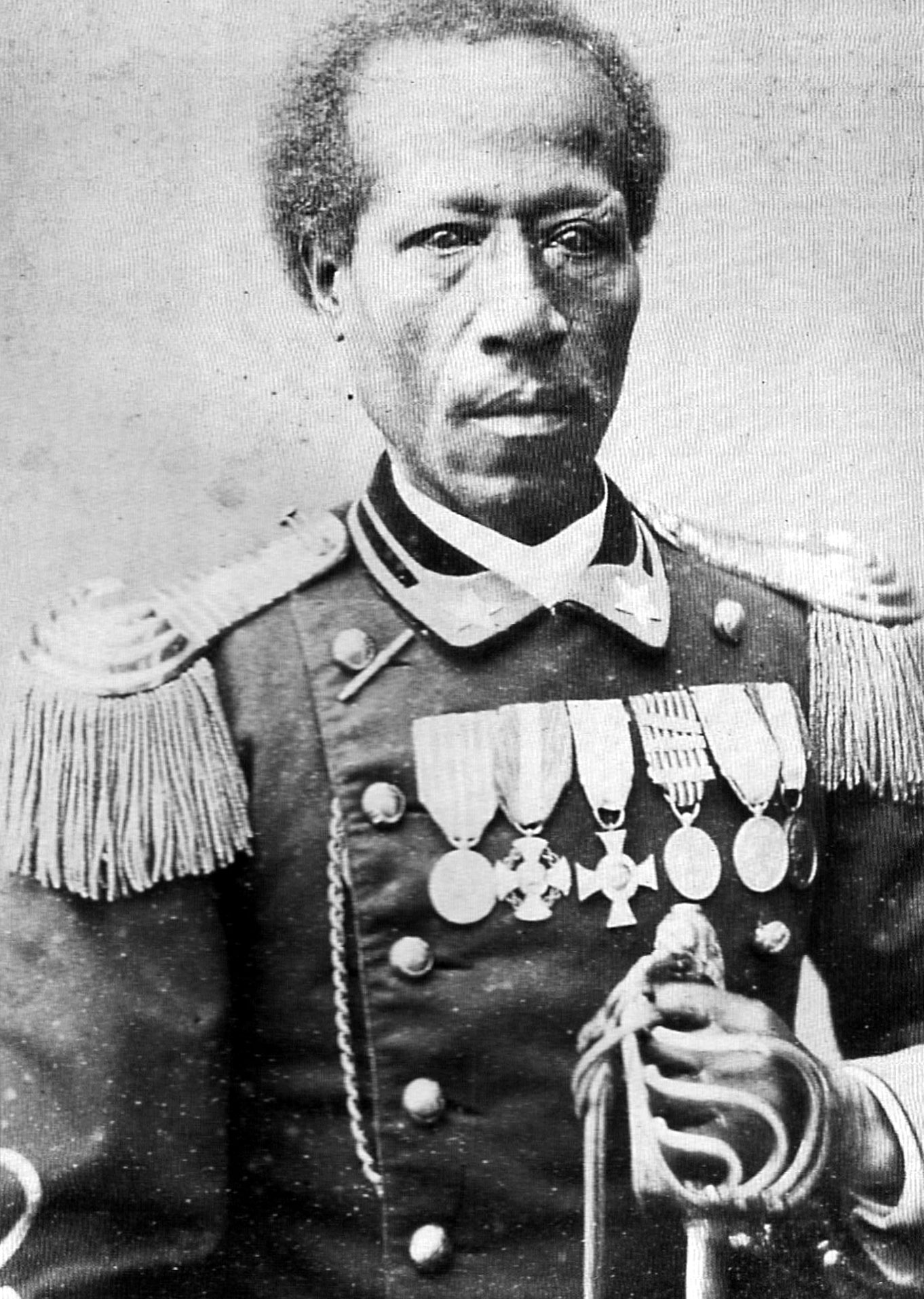
- Captain Michele Amatore
- Born: c. 1826; Nuba Mountains
- Died: 7 July 1883 (aged 56–57); Rosignano Monferrato

Captain Michele Amatore or Sulayman al-Nubi (c. 1826 – 7 July 1883) was a Sudanese ex-slave who became a captain in the Bersaglieri of the Italian army. He was decorated for unselfish acts during a cholera outbreak in Sicily.

== Biography ==
The early life of Amatore is mostly unknown. The name of Michele Amatore was not given when he was born (probably) in the Nuba Mountains of the Sudan. Later he came to be known as Sulayman al-Nubi. Much later in his life, Amatore said that he remembered that his father's name was Bolingia and that his name was Quetto. He recounted that he had been captured when Egyptian slave traders raided their family's village. They killed many old people and took away mostly women and children. Those captured were marched without food to Khartoum where a slave market was still acceptable.

Amatore first came to notice when he was bought as a slave by Luigi Castagnone, the physician employed by Mohammed Ali Pasha, when he was about six years old. In 1836 Castagnone, who had been sentenced for life in native Kingdom of Sardinia for patriotic riots, was eventually pardoned and they left for Italy, when the boy settled with a friend of the doctor, Maurizio Bussa, when Castagnone flew again. There he became a Christian on 10 June 1838, receiving sacraments by the Bishop of Asti Michele Amatore Lobetti, in homage to whom he took his name and the surname.

== Italy ==
Amatore established himself in present-day Italy and took on Sardinian nationality. He enrolled as a soldier and marksman in the specialised Bersaglieri regiment of the Piedmontese army in 1848, when Amatore would have been about eighteen. In 1848 and 1849 he and his regiment from northwest Italy were involved in a campaign against Austria during the first unrest that led to Italian unification. Ten years later he was again involved in a campaign against Austria; 1859 also saw him promoted to corporal. By 1863 he had attained the rank of captain. Amatore served with distinction during the cholera outbreak in Sicily and was decorated by King Victor Emmanuel II, the first King of Italy.

Amatore retired because of problems with his eyesight in 1880. He died at Rosignano Monferrato in the Piedmont region of northern Italy on 7 July 1883.
