= Lu, Piedmont =

Lu
- Comune
- Comune di Lu
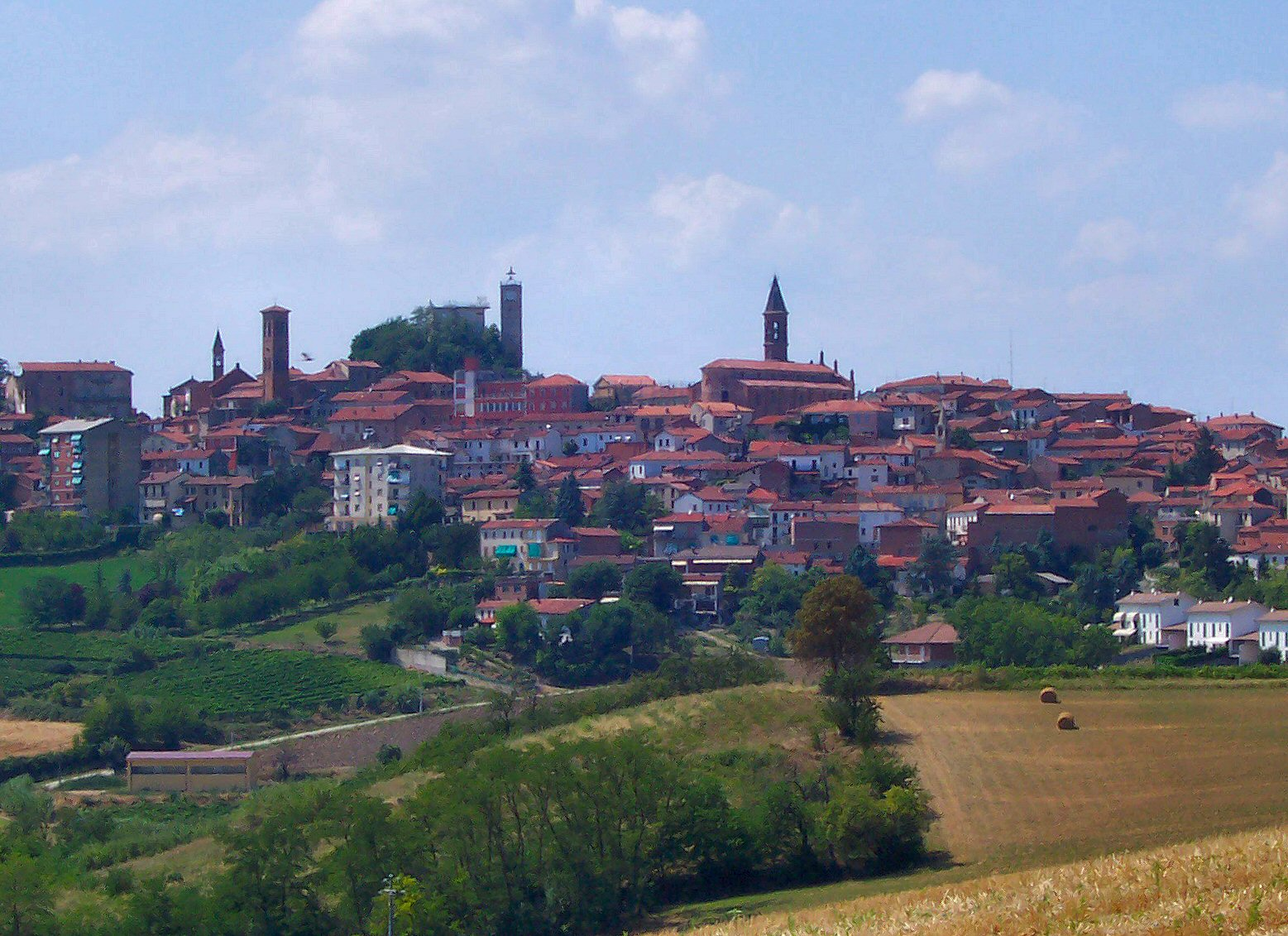

- Coat of arms

- Location within Italy Location within Piedmont
- Coordinates: 45°0′N 8°29′E
- Country: Italy
- Region: Piedmont
- Province: Alessandria (AL)
- Frazioni: Bodelacchi, Borghina, Castagna, Martini, Trisogli

Government
  - Mayor: Michele Filippo Fontefrancesco

Area
  - Total: 21.88 km^{2} (8.45 sq mi)
- Elevation: 307 m (1,007 ft)

Population (1-1-2017)
  - Total: 1,108
  - Density: 50.64/km^{2} (131.2/sq mi)
- Demonym: Luese(i)
- Time zone: UTC+1 (CET)
  - Summer (DST): UTC+2 (CEST)
- Postal code: 15040
- Dialing code: 0131
- Website: Official website

Lu (Italian: [ˈlu], Piedmontese: [ˈly]) is a comune (municipality) in the Province of Alessandria in the Italian region Piedmont, located about 60 kilometres (37 mi) east of Turin and about 14 kilometres (9 mi) northwest of Alessandria. In 2017 the population was 1,108 people.
