= Lu e Cuccaro Monferrato =

- Comune
- Comune di Lu e Cuccaro Monferrato
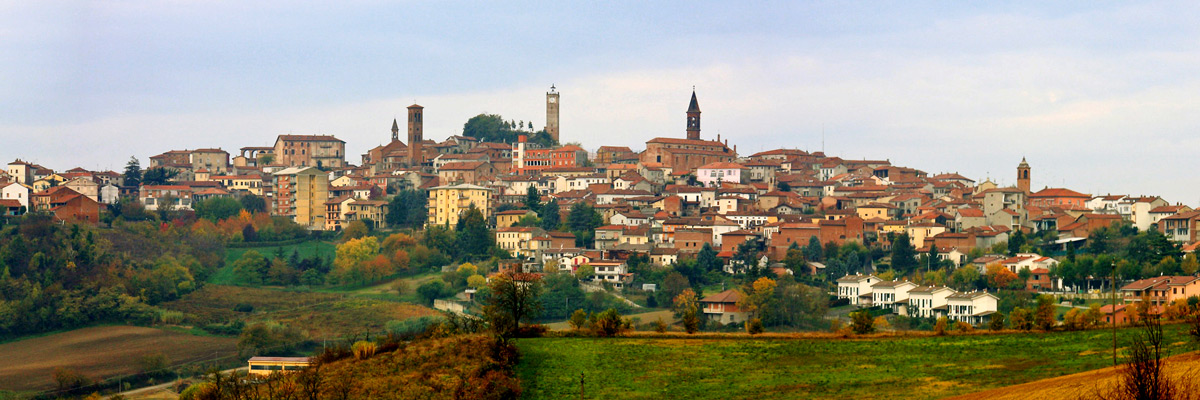

- Location within Italy Location within Piedmont
- Coordinates: 44°59′50″N 8°28′20″E
- Country: Italy
- Region: Piedmont
- Province: Alessandria (AL)
- Frazioni: Bodelacchi, Borghina, Castagna, Cuccaro Monferrato, Lu, Martini, Trisogli

Government
  - Mayor: Franco Alessio

Area
  - Total: 27.10 km^{2} (10.46 sq mi)

Population (30 November 2019)
  - Total: 1,373
  - Density: 50.66/km^{2} (131.2/sq mi)
- Time zone: UTC+1 (CET)
  - Summer (DST): UTC+2 (CEST)
- Postal code: 15037
- Dialing code: 0131
- Website: Official website

Lu e Cuccaro Monferrato is a comune (municipality) in the province of Alessandria, Piedmont, northern Italy. It was formed on 1 February 2019 by the merger of the previous comuni of Lu and Cuccaro Monferrato.
