= Alphabetical list of municipalities of Italy =

This is an alphabetical list of the 7,918 Italian municipalities (comuni). These represent the fundamental municipal units of the local government system of the country.

== A ==
- Abano Terme
- Abbadia Cerreto
- Abbadia Lariana
- Abbadia San Salvatore
- Abbasanta
- Abbateggio
- Abbiategrasso
- Abetone Cutigliano
- Abriola
- Acate
- Accadia
- Acceglio
- Accettura
- Acciano
- Accumoli
- Acerenza
- Acerno
- Acerra
- Aci Bonaccorsi
- Aci Castello
- Aci Catena
- Aci Sant'Antonio
- Acireale
- Acquafondata
- Acquaformosa
- Acquafredda
- Acqualagna
- Acquanegra Cremonese
- Acquanegra sul Chiese
- Acquapendente
- Acquappesa
- Acquaro
- Acquasanta Terme
- Acquasparta
- Acquaviva Collecroce
- Acquaviva delle Fonti
- Acquaviva d'Isernia
- Acquaviva Picena
- Acquaviva Platani
- Acquedolci
- Acqui Terme
- Acri
- Acuto
- Adelfia
- Adrano
- Adrara San Martino
- Adrara San Rocco
- Adria
- Adro
- Affi
- Affile
- Afragola
- Africo
- Agazzano
- Agerola
- Aggius
- Agira
- Agliana
- Agliano Terme
- Agliè
- Aglientu
- Agna
- Agnadello
- Agnana Calabra
- Agnone
- Agnosine
- Agordo
- Agosta
- Agra
- Agrate Brianza
- Agrate Conturbia
- Agrigento
- Agropoli
- Agugliano
- Agugliaro
- Ahrntal
- Aicurzio
- Aidomaggiore
- Aidone
- Aielli
- Aiello Calabro
- Aiello del Friuli
- Aiello del Sabato
- Aieta
- Ailano
- Ailoche
- Airasca
- Airola
- Airole
- Airuno
- Aisone
- Ala
- Alà dei Sardi
- Ala di Stura
- Alagna
- Alagna Valsesia
- Alanno
- Alassio
- Alatri
- Alba
- Alba Adriatica
- Albagiara
- Albairate
- Albanella
- Albano di Lucania
- Albano Laziale
- Albano Sant'Alessandro
- Albano Vercellese
- Albaredo d'Adige
- Albaredo per San Marco
- Albareto
- Albaretto della Torre
- Albavilla
- Albenga
- Albera Ligure
- Alberobello
- Alberona
- Albese con Cassano
- Albettone
- Albi
- Albiano
- Albiano d'Ivrea
- Albiate
- Albidona
- Albignasego
- Albinea
- Albino
- Albiolo
- Albisola Superiore
- Albissola Marina
- Albizzate
- Albonese
- Albosaggia
- Albugnano
- Albuzzano
- Alcamo
- Alcara li Fusi
- Aldein
- Aldeno
- Ales
- Alessandria
- Alessandria del Carretto
- Alessandria della Rocca
- Alessano
- Alezio
- Alfano
- Alfedena
- Alfianello
- Alfiano Natta
- Alfonsine
- Alghero
- Algua
- Algund
- Alì
- Alì Terme
- Alia
- Aliano
- Alice Bel Colle
- Alice Castello
- Alice Superiore
- Alife
- Alimena
- Aliminusa
- Allai
- Alleghe
- Allein
- Allerona
- Alliste
- Allumiere
- Alluvioni Cambiò
- Almè
- Almenno San Bartolomeo
- Almenno San Salvatore
- Almese
- Alonte
- Alpette
- Alpignano
- Alseno
- Alserio
- Altamura
- Altare
- Alta Val Tidone
- Altavilla Irpina
- Altavilla Milicia
- Altavilla Monferrato
- Altavilla Silentina
- Altavilla Vicentina
- Altidona
- Altilia
- Altino
- Altissimo
- Altivole
- Alto
- Altofonte
- Altomonte
- Altopascio
- Altrei
- Alviano
- Alvignano
- Alvito
- Alzano Lombardo
- Alzano Scrivia
- Alzate Brianza
- Amalfi
- Amandola
- Amantea
- Amaro
- Amaroni
- Amaseno
- Amato
- Amatrice
- Ambivere
- Amblar
- Ameglia
- Amelia
- Amendolara
- Ameno
- Amorosi
- Ampezzo
- Anacapri
- Anagni
- Ancarano
- Ancona
- Andali
- Andalo
- Andalo Valtellino
- Andezeno
- Andora
- Andorno Micca
- Andrano
- Andrate
- Andreis
- Andretta
- Andria
- Andrian
- Anela
- Anfo
- Angera
- Anghiari
- Angiari
- Angolo Terme
- Angri
- Angrogna
- Anguillara Sabazia
- Anguillara Veneta
- Annicco
- Annone di Brianza
- Annone Veneto
- Anoia
- Antegnate
- Antey-Saint-André
- Anticoli Corrado
- Antignano
- Antillo
- Antonimina
- Antrodoco
- Antrona Schieranco
- Anversa degli Abruzzi
- Anzano del Parco
- Anzano di Puglia
- Anzi
- Anzio
- Anzola dell'Emilia
- Anzola d'Ossola
- Aosta
- Apecchio
- Apice
- Apiro
- Apollosa
- Appiano Gentile
- Appignano
- Appignano del Tronto
- Aprica
- Apricale
- Apricena
- Aprigliano
- Aprilia
- Aquara
- Aquila d'Arroscia
- Aquileia
- Aquilonia
- Aquino
- Aradeo
- Aragona
- Aramengo
- Arba
- Arborea
- Arborio
- Arbus
- Arcade
- Arce
- Arcene
- Arcevia
- Archi
- Arcidosso
- Arcinazzo Romano
- Arcisate
- Arco
- Arcola
- Arcole
- Arconate
- Arcore
- Arcugnano
- Ardara
- Ardauli
- Ardea
- Ardenno
- Ardesio
- Ardore
- Arena
- Arena Po
- Arenzano
- Arese
- Arezzo
- Argegno
- Argelato
- Argenta
- Argentera
- Arguello
- Argusto
- Ari
- Ariano Irpino
- Ariano nel Polesine
- Ariccia
- Arielli
- Arienzo
- Arignano
- Aritzo
- Arizzano
- Arlena di Castro
- Arluno
- Armeno
- Armento
- Armo
- Armungia
- Arnad
- Arnara
- Arnasco
- Arnesano
- Arola
- Arona
- Arosio
- Arpaia
- Arpaise
- Arpino
- Arquà Petrarca
- Arquà Polesine
- Arquata del Tronto
- Arquata Scrivia
- Arre
- Arrone
- Arsago Seprio
- Arsiè
- Arsiero
- Arsita
- Arsoli
- Arta Terme
- Artegna
- Artena
- Artogne
- Arvier
- Arzachena
- Arzago d'Adda
- Arzana
- Arzano
- Arzene
- Arzergrande
- Arzignano
- Ascea
- Asciano
- Ascoli Piceno
- Ascoli Satriano
- Ascrea
- Asiago
- Asigliano Veneto
- Asigliano Vercellese
- Asola
- Asolo
- Assago
- Assemini
- Assisi
- Asso
- Assolo
- Assoro
- Asti
- Asuni
- Ateleta
- Atella
- Atena Lucana
- Atessa
- Atina
- Atrani
- Atri
- Atripalda
- Attigliano
- Attimis
- Atzara
- Auer
- Augusta
- Auletta
- Aulla
- Aurano
- Aurigo
- Auronzo di Cadore
- Ausonia
- Austis
- Avegno
- Avella
- Avellino
- Averara
- Aversa
- Avetrana
- Avezzano
- Aviano
- Aviatico
- Avigliana
- Avigliano
- Avigliano Umbro
- Avio
- Avise
- Avola
- Avolasca
- Ayas
- Aymavilles
- Azeglio
- Azzanello
- Azzano d'Asti
- Azzano Decimo
- Azzano Mella
- Azzano San Paolo
- Azzate
- Azzio
- Azzone

== B ==
- Baceno
- Bacoli
- Badalucco
- Badesi
- Badia
- Badia Calavena
- Badia Pavese
- Badia Polesine
- Badia Tedalda
- Badolato
- Bagaladi
- Bagheria
- Bagnacavallo
- Bagnara Calabra
- Bagnara di Romagna
- Bagnaria
- Bagnaria Arsa
- Bagnasco
- Bagnatica
- Bagni di Lucca
- Bagno a Ripoli
- Bagno di Romagna
- Bagnoli del Trigno
- Bagnoli di Sopra
- Bagnoli Irpino
- Bagnolo Cremasco
- Bagnolo del Salento
- Bagnolo di Po
- Bagnolo in Piano
- Bagnolo Mella
- Bagnolo Piemonte
- Bagnolo San Vito
- Bagnone
- Bagnoregio
- Bagolino
- Baia e Latina
- Baiano
- Bairo
- Baiso
- Bajardo
- Balangero
- Baldichieri d'Asti
- Baldissero Canavese
- Baldissero d'Alba
- Baldissero Torinese
- Balestrate
- Balestrino
- Ballabio
- Ballao
- Balme
- Balmuccia
- Balocco
- Balsorano
- Balvano
- Balzola
- Banari
- Banchette
- Bannio Anzino
- Banzi
- Baone
- Baradili
- Baragiano
- Baranello
- Barano d'Ischia
- Baranzate
- Barasso
- Baratili San Pietro
- Barbania
- Barbara
- Barbarano Romano
- Barbarano Vicentino
- Barbaresco
- Barbariga
- Barbata
- Barberino di Mugello
- Barberino Val d'Elsa
- Barbian
- Barbianello
- Barbona
- Barcellona Pozzo di Gotto
- Barchi
- Barcis
- Bard
- Bardello
- Bardi
- Bardineto
- Bardolino
- Bardonecchia
- Bareggio
- Barengo
- Baressa
- Barete
- Barga
- Bargagli
- Barge
- Barghe
- Bari
- Bari Sardo
- Bariano
- Baricella
- Barile
- Barisciano
- Barlassina
- Barletta
- Barni
- Barolo
- Barone Canavese
- Baronissi
- Barrafranca
- Barrali
- Barrea
- Barumini
- Barzago
- Barzana
- Barzanò
- Barzio
- Basaluzzo
- Bascapè
- Baschi
- Basciano
- Baselga di Pinè
- Baselice
- Basiano
- Basicò
- Basiglio
- Basiliano
- Bassano Bresciano
- Bassano del Grappa
- Bassano in Teverina
- Bassano Romano
- Bassiano
- Bassignana
- Bastia Mondovì
- Bastia Umbra
- Bastida Pancarana
- Bastiglia
- Battaglia Terme
- Battifollo
- Battipaglia
- Battuda
- Baucina
- Bauladu
- Baunei
- Baveno
- Bedero Valcuvia
- Bedizzole
- Bedollo
- Bedonia
- Bedulita
- Bee
- Beinasco
- Beinette
- Belcastro
- Belfiore
- Belforte all'Isauro
- Belforte del Chienti
- Belforte Monferrato
- Belgioioso
- Belgirate
- Bella
- Bellagio
- Bellano
- Bellante
- Bellaria-Igea Marina
- Bellegra
- Bellino
- Bellinzago Lombardo
- Bellinzago Novarese
- Bellizzi
- Bellona
- Bellosguardo
- Belluno
- Bellusco
- Belmonte Calabro
- Belmonte Castello
- Belmonte del Sannio
- Belmonte in Sabina
- Belmonte Mezzagno
- Belmonte Piceno
- Belpasso
- Belsito
- Belvedere di Spinello
- Belvedere Langhe
- Belvedere Marittimo
- Belvedere Ostrense
- Belveglio
- Belvì
- Bema
- Bene Lario
- Bene Vagienna
- Benestare
- Benetutti
- Benevello
- Benevento
- Benna
- Bentivoglio
- Berbenno
- Berbenno di Valtellina
- Berceto
- Berchidda
- Beregazzo con Figliaro
- Bereguardo
- Bergamasco
- Bergamo
- Bergantino
- Bergeggi
- Bergolo
- Berlingo
- Bernalda
- Bernareggio
- Bernate Ticino
- Bernezzo
- Berra
- Bersone
- Bertinoro
- Bertiolo
- Bertonico
- Berzano di San Pietro
- Berzano di Tortona
- Berzo Demo
- Berzo Inferiore
- Berzo San Fermo
- Besana in Brianza
- Besano
- Besate
- Besenello
- Besenzone
- Besnate
- Besozzo
- Bessude
- Bettola
- Bettona
- Beura-Cardezza
- Bevagna
- Beverino
- Bevilacqua
- Bezzecca
- Biancavilla
- Bianchi
- Bianco
- Biandrate
- Biandronno
- Bianzano
- Bianzè
- Bianzone
- Biassono
- Bibbiano
- Bibbiena
- Bibbona
- Bibiana
- Biccari
- Bicinicco
- Bidonì
- Biella
- Bienno
- Bieno
- Bientina
- Bigarello
- Binago
- Binasco
- Binetto
- Bioglio
- Bionaz
- Bione
- Birori
- Bisaccia
- Bisacquino
- Bisceglie
- Bisegna
- Bisenti
- Bisignano
- Bistagno
- Bisuschio
- Bitetto
- Bitonto
- Bitritto
- Bitti
- Bivona
- Bivongi
- Bizzarone
- Bleggio Inferiore
- Bleggio Superiore
- Blello
- Blera
- Blessagno
- Blevio
- Blufi
- Boara Pisani
- Bobbio
- Bobbio Pellice
- Boca
- Bocchigliero
- Boccioleto
- Bocenago
- Bodio Lomnago
- Boffalora d'Adda
- Boffalora sopra Ticino
- Bogliasco
- Bognanco
- Bogogno
- Boissano
- Bojano
- Bolano
- Bolbeno
- Bolgare
- Bollate
- Bollengo
- Bologna
- Bolognano
- Bolognetta
- Bolognola
- Bolotana
- Bolsena
- Boltiere
- Bolzano
- Bolzano Novarese
- Bolzano Vicentino
- Bomarzo
- Bomba
- Bompensiere
- Bompietro
- Bomporto
- Bonarcado
- Bonassola
- Bonate Sopra
- Bonate Sotto
- Bonavigo
- Bondeno
- Bondo
- Bondone
- Bonea
- Bonefro
- Bonemerse
- Bonifati
- Bonito
- Bonnanaro
- Bono
- Bonorva
- Bonvicino
- Borbona
- Borca di Cadore
- Bordano
- Bordighera
- Bordolano
- Bore
- Boretto
- Borgarello
- Borgaro Torinese
- Borgetto
- Borghetto d'Arroscia
- Borghetto di Borbera
- Borghetto di Vara
- Borghetto Lodigiano
- Borghetto Santo Spirito
- Borghi
- Borgia
- Borgiallo
- Borgio Verezzi
- Borgo a Mozzano
- Borgo d'Ale
- Borgo di Terzo
- Borgo Pace
- Borgo Priolo
- Borgo San Dalmazzo
- Borgo San Giacomo
- Borgo San Giovanni
- Borgo San Lorenzo
- Borgo San Martino
- Borgo San Siro
- Borgo Ticino
- Borgo Tossignano
- Borgo Val di Taro
- Borgo Valsugana
- Borgo Velino
- Borgo Vercelli
- Borgoforte
- Borgofranco d'Ivrea
- Borgofranco sul Po
- Borgolavezzaro
- Borgomale
- Borgomanero
- Borgomaro
- Borgomasino
- Borgone Susa
- Borgonovo Val Tidone
- Borgoratto Alessandrino
- Borgoratto Mormorolo
- Borgoricco
- Borgorose
- Borgosatollo
- Borgosesia
- Bormida
- Bormio
- Bornasco
- Borno
- Boroneddu
- Borore
- Borrello
- Borriana
- Borso del Grappa
- Bortigali
- Bortigiadas
- Borutta
- Borzonasca
- Bosa
- Bosaro
- Boschi Sant'Anna
- Bosco Chiesanuova
- Bosco Marengo
- Bosconero
- Boscoreale
- Boscotrecase
- Bosentino
- Bosia
- Bosio
- Bosisio Parini
- Bosnasco
- Bossico
- Bossolasco
- Botricello
- Botrugno
- Bottanuco
- Botticino
- Bottidda
- Bova
- Bova Marina
- Bovalino
- Bovegno
- Boves
- Bovezzo
- Boville Ernica
- Bovino
- Bovisio-Masciago
- Bovolenta
- Bovolone
- Bozzole
- Bozzolo
- Bra
- Bracca
- Bracciano
- Bracigliano
- Brallo di Pregola
- Brancaleone
- Brandico
- Brandizzo
- Branzi
- Braone
- Brebbia
- Breda di Piave
- Bregano
- Breganze
- Bregnano
- Breguzzo
- Breia
- Brembate
- Brembate di Sopra
- Brembilla
- Brembio
- Breme
- Brendola
- Brenna
- Brenner
- Breno
- Brenta
- Brentino Belluno
- Brentonico
- Brenzone
- Brescello
- Brescia
- Bresimo
- Bressana Bottarone
- Bressanvido
- Bresso
- Brez
- Brezzo di Bedero
- Briaglia
- Briatico
- Bricherasio
- Brienno
- Brienza
- Briga Alta
- Briga Novarese
- Brignano Gera d'Adda
- Brignano-Frascata
- Brindisi
- Brindisi Montagna
- Brinzio
- Briona
- Brione (Province of Brescia)
- Brione (Province of Trento)
- Briosco
- Brisighella
- Brissago-Valtravaglia
- Brissogne
- Brittoli
- Brivio
- Brixen
- Broccostella
- Brogliano
- Brognaturo
- Brolo
- Brondello
- Broni
- Bronte
- Bronzolo
- Brossasco
- Brosso
- Brovello-Carpugnino
- Brozolo
- Brugherio
- Brugine
- Brugnato
- Brugnera
- Bruino
- Brumano
- Brunate
- Bruneck
- Brunello
- Bruno
- Brusaporto
- Brusasco
- Brusciano
- Brusimpiano
- Brusnengo
- Brusson
- Bruzolo
- Bruzzano Zeffirio
- Bubbiano
- Bubbio
- Buccheri
- Bucchianico
- Bucciano
- Buccinasco
- Buccino
- Bucine
- Buddusò
- Budoia
- Budoni
- Budrio
- Buggerru
- Buggiano
- Buglio in Monte
- Bugnara
- Buguggiate
- Buja
- Bulciago
- Bulgarograsso
- Bultei
- Bulzi
- Buonabitacolo
- Buonalbergo
- Buonconvento
- Buonvicino
- Burago di Molgora
- Burcei
- Burgio
- Burgos
- Burgstall
- Buriasco
- Burolo
- Buronzo
- Busachi
- Busalla
- Busana
- Busano
- Busca
- Buscate
- Buscemi
- Buseto Palizzolo
- Busnago
- Bussero
- Busseto
- Bussi sul Tirino
- Busso
- Bussolengo
- Bussoleno
- Busto Arsizio
- Busto Garolfo
- Butera
- Buti
- Buttapietra
- Buttigliera Alta
- Buttigliera d'Asti
- Buttrio

== C ==
- Ca' d'Andrea
- Cabella Ligure
- Cabiate
- Cabras
- Caccamo
- Caccuri
- Cadegliano-Viconago
- Cadelbosco di Sopra
- Cadeo
- Caderzone
- Cadoneghe
- Cadorago
- Cadrezzate
- Caerano di San Marco
- Cafasse
- Caggiano
- Cagli
- Cagliari
- Caglio
- Cagnano Amiterno
- Cagnano Varano
- Cagno
- Cagnò
- Caianello
- Caiazzo
- Caino
- Caiolo
- Cairano
- Cairate
- Cairo Montenotte
- Caivano
- Calabritto
- Calalzo di Cadore
- Calamandrana
- Calamonaci
- Calangianus
- Calanna
- Calasca-Castiglione
- Calascibetta
- Calascio
- Calasetta
- Calatabiano
- Calatafimi-Segesta
- Calavino
- Calcata
- Calceranica al Lago
- Calci
- Calciano
- Calcinaia
- Calcinate
- Calcinato
- Calcio
- Calco
- Caldarola
- Calderara di Reno
- Caldes
- Caldiero
- Caldogno
- Caldonazzo
- Calendasco
- Calenzano
- Calestano
- Calice al Cornoviglio
- Calice Ligure
- Calimera
- Calitri
- Calizzano
- Callabiana
- Calliano (Province of Asti)
- Calliano (Province of Trento)
- Calolziocorte
- Calopezzati
- Calosso
- Caloveto
- Caltabellotta
- Caltagirone
- Caltanissetta
- Caltavuturo
- Caltignaga
- Calto
- Caltrano
- Calusco d'Adda
- Caluso
- Calvagese della Riviera
- Calvanico
- Calvatone
- Calvello
- Calvene
- Calvenzano
- Calvera
- Calvi
- Calvi dell'Umbria
- Calvi Risorta
- Calvignano
- Calvignasco
- Calvisano
- Calvizzano
- Camagna Monferrato
- Camaiore
- Camairago
- Camandona
- Camastra
- Cambiago
- Cambiano
- Cambiasca
- Camburzano
- Camerana
- Camerano
- Camerano Casasco
- Camerata Cornello
- Camerata Nuova
- Camerata Picena
- Cameri
- Camerino
- Camerota
- Camigliano
- Camini
- Camino
- Camino al Tagliamento
- Camisano
- Camisano Vicentino
- Cammarata
- Camo
- Camogli
- Campagna
- Campagna Lupia
- Campagnano di Roma
- Campagnatico
- Campagnola Cremasca
- Campagnola Emilia
- Campana
- Camparada
- Campegine
- Campello sul Clitunno
- Campertogno
- Campi Bisenzio
- Campi Salentina
- Campiglia Cervo
- Campiglia dei Berici
- Campiglia Marittima
- Campiglione-Fenile
- Campione d'Italia
- Campitello di Fassa
- Campli
- Campo Calabro
- Campo di Giove
- Campo Ligure
- Campo nell'Elba
- Campo San Martino
- Campobasso
- Campobello di Licata
- Campobello di Mazara
- Campochiaro
- Campodarsego
- Campodenno
- Campodimele
- Campodipietra
- Campodolcino
- Campodoro
- Campofelice di Fitalia
- Campofelice di Roccella
- Campofilone
- Campofiorito
- Campoformido
- Campofranco
- Campogalliano
- Campolattaro
- Campoli Appennino
- Campoli del Monte Taburno
- Campolieto
- Campolongo Maggiore
- Campolongo sul Brenta
- Campolongo Tapogliano
- Campomaggiore
- Campomarino
- Campomorone
- Camponogara
- Campora
- Camporeale
- Camporgiano
- Camporosso
- Camporotondo di Fiastrone
- Camporotondo Etneo
- Camposampiero
- Camposano
- Camposanto
- Campospinoso
- Campotosto
- Camugnano
- Canal San Bovo
- Canale
- Canale d'Agordo
- Canale Monterano
- Canaro
- Canazei
- Cancellara
- Cancello e Arnone
- Canda
- Candela
- Candelo
- Candia Canavese
- Candia Lomellina
- Candiana
- Candida
- Candidoni
- Candiolo
- Canegrate
- Canelli
- Canepina
- Caneva
- Canevino
- Canicattì
- Canicattini Bagni
- Canino
- Canischio
- Canistro
- Canna
- Cannalonga
- Cannara
- Cannero Riviera
- Canneto Pavese
- Canneto sull'Oglio
- Cannobio
- Cannole
- Canolo
- Canonica d'Adda
- Canosa di Puglia
- Canosa Sannita
- Canosio
- Canossa
- Cansano
- Cantagallo
- Cantalice
- Cantalupa
- Cantalupo in Sabina
- Cantalupo Ligure
- Cantalupo nel Sannio
- Cantarana
- Cantello
- Canterano
- Cantiano
- Cantoira
- Cantù
- Canzano
- Canzo
- Caorle
- Caorso
- Capaccio
- Capaci
- Capalbio
- Capannoli
- Capannori
- Capena
- Capergnanica
- Capestrano
- Capiago Intimiano
- Capistrano
- Capistrello
- Capitignano
- Capizzi
- Capizzone
- Capo di Ponte
- Capo d'Orlando
- Capodimonte
- Capodrise
- Capoliveri
- Capolona
- Caponago
- Caporciano
- Caposele
- Capoterra
- Capovalle
- Cappadocia
- Cappella Cantone
- Cappella de' Picenardi
- Cappella Maggiore
- Cappelle sul Tavo
- Capracotta
- Capraia
- Capraia e Limite
- Capralba
- Capranica
- Capranica Prenestina
- Caprarica di Lecce
- Caprarola
- Caprauna
- Caprese Michelangelo
- Caprezzo
- Capri
- Capri Leone
- Capriana
- Capriano del Colle
- Capriata d'Orba
- Capriate San Gervasio
- Capriati a Volturno
- Caprie
- Capriglia Irpina
- Capriglio
- Caprile
- Caprino Bergamasco
- Caprino Veronese
- Capriolo
- Capriva del Friuli
- Capua
- Capurso
- Caraffa del Bianco
- Caraffa di Catanzaro
- Caraglio
- Caramagna Piemonte
- Caramanico Terme
- Carapelle
- Carapelle Calvisio
- Carasco
- Carassai
- Carate Brianza
- Carate Urio
- Caravaggio
- Caravate
- Caravino
- Caravonica
- Carbognano
- Carbonara al Ticino
- Carbonara di Nola
- Carbonara di Po
- Carbonara Scrivia
- Carbonate
- Carbone
- Carbonera
- Carbonia
- Carcare
- Carceri
- Carcoforo
- Cardano al Campo
- Cardè
- Cardedu
- Cardeto
- Cardinale
- Cardito
- Careggine
- Carema
- Carenno
- Carentino
- Careri
- Caresana
- Caresanablot
- Carezzano
- Carfizzi
- Cargeghe
- Cariati
- Carife
- Carignano
- Carimate
- Carinaro
- Carini
- Carinola
- Carisio
- Carisolo
- Carlantino
- Carlazzo
- Carlentini
- Carlino
- Carloforte
- Carlopoli
- Carmagnola
- Carmiano
- Carmignano
- Carmignano di Brenta
- Carnago
- Carnate
- Carobbio degli Angeli
- Carolei
- Carona
- Caronia
- Caronno Pertusella
- Caronno Varesino
- Carosino
- Carovigno
- Carovilli
- Carpaneto Piacentino
- Carpanzano
- Carpasio
- Carpegna
- Carpenedolo
- Carpeneto
- Carpi
- Carpiano
- Carpignano Salentino
- Carpignano Sesia
- Carpineti
- Carpineto della Nora
- Carpineto Romano
- Carpineto Sinello
- Carpino
- Carpinone
- Carrara
- Carrè
- Carrega Ligure
- Carro
- Carrodano
- Carrosio
- Carrù
- Carsoli
- Cartigliano
- Cartignano
- Cartoceto
- Cartosio
- Cartura
- Carugate
- Carugo
- Carunchio
- Carvico
- Carzano
- Casabona
- Casacalenda
- Casacanditella
- Casagiove
- Casal Cermelli
- Casal di Principe
- Casal Velino
- Casalanguida
- Casalattico
- Casalbeltrame
- Casalbordino
- Casalbore
- Casalborgone
- Casalbuono
- Casalbuttano ed Uniti
- Casalciprano
- Casalduni
- Casale Corte Cerro
- Casale Cremasco-Vidolasco
- Casale di Scodosia
- Casale Litta
- Casale Marittimo
- Casale Monferrato
- Casale sul Sile
- Casalecchio di Reno
- Casaleggio Boiro
- Casaleggio Novara
- Casaleone
- Casaletto Ceredano
- Casaletto di Sopra
- Casaletto Lodigiano
- Casaletto Spartano
- Casaletto Vaprio
- Casalfiumanese
- Casalgrande
- Casalgrasso
- Casalincontrada
- Casalino
- Casalmaggiore
- Casalmaiocco
- Casalmorano
- Casalmoro
- Casalnoceto
- Casalnuovo di Napoli
- Casalnuovo Monterotaro
- Casaloldo
- Casalpusterlengo
- Casalromano
- Casalserugo
- Casaluce
- Casalvecchio di Puglia
- Casalvecchio Siculo
- Casalvieri
- Casalvolone
- Casalzuigno
- Casamarciano
- Casamassima
- Casamicciola Terme
- Casandrino
- Casanova Elvo
- Casanova Lerrone
- Casanova Lonati
- Casape
- Casapesenna
- Casapinta
- Casaprota
- Casapulla
- Casarano
- Casargo
- Casarile
- Casarsa della Delizia
- Casarza Ligure
- Casasco
- Casasco d'Intelvi
- Casatenovo
- Casatisma
- Casavatore
- Casazza
- Cascia
- Casciago
- Casciana Terme
- Cascina
- Cascinette d'Ivrea
- Casei Gerola
- Caselette
- Casella
- Caselle in Pittari
- Caselle Landi
- Caselle Lurani
- Caselle Torinese
- Caserta
- Casier
- Casignana
- Casina
- Casirate d'Adda
- Caslino d'Erba
- Casnate con Bernate
- Casnigo
- Casola di Napoli
- Casola in Lunigiana
- Casola Valsenio
- Casole Bruzio
- Casole d'Elsa
- Casoli
- Casorate Primo
- Casorate Sempione
- Casorezzo
- Casoria
- Casorzo
- Casperia
- Caspoggio
- Cassacco
- Cassago Brianza
- Cassano allo Ionio
- Cassano d'Adda
- Cassano delle Murge
- Cassano Irpino
- Cassano Magnago
- Cassano Spinola
- Cassano Valcuvia
- Cassaro
- Cassiglio
- Cassina de' Pecchi
- Cassina Rizzardi
- Cassina Valsassina
- Cassinasco
- Cassine
- Cassinelle
- Cassinetta di Lugagnano
- Cassino
- Cassola
- Cassolnovo
- Castagnaro
- Castagneto Carducci
- Castagneto Po
- Castagnito
- Castagnole delle Lanze
- Castagnole Monferrato
- Castagnole Piemonte
- Castana
- Castano Primo
- Casteggio
- Castegnato
- Castegnero
- Castel Baronia
- Castel Boglione
- Castel Bolognese
- Castel Campagnano
- Castel Castagna
- Castel Colonna
- Castel Condino
- Castel d'Aiano
- Castel d'Ario
- Castel d'Azzano
- Castel del Giudice
- Castel del Monte
- Castel del Piano
- Castel del Rio
- Castel di Casio
- Castel di Ieri
- Castel di Judica
- Castel di Lama
- Castel di Lucio
- Castel di Sangro
- Castel di Sasso
- Castel di Tora
- Castel Focognano
- Castel Frentano
- Castel Gabbiano
- Castel Gandolfo
- Castel Giorgio
- Castel Goffredo
- Castel Guelfo di Bologna
- Castel Madama
- Castel Maggiore
- Castel Mella
- Castel Morrone
- Castel Ritaldi
- Castel Rocchero
- Castel Rozzone
- Castel San Giorgio
- Castel San Giovanni
- Castel San Lorenzo
- Castel San Niccolò
- Castel San Pietro Romano
- Castel San Pietro Terme
- Castel San Vincenzo
- Castel Sant'Angelo
- Castel Sant'Elia
- Castel Viscardo
- Castel Vittorio
- Castel Volturno
- Castelbaldo
- Castelbelforte
- Castelbellino
- Castelbianco
- Castelbottaccio
- Castelbuono
- Castelcivita
- Castelcovati
- Castelcucco
- Casteldaccia
- Casteldelci
- Casteldelfino
- Casteldidone
- Castelfidardo
- Castelfiorentino
- Castelfondo
- Castelforte
- Castelfranci
- Castelfranco di Sopra
- Castelfranco di Sotto
- Castelfranco Emilia
- Castelfranco in Miscano
- Castelfranco Veneto
- Castelgomberto
- Castelgrande
- Castelguglielmo
- Castelguidone
- Castellabate
- Castellafiume
- Castell'Alfero
- Castellalto
- Castellammare del Golfo
- Castellammare di Stabia
- Castellamonte
- Castellana Grotte
- Castellana Sicula
- Castellaneta
- Castellania
- Castellanza
- Castellar
- Castellar Guidobono
- Castellarano
- Castellaro
- Castell'Arquato
- Castellavazzo
- Castell'Azzara
- Castellazzo Bormida
- Castellazzo Novarese
- Castelleone
- Castelleone di Suasa
- Castellero
- Castelletto Cervo
- Castelletto d'Erro
- Castelletto di Branduzzo
- Castelletto d'Orba
- Castelletto Merli
- Castelletto Molina
- Castelletto Monferrato
- Castelletto sopra Ticino
- Castelletto Stura
- Castelletto Uzzone
- Castelli
- Castelli Calepio
- Castellina in Chianti
- Castellina Marittima
- Castellinaldo
- Castellino del Biferno
- Castellino Tanaro
- Castelliri
- Castello Cabiaglio
- Castello d'Agogna
- Castello d'Argile
- Castello del Matese
- Castello dell'Acqua
- Castello di Annone
- Castello di Brianza
- Castello di Cisterna
- Castello di Godego
- Castello di Serravalle
- Castello Tesino
- Castello-Molina di Fiemme
- Castellucchio
- Castelluccio dei Sauri
- Castelluccio Inferiore
- Castelluccio Superiore
- Castelluccio Valmaggiore
- Castell'Umberto
- Castelmagno
- Castelmarte
- Castelmassa
- Castelmauro
- Castelmezzano
- Castelmola
- Castelnovetto
- Castelnovo Bariano
- Castelnovo del Friuli
- Castelnovo di Sotto
- Castelnovo ne' Monti
- Castelnuovo
- Castelnuovo Belbo
- Castelnuovo Berardenga
- Castelnuovo Bocca d'Adda
- Castelnuovo Bormida
- Castelnuovo Bozzente
- Castelnuovo Calcea
- Castelnuovo Cilento
- Castelnuovo del Garda
- Castelnuovo della Daunia
- Castelnuovo di Ceva
- Castelnuovo di Conza
- Castelnuovo di Farfa
- Castelnuovo di Garfagnana
- Castelnuovo di Porto
- Castelnuovo di Val di Cecina
- Castelnuovo Don Bosco
- Castelnuovo Magra
- Castelnuovo Nigra
- Castelnuovo Parano
- Castelnuovo Rangone
- Castelnuovo Scrivia
- Castelpagano
- Castelpetroso
- Castelpizzuto
- Castelplanio
- Castelpoto
- Castelraimondo
- Castelsantangelo sul Nera
- Castelsaraceno
- Castelsardo
- Castelseprio
- Castelsilano
- Castelspina
- Casteltermini
- Castelveccana
- Castelvecchio Calvisio
- Castelvecchio di Rocca Barbena
- Castelvecchio Subequo
- Castelvenere
- Castelverde
- Castelverrino
- Castelvetere in Val Fortore
- Castelvetere sul Calore
- Castelvetrano
- Castelvetro di Modena
- Castelvetro Piacentino
- Castelvisconti
- Castenaso
- Castenedolo
- Castiadas
- Castiglion Fibocchi
- Castiglion Fiorentino
- Castiglione a Casauria
- Castiglione Chiavarese
- Castiglione Cosentino
- Castiglione d'Adda
- Castiglione dei Pepoli
- Castiglione del Genovesi
- Castiglione del Lago
- Castiglione della Pescaia
- Castiglione delle Stiviere
- Castiglione di Garfagnana
- Castiglione di Sicilia
- Castiglione d'Intelvi
- Castiglione d'Orcia
- Castiglione Falletto
- Castiglione in Teverina
- Castiglione Messer Marino
- Castiglione Messer Raimondo
- Castiglione Olona
- Castiglione Tinella
- Castiglione Torinese
- Castignano
- Castilenti
- Castino
- Castione Andevenno
- Castione della Presolana
- Castions di Strada
- Castiraga Vidardo
- Casto
- Castorano
- Castrezzato
- Castri di Lecce
- Castrignano de' Greci
- Castrignano del Capo
- Castro (Province of Bergamo)
- Castro (Province of Lecce)
- Castro dei Volsci
- Castrocaro Terme e Terra del Sole
- Castrocielo
- Castrofilippo
- Castrolibero
- Castronno
- Castronovo di Sicilia
- Castronuovo di Sant'Andrea
- Castropignano
- Castroreale
- Castroregio
- Castrovillari
- Catania
- Catanzaro
- Catenanuova
- Catignano
- Cattolica
- Cattolica Eraclea
- Caulonia
- Cautano
- Cava de' Tirreni
- Cava Manara
- Cavacurta
- Cavaglià
- Cavaglietto
- Cavaglio d'Agogna
- Cavagnolo
- Cavaion Veronese
- Cavalese
- Cavallasca
- Cavallerleone
- Cavallermaggiore
- Cavallino
- Cavallino-Treporti
- Cavallirio
- Cavareno
- Cavargna
- Cavaria con Premezzo
- Cavarzere
- Cavaso del Tomba
- Cavasso Nuovo
- Cavatore
- Cavazzo Carnico
- Cave
- Cavedago
- Cavedine
- Cavenago d'Adda
- Cavenago di Brianza
- Cavernago
- Cavezzo
- Cavizzana
- Cavour
- Cavriago
- Cavriana
- Cavriglia
- Cazzago Brabbia
- Cazzago San Martino
- Cazzano di Tramigna
- Cazzano Sant'Andrea
- Ceccano
- Cecima
- Cecina
- Cedegolo
- Cedrasco
- Cefalà Diana
- Cefalù
- Ceggia
- Ceglie Messapica
- Celano
- Celenza sul Trigno
- Celenza Valfortore
- Celico
- Cella Dati
- Cella Monte
- Cellamare
- Cellara
- Cellarengo
- Cellatica
- Celle di Bulgheria
- Celle di Macra
- Celle di San Vito
- Celle Enomondo
- Celle Ligure
- Celleno
- Cellere
- Cellino Attanasio
- Cellino San Marco
- Cellio
- Cellole
- Cembra Lisignago
- Cenadi
- Cenate Sopra
- Cenate Sotto
- Cencenighe Agordino
- Cene
- Ceneselli
- Cengio
- Centa San Nicolò
- Centallo
- Cento
- Centola
- Centrache
- Centuripe
- Cepagatti
- Ceppaloni
- Ceppo Morelli
- Ceprano
- Cerami
- Ceranesi
- Cerano
- Cerano d'Intelvi
- Ceranova
- Ceraso
- Cercemaggiore
- Cercenasco
- Cercepiccola
- Cerchiara di Calabria
- Cerchio
- Cercino
- Cercivento
- Cercola
- Cerda
- Cerea
- Ceregnano
- Cerenzia
- Ceres
- Ceresara
- Cereseto
- Ceresole Alba
- Ceresole Reale
- Cerete
- Ceretto Lomellina
- Cergnago
- Ceriale
- Ceriana
- Ceriano Laghetto
- Cerignale
- Cerignola
- Cerisano
- Cermenate
- Cermignano
- Cernobbio
- Cernusco Lombardone
- Cernusco sul Naviglio
- Cerreto Castello
- Cerreto d'Asti
- Cerreto d'Esi
- Cerreto di Spoleto
- Cerreto Grue
- Cerreto Guidi
- Cerreto Laziale
- Cerreto Sannita
- Cerretto Langhe
- Cerrina Monferrato
- Cerrione
- Cerro al Lambro
- Cerro al Volturno
- Cerro Maggiore
- Cerro Tanaro
- Cerro Veronese
- Cersosimo
- Certaldo
- Certosa di Pavia
- Cerva
- Cervara di Roma
- Cervarese Santa Croce
- Cervaro
- Cervasca
- Cervatto
- Cerveno
- Cervere
- Cervesina
- Cerveteri
- Cervia
- Cervicati
- Cervignano d'Adda
- Cervignano del Friuli
- Cervinara
- Cervino
- Cervo
- Cerzeto
- Cesa
- Cesana Brianza
- Cesana Torinese
- Cesano Boscone
- Cesano Maderno
- Cesara
- Cesarò
- Cesate
- Cesena
- Cesenatico
- Cesinali
- Cesio
- Cesiomaggiore
- Cessalto
- Cessaniti
- Cessapalombo
- Cessole
- Cetara
- Ceto
- Cetona
- Cetraro
- Ceva
- Cevo
- Challand-Saint-Anselme
- Challand-Saint-Victor
- Chambave
- Chamois
- Champdepraz
- Champorcher
- Charvensod
- Châtillon
- Cherasco
- Cheremule
- Chialamberto
- Chiampo
- Chianche
- Chianciano Terme
- Chianni
- Chianocco
- Chiaramonte Gulfi
- Chiaramonti
- Chiarano
- Chiaravalle
- Chiaravalle Centrale
- Chiari
- Chiaromonte
- Chiauci
- Chiavari
- Chiavenna
- Chiaverano
- Chieri
- Chies d'Alpago
- Chiesa in Valmalenco
- Chiesanuova
- Chiesina Uzzanese
- Chieti
- Chieuti
- Chieve
- Chignolo d'Isola
- Chignolo Po
- Chioggia
- Chiomonte
- Chions
- Chiopris-Viscone
- Chitignano
- Chiuduno
- Chiuppano
- Chiuro
- Chiusa di Pesio
- Chiusa di San Michele
- Chiusa Sclafani
- Chiusaforte
- Chiusanico
- Chiusano d'Asti
- Chiusano di San Domenico
- Chiusavecchia
- Chiusdino
- Chiusi
- Chiusi della Verna
- Chivasso
- Ciampino
- Cianciana
- Cibiana di Cadore
- Cicagna
- Cicala
- Cicciano
- Cicerale
- Ciciliano
- Cicognolo
- Ciconio
- Cigliano
- Cigliè
- Cigognola
- Cigole
- Cilavegna
- Cimadolmo
- Cimbergo
- Cimego
- Ciminà
- Ciminna
- Cimitile
- Cimolais
- Cimone
- Cinaglio
- Cineto Romano
- Cingia de' Botti
- Cingoli
- Cinigiano
- Cinisello Balsamo
- Cinisi
- Cino
- Cinquefrondi
- Cintano
- Cinte Tesino
- Cinto Caomaggiore
- Cinto Euganeo
- Cinzano
- Ciorlano
- Cipressa
- Circello
- Cirié
- Cirigliano
- Cirimido
- Cirò
- Cirò Marina
- Cis
- Cisano Bergamasco
- Cisano sul Neva
- Ciserano
- Cislago
- Cisliano
- Cismon del Grappa
- Cison di Valmarino
- Cissone
- Cisterna d'Asti
- Cisterna di Latina
- Cisternino
- Citerna
- Città della Pieve
- Città di Castello
- Città Sant'Angelo
- Cittadella
- Cittaducale
- Cittanova
- Cittareale
- Cittiglio
- Civate
- Civenna
- Civezza
- Civezzano
- Civiasco
- Cividale del Friuli
- Cividate al Piano
- Cividate Camuno
- Civita
- Civita Castellana
- Civita d'Antino
- Civitacampomarano
- Civitaluparella
- Civitanova del Sannio
- Civitanova Marche
- Civitaquana
- Civitavecchia
- Civitella Alfedena
- Civitella Casanova
- Civitella d'Agliano
- Civitella del Tronto
- Civitella di Romagna
- Civitella in Val di Chiana
- Civitella Messer Raimondo
- Civitella Paganico
- Civitella Roveto
- Civitella San Paolo
- Civo
- Claino con Osteno
- Claut
- Clauzetto
- Clavesana
- Claviere
- Cles
- Cleto
- Clivio
- Cloz
- Clusone
- Coassolo Torinese
- Coazze
- Coazzolo
- Coccaglio
- Cocconato
- Cocquio-Trevisago
- Cocullo
- Codevigo
- Codevilla
- Codigoro
- Codognè
- Codogno
- Codroipo
- Codrongianos
- Coggiola
- Cogliate
- Cogne
- Cogoleto
- Cogollo del Cengio
- Cogorno
- Colazza
- Colbordolo
- Colere
- Colfelice
- Coli
- Colico
- Collagna
- Collalto Sabino
- Collarmele
- Collazzone
- Colle Brianza
- Colle d'Anchise
- Colle di Tora
- Colle di Val d'Elsa
- Colle San Magno
- Colle Sannita
- Colle Santa Lucia
- Colle Umberto
- Collebeato
- Collecchio
- Collecorvino
- Colledara
- Colledimacine
- Colledimezzo
- Colleferro
- Collegiove
- Collegno
- Collelongo
- Collepardo
- Collepasso
- Collepietro
- Colleretto Castelnuovo
- Colleretto Giacosa
- Collesalvetti
- Collesano
- Colletorto
- Collevecchio
- Colli a Volturno
- Colli del Tronto
- Colli sul Velino
- Colliano
- Collinas
- Collio
- Collobiano
- Colloredo di Monte Albano
- Colmurano
- Colobraro
- Cologna Veneta
- Cologne
- Cologno al Serio
- Cologno Monzese
- Colognola ai Colli
- Colonna
- Colonnella
- Colonno
- Colorina
- Colorno
- Colosimi
- Colturano
- Colzate
- Comabbio
- Comacchio
- Comano
- Comazzo
- Comeglians
- Comelico Superiore
- Comerio
- Comezzano-Cizzago
- Comignago
- Comiso
- Comitini
- Comiziano
- Commessaggio
- Commezzadura
- Como
- Compiano
- Comun Nuovo
- Comunanza
- Cona
- Conca Casale
- Conca dei Marini
- Conca della Campania
- Concamarise
- Concei
- Concerviano
- Concesio
- Conco
- Concordia Sagittaria
- Concordia sulla Secchia
- Concorezzo
- Condino
- Condofuri
- Condove
- Condrò
- Conegliano
- Confienza
- Configni
- Conflenti
- Coniolo
- Conselice
- Conselve
- Consiglio di Rumo
- Contessa Entellina
- Contigliano
- Contrada
- Controguerra
- Controne
- Contursi Terme
- Conversano
- Conza della Campania
- Conzano
- Copertino
- Copiano
- Copparo
- Corana
- Corato
- Corbara
- Corbetta
- Corbola
- Corchiano
- Corciano
- Cordenons
- Cordignano
- Cordovado
- Coredo
- Coreglia Antelminelli
- Coreglia Ligure
- Coreno Ausonio
- Corfinio
- Cori
- Coriano
- Corigliano Calabro
- Corigliano d'Otranto
- Corinaldo
- Corio
- Corleone
- Corleto Monforte
- Corleto Perticara
- Cormano
- Cormons
- Corna Imagna
- Cornalba
- Cornale e Bastida
- Cornaredo
- Cornate d'Adda
- Cornedo Vicentino
- Cornegliano Laudense
- Corneliano d'Alba
- Corniglio
- Corno di Rosazzo
- Corno Giovine
- Cornovecchio
- Cornuda
- Correggio
- Correzzana
- Correzzola
- Corrido
- Corridonia
- Corropoli
- Corsano
- Corsico
- Corsione
- Cortale
- Cortandone
- Cortanze
- Cortazzone
- Corte Brugnatella
- Corte de' Cortesi con Cignone
- Corte de' Frati
- Corte Franca
- Corte Palasio
- Cortemaggiore
- Cortemilia
- Corteno Golgi
- Cortenova
- Cortenuova
- Corteolona
- Cortiglione
- Cortina d'Ampezzo
- Cortino
- Cortona
- Corvara (South Tyrol)
- Corvara (Abruzzo)
- Corvino San Quirico
- Corzano
- Coseano
- Cosenza
- Cosio di Arroscia
- Cosio Valtellino
- Cosoleto
- Cossano Belbo
- Cossano Canavese
- Cossato
- Cosseria
- Cossignano
- Cossogno
- Cossoine
- Cossombrato
- Costa de' Nobili
- Costa di Mezzate
- Costa di Rovigo
- Costa di Serina
- Costa Masnaga
- Costa Valle Imagna
- Costa Vescovato
- Costa Volpino
- Costabissara
- Costacciaro
- Costanzana
- Costarainera
- Costermano
- Costigliole d'Asti
- Costigliole Saluzzo
- Cotignola
- Cotronei
- Cottanello
- Courmayeur
- Covo
- Cozzo
- Craco
- Crandola Valsassina
- Cravagliana
- Cravanzana
- Craveggia
- Creazzo
- Crecchio
- Credaro
- Credera Rubbiano
- Crema
- Cremella
- Cremenaga
- Cremeno
- Cremia
- Cremolino
- Cremona
- Cremosano
- Crescentino
- Crespadoro
- Crespano del Grappa
- Crespellano
- Crespiatica
- Crespina
- Crespino
- Cressa
- Crevacuore
- Crevalcore
- Crevoladossola
- Crispano
- Crispiano
- Crissolo
- Crocefieschi
- Crocetta del Montello
- Crodo
- Crognaleto
- Cropalati
- Cropani
- Crosa
- Crosia
- Crosio della Valle
- Crotone
- Crotta d'Adda
- Crova
- Croviana
- Crucoli
- Cuasso al Monte
- Cuccaro Vetere
- Cucciago
- Cuceglio
- Cuggiono
- Cugliate-Fabiasco
- Cuglieri
- Cugnoli
- Cumiana
- Cumignano sul Naviglio
- Cunardo
- Cuneo
- Cunevo
- Cunico
- Cuorgnè
- Cupello
- Cupra Marittima
- Cupramontana
- Cura Carpignano
- Curcuris
- Cureggio
- Curiglia con Monteviasco
- Curinga
- Curino
- Curno
- Cursi
- Curtarolo
- Curtatone
- Curti
- Cusago
- Cusano Milanino
- Cusano Mutri
- Cusino
- Cusio
- Custonaci
- Cutigliano
- Cutro
- Cutrofiano
- Cuveglio
- Cuvio

== D ==
- Dairago
- Dalmine
- Dambel
- Danta di Cadore
- Daone
- Darè
- Darfo Boario Terme
- Dasà
- Davagna
- Daverio
- Davoli
- Dazio
- Decimomannu
- Decimoputzu
- Decollatura
- Dego
- Deiva Marina
- Delebio
- Delia
- Delianuova
- Deliceto
- Dello
- Demonte
- Denice
- Denno
- Dernice
- Derovere
- Deruta
- Dervio
- Desana
- Desenzano del Garda
- Desio
- Desulo
- Deutschnofen
- Diamante
- Diano Arentino
- Diano Castello
- Diano d'Alba
- Diano Marina
- Diano San Pietro
- Dicomano
- Dignano
- Dimaro
- Dinami
- Dipignano
- Diso
- Divignano
- Dizzasco
- Doberdò del Lago
- Dogliani
- Dogliola
- Dogna
- Dolcè
- Dolceacqua
- Dolcedo
- Dolegna del Collio
- Dolianova
- Dolo
- Dolzago
- Domanico
- Domaso
- Domegge di Cadore
- Domicella
- Domodossola
- Domus de Maria
- Domusnovas
- Don
- Donato
- Dongo
- Donnas
- Donori
- Dorgali
- Dorio
- Dormelletto
- Dorno
- Dorsino
- Dorzano
- Dosolo
- Dossena
- Dosso del Liro
- Doues
- Dovadola
- Dovera
- Dozza
- Dragoni
- Drapia
- Drena
- Drenchia
- Dresano
- Drezzo
- Drizzona
- Dro
- Dronero
- Druento
- Druogno
- Dualchi
- Dubino
- Due Carrare
- Dueville
- Dugenta
- Duino-Aurisina
- Dumenza
- Duno
- Durazzano
- Duronia
- Dusino San Michele

== E ==
- Eboli
- Edolo
- Elice
- Elini
- Ello
- Elmas
- Elva
- Émarèse
- Empoli
- Endine Gaiano
- Enego
- Enemonzo
- Enna
- Entracque
- Entratico
- Envie
- Episcopia
- Eppan an der Weinstraße
- Eraclea
- Erba
- Erbè
- Erbezzo
- Erbusco
- Erchie
- Ercolano
- Erice
- Erli
- Erto e Casso
- Erula
- Erve
- Esanatoglia
- Escalaplano
- Escolca
- Esine
- Esino Lario
- Esperia
- Esporlatu
- Este
- Esterzili
- Étroubles
- Eupilio
- Exilles

== F ==
- Fabbrica Curone
- Fabbriche di Vergemoli
- Fabbrico
- Fabriano
- Fabrica di Roma
- Fabrizia
- Fabro
- Faedis
- Faedo
- Faedo Valtellino
- Faenza
- Faeto
- Fagagna
- Faggeto Lario
- Faggiano
- Fagnano Alto
- Fagnano Castello
- Fagnano Olona
- Fai della Paganella
- Faicchio
- Falcade
- Falciano del Massico
- Falconara Albanese
- Falconara Marittima
- Falcone
- Faleria
- Falerna
- Falerone
- Fallo
- Faloppio
- Falvaterra
- Fanano
- Fanna
- Fano
- Fano Adriano
- Fara Filiorum Petri
- Fara Gera d'Adda
- Fara in Sabina
- Fara Novarese
- Fara Olivana con Sola
- Fara San Martino
- Fara Vicentino
- Fardella
- Farigliano
- Farindola
- Farini
- Farnese
- Farra di Soligo
- Farra d'Isonzo
- Fasano
- Fascia
- Fauglia
- Faule
- Favale di Malvaro
- Favara
- Favignana
- Favria
- Feisoglio
- Feldthurns
- Feletto
- Felino
- Felitto
- Felizzano
- Feltre
- Fenegrò
- Fenestrelle
- Fénis
- Ferentillo
- Ferentino
- Ferla
- Fermignano
- Fermo
- Ferno
- Feroleto Antico
- Feroleto della Chiesa
- Ferrandina
- Ferrara
- Ferrara di Monte Baldo
- Ferrazzano
- Ferrera di Varese
- Ferrera Erbognone
- Ferrere
- Ferriere
- Ferruzzano
- Fiamignano
- Fiano
- Fiano Romano
- Fiastra
- Fiavè
- Ficarazzi
- Ficarolo
- Ficarra
- Ficulle
- Fidenza
- Fierozzo
- Fiesco
- Fiesole
- Fiesse
- Fiesso d'Artico
- Fiesso Umbertiano
- Figino Serenza
- Figline e Incisa Valdarno
- Figline Vegliaturo
- Filacciano
- Filadelfia
- Filago
- Filandari
- Filattiera
- Filettino
- Filetto
- Filiano
- Filighera
- Filignano
- Filogaso
- Filottrano
- Finale Emilia
- Finale Ligure
- Fino del Monte
- Fino Mornasco
- Fiorano al Serio
- Fiorano Canavese
- Fiorano Modenese
- Fiorenzuola d'Arda
- Firenzuola
- Firmo
- Fiscaglia
- Fisciano
- Fiuggi
- Fiumalbo
- Fiumara
- Fiume Veneto
- Fiumedinisi
- Fiumefreddo Bruzio
- Fiumefreddo di Sicilia
- Fiumicello Villa Vicentina
- Fiumicino
- Fiuminata
- Fivizzano
- Flaibano
- Flero
- Florence
- Floresta
- Floridia
- Florinas
- Flumeri
- Fluminimaggiore
- Flussio
- Fobello
- Foggia
- Foglianise
- Fogliano Redipuglia
- Foglizzo
- Foiano della Chiana
- Foiano di Val Fortore
- Folgaria
- Folignano
- Foligno
- Follina
- Follo
- Follonica
- Fombio
- Fondachelli-Fantina
- Fondi
- Fondo
- Fonni
- Fontainemore
- Fontana Liri
- Fontanafredda
- Fontanarosa
- Fontanelice
- Fontanella
- Fontanellato
- Fontanelle
- Fontaneto d'Agogna
- Fontanetto Po
- Fontanigorda
- Fontanile
- Fontaniva
- Fonte
- Fonte Nuova
- Fontecchio
- Fontechiari
- Fontegreca
- Fonteno
- Fontevivo
- Fonzaso
- Foppolo
- Forano
- Force
- Forchia
- Forcola
- Fordongianus
- Forenza
- Foresto Sparso
- Forgaria nel Friuli
- Forino
- Forio
- Forlì
- Forlì del Sannio
- Forlimpopoli
- Formazza
- Formello
- Formia
- Formicola
- Formigara
- Formigine
- Formigliana
- Fornace
- Fornelli
- Forni Avoltri
- Forni di Sopra
- Forni di Sotto
- Forno Canavese
- Fornovo di Taro
- Fornovo San Giovanni
- Forte dei Marmi
- Fortunago
- Forza d'Agrò
- Fosciandora
- Fosdinovo
- Fossa
- Fossacesia
- Fossalta di Piave
- Fossalta di Portogruaro
- Fossalto
- Fossano
- Fossato di Vico
- Fossato Serralta
- Fossò
- Fossombrone
- Foza
- Frabosa Soprana
- Frabosa Sottana
- Fraconalto
- Fragagnano
- Fragneto l'Abate
- Fragneto Monforte
- Fraine
- Framura
- Francavilla al Mare
- Francavilla Angitola
- Francavilla Bisio
- Francavilla d'Ete
- Francavilla di Sicilia
- Francavilla Fontana
- Francavilla in Sinni
- Francavilla Marittima
- Francica
- Francofonte
- Francolise
- Franzensfeste
- Frascaro
- Frascarolo
- Frascati
- Frascineto
- Frassilongo
- Frassinelle Polesine
- Frassinello Monferrato
- Frassineto Po
- Frassinetto
- Frassino
- Frassinoro
- Frasso Sabino
- Frasso Telesino
- Fratta Polesine
- Fratta Todina
- Frattamaggiore
- Frattaminore
- Fratte Rosa
- Frazzanò
- Fregona
- Freienfeld
- Fresagrandinaria
- Fresonara
- Frigento
- Frignano
- Frinco
- Frisa
- Frisanco
- Front
- Frontino
- Frontone
- Frosinone
- Frosolone
- Frossasco
- Frugarolo
- Fubine Monferrato
- Fucecchio
- Fuipiano Valle Imagna
- Fumane
- Fumone
- Furci
- Furci Siculo
- Furnari
- Furore
- Furtei
- Fuscaldo
- Fusignano
- Fusine
- Futani

== G ==
- Gabbioneta-Binanuova
- Gabiano
- Gabicce Mare
- Gaby
- Gadesco-Pieve Delmona
- Gadoni
- Gaeta
- Gaggi
- Gaggiano
- Gaggio Montano
- Gaglianico
- Gagliano Aterno
- Gagliano Castelferrato
- Gagliano del Capo
- Gagliato
- Gagliole
- Gaiarine
- Gaiba
- Gaiola
- Gaiole in Chianti
- Gairo
- Gais
- Galati Mamertino
- Galatina
- Galatone
- Galatro
- Galbiate
- Galeata
- Galgagnano
- Gallarate
- Gallese
- Galliate
- Galliate Lombardo
- Galliavola
- Gallicano
- Gallicano nel Lazio
- Gallicchio
- Galliera
- Galliera Veneta
- Gallinaro
- Gallio
- Gallipoli
- Gallo Matese
- Gallodoro
- Galluccio
- Galtellì
- Galzignano Terme
- Gamalero
- Gambara
- Gambarana
- Gambasca
- Gambassi Terme
- Gambatesa
- Gambellara
- Gamberale
- Gambettola
- Gambolò
- Gambugliano
- Gandellino
- Gandino
- Gandosso
- Gangi
- Garaguso
- Garbagna
- Garbagna Novarese
- Garbagnate Milanese
- Garbagnate Monastero
- Garda
- Gardone Riviera
- Gardone Val Trompia
- Garessio
- Gargallo
- Gargazon
- Gargnano
- Garlasco
- Garlate
- Garlenda
- Garniga Terme
- Garzeno
- Garzigliana
- Gasperina
- Gassino Torinese
- Gattatico
- Gatteo
- Gattico-Veruno
- Gattinara
- Gavardo
- Gavello
- Gaverina Terme
- Gavi
- Gavignano
- Gavirate
- Gavoi
- Gavorrano
- Gazoldo degli Ippoliti
- Gazzada Schianno
- Gazzaniga
- Gazzo
- Gazzo Veronese
- Gazzola
- Gazzuolo
- Gela
- Gemmano
- Gemona del Friuli
- Gemonio
- Genazzano
- Genga
- Genivolta
- Genoa
- Genola
- Genoni
- Genuri
- Genzano di Lucania
- Genzano di Roma
- Gera Lario
- Gerace
- Geraci Siculo
- Gerano
- Gerenzago
- Gerenzano
- Gergei
- Germagnano
- Germagno
- Germignaga
- Gerocarne
- Gerola Alta
- Gerre de' Caprioli
- Gesico
- Gessate
- Gessopalena
- Gesturi
- Gesualdo
- Ghedi
- Ghemme
- Ghiffa
- Ghilarza
- Ghisalba
- Ghislarengo
- Giacciano con Baruchella
- Giaglione
- Gianico
- Giano dell'Umbria
- Giano Vetusto
- Giardinello
- Giardini Naxos
- Giarole
- Giarratana
- Giarre
- Giave
- Giaveno
- Giavera del Montello
- Giba
- Gibellina
- Gifflenga
- Giffone
- Giffoni Sei Casali
- Giffoni Valle Piana
- Giglio Island
- Gignese
- Gignod
- Gildone
- Gimigliano
- Ginestra
- Ginestra degli Schiavoni
- Ginosa
- Gioi
- Gioia dei Marsi
- Gioia del Colle
- Gioia Sannitica
- Gioia Tauro
- Gioiosa Ionica
- Gioiosa Marea
- Giove
- Giovinazzo
- Giovo
- Girasole
- Girifalco
- Gissi
- Giuggianello
- Giugliano in Campania
- Giuliana
- Giuliano di Roma
- Giuliano Teatino
- Giulianova
- Giungano
- Giurdignano
- Giussago
- Giussano
- Giustenice
- Giustino
- Giusvalla
- Givoletto
- Gizzeria
- Glurns
- Godega di Sant'Urbano
- Godiasco Salice Terme
- Godrano
- Goito
- Golasecca
- Golferenzo
- Golfo Aranci
- Gombito
- Gonars
- Goni
- Gonnesa
- Gonnoscodina
- Gonnosfanadiga
- Gonnosnò
- Gonnostramatza
- Gonzaga
- Gordona
- Gorga
- Gorgo al Monticano
- Gorgoglione
- Gorgonzola
- Goriano Sicoli
- Gorizia
- Gorla Maggiore
- Gorla Minore
- Gorlago
- Gorle
- Gornate-Olona
- Gorno
- Goro
- Gorreto
- Gorzegno
- Gosaldo
- Gossolengo
- Gottasecca
- Gottolengo
- Govone
- Gozzano
- Gradara
- Gradisca d'Isonzo
- Grado
- Gradoli
- Graffignana
- Graffignano
- Graglia
- Gragnano
- Gragnano Trebbiense
- Grammichele
- Grana
- Granarolo dell'Emilia
- Grandate
- Grandola ed Uniti
- Graniti
- Granozzo con Monticello
- Grantola
- Grantorto
- Granze
- Grassano
- Grassobbio
- Gratteri
- Graun im Vinschgau
- Gravedona ed Uniti
- Gravellona Lomellina
- Gravellona Toce
- Gravere
- Gravina di Catania
- Gravina in Puglia
- Grazzanise
- Grazzano Badoglio
- Greccio
- Greci
- Greggio
- Gremiasco
- Gressan
- Gressoney-La-Trinité
- Gressoney-Saint-Jean
- Greve in Chianti
- Grezzago
- Grezzana
- Griante
- Gricignano di Aversa
- Grignasco
- Grigno
- Grimacco
- Grimaldi
- Grinzane Cavour
- Grisignano di Zocco
- Grisolia
- Grizzana Morandi
- Grognardo
- Gromo
- Grondona
- Grone
- Grontardo
- Gropello Cairoli
- Gropparello
- Groscavallo
- Grosio
- Grosotto
- Grosseto
- Grosso
- Grottaferrata
- Grottaglie
- Grottaminarda
- Grottammare
- Grottazzolina
- Grotte
- Grotte di Castro
- Grotteria
- Grottole
- Grottolella
- Gruaro
- Grugliasco
- Grumello Cremonese ed Uniti
- Grumello del Monte
- Grumento Nova
- Grumo Appula
- Grumo Nevano
- Grumolo delle Abbadesse
- Gsies
- Guagnano
- Gualdo
- Gualdo Cattaneo
- Gualdo Tadino
- Gualtieri
- Gualtieri Sicaminò
- Guamaggiore
- Guanzate
- Guarcino
- Guarda Veneta
- Guardabosone
- Guardamiglio
- Guardavalle
- Guardea
- Guardia Lombardi
- Guardia Perticara
- Guardia Piemontese
- Guardia Sanframondi
- Guardiagrele
- Guardialfiera
- Guardiaregia
- Guardistallo
- Guarene
- Guasila
- Guastalla
- Guazzora
- Gubbio
- Gudo Visconti
- Guglionesi
- Guidizzolo
- Guidonia Montecelio
- Guiglia
- Guilmi
- Gurro
- Guspini
- Gussago
- Gussola

== H ==
- Hafling
- Hône

== I ==
- Idro
- Iglesias
- Igliano
- Ilbono
- Illasi
- Illorai
- Imbersago
- Imer
- Imola
- Imperia
- Impruneta
- Inarzo
- Incisa Scapaccino
- Incudine
- Induno Olona
- Ingria
- Innichen
- Intragna
- Introbio
- Introd
- Introdacqua
- Inverigo
- Inverno e Monteleone
- Inverso Pinasca
- Inveruno
- Invorio
- Inzago
- Irgoli
- Irma
- Irsina
- Isasca
- Isca sullo Ionio
- Ischia
- Ischia di Castro
- Ischitella
- Iseo
- Isera
- Isernia
- Isili
- Isnello
- Isola d'Asti
- Isola del Cantone
- Isola del Gran Sasso d'Italia
- Isola del Liri
- Isola del Piano
- Isola della Scala
- Isola delle Femmine
- Isola di Capo Rizzuto
- Isola di Fondra
- Isola Dovarese
- Isola Rizza
- Isola Sant'Antonio
- Isola Vicentina
- Isolabella
- Isolabona
- Isorella
- Ispani
- Ispica
- Ispra
- Issiglio
- Issime
- Isso
- Issogne
- Istrana
- Itala
- Itri
- Ittireddu
- Ittiri
- Ivrea
- Izano

== J ==
- Jacurso
- Jelsi
- Jenesien
- Jenne
- Jerago con Orago
- Jerzu
- Jesi
- Jesolo
- Jolanda di Savoia
- Jonadi
- Joppolo
- Joppolo Giancaxio
- Jovençan

== K ==
- Kaltern an der Weinstraße
- Karneid
- Kastelbell-Tschars
- Kastelruth
- Kiens
- Klausen
- Kuens
- Kurtatsch an der Weinstraße
- Kurtinig an der Weinstraße

== L ==
- La Cassa
- La Loggia
- La Maddalena
- La Magdeleine
- La Morra
- La Salle
- La Spezia
- La Thuile
- La Val
- La Valle Agordina
- La Valletta Brianza
- Laas
- Labico
- Labro
- Lacchiarella
- Lacco Ameno
- Lacedonia
- Laconi
- Ladispoli
- Laerru
- Laganadi
- Laghi
- Laglio
- Lagnasco
- Lago
- Lagonegro
- Lagosanto
- Laigueglia
- Lainate
- Laino
- Laino Borgo
- Laino Castello
- Laives
- Lajatico
- Lajen
- Lallio
- Lama dei Peligni
- Lama Mocogno
- Lambrugo
- Lamezia Terme
- Lamon
- Lampedusa e Linosa
- Lamporecchio
- Lamporo
- Lana
- Lanciano
- Landiona
- Landriano
- Langhirano
- Langosco
- Lanusei
- Lanuvio
- Lanzada
- Lanzo Torinese
- Lapedona
- Lapio
- Lappano
- L'Aquila
- Larciano
- Lardirago
- Lariano
- Larino
- Las Plassas
- Lascari
- Lasnigo
- Lastebasse
- Lastra a Signa
- Latera
- Laterina Pergine Valdarno
- Laterza
- Latiano
- Latina
- Latisana
- Latronico
- Latsch
- Lattarico
- Lauco
- Laureana Cilento
- Laureana di Borrello
- Laurein
- Laurenzana
- Lauria
- Lauriano
- Laurino
- Laurito
- Lauro
- Lavagna
- Lavagno
- Lavarone
- Lavello
- Lavena Ponte Tresa
- Laveno-Mombello
- Lavenone
- Laviano
- Lavis
- Lazise
- Lazzate
- Lecce
- Lecce nei Marsi
- Lecco
- Ledro
- Leffe
- Leggiuno
- Legnago
- Legnano
- Legnaro
- Lei
- Leinì
- Leivi
- Lemie
- Lendinara
- Leni
- Lenna
- Leno
- Lenola
- Lenta
- Lentate sul Seveso
- Lentella
- Lentiai
- Lentini
- Leonessa
- Leonforte
- Leporano
- Lequile
- Lequio Berria
- Lequio Tanaro
- Lercara Friddi
- Lerici
- Lerma
- Lesa
- Lesegno
- Lesignano de' Bagni
- Lesina
- Lesmo
- Lessolo
- Lessona
- Lestizza
- Letino
- Letojanni
- Lettere
- Lettomanoppello
- Lettopalena
- Levanto
- Levate
- Leverano
- Levice
- Levico Terme
- Levone
- Lezzeno
- Liberi
- Librizzi
- Licata
- Licciana Nardi
- Licenza
- Licodia Eubea
- Lierna
- Lignana
- Lignano Sabbiadoro
- Lillianes
- Limana
- Limatola
- Limbadi
- Limbiate
- Limena
- Limido Comasco
- Limina
- Limone Piemonte
- Limone sul Garda
- Limosano
- Linarolo
- Linguaglossa
- Lioni
- Lipari
- Lipomo
- Lirio
- Liscate
- Liscia
- Lisciano Niccone
- Lisio
- Lissone
- Liveri
- Livigno
- Livinallongo del Col di Lana
- Livo (Province of Como)
- Livo (Province of Trento)
- Livorno
- Livorno Ferraris
- Livraga
- Lizzanello
- Lizzano
- Lizzano in Belvedere
- Loano
- Loazzolo
- Locana
- Locate di Triulzi
- Locate Varesino
- Locatello
- Loceri
- Locorotondo
- Locri
- Loculi
- Lodè
- Lodi
- Lodi Vecchio
- Lodine
- Lodrino
- Lograto
- Loiano
- Loiri Porto San Paolo
- Lomagna
- Lomazzo
- Lombardore
- Lombriasco
- Lomello
- Lona-Lases
- Lonate Ceppino
- Lonate Pozzolo
- Lonato del Garda
- Londa
- Longano
- Longare
- Longarone
- Longhena
- Longi
- Longiano
- Longobardi
- Longobucco
- Longone al Segrino
- Longone Sabino
- Lonigo
- Loranzè
- Loreggia
- Loreglia
- Lorenzago di Cadore
- Loreo
- Loreto
- Loreto Aprutino
- Loria
- Loro Ciuffenna
- Loro Piceno
- Lorsica
- Losine
- Lotzorai
- Lovere
- Lovero
- Lozio
- Lozza
- Lozzo Atestino
- Lozzo di Cadore
- Lozzolo
- Lu e Cuccaro Monferrato
- Lubriano
- Lucca
- Lucca Sicula
- Lucera
- Lucignano
- Lucinasco
- Lucito
- Luco dei Marsi
- Lucoli
- Lugagnano Val d'Arda
- Lugnano in Teverina
- Lugo
- Lugo di Vicenza
- Luino
- Luisago
- Lula
- Lumarzo
- Lumezzane
- Lunamatrona
- Lunano
- Lungavilla
- Lungro
- Luni
- Luogosano
- Luogosanto
- Lupara
- Lurago d'Erba
- Lurago Marinone
- Lurano
- Luras
- Lurate Caccivio
- Lusciano
- Lüsen
- Luserna
- Luserna San Giovanni
- Lusernetta
- Lusevera
- Lusia
- Lusiana
- Lusigliè
- Lustra
- Luvinate
- Luzzana
- Luzzara
- Luzzi

== M ==
- Maccagno con Pino e Veddasca
- Maccastorna
- Macchia d'Isernia
- Macchia Valfortore
- Macchiagodena
- Macello
- Macerata
- Macerata Campania
- Macerata Feltria
- Macherio
- Maclodio
- Macomer
- Macra
- Macugnaga
- Maddaloni
- Madesimo
- Madignano
- Madone
- Madonna del Sasso
- Madruzzo
- Maenza
- Mafalda
- Magasa
- Magenta
- Maggiora
- Magherno
- Magione
- Magisano
- Magliano Alfieri
- Magliano Alpi
- Magliano de' Marsi
- Magliano di Tenna
- Magliano in Toscana
- Magliano Romano
- Magliano Sabina
- Magliano Vetere
- Maglie
- Magliolo
- Maglione
- Magnacavallo
- Magnago
- Magnano
- Magnano in Riviera
- Magomadas
- Magreglio
- Maida
- Maierà
- Maierato
- Maiolati Spontini
- Maiolo
- Maiori
- Mairago
- Mairano
- Maissana
- Majano
- Malagnino
- Malalbergo
- Malborghetto Valbruna
- Malcesine
- Malè
- Malegno
- Maleo
- Malesco
- Maletto
- Malfa
- Malgesso
- Malgrate
- Malito
- Mallare
- Malnate
- Malo
- Malonno
- Malosco
- Mals
- Maltignano
- Malvagna
- Malvicino
- Malvito
- Mammola
- Mamoiada
- Manciano
- Mandanici
- Mandas
- Mandatoriccio
- Mandela
- Mandello del Lario
- Mandello Vitta
- Manduria
- Manerba del Garda
- Manerbio
- Manfredonia
- Mango
- Mangone
- Maniace
- Maniago
- Manocalzati
- Manoppello
- Mansuè
- Manta
- Mantello
- Mantua
- Manzano
- Manziana
- Mapello
- Mappano
- Mara
- Maracalagonis
- Maranello
- Marano di Napoli
- Marano di Valpolicella
- Marano Equo
- Marano Lagunare
- Marano Marchesato
- Marano Principato
- Marano sul Panaro
- Marano Ticino
- Marano Vicentino
- Maranzana
- Maratea
- Marcallo con Casone
- Marcaria
- Marcedusa
- Marcellina
- Marcellinara
- Marcetelli
- Marcheno
- Marchirolo
- Marciana
- Marciana Marina
- Marcianise
- Marciano della Chiana
- Marcignago
- Marcon
- Marene
- Mareno di Piave
- Marentino
- Mareo
- Maretto
- Margarita
- Margherita di Savoia
- Margno
- Margreid an der Weinstraße
- Mariana Mantovana
- Mariano Comense
- Mariano del Friuli
- Marianopoli
- Mariglianella
- Marigliano
- Marina di Gioiosa Ionica
- Marineo
- Marino
- Marliana
- Marling
- Marmentino
- Marmirolo
- Marmora
- Marnate
- Marone
- Maropati
- Marostica
- Marradi
- Marrubiu
- Marsaglia
- Marsala
- Marsciano
- Marsico Nuovo
- Marsicovetere
- Marta
- Martano
- Martell
- Martellago
- Martignacco
- Martignana di Po
- Martignano
- Martina Franca
- Martinengo
- Martiniana Po
- Martinsicuro
- Martirano
- Martirano Lombardo
- Martis
- Martone
- Marudo
- Maruggio
- Marzabotto
- Marzano
- Marzano Appio
- Marzano di Nola
- Marzi
- Marzio
- Masainas
- Masate
- Mascali
- Mascalucia
- Maschito
- Masciago Primo
- Maser
- Masera
- Maserà di Padova
- Maserada sul Piave
- Masi
- Masi Torello
- Masio
- Maslianico
- Mason Vicentino
- Masone
- Massa
- Massa d'Albe
- Massa di Somma
- Massa e Cozzile
- Massa Fermana
- Massa Lombarda
- Massa Lubrense
- Massa Marittima
- Massa Martana
- Massafra
- Massalengo
- Massanzago
- Massarosa
- Massazza
- Massello
- Masserano
- Massignano
- Massimeno
- Massimino
- Massino Visconti
- Massiola
- Masullas
- Matelica
- Matera
- Mathi
- Matino
- Matrice
- Mattie
- Mattinata
- Mazara del Vallo
- Mazzano
- Mazzano Romano
- Mazzarino
- Mazzarrà Sant'Andrea
- Mazzarrone
- Mazzè
- Mazzin
- Mazzo di Valtellina
- Meana di Susa
- Meana Sardo
- Meda
- Mede
- Medea
- Medesano
- Medicina
- Mediglia
- Medolago
- Medole
- Medolla
- Meduna di Livenza
- Meduno
- Megliadino San Vitale
- Meina
- Mel
- Melara
- Melazzo
- Meldola
- Mele
- Melegnano
- Melendugno
- Meleti
- Melfi
- Melicuccà
- Melicucco
- Melilli
- Melissa
- Melissano
- Melito di Napoli
- Melito di Porto Salvo
- Melito Irpino
- Melizzano
- Melle
- Mello
- Melpignano
- Melzo
- Menaggio
- Menconico
- Mendatica
- Mendicino
- Menfi
- Mentana
- Meolo
- Merana
- Merano
- Merate
- Mercallo
- Mercatello sul Metauro
- Mercatino Conca
- Mercato San Severino
- Mercato Saraceno
- Mercenasco
- Mercogliano
- Mereto di Tomba
- Mergo
- Mergozzo
- Merì
- Merlara
- Merlino
- Merone
- Mesagne
- Mese
- Mesenzana
- Mesero
- Mesola
- Mesoraca
- Messina
- Mestrino
- Meta
- Mezzago
- Mezzana
- Mezzana Bigli
- Mezzana Mortigliengo
- Mezzana Rabattone
- Mezzane di Sotto
- Mezzanego
- Mezzanino
- Mezzano
- Mezzenile
- Mezzocorona
- Mezzojuso
- Mezzoldo
- Mezzolombardo
- Mezzomerico
- Miagliano
- Miane
- Miasino
- Miazzina
- Micigliano
- Miggiano
- Miglianico
- Miglierina
- Miglionico
- Mignanego
- Mignano Monte Lungo
- Milan
- Milazzo
- Milena
- Mileto
- Milis
- Militello in Val di Catania
- Militello Rosmarino
- Millesimo
- Milo
- Milzano
- Mineo
- Minerbe
- Minerbio
- Minervino di Lecce
- Minervino Murge
- Minori
- Minturno
- Minucciano
- Mioglia
- Mira
- Mirabella Eclano
- Mirabella Imbaccari
- Mirabello Monferrato
- Mirabello Sannitico
- Miradolo Terme
- Miranda
- Mirandola
- Mirano
- Mirto
- Misano Adriatico
- Misano di Gera d'Adda
- Misilmeri
- Misinto
- Missaglia
- Missanello
- Misterbianco
- Mistretta
- Moasca
- Mocònesi
- Modena
- Modica
- Modigliana
- Modolo
- Modugno
- Moena
- Moggio
- Moggio Udinese
- Moglia
- Mogliano
- Mogliano Veneto
- Mogorella
- Mogoro
- Moiano
- Moimacco
- Moio de' Calvi
- Moio della Civitella
- Moiola
- Mojo Alcantara
- Mola di Bari
- Molare
- Molazzana
- Molfetta
- Molina Aterno
- Molinara
- Molinella
- Molini di Triora
- Molino dei Torti
- Molise
- Moliterno
- Mollia
- Molochio
- Mölten
- Molteno
- Moltrasio
- Molvena
- Molveno
- Mombaldone
- Mombarcaro
- Mombaroccio
- Mombaruzzo
- Mombasiglio
- Mombello di Torino
- Mombello Monferrato
- Mombercelli
- Momo
- Mompantero
- Mompeo
- Momperone
- Monacilioni
- Monale
- Monasterace
- Monastero Bormida
- Monastero di Lanzo
- Monastero di Vasco
- Monasterolo Casotto
- Monasterolo del Castello
- Monasterolo di Savigliano
- Monastier di Treviso
- Monastir
- Moncalieri
- Moncalvo
- Moncenisio
- Moncestino
- Monchiero
- Monchio delle Corti
- Moncrivello
- Moncucco Torinese
- Mondaino
- Mondavio
- Mondolfo
- Mondovì
- Mondragone
- Moneglia
- Monesiglio
- Monfalcone
- Monforte d'Alba
- Monforte San Giorgio
- Monfumo
- Mongardino
- Monghidoro
- Mongiana
- Mongiardino Ligure
- Mongiuffi Melia
- Mongrando
- Mongrassano
- Monguzzo
- Moniga del Garda
- Monleale
- Monno
- Monopoli
- Monreale
- Monrupino
- Monsampietro Morico
- Monsampolo del Tronto
- Monsano
- Monselice
- Monserrato
- Monsummano Terme
- Montà
- Montabone
- Montacuto
- Montafia
- Montagano
- Montagna in Valtellina
- Montagnana
- Montagnareale
- Montaguto
- Montaione
- Montalbano Elicona
- Montalbano Jonico
- Montalcino
- Montaldeo
- Montaldo Bormida
- Montaldo di Mondovì
- Montaldo Roero
- Montaldo Scarampi
- Montaldo Torinese
- Montale
- Montalenghe
- Montallegro
- Montalto delle Marche
- Montalto di Castro
- Montalto Dora
- Montalto Carpasio
- Montalto Pavese
- Montalto Uffugo
- Montan
- Montanaro
- Montanaso Lombardo
- Montanera
- Montano Antilia
- Montano Lucino
- Montappone
- Montaquila
- Montasola
- Montauro
- Montazzoli
- Monte Argentario
- Monte Castello di Vibio
- Monte Cavallo
- Monte Cerignone
- Monte Compatri
- Monte Cremasco
- Monte di Malo
- Monte di Procida
- Monte Giberto
- Monte Grimano
- Monte Isola
- Monte Marenzo
- Monte Porzio
- Monte Porzio Catone
- Monte Rinaldo
- Monte Roberto
- Monte Romano
- Monte San Biagio
- Monte San Giacomo
- Monte San Giovanni Campano
- Monte San Giovanni in Sabina
- Monte San Giusto
- Monte San Martino
- Monte San Pietrangeli
- Monte San Pietro
- Monte San Savino
- Monte San Vito
- Monte Santa Maria Tiberina
- Monte Sant'Angelo
- Monte Urano
- Monte Vidon Combatte
- Monte Vidon Corrado
- Montebello della Battaglia
- Montebello di Bertona
- Montebello Ionico
- Montebello sul Sangro
- Montebello Vicentino
- Montebelluna
- Montebruno
- Montebuono
- Montecalvo in Foglia
- Montecalvo Irpino
- Montecalvo Versiggia
- Montecarlo
- Montecarotto
- Montecassiano
- Montecastello
- Montecastrilli
- Montecatini Terme
- Montecatini Val di Cecina
- Montecchia di Crosara
- Montecchio
- Montecchio Emilia
- Montecchio Maggiore
- Montecchio Precalcino
- Montechiaro d'Acqui
- Montechiaro d'Asti
- Montechiarugolo
- Monteciccardo
- Montecilfone
- Montecopiolo
- Montecorice
- Montecorvino Pugliano
- Montecorvino Rovella
- Montecosaro
- Montecrestese
- Montecreto
- Montedinove
- Montedoro
- Montefalcione
- Montefalco
- Montefalcone Appennino
- Montefalcone di Val Fortore
- Montefalcone nel Sannio
- Montefano
- Montefelcino
- Monteferrante
- Montefiascone
- Montefino
- Montefiore Conca
- Montefiore dell'Aso
- Montefiorino
- Monteflavio
- Monteforte Cilento
- Monteforte d'Alpone
- Monteforte Irpino
- Montefortino
- Montefranco
- Montefredane
- Montefusco
- Montegabbione
- Montegalda
- Montegaldella
- Montegallo
- Montegioco
- Montegiordano
- Montegiorgio
- Montegranaro
- Montegridolfo
- Montegrino Valtravaglia
- Montegrosso d'Asti
- Montegrosso Pian Latte
- Montegrotto Terme
- Monteiasi
- Montelabbate
- Montelanico
- Montelapiano
- Monteleone di Fermo
- Monteleone di Puglia
- Monteleone di Spoleto
- Monteleone d'Orvieto
- Monteleone Rocca Doria
- Monteleone Sabino
- Montelepre
- Montelibretti
- Montella
- Montello
- Montelongo
- Montelparo
- Montelupo Albese
- Montelupo Fiorentino
- Montelupone
- Montemaggiore Belsito
- Montemagno
- Montemale di Cuneo
- Montemarano
- Montemarciano
- Montemarzino
- Montemesola
- Montemezzo
- Montemignaio
- Montemiletto
- Montemilone
- Montemitro
- Montemonaco
- Montemurlo
- Montemurro
- Montenars
- Montenero di Bisaccia
- Montenero Sabino
- Montenero Val Cocchiara
- Montenerodomo
- Monteodorisio
- Montepaone
- Monteparano
- Monteprandone
- Montepulciano
- Monterchi
- Montereale
- Montereale Valcellina
- Monterenzio
- Monteriggioni
- Monteroduni
- Monteroni d'Arbia
- Monteroni di Lecce
- Monterosi
- Monterosso al Mare
- Monterosso Almo
- Monterosso Calabro
- Monterosso Grana
- Monterotondo
- Monterotondo Marittimo
- Monterubbiano
- Montesano Salentino
- Montesano sulla Marcellana
- Montesarchio
- Montescaglioso
- Montescano
- Montescheno
- Montescudaio
- Montescudo-Monte Colombo
- Montese
- Montesegale
- Montesilvano
- Montespertoli
- Monteu da Po
- Monteu Roero
- Montevago
- Montevarchi
- Montevecchia
- Monteverde
- Monteverdi Marittimo
- Monteviale
- Montezemolo
- Monti
- Montiano
- Monticelli Brusati
- Monticelli d'Ongina
- Monticelli Pavese
- Monticello Brianza
- Monticello Conte Otto
- Monticello d'Alba
- Montichiari
- Monticiano
- Montieri
- Montiglio Monferrato
- Montignoso
- Montirone
- Montjovet
- Montodine
- Montoggio
- Montone
- Montopoli di Sabina
- Montopoli in Val d'Arno
- Montorfano
- Montorio al Vomano
- Montorio nei Frentani
- Montorio Romano
- Montoro
- Montorso Vicentino
- Montottone
- Montresta
- Montù Beccaria
- Monvalle
- Monza
- Monzambano
- Monzuno
- Moos in Passeier
- Morano Calabro
- Morano sul Po
- Moransengo
- Moraro
- Morazzone
- Morbegno
- Morbello
- Morciano di Leuca
- Morciano di Romagna
- Morcone
- Mordano
- Morengo
- Mores
- Moresco
- Moretta
- Morfasso
- Morgano
- Morgex
- Morgongiori
- Mori
- Moriago della Battaglia
- Moricone
- Morigerati
- Morimondo
- Morino
- Moriondo Torinese
- Morlupo
- Mormanno
- Mornago
- Mornese
- Mornico al Serio
- Mornico Losana
- Morolo
- Morozzo
- Morra De Sanctis
- Morro d'Alba
- Morro d'Oro
- Morro Reatino
- Morrone del Sannio
- Morrovalle
- Morsano al Tagliamento
- Morsasco
- Mortara
- Mortegliano
- Morterone
- Moruzzo
- Moscazzano
- Moschiano
- Mosciano Sant'Angelo
- Moscufo
- Mossa
- Motta Baluffi
- Motta Camastra
- Motta d'Affermo
- Motta de' Conti
- Motta di Livenza
- Motta Montecorvino
- Motta San Giovanni
- Motta Santa Lucia
- Motta Sant'Anastasia
- Motta Visconti
- Mottafollone
- Mottalciata
- Motteggiana
- Mottola
- Mozzagrogna
- Mozzanica
- Mozzate
- Mozzecane
- Mozzo
- Muccia
- Muggia
- Muggiò
- Mugnano del Cardinale
- Mugnano di Napoli
- Mühlbach
- Mühlwald
- Mulazzano
- Mulazzo
- Mura
- Muravera
- Murazzano
- Murello
- Murialdo
- Murisengo
- Murlo
- Muro Leccese
- Muro Lucano
- Muros
- Muscoline
- Musei
- Musile di Piave
- Musso
- Mussolente
- Mussomeli
- Muzzana del Turgnano
- Muzzano

== N ==
- Nago-Torbole
- Nals
- Nanto
- Naples
- Narbolia
- Narcao
- Nardò
- Nardodipace
- Narni
- Naro
- Narzole
- Nasino
- Naso
- Naturns
- Natz-Schabs
- Nave
- Navelli
- Nazzano
- Ne
- Nebbiuno
- Negrar
- Neirone
- Neive
- Nembro
- Nemi
- Nemoli
- Neoneli
- Nepi
- Nereto
- Nerola
- Nervesa della Battaglia
- Nerviano
- Nespolo
- Nesso
- Netro
- Nettuno
- Neumarkt
- Neviano
- Neviano degli Arduini
- Neviglie
- Niardo
- Nibbiola
- Nibionno
- Nichelino
- Nicolosi
- Nicorvo
- Nicosia
- Nicotera
- Niederdorf
- Niella Belbo
- Niella Tanaro
- Nimis
- Niscemi
- Nissoria
- Nizza di Sicilia
- Nizza Monferrato
- Noale
- Noasca
- Nocara
- Nocciano
- Nocera Inferiore
- Nocera Superiore
- Nocera Terinese
- Nocera Umbra
- Noceto
- Noci
- Nociglia
- Noepoli
- Nogara
- Nogaredo
- Nogarole Rocca
- Nogarole Vicentino
- Noicattaro
- Nola
- Nole
- Noli
- Nomaglio
- Nomi
- Nonantola
- None
- Nonio
- Noragugume
- Norbello
- Norcia
- Norma
- Nosate
- Notaresco
- Noto
- Nova Milanese
- Nova Siri
- Novafeltria
- Novaledo
- Novalesa
- Novara
- Novara di Sicilia
- Novate Mezzola
- Novate Milanese
- Nove
- Novedrate
- Novellara
- Novello
- Noventa di Piave
- Noventa Padovana
- Noventa Vicentina
- Novi di Modena
- Novi Ligure
- Novi Velia
- Noviglio
- Novoli
- Nucetto
- Nughedu San Nicolò
- Nughedu Santa Vittoria
- Nule
- Nulvi
- Numana
- Nuoro
- Nurachi
- Nuragus
- Nurallao
- Nuraminis
- Nureci
- Nurri
- Nus
- Nusco
- Nuvolento
- Nuvolera
- Nuxis

== O ==
- Occhieppo Inferiore
- Occhieppo Superiore
- Occhiobello
- Occimiano
- Ocre
- Odalengo Grande
- Odalengo Piccolo
- Oderzo
- Odolo
- Ofena
- Offagna
- Offanengo
- Offida
- Offlaga
- Oggebbio
- Oggiona con Santo Stefano
- Oggiono
- Oglianico
- Ogliastro Cilento
- Olang
- Olbia
- Olcenengo
- Oldenico
- Oleggio
- Oleggio Castello
- Olevano di Lomellina
- Olevano Romano
- Olevano sul Tusciano
- Olgiate Comasco
- Olgiate Molgora
- Olgiate Olona
- Olginate
- Oliena
- Oliva Gessi
- Olivadi
- Oliveri
- Oliveto Citra
- Oliveto Lario
- Oliveto Lucano
- Olivetta San Michele
- Olivola
- Ollastra
- Ollolai
- Ollomont
- Olmedo
- Olmeneta
- Olmo al Brembo
- Olmo Gentile
- Oltre il Colle
- Oltressenda Alta
- Oltrona di San Mamette
- Olzai
- Ome
- Omegna
- Omignano
- Onanì
- Onano
- Oncino
- Oneta
- Onifai
- Oniferi
- Ono San Pietro
- Onore
- Onzo
- Opera
- Opi
- Oppeano
- Oppido Lucano
- Oppido Mamertina
- Orani
- Oratino
- Orbassano
- Orbetello
- Orciano Pisano
- Orco Feglino
- Ordona
- Orero
- Orgiano
- Orgosolo
- Oria
- Oricola
- Origgio
- Orino
- Orio al Serio
- Orio Canavese
- Orio Litta
- Oriolo
- Oriolo Romano
- Oristano
- Ormea
- Ormelle
- Ornago
- Ornavasso
- Ornica
- Orosei
- Orotelli
- Orria
- Orroli
- Orsago
- Orsara Bormida
- Orsara di Puglia
- Orsenigo
- Orsogna
- Orsomarso
- Orta di Atella
- Orta Nova
- Orta San Giulio
- Ortacesus
- Orte
- Ortelle
- Ortezzano
- Ortignano Raggiolo
- Ortona
- Ortona dei Marsi
- Ortovero
- Ortucchio
- Ortueri
- Orune
- Orvieto
- Orvinio
- Orzinuovi
- Orzivecchi
- Osasco
- Osasio
- Oschiri
- Osidda
- Osiglia
- Osilo
- Osimo
- Osini
- Osio Sopra
- Osio Sotto
- Osnago
- Osoppo
- Ospedaletti
- Ospedaletto
- Ospedaletto d'Alpinolo
- Ospedaletto Euganeo
- Ospedaletto Lodigiano
- Ospitale di Cadore
- Ospitaletto
- Ossago Lodigiano
- Ossana
- Ossi
- Ossimo
- Ossona
- Ostana
- Ostellato
- Ostiano
- Ostiglia
- Ostra
- Ostra Vetere
- Ostuni
- Otranto
- Otricoli
- Ottana
- Ottati
- Ottaviano
- Ottiglio
- Ottobiano
- Ottone
- Oulx
- Ovada
- Ovaro
- Oviglio
- Ovindoli
- Ovodda
- Oyace
- Ozegna
- Ozieri
- Ozzano dell'Emilia
- Ozzano Monferrato
- Ozzero

== P ==
- Pabillonis
- Pace del Mela
- Paceco
- Pacentro
- Pachino
- Paciano
- Padenghe sul Garda
- Paderna
- Paderno d'Adda
- Paderno del Grappa
- Paderno Dugnano
- Paderno Franciacorta
- Paderno Ponchielli
- Padria
- Padru
- Padua
- Padula
- Paduli
- Paesana
- Paese
- Pagani
- Paganico Sabino
- Pagazzano
- Pagliara
- Paglieta
- Pagnacco
- Pagno
- Pagnona
- Pago del Vallo di Lauro
- Pago Veiano
- Paisco Loveno
- Paitone
- Paladina
- Palagano
- Palagianello
- Palagiano
- Palagonia
- Palaia
- Palanzano
- Palata
- Palau
- Palazzago
- Palazzo Adriano
- Palazzo Canavese
- Palazzo Pignano
- Palazzo San Gervasio
- Palazzolo Acreide
- Palazzolo dello Stella
- Palazzolo sull'Oglio
- Palazzolo Vercellese
- Palazzuolo sul Senio
- Palena
- Palermiti
- Palermo
- Palestrina
- Palestro
- Paliano
- Palizzi
- Pallagorio
- Pallanzeno
- Pallare
- Palma Campania
- Palma di Montechiaro
- Palmanova
- Palmariggi
- Palmas Arborea
- Palmi
- Palmiano
- Palmoli
- Palo del Colle
- Palombara Sabina
- Palombaro
- Palomonte
- Palosco
- Palù
- Palù del Fersina
- Paludi
- Paluzza
- Pamparato
- Pancalieri
- Pancarana
- Panchià
- Pandino
- Panettieri
- Panicale
- Pannarano
- Panni
- Pantelleria
- Pantigliate
- Paola
- Paolisi
- Papasidero
- Papozze
- Parabiago
- Parabita
- Paratico
- Parella
- Parenti
- Parete
- Pareto
- Parghelia
- Parlasco
- Parma
- Parodi Ligure
- Paroldo
- Parolise
- Parona
- Parrano
- Parre
- Partanna
- Partinico
- Partschins
- Paruzzaro
- Parzanica
- Pasian di Prato
- Pasiano di Pordenone
- Paspardo
- Passerano Marmorito
- Passignano sul Trasimeno
- Passirano
- Pastena
- Pastorano
- Pastrengo
- Pasturana
- Pasturo
- Paterno
- Paternò
- Paterno Calabro
- Paternopoli
- Patrica
- Pattada
- Patti
- Patù
- Pau
- Paularo
- Pauli Arbarei
- Paulilatino
- Paullo
- Paupisi
- Pavarolo
- Pavia
- Pavia di Udine
- Pavone Canavese
- Pavone del Mella
- Pavullo nel Frignano
- Pazzano
- Peccioli
- Pecetto di Valenza
- Pecetto Torinese
- Pedara
- Pedaso
- Pedavena
- Pedemonte
- Pederobba
- Pedesina
- Pedivigliano
- Pedrengo
- Peglio (Province of Como)
- Peglio (Province of Pesaro and Urbino)
- Pegognaga
- Peia
- Peio
- Pelago
- Pella
- Pellegrino Parmense
- Pellezzano
- Pellizzano
- Pelugo
- Penango
- Penna in Teverina
- Penna San Giovanni
- Penna Sant'Andrea
- Pennabilli
- Pennadomo
- Pennapiedimonte
- Penne
- Pentone
- Perano
- Perarolo di Cadore
- Percha
- Percile
- Perdasdefogu
- Perdaxius
- Perdifumo
- Pereto
- Perfugas
- Pergine Valsugana
- Pergola
- Perinaldo
- Perito
- Perledo
- Perletto
- Perlo
- Perloz
- Pernumia
- Pero
- Perosa Argentina
- Perosa Canavese
- Perrero
- Persico Dosimo
- Pertengo
- Pertica Alta
- Pertica Bassa
- Pertosa
- Pertusio
- Perugia
- Pesaro
- Pescaglia
- Pescantina
- Pescara
- Pescarolo ed Uniti
- Pescasseroli
- Pescate
- Pesche
- Peschici
- Peschiera Borromeo
- Peschiera del Garda
- Pescia
- Pescina
- Pesco Sannita
- Pescocostanzo
- Pescolanciano
- Pescopagano
- Pescopennataro
- Pescorocchiano
- Pescosansonesco
- Pescosolido
- Pessano con Bornago
- Pessina Cremonese
- Pessinetto
- Petacciato
- Petilia Policastro
- Petina
- Petralia Soprana
- Petralia Sottana
- Petrella Salto
- Petrella Tifernina
- Petriano
- Petriolo
- Petritoli
- Petrizzi
- Petronà
- Petrosino
- Petruro Irpino
- Pettenasco
- Pettinengo
- Pettineo
- Pettoranello del Molise
- Pettorano sul Gizio
- Pettorazza Grimani
- Peveragno
- Pezzana
- Pezzaze
- Pezzolo Valle Uzzone
- Pfalzen
- Pfitsch
- Piacenza
- Piacenza d'Adige
- Piadena Drizzona
- Piaggine
- Pian Camuno
- Piana Crixia
- Piana degli Albanesi
- Piana di Monte Verna
- Piancastagnaio
- Piancogno
- Piandimeleto
- Piane Crati
- Pianella
- Pianello del Lario
- Pianello Val Tidone
- Pianengo
- Pianezza
- Pianezze
- Pianfei
- Pianico
- Pianiga
- Piano di Sorrento
- Pianopoli
- Pianoro
- Piansano
- Piantedo
- Piario
- Piasco
- Piateda
- Piatto
- Piazza al Serchio
- Piazza Armerina
- Piazza Brembana
- Piazzatorre
- Piazzola sul Brenta
- Piazzolo
- Picciano
- Picerno
- Picinisco
- Pico
- Piea
- Piedicavallo
- Piedimonte Etneo
- Piedimonte Matese
- Piedimonte San Germano
- Piedimulera
- Piegaro
- Pienza
- Pieranica
- Pietra de' Giorgi
- Pietra Ligure
- Pietra Marazzi
- Pietrabbondante
- Pietrabruna
- Pietracamela
- Pietracatella
- Pietracupa
- Pietradefusi
- Pietraferrazzana
- Pietrafitta
- Pietragalla
- Pietralunga
- Pietramelara
- Pietramontecorvino
- Pietranico
- Pietrapaola
- Pietrapertosa
- Pietraperzia
- Pietraporzio
- Pietraroja
- Pietrarubbia
- Pietrasanta
- Pietrastornina
- Pietravairano
- Pietrelcina
- Pieve a Nievole
- Pieve Albignola
- Pieve del Cairo
- Pieve di Bono-Prezzo
- Pieve di Cadore
- Pieve di Cento
- Pieve di Soligo
- Pieve di Teco
- Pieve d'Olmi
- Pieve Emanuele
- Pieve Fissiraga
- Pieve Fosciana
- Pieve Ligure
- Pieve Porto Morone
- Pieve San Giacomo
- Pieve Santo Stefano
- Pieve Tesino
- Pieve Torina
- Pieve Vergonte
- Pievepelago
- Piglio
- Pigna
- Pignataro Interamna
- Pignataro Maggiore
- Pignola
- Pignone
- Pigra
- Pila
- Pimentel
- Pimonte
- Pinarolo Po
- Pinasca
- Pincara
- Pinerolo
- Pineto
- Pino d'Asti
- Pino Torinese
- Pinzano al Tagliamento
- Pinzolo
- Piobbico
- Piobesi d'Alba
- Piobesi Torinese
- Piode
- Pioltello
- Piombino
- Piombino Dese
- Pioraco
- Piossasco
- Piovà Massaia
- Piove di Sacco
- Piovene Rocchette
- Piozzano
- Piozzo
- Piraino
- Pisa
- Pisano
- Piscina
- Piscinas
- Pisciotta
- Pisogne
- Pisoniano
- Pisticci
- Pistoia
- Pitigliano
- Piubega
- Piuro
- Piverone
- Pizzale
- Pizzighettone
- Pizzo
- Pizzoferrato
- Pizzoli
- Pizzone
- Pizzoni
- Placanica
- Plataci
- Platania
- Platì
- Plaus
- Plesio
- Ploaghe
- Plodio
- Pocapaglia
- Pocenia
- Podenzana
- Podenzano
- Pofi
- Poggiardo
- Poggibonsi
- Poggio a Caiano
- Poggio Torriana
- Poggio Bustone
- Poggio Catino
- Poggio Imperiale
- Poggio Mirteto
- Poggio Moiano
- Poggio Nativo
- Poggio Picenze
- Poggio Renatico
- Poggio Rusco
- Poggio San Lorenzo
- Poggio San Marcello
- Poggio San Vicino
- Poggio Sannita
- Poggiodomo
- Poggiofiorito
- Poggiomarino
- Poggioreale
- Poggiorsini
- Poggiridenti
- Pogliano Milanese
- Pognana Lario
- Pognano
- Pogno
- Poirino
- Pojana Maggiore
- Polaveno
- Polcenigo
- Polesella
- Polesine Zibello
- Poli
- Polia
- Policoro
- Polignano a Mare
- Polinago
- Polino
- Polistena
- Polizzi Generosa
- Polla
- Pollein
- Pollena Trocchia
- Pollenza
- Pollica
- Pollina
- Pollone
- Pollutri
- Polonghera
- Polpenazze del Garda
- Polverara
- Polverigi
- Pomarance
- Pomaretto
- Pomarico
- Pomaro Monferrato
- Pomarolo
- Pombia
- Pomezia
- Pomigliano d'Arco
- Pompei
- Pompeiana
- Pompiano
- Pomponesco
- Pompu
- Poncarale
- Ponderano
- Ponna
- Ponsacco
- Ponso
- Pontassieve
- Pontboset
- Pont-Canavese
- Ponte
- Ponte Buggianese
- Ponte dell'Olio
- Ponte di Legno
- Ponte di Piave
- Ponte in Valtellina
- Ponte Lambro
- Ponte nelle Alpi
- Ponte Nizza
- Ponte Nossa
- Ponte San Nicolò
- Ponte San Pietro
- Pontebba
- Pontecagnano Faiano
- Pontecchio Polesine
- Pontechianale
- Pontecorvo
- Pontecurone
- Pontedassio
- Pontedera
- Pontelandolfo
- Pontelatone
- Pontelongo
- Pontenure
- Ponteranica
- Pontestura
- Pontevico
- Pontey
- Ponti
- Ponti sul Mincio
- Pontida
- Pontinia
- Pontinvrea
- Pontirolo Nuovo
- Pontoglio
- Pontremoli
- Pont-Saint-Martin
- Ponza
- Ponzano di Fermo
- Ponzano Monferrato
- Ponzano Romano
- Ponzano Veneto
- Ponzone
- Popoli
- Poppi
- Porano
- Porcari
- Porcia
- Pordenone
- Porlezza
- Pornassio
- Porpetto
- Portacomaro
- Portalbera
- Porte
- Porte di Rendena
- Portici
- Portico di Caserta
- Portico e San Benedetto
- Portigliola
- Porto Azzurro
- Porto Ceresio
- Porto Cesareo
- Porto Empedocle
- Porto Mantovano
- Porto Recanati
- Porto San Giorgio
- Porto Sant'Elpidio
- Porto Tolle
- Porto Torres
- Porto Valtravaglia
- Porto Viro
- Portobuffolé
- Portocannone
- Portoferraio
- Portofino
- Portogruaro
- Portomaggiore
- Portopalo di Capo Passero
- Portoscuso
- Portovenere
- Portula
- Posada
- Posina
- Positano
- Possagno
- Posta
- Posta Fibreno
- Postalesio
- Postiglione
- Postua
- Potenza
- Potenza Picena
- Pove del Grappa
- Povegliano
- Povegliano Veronese
- Poviglio
- Povoletto
- Pozzaglia Sabina
- Pozzaglio ed Uniti
- Pozzallo
- Pozzilli
- Pozzo d'Adda
- Pozzol Groppo
- Pozzolengo
- Pozzoleone
- Pozzolo Formigaro
- Pozzomaggiore
- Pozzonovo
- Pozzuoli
- Pozzuolo del Friuli
- Pozzuolo Martesana
- Prad am Stilfser Joch
- Pradalunga
- Pradamano
- Pradleves
- Pragelato
- Prags
- Praia a Mare
- Praiano
- Pralboino
- Prali
- Pralormo
- Pralungo
- Pramaggiore
- Pramollo
- Prarolo
- Prarostino
- Prasco
- Prascorsano
- Prata Camportaccio
- Prata d'Ansidonia
- Prata di Pordenone
- Prata di Principato Ultra
- Prata Sannita
- Pratella
- Pratiglione
- Prato
- Prato Carnico
- Prato Sesia
- Pratola Peligna
- Pratola Serra
- Pratovecchio Stia
- Pravisdomini
- Pray
- Prazzo
- Precenicco
- Preci
- Predaia
- Predappio
- Predazzo
- Predore
- Predosa
- Preganziol
- Pregnana Milanese
- Prelà
- Premana
- Premariacco
- Premeno
- Premia
- Premilcuore
- Premolo
- Premosello-Chiovenda
- Preone
- Prepotto
- Pré-Saint-Didier
- Preseglie
- Presenzano
- Presezzo
- Presicce
- Pressana
- Pretoro
- Prettau
- Prevalle
- Prezza
- Priero
- Prignano Cilento
- Prignano sulla Secchia
- Primaluna
- Primiero San Martino di Castrozza
- Priocca
- Priola
- Priolo Gargallo
- Priverno
- Prizzi
- Proceno
- Procida
- Propata
- Proserpio
- Prossedi
- Provaglio d'Iseo
- Provaglio Val Sabbia
- Proveis
- Provvidenti
- Prunetto
- Puegnago sul Garda
- Puglianello
- Pula
- Pulfero
- Pulsano
- Pumenengo
- Pusiano
- Putifigari
- Putignano

== Q ==
- Quadrelle
- Quadri
- Quagliuzzo
- Qualiano
- Quaranti
- Quaregna Cerreto
- Quargnento
- Quarna Sopra
- Quarna Sotto
- Quarona
- Quarrata
- Quart
- Quarto
- Quarto d'Altino
- Quartu Sant'Elena
- Quartucciu
- Quassolo
- Quattordio
- Quattro Castella
- Quero Vas
- Quiliano
- Quincinetto
- Quindici
- Quingentole
- Quintano
- Quinto di Treviso
- Quinto Vercellese
- Quinto Vicentino
- Quinzano d'Oglio
- Quistello

== R ==
- Rabbi
- Racale
- Racalmuto
- Racconigi
- Raccuja
- Radda in Chianti
- Raddusa
- Radicofani
- Radicondoli
- Raffadali
- Ragalna
- Ragogna
- Ragoli
- Ragusa
- Raiano
- Ramacca
- Rancio Valcuvia
- Ranco
- Randazzo
- Ranica
- Ranzanico
- Ranzo
- Rapagnano
- Rapallo
- Rapino
- Rapolano Terme
- Rapolla
- Rapone
- Rasen-Antholz
- Rassa
- Rasura
- Ratschings
- Ravanusa
- Ravarino
- Ravascletto
- Ravello
- Ravenna
- Raveo
- Raviscanina
- Re
- Rea
- Realmonte
- Reana del Rojale
- Reano
- Recale
- Recanati
- Recco
- Recetto
- Recoaro Terme
- Redavalle
- Redondesco
- Refrancore
- Refrontolo
- Regalbuto
- Reggello
- Reggio Calabria
- Reggio Emilia
- Reggiolo
- Reino
- Reitano
- Remanzacco
- Remedello
- Renate
- Rende
- Resana
- Rescaldina
- Resia
- Resiutta
- Resuttano
- Retorbido
- Revello
- Revigliasco d'Asti
- Revine Lago
- Revò
- Rezzago
- Rezzato
- Rezzo
- Rezzoaglio
- Rhêmes-Notre-Dame
- Rhêmes-Saint-Georges
- Rho
- Riace
- Rialto
- Riano
- Riardo
- Ribera
- Ribordone
- Ricadi
- Ricaldone
- Riccia
- Riccione
- Riccò del Golfo di Spezia
- Ricengo
- Ricigliano
- Riese Pio X
- Riesi
- Rieti
- Riffian
- Rifreddo
- Rignano Flaminio
- Rignano Garganico
- Rignano sull'Arno
- Rigolato
- Rimella
- Rimini
- Rio
- Rio Saliceto
- Riofreddo
- Riola Sardo
- Riolo Terme
- Riolunato
- Riomaggiore
- Rionero in Vulture
- Rionero Sannitico
- Ripa Teatina
- Ripabottoni
- Ripacandida
- Ripalimosani
- Ripalta Arpina
- Ripalta Cremasca
- Ripalta Guerina
- Riparbella
- Ripatransone
- Ripe San Ginesio
- Ripi
- Riposto
- Rittana
- Ritten
- Riva del Garda
- Riva di Solto
- Riva Ligure
- Riva presso Chieri
- Rivalba
- Rivalta Bormida
- Rivalta di Torino
- Rivamonte Agordino
- Rivanazzano Terme
- Rivara
- Rivarolo Canavese
- Rivarolo del Re ed Uniti
- Rivarolo Mantovano
- Rivarone
- Rivarossa
- Rive
- Rive d'Arcano
- Rivello
- Rivergaro
- Rivignano Teor
- Rivisondoli
- Rivodutri
- Rivoli
- Rivoli Veronese
- Rivolta d'Adda
- Rizziconi
- Riva del Po
- Roana
- Roaschia
- Roascio
- Roasio
- Roatto
- Robassomero
- Robbiate
- Robbio
- Robecchetto con Induno
- Robecco d'Oglio
- Robecco Pavese
- Robecco sul Naviglio
- Robella
- Robilante
- Roburent
- Rocca Canavese
- Rocca Canterano
- Rocca Cigliè
- Rocca d'Arazzo
- Rocca d'Arce
- Rocca de' Baldi
- Rocca de' Giorgi
- Rocca d'Evandro
- Rocca di Botte
- Rocca di Cambio
- Rocca di Cave
- Rocca di Mezzo
- Rocca di Neto
- Rocca di Papa
- Rocca Grimalda
- Rocca Imperiale
- Rocca Massima
- Rocca Pia
- Rocca Pietore
- Rocca Priora
- Rocca San Casciano
- Rocca San Felice
- Rocca San Giovanni
- Rocca Santa Maria
- Rocca Santo Stefano
- Rocca Sinibalda
- Rocca Susella
- Roccabascerana
- Roccabernarda
- Roccabianca
- Roccabruna
- Roccacasale
- Roccadaspide
- Roccafiorita
- Roccafluvione
- Roccaforte del Greco
- Roccaforte Ligure
- Roccaforte Mondovì
- Roccaforzata
- Roccafranca
- Roccagiovine
- Roccagloriosa
- Roccagorga
- Roccalbegna
- Roccalumera
- Roccamandolfi
- Roccamena
- Roccamonfina
- Roccamontepiano
- Roccamorice
- Roccanova
- Roccantica
- Roccapalumba
- Roccapiemonte
- Roccarainola
- Roccaraso
- Roccaromana
- Roccascalegna
- Roccasecca
- Roccasecca dei Volsci
- Roccasicura
- Roccasparvera
- Roccaspinalveti
- Roccastrada
- Roccavaldina
- Roccaverano
- Roccavignale
- Roccavione
- Roccavivara
- Roccella Ionica
- Roccella Valdemone
- Rocchetta a Volturno
- Rocchetta Belbo
- Rocchetta di Vara
- Rocchetta e Croce
- Rocchetta Ligure
- Rocchetta Nervina
- Rocchetta Palafea
- Rocchetta Sant'Antonio
- Rocchetta Tanaro
- Rodano
- Roddi
- Roddino
- Rodello
- Rodeneck
- Rodengo-Saiano
- Rodero
- Rodi Garganico
- Rodì Milici
- Rodigo
- Roè Volciano
- Rofrano
- Rogeno
- Roggiano Gravina
- Roghudi
- Rogliano
- Rognano
- Rogno
- Rogolo
- Roiate
- Roio del Sangro
- Roisan
- Roletto
- Rolo
- Romagnano al Monte
- Romagnano Sesia
- Romagnese
- Romallo
- Romana
- Romanengo
- Romano Canavese
- Romano d'Ezzelino
- Romano di Lombardia
- Romans d'Isonzo
- Rombiolo
- Rome
- Romeno
- Romentino
- Rometta
- Ronago
- Roncà
- Roncade
- Roncadelle
- Roncaro
- Roncegno Terme
- Roncello
- Ronchi dei Legionari
- Ronchi Valsugana
- Ronchis
- Ronciglione
- Ronco all'Adige
- Ronco Biellese
- Ronco Briantino
- Ronco Canavese
- Ronco Scrivia
- Roncobello
- Roncoferraro
- Roncofreddo
- Roncola
- Rondanina
- Rondissone
- Ronsecco
- Ronzo-Chienis
- Ronzone
- Roppolo
- Rorà
- Rosà
- Rosarno
- Rosasco
- Rosate
- Rosazza
- Rosciano
- Roscigno
- Rose
- Rosello
- Roseto Capo Spulico
- Roseto degli Abruzzi
- Roseto Valfortore
- Rosignano Marittimo
- Rosignano Monferrato
- Rosolina
- Rosolini
- Rosora
- Rossa
- Rossana
- Rossano Veneto
- Rossiglione
- Rosta
- Rota d'Imagna
- Rota Greca
- Rotella
- Rotello
- Rotonda
- Rotondella
- Rotondi
- Rottofreno
- Rotzo
- Roure
- Rovasenda
- Rovato
- Rovegno
- Rovellasca
- Rovello Porro
- Roverbella
- Roverchiara
- Roverè della Luna
- Roverè Veronese
- Roveredo di Guà
- Roveredo in Piano
- Rovereto
- Rovescala
- Rovetta
- Roviano
- Rovigo
- Rovito
- Rovolon
- Rozzano
- Rubano
- Rubiana
- Rubiera
- Ruda
- Rudiano
- Rueglio
- Ruffano
- Ruffia
- Ruffrè-Mendola
- Rufina
- Ruinas
- Rumo
- Ruoti
- Russi
- Rutigliano
- Rutino
- Ruviano
- Ruvo del Monte
- Ruvo di Puglia

== S ==
- Sabaudia
- Sabbio Chiese
- Sabbioneta
- Sacco
- Saccolongo
- Sacile
- Sacrofano
- Sadali
- Sagama
- Sagliano Micca
- Sagrado
- Sagron Mis
- Saint-Christophe
- Saint-Denis
- Saint-Marcel
- Saint-Nicolas
- Saint-Oyen
- Saint-Pierre
- Saint-Rhémy-en-Bosses
- Saint-Vincent
- Sala Baganza
- Sala Biellese
- Sala Bolognese
- Sala Comacina
- Sala Consilina
- Sala Monferrato
- Salandra
- Salaparuta
- Salara
- Salasco
- Salassa
- Salbertrand
- Salcedo
- Salcito
- Sale
- Sale delle Langhe
- Sale Marasino
- Sale San Giovanni
- Salemi
- Salento
- Salerano Canavese
- Salerano sul Lambro
- Salerno
- Salgareda
- Sali Vercellese
- Salice Salentino
- Saliceto
- Salisano
- Salizzole
- Salle
- Salmour
- Salò
- Salorno
- Salsomaggiore Terme
- Saltrio
- Saludecio
- Saluggia
- Salussola
- Saluzzo
- Salve
- Salvirola
- Salvitelle
- Salza di Pinerolo
- Salza Irpina
- Salzano
- Samarate
- Samassi
- Samatzai
- Sambuca di Sicilia
- Sambuca Pistoiese
- Sambuci
- Sambuco
- Sammichele di Bari
- Samo
- Samolaco
- Samone (Province of Trento)
- Samone (Province of Turin)
- Sampeyre
- Samugheo
- San Bartolomeo al Mare
- San Bartolomeo in Galdo
- San Bartolomeo Val Cavargna
- San Basile
- San Basilio
- San Bassano
- San Bellino
- San Benedetto Belbo
- San Benedetto dei Marsi
- San Benedetto del Tronto
- San Benedetto in Perillis
- San Benedetto Po
- San Benedetto Ullano
- San Benedetto Val di Sambro
- San Benigno Canavese
- San Bernardino Verbano
- San Biagio della Cima
- San Biagio di Callalta
- San Biagio Platani
- San Biagio Saracinisco
- San Biase
- San Bonifacio
- San Buono
- San Calogero
- San Canzian d'Isonzo
- San Carlo Canavese
- San Casciano dei Bagni
- San Casciano in Val di Pesa
- San Cassiano
- San Cataldo
- San Cesareo
- San Cesario di Lecce
- San Cesario sul Panaro
- San Chirico Nuovo
- San Chirico Raparo
- San Cipirello
- San Cipriano d'Aversa
- San Cipriano Picentino
- San Cipriano Po
- San Clemente
- San Colombano al Lambro
- San Colombano Belmonte
- San Colombano Certénoli
- San Cono
- San Cosmo Albanese
- San Costantino Albanese
- San Costantino Calabro
- San Costanzo
- San Cristoforo
- San Damiano al Colle
- San Damiano d'Asti
- San Damiano Macra
- San Daniele del Friuli
- San Daniele Po
- San Demetrio Corone
- San Demetrio ne' Vestini
- San Didero
- San Donà di Piave
- San Donaci
- San Donato di Lecce
- San Donato di Ninea
- San Donato Milanese
- San Donato Val di Comino
- San Dorligo della Valle
- San Fele
- San Felice a Cancello
- San Felice Circeo
- San Felice del Benaco
- San Felice del Molise
- San Felice sul Panaro
- San Ferdinando
- San Ferdinando di Puglia
- San Fermo della Battaglia
- San Fili
- San Filippo del Mela
- San Fior
- San Fiorano
- San Floriano del Collio
- San Floro
- San Francesco al Campo
- San Fratello
- San Gavino Monreale
- San Gemini
- San Genesio ed Uniti
- San Gennaro Vesuviano
- San Germano Chisone
- San Germano Vercellese
- San Gervasio Bresciano
- San Giacomo degli Schiavoni
- San Giacomo delle Segnate
- San Giacomo Filippo
- San Giacomo Vercellese
- San Gillio
- San Gimignano
- San Ginesio
- San Giorgio a Cremano
- San Giorgio a Liri
- San Giorgio Albanese
- San Giorgio Canavese
- San Giorgio del Sannio
- San Giorgio della Richinvelda
- San Giorgio delle Pertiche
- San Giorgio di Lomellina
- San Giorgio Bigarello
- San Giorgio di Nogaro
- San Giorgio di Piano
- San Giorgio in Bosco
- San Giorgio Ionico
- San Giorgio La Molara
- San Giorgio Lucano
- San Giorgio Monferrato
- San Giorgio Morgeto
- San Giorgio Piacentino
- San Giorgio Scarampi
- San Giorgio su Legnano
- San Giorio di Susa
- San Giovanni a Piro
- San Giovanni al Natisone
- San Giovanni Bianco
- San Giovanni del Dosso
- San Giovanni di Gerace
- San Giovanni Gemini
- San Giovanni Ilarione
- San Giovanni in Croce
- San Giovanni in Fiore
- San Giovanni in Galdo
- San Giovanni in Marignano
- San Giovanni in Persiceto
- San Giovanni Incarico
- San Giovanni la Punta
- San Giovanni Lipioni
- San Giovanni Lupatoto
- San Giovanni Rotondo
- San Giovanni Suergiu
- San Giovanni Teatino
- San Giovanni Valdarno
- San Giuliano del Sannio
- San Giuliano di Puglia
- San Giuliano Milanese
- San Giuliano Terme
- San Giuseppe Jato
- San Giuseppe Vesuviano
- San Giustino
- San Giusto Canavese
- San Godenzo
- San Gregorio da Sassola
- San Gregorio di Catania
- San Gregorio d'Ippona
- San Gregorio Magno
- San Gregorio Matese
- San Gregorio nelle Alpi
- San Lazzaro di Savena
- San Leo
- San Leonardo
- San Leucio del Sannio
- San Lorenzello
- San Lorenzo
- San Lorenzo al Mare
- San Lorenzo Bellizzi
- San Lorenzo del Vallo
- San Lorenzo Dorsino
- San Lorenzo in Campo
- San Lorenzo Isontino
- San Lorenzo Maggiore
- San Lorenzo Nuovo
- San Luca
- San Lucido
- San Lupo
- San Mango d'Aquino
- San Mango Piemonte
- San Mango sul Calore
- San Marcellino
- San Marcello
- San Marcello Piteglio
- San Marco Argentano
- San Marco d'Alunzio
- San Marco dei Cavoti
- San Marco Evangelista
- San Marco in Lamis
- San Marco la Catola
- San Martin de Tor
- San Martino al Tagliamento
- San Martino Alfieri
- San Martino Buon Albergo
- San Martino Canavese
- San Martino d'Agri
- San Martino dall'Argine
- San Martino del Lago
- San Martino di Finita
- San Martino di Lupari
- San Martino di Venezze
- San Martino in Pensilis
- San Martino in Rio
- San Martino in Strada
- San Martino Sannita
- San Martino Siccomario
- San Martino sulla Marrucina
- San Martino Valle Caudina
- San Marzano di San Giuseppe
- San Marzano Oliveto
- San Marzano sul Sarno
- San Massimo
- San Maurizio Canavese
- San Maurizio d'Opaglio
- San Mauro Castelverde
- San Mauro Cilento
- San Mauro di Saline
- San Mauro Forte
- San Mauro la Bruca
- San Mauro Marchesato
- San Mauro Pascoli
- San Mauro Torinese
- San Michele al Tagliamento
- San Michele all'Adige
- San Michele di Ganzaria
- San Michele di Serino
- San Michele Mondovì
- San Michele Salentino
- San Miniato
- San Nazario
- San Nazzaro
- San Nazzaro Sesia
- San Nazzaro Val Cavargna
- San Nicandro Garganico
- San Nicola Arcella
- San Nicola Baronia
- San Nicola da Crissa
- San Nicola dell'Alto
- San Nicola la Strada
- San Nicola Manfredi
- San Nicolò d'Arcidano
- San Nicolò di Comelico
- San Nicolò Gerrei
- San Pancrazio Salentino
- San Paolo
- San Paolo Albanese
- San Paolo Bel Sito
- San Paolo d'Argon
- San Paolo di Civitate
- San Paolo di Jesi
- San Paolo Solbrito
- San Pellegrino Terme
- San Pier d'Isonzo
- San Pier Niceto
- San Piero Patti
- San Pietro a Maida
- San Pietro al Natisone
- San Pietro al Tanagro
- San Pietro Apostolo
- San Pietro Avellana
- San Pietro Clarenza
- San Pietro di Cadore
- San Pietro di Caridà
- San Pietro di Feletto
- San Pietro di Morubio
- San Pietro in Amantea
- San Pietro in Cariano
- San Pietro in Casale
- San Pietro in Cerro
- San Pietro in Gu
- San Pietro in Guarano
- San Pietro in Lama
- San Pietro Infine
- San Pietro Mosezzo
- San Pietro Mussolino
- San Pietro Val Lemina
- San Pietro Vernotico
- San Pietro Viminario
- San Pio delle Camere
- San Polo dei Cavalieri
- San Polo d'Enza
- San Polo di Piave
- San Polo Matese
- San Ponso
- San Possidonio
- San Potito Sannitico
- San Potito Ultra
- San Prisco
- San Procopio
- San Prospero
- San Quirico d'Orcia
- San Quirino
- San Raffaele Cimena
- San Roberto
- San Rocco al Porto
- San Romano in Garfagnana
- San Rufo
- San Salvatore di Fitalia
- San Salvatore Monferrato
- San Salvatore Telesino
- San Salvo
- San Sebastiano al Vesuvio
- San Sebastiano Curone
- San Sebastiano da Po
- San Secondo di Pinerolo
- San Secondo Parmense
- San Severino Lucano
- San Severino Marche
- San Severo
- San Siro
- San Sossio Baronia
- San Sostene
- San Sosti
- San Sperate
- San Tammaro
- San Teodoro (Province of Messina)
- San Teodoro (Province of Olbia-Tempio)
- San Tomaso Agordino
- San Valentino in Abruzzo Citeriore
- San Valentino Torio
- San Venanzo
- San Vendemiano
- San Vero Milis
- San Vincenzo
- San Vincenzo La Costa
- San Vincenzo Valle Roveto
- San Vitaliano
- San Vito
- San Vito al Tagliamento
- San Vito al Torre
- San Vito Chietino
- San Vito dei Normanni
- San Vito di Cadore
- San Vito di Fagagna
- San Vito di Leguzzano
- San Vito Lo Capo
- San Vito Romano
- San Vito sullo Ionio
- San Vittore del Lazio
- San Vittore Olona
- San Zeno di Montagna
- San Zeno Naviglio
- San Zenone al Lambro
- San Zenone al Po
- San Zenone degli Ezzelini
- Sanarica
- Sand in Taufers
- Sandigliano
- Sandrigo
- Sanfrè
- Sanfront
- Sangano
- Sangiano
- Sangineto
- Sanguinetto
- Sanluri
- Sannazzaro de' Burgondi
- Sannicandro di Bari
- Sannicola
- Sanremo
- Sansepolcro
- Santa Brigida
- Santa Caterina Albanese
- Santa Caterina dello Ionio
- Santa Caterina Villarmosa
- Santa Cesarea Terme
- Santa Crestina Gherdëina
- Santa Cristina d'Aspromonte
- Santa Cristina e Bissone
- Santa Cristina Gela
- Santa Croce Camerina
- Santa Croce del Sannio
- Santa Croce di Magliano
- Santa Croce sull'Arno
- Santa Domenica Talao
- Santa Domenica Vittoria
- Santa Elisabetta
- Santa Fiora
- Santa Flavia
- Santa Giuletta
- Santa Giusta
- Santa Giustina
- Santa Giustina in Colle
- Santa Luce
- Santa Lucia del Mela
- Santa Lucia di Piave
- Santa Lucia di Serino
- Santa Margherita di Belice
- Santa Margherita di Staffora
- Santa Margherita Ligure
- Santa Maria a Monte
- Santa Maria a Vico
- Santa Maria Capua Vetere
- Santa Maria Coghinas
- Santa Maria del Cedro
- Santa Maria del Molise
- Santa Maria della Versa
- Santa Maria di Licodia
- Santa Maria di Sala
- Santa Maria Hoè
- Santa Maria Imbaro
- Santa Maria la Carità
- Santa Maria la Fossa
- Santa Maria la Longa
- Santa Maria Maggiore
- Santa Maria Nuova
- Santa Marina
- Santa Marina Salina
- Santa Marinella
- Santa Ninfa
- Santa Paolina
- Santa Severina
- Santa Sofia
- Santa Sofia d'Epiro
- Santa Teresa di Riva
- Santa Teresa Gallura
- Santa Venerina
- Santa Vittoria d'Alba
- Santa Vittoria in Matenano
- Santadi
- Sant'Agapito
- Sant'Agata Bolognese
- Sant'Agata de' Goti
- Sant'Agata del Bianco
- Sant'Agata di Esaro
- Sant'Agata di Militello
- Sant'Agata di Puglia
- Sant'Agata Feltria
- Sant'Agata Fossili
- Sant'Agata li Battiati
- Sant'Agata sul Santerno
- Sant'Agnello
- Sant'Albano Stura
- Sant'Alessio con Vialone
- Sant'Alessio in Aspromonte
- Sant'Alessio Siculo
- Sant'Alfio
- Sant'Ambrogio di Torino
- Sant'Ambrogio di Valpolicella
- Sant'Ambrogio sul Garigliano
- Sant'Anastasia
- Sant'Anatolia di Narco
- Sant'Andrea Apostolo dello Ionio
- Sant'Andrea del Garigliano
- Sant'Andrea di Conza
- Sant'Andrea Frius
- Sant'Angelo a Cupolo
- Sant'Angelo a Fasanella
- Sant'Angelo a Scala
- Sant'Angelo all'Esca
- Sant'Angelo d'Alife
- Sant'Angelo dei Lombardi
- Sant'Angelo del Pesco
- Sant'Angelo di Brolo
- Sant'Angelo di Piove di Sacco
- Sant'Angelo in Pontano
- Sant'Angelo in Vado
- Sant'Angelo Le Fratte
- Sant'Angelo Limosano
- Sant'Angelo Lodigiano
- Sant'Angelo Lomellina
- Sant'Angelo Muxaro
- Sant'Angelo Romano
- Sant'Anna Arresi
- Sant'Anna d'Alfaedo
- Sant'Antimo
- Sant'Antioco
- Sant'Antonino di Susa
- Sant'Antonio Abate
- Sant'Antonio di Gallura
- Sant'Apollinare
- Sant'Arcangelo
- Santarcangelo di Romagna
- Sant'Arcangelo Trimonte
- Sant'Arpino
- Sant'Arsenio
- Sante Marie
- Sant'Egidio alla Vibrata
- Sant'Egidio del Monte Albino
- Sant'Elena
- Sant'Elena Sannita
- Sant'Elia a Pianisi
- Sant'Elia Fiumerapido
- Sant'Elpidio a Mare
- Santena
- Santeramo in Colle
- Sant'Eufemia a Maiella
- Sant'Eufemia d'Aspromonte
- Sant'Eusanio del Sangro
- Sant'Eusanio Forconese
- Santhià
- Santi Cosma e Damiano
- Sant'Ilario dello Ionio
- Sant'Ilario d'Enza
- Sant'Ippolito
- Santo Stefano al Mare
- Santo Stefano Belbo
- Santo Stefano d'Aveto
- Santo Stefano del Sole
- Santo Stefano di Cadore
- Santo Stefano di Camastra
- Santo Stefano di Magra
- Santo Stefano di Rogliano
- Santo Stefano di Sessanio
- Santo Stefano in Aspromonte
- Santo Stefano Lodigiano
- Santo Stefano Quisquina
- Santo Stefano Roero
- Santo Stefano Ticino
- Santo Stino di Livenza
- Sant'Olcese
- Santomenna
- Sant'Omero
- Sant'Omobono Terme
- Sant'Onofrio
- Santopadre
- Sant'Oreste
- Santorso
- Sant'Orsola Terme
- Santu Lussurgiu
- Sant'Urbano
- Sanza
- Sanzeno
- Saonara
- Saponara
- Sappada
- Sapri
- Saracena
- Saracinesco
- Sarcedo
- Sarconi
- Sardara
- Sardigliano
- Sarego
- Sarezzano
- Sarezzo
- Sarmato
- Sarmede
- Sarnano
- Sarnico
- Sarno
- Sarnonico
- Sarntal
- Saronno
- Sarre
- Sarroch
- Sarsina
- Sarteano
- Sartirana Lomellina
- Sarule
- Sarzana
- Sassano
- Sassari
- Sassello
- Sassetta
- Sassinoro
- Sasso di Castalda
- Sasso Marconi
- Sassocorvaro Auditore
- Sassofeltrio
- Sassoferrato
- Sassuolo
- Satriano
- Satriano di Lucania
- Sauris
- Sauze di Cesana
- Sauze d'Oulx
- Sava
- Savelli
- Saviano
- Savigliano
- Savignano Irpino
- Savignano sul Panaro
- Savignano sul Rubicone
- Savignone
- Saviore dell'Adamello
- Savoca
- Savogna
- Savogna d'Isonzo
- Savoia di Lucania
- Savona
- Scafa
- Scafati
- Scagnello
- Scala
- Scala Coeli
- Scaldasole
- Scalea
- Scalenghe
- Scaletta Zanclea
- Scampitella
- Scandale
- Scandiano
- Scandicci
- Scandolara Ravara
- Scandolara Ripa d'Oglio
- Scandriglia
- Scanno
- Scano di Montiferro
- Scansano
- Scanzano Jonico
- Scanzorosciate
- Scapoli
- Scarlino
- Scarmagno
- Scarnafigi
- Scarperia e San Piero
- Scerni
- Scheggia e Pascelupo
- Scheggino
- Schenna
- Schiavi di Abruzzo
- Schiavon
- Schignano
- Schilpario
- Schio
- Schivenoglia
- Schlanders
- Schluderns
- Schnals
- Sciacca
- Sciara
- Scicli
- Scido
- Scigliano
- Scilla
- Scillato
- Sciolze
- Scisciano
- Sclafani Bagni
- Scontrone
- Scopa
- Scopello
- Scoppito
- Scordia
- Scorrano
- Scorzè
- Scurcola Marsicana
- Scurelle
- Scurzolengo
- Seborga
- Secinaro
- Seclì
- Secugnago
- Sedegliano
- Sedico
- Sedilo
- Sedini
- Sedriano
- Sedrina
- Sefro
- Segariu
- Seggiano
- Segni
- Segonzano
- Segrate
- Segusino
- Selargius
- Selci
- Selegas
- Sella Giudicarie
- Sellano
- Sellero
- Sellia
- Sellia Marina
- Sëlva
- Selva di Cadore
- Selva di Progno
- Selvazzano Dentro
- Selvino
- Semestene
- Semiana
- Seminara
- Semproniano
- Senago
- Seneghe
- Senerchia
- Seniga
- Senigallia
- Senis
- Senise
- Sèn Jan di Fassa
- Senna Comasco
- Senna Lodigiana
- Sennariolo
- Sennori
- Senorbì
- Sepino
- Sequals
- Seravezza
- Serdiana
- Seregno
- Seren del Grappa
- Sergnano
- Seriate
- Serina
- Serino
- Serle
- Sermide e Felonica
- Sermoneta
- Sernaglia della Battaglia
- Sernio
- Serole
- Serra d'Aiello
- Serra de' Conti
- Serra Riccò
- Serra San Bruno
- Serra San Quirico
- Serra Sant'Abbondio
- Serracapriola
- Serradifalco
- Serralunga d'Alba
- Serralunga di Crea
- Serramanna
- Serramazzoni
- Serramezzana
- Serramonacesca
- Serrapetrona
- Serrara Fontana
- Serrastretta
- Serrata
- Serravalle a Po
- Serravalle di Chienti
- Serravalle Langhe
- Serravalle Pistoiese
- Serravalle Scrivia
- Serravalle Sesia
- Serre
- Serrenti
- Serri
- Serrone
- Sersale
- Servigliano
- Sessa Aurunca
- Sessa Cilento
- Sessame
- Sessano del Molise
- Sesta Godano
- Sestino
- Sesto al Reghena
- Sesto Calende
- Sesto Campano
- Sesto ed Uniti
- Sesto Fiorentino
- Sesto San Giovanni
- Sestola
- Sestri Levante
- Sestriere
- Sestu
- Settala
- Settefrati
- Settime
- Settimo Milanese
- Settimo Rottaro
- Settimo San Pietro
- Settimo Torinese
- Settimo Vittone
- Settingiano
- Setzu
- Seui
- Seulo
- Seveso
- Sexten
- Sezzadio
- Sezze
- Sfruz
- Sgonico
- Sgurgola
- Siamaggiore
- Siamanna
- Siano
- Siapiccia
- Sicignano degli Alburni
- Siculiana
- Siddi
- Siderno
- Siena
- Sigillo
- Signa
- Silanus
- Silea
- Siligo
- Siliqua
- Silius
- Sillano Giuncugnano
- Sillavengo
- Silvano d'Orba
- Silvano Pietra
- Silvi
- Simala
- Simaxis
- Simbario
- Simeri Crichi
- Sinagra
- Sinalunga
- Sindia
- Sini
- Sinio
- Siniscola
- Sinnai
- Sinopoli
- Sirignano
- Siris
- Sirmione
- Sirolo
- Sirone
- Sirtori
- Sissa Trecasali
- Siurgus Donigala
- Siziano
- Sizzano
- Smerillo
- Soave
- Socchieve
- Soddì
- Sogliano al Rubicone
- Sogliano Cavour
- Soglio
- Soiano del Lago
- Solagna
- Solarino
- Solaro
- Solarolo
- Solarolo Rainerio
- Solarussa
- Solbiate con Cagno
- Solbiate Arno
- Solbiate Olona
- Soldano
- Soleminis
- Solero
- Solesino
- Soleto
- Solferino
- Soliera
- Solignano
- Solofra
- Solonghello
- Solopaca
- Solto Collina
- Solza
- Somaglia
- Somano
- Somma Lombardo
- Somma Vesuviana
- Sommacampagna
- Sommariva del Bosco
- Sommariva Perno
- Sommatino
- Sommo
- Sona
- Soncino
- Sondalo
- Sondrio
- Songavazzo
- Sonico
- Sonnino
- Sora
- Soraga di Fassa
- Soragna
- Sorano
- Sorbo San Basile
- Sorbo Serpico
- Sorbolo Mezzani
- Sordevolo
- Sordio
- Soresina
- Sorgà
- Sorgono
- Sori
- Sorianello
- Soriano Calabro
- Soriano nel Cimino
- Sorico
- Soriso
- Sorisole
- Sormano
- Sorradile
- Sorrento
- Sorso
- Sortino
- Sospiro
- Sospirolo
- Sossano
- Sostegno
- Sotto il Monte Giovanni XXIII
- Sover
- Soverato
- Sovere
- Soveria Mannelli
- Soveria Simeri
- Soverzene
- Sovicille
- Sovico
- Sovizzo
- Sovramonte
- Sozzago
- Spadafora
- Spadola
- Sparanise
- Sparone
- Specchia
- Spello
- Sperlinga
- Sperlonga
- Sperone
- Spessa
- Spezzano Albanese
- Spezzano della Sila
- Spiazzo
- Spigno Monferrato
- Spigno Saturnia
- Spilamberto
- Spilimbergo
- Spilinga
- Spinadesco
- Spinazzola
- Spinea
- Spineda
- Spinete
- Spineto Scrivia
- Spinetoli
- Spino d'Adda
- Spinone al Lago
- Spinoso
- Spirano
- Spoleto
- Spoltore
- Spongano
- Spormaggiore
- Sporminore
- Spotorno
- Spresiano
- Spriana
- Squillace
- Squinzano
- St. Leonhard in Passeier
- St. Lorenzen
- St. Martin in Passeier
- St. Pankraz
- Staffolo
- Stagno Lombardo
- Staiti
- Stalettì
- Stanghella
- Staranzano
- Statte
- Stazzano
- Stazzema
- Stazzona
- Stefanaconi
- Stella
- Stella Cilento
- Stellanello
- Stenico
- Sternatia
- Sterzing
- Stezzano
- Stienta
- Stigliano
- Stignano
- Stilfs
- Stilo
- Stimigliano
- Stintino
- Stio
- Stornara
- Stornarella
- Storo
- Stra
- Stradella
- Strambinello
- Strambino
- Strangolagalli
- Stregna
- Strembo
- Stresa
- Strevi
- Striano
- Strona
- Stroncone
- Strongoli
- Stroppiana
- Stroppo
- Strozza
- Sturno
- Suardi
- Subbiano
- Subiaco
- Succivo
- Sueglio
- Suelli
- Suello
- Suisio
- Sulbiate
- Sulmona
- Sulzano
- Sumirago
- Summonte
- Suni
- Suno
- Supersano
- Supino
- Surano
- Surbo
- Susa
- Susegana
- Sustinente
- Sutera
- Sutri
- Sutrio
- Suvereto
- Suzzara
- Syracuse

== T ==
- Taceno
- Tadasuni
- Taggia
- Tagliacozzo
- Taglio di Po
- Tagliolo Monferrato
- Taibon Agordino
- Taino
- Taipana
- Talamello
- Talamona
- Talana
- Taleggio
- Talla
- Talmassons
- Tambre
- Taormina
- Tarano
- Taranta Peligna
- Tarantasca
- Taranto
- Tarcento
- Tarquinia
- Tarsia
- Tartano
- Tarvisio
- Tarzo
- Tassarolo
- Taufers im Münstertal
- Taurano
- Taurasi
- Taurianova
- Taurisano
- Tavagnacco
- Tavagnasco
- Tavazzano con Villavesco
- Tavenna
- Taverna
- Tavernerio
- Tavernola Bergamasca
- Tavernole sul Mella
- Taviano
- Tavigliano
- Tavoleto
- Tavullia
- Teana
- Teano
- Teggiano
- Teglio
- Teglio Veneto
- Telese Terme
- Telgate
- Telti
- Telve
- Telve di Sopra
- Tempio Pausania
- Temù
- Tenna
- Tenno
- Teolo
- Teora
- Teramo
- Terdobbiate
- Terelle
- Terenten
- Terenzo
- Tergu
- Terlan
- Terlizzi
- Terme Vigliatore
- Termini Imerese
- Termoli
- Ternate
- Ternengo
- Terni
- Terno d'Isola
- Terracina
- Terragnolo
- Terralba
- Terranova da Sibari
- Terranova dei Passerini
- Terranova di Pollino
- Terranova Sappo Minulio
- Terranuova Bracciolini
- Terrasini
- Terrassa Padovana
- Terravecchia
- Terrazzo
- Terre d'Adige
- Terre del Reno
- Terre Roveresche
- Terricciola
- Terruggia
- Tertenia
- Terzigno
- Terzo
- Terzo d'Aquileia
- Terzolas
- Terzorio
- Tesero
- Tessennano
- Testico
- Teti
- Teulada
- Teverola
- Tezze sul Brenta
- Thiene
- Thiesi
- Tiana
- Ticengo
- Ticineto
- Tiers
- Tiggiano
- Tiglieto
- Tigliole
- Tignale
- Tinnura
- Tione degli Abruzzi
- Tione di Trento
- Tirano
- Tiriolo
- Tirol
- Tisens
- Tissi
- Tito
- Tivoli
- Tizzano Val Parma
- Toano
- Toblach
- Tocco Caudio
- Tocco da Casauria
- Toceno
- Todi
- Toffia
- Toirano
- Tolentino
- Tolfa
- Tollegno
- Tollo
- Tolmezzo
- Tolve
- Tombolo
- Ton
- Tonara
- Tonco
- Tonengo
- Tonezza del Cimone
- Tora e Piccilli
- Torano Castello
- Torano Nuovo
- Torbole Casaglia
- Torcegno
- Torchiara
- Torchiarolo
- Torella dei Lombardi
- Torella del Sannio
- Torgiano
- Torgnon
- Torino di Sangro
- Toritto
- Torlino Vimercati
- Tornaco
- Tornareccio
- Tornata
- Tornimparte
- Torno
- Tornolo
- Toro
- Torpè
- Torraca
- Torralba
- Torrazza Coste
- Torrazza Piemonte
- Torrazzo
- Torre Annunziata
- Torre Beretti e Castellaro
- Torre Boldone
- Torre Bormida
- Torre Cajetani
- Torre Canavese
- Torre d'Arese
- Torre de' Busi
- Torre de' Negri
- Torre de' Passeri
- Torre de' Picenardi
- Torre de' Roveri
- Torre del Greco
- Torre di Mosto
- Torre di Ruggiero
- Torre di Santa Maria
- Torre d'Isola
- Torre Le Nocelle
- Torre Mondovì
- Torre Orsaia
- Torre Pallavicina
- Torre Pellice
- Torre San Giorgio
- Torre San Patrizio
- Torre Santa Susanna
- Torreano
- Torrebelvicino
- Torrebruna
- Torrecuso
- Torreglia
- Torregrotta
- Torremaggiore
- Torrenova
- Torresina
- Torretta
- Torrevecchia Pia
- Torrevecchia Teatina
- Torri del Benaco
- Torri di Quartesolo
- Torri in Sabina
- Torrice
- Torricella
- Torricella del Pizzo
- Torricella in Sabina
- Torricella Peligna
- Torricella Sicura
- Torricella Verzate
- Torriglia
- Torrile
- Torrioni
- Torrita di Siena
- Torrita Tiberina
- Tortolì
- Tortona
- Tortora
- Tortorella
- Tortoreto
- Tortorici
- Torviscosa
- Toscolano-Maderno
- Tossicia
- Tovo di Sant'Agata
- Tovo San Giacomo
- Trabia
- Tradate
- Tramatza
- Trambileno
- Tramin an der Weinstraße
- Tramonti
- Tramonti di Sopra
- Tramonti di Sotto
- Tramutola
- Trana
- Trani
- Traona
- Trapani
- Trappeto
- Trarego Viggiona
- Trasacco
- Trasaghis
- Trasquera
- Tratalias
- Travacò Siccomario
- Travagliato
- Travedona-Monate
- Traversella
- Traversetolo
- Traves
- Travesio
- Travo
- Trebaseleghe
- Trebisacce
- Trecase
- Trecastagni
- Trecastelli
- Trecate
- Trecchina
- Trecenta
- Tredozio
- Treglio
- Tregnago
- Treia
- Treiso
- Tremestieri Etneo
- Tremezzina
- Tremiti Islands
- Tremosine sul Garda
- Trentinara
- Trento
- Trentola-Ducenta
- Trenzano
- Treppo Grande
- Treppo Ligosullo
- Trepuzzi
- Trequanda
- Tresana
- Trescore Balneario
- Trescore Cremasco
- Tresignana
- Tresivio
- Tresnuraghes
- Trevenzuolo
- Trevi
- Trevi nel Lazio
- Trevico
- Treviglio
- Trevignano
- Trevignano Romano
- Treville
- Treviolo
- Treviso
- Treviso Bresciano
- Trezzano Rosa
- Trezzano sul Naviglio
- Trezzo sull'Adda
- Trezzo Tinella
- Trezzone
- Tre Ville
- Tribano
- Tribiano
- Tribogna
- Tricarico
- Tricase
- Tricerro
- Tricesimo
- Trichiana
- Triei
- Trieste
- Triggiano
- Trigolo
- Trinità
- Trinità d'Agultu e Vignola
- Trinitapoli
- Trino
- Triora
- Tripi
- Trisobbio
- Trissino
- Triuggio
- Trivento
- Trivigliano
- Trivignano Udinese
- Trivigno
- Trivolzio
- Trofarello
- Troia
- Troina
- Tromello
- Trontano
- Tronzano Lago Maggiore
- Tronzano Vercellese
- Tropea
- Trovo
- Truccazzano
- Truden im Naturpark
- Tscherms
- Tufara
- Tufillo
- Tufino
- Tufo
- Tuglie
- Tuili
- Tula
- Tuoro sul Trasimeno
- Turania
- Turano Lodigiano
- Turate
- Turbigo
- Turi
- Turin
- Turri
- Turriaco
- Turrivalignani
- Tursi
- Tusa
- Tuscania

== U ==
- Ubiale Clanezzo
- Uboldo
- Ucria
- Udine
- Ugento
- Uggiano la Chiesa
- Uggiate-Trevano
- Ula Tirso
- Ulassai
- Ulten
- Umbertide
- Umbriatico
- Unsere Liebe Frau im Walde-St. Felix
- Urago d'Oglio
- Uras
- Urbana
- Urbania
- Urbe
- Urbino
- Urbisaglia
- Urgnano
- Uri
- Urtijëi
- Ururi
- Urzulei
- Uscio
- Usellus
- Usini
- Usmate Velate
- Ussana
- Ussaramanna
- Ussassai
- Usseaux
- Usseglio
- Ussita
- Ustica
- Uta
- Uzzano

== V ==
- Vaccarizzo Albanese
- Vacone
- Vacri
- Vadena
- Vado Ligure
- Vagli Sotto
- Vaglia
- Vaglio Basilicata
- Vaglio Serra
- Vahrn
- Vaiano
- Vaiano Cremasco
- Vaie
- Vailate
- Vairano Patenora
- Vajont
- Val Brembilla
- Val della Torre
- Val di Chy
- Val di Nizza
- Val di Zoldo
- Val Liona
- Val Masino
- Val Rezzo
- Valbondione
- Valbrembo
- Valbrevenna
- Valbrona
- Valchiusa
- Valdagno
- Valdaone
- Valdastico
- Valdengo
- Valderice
- Valdidentro
- Valdieri
- Valdina
- Valdisotto
- Valdobbiadene
- Valduggia
- Valeggio
- Valeggio sul Mincio
- Valentano
- Valenza
- Valenzano
- Valera Fratta
- Valfabbrica
- Valfenera
- Valfloriana
- Valfornace
- Valfurva
- Valganna
- Valgioie
- Valgoglio
- Valgrana
- Valgreghentino
- Valgrisenche
- Valguarnera Caropepe
- Vallada Agordina
- Vallanzengo
- Vallarsa
- Vallata
- Valle Agricola
- Valle Cannobina
- Valle Castellana
- Valle dell'Angelo
- Valle di Cadore
- Valle di Maddaloni
- Valle Lomellina
- Valdilana
- Valle Salimbene
- Valle San Nicolao
- Vallebona
- Vallecorsa
- Vallecrosia
- Valledolmo
- Valledoria
- Vallefiorita
- Vallefoglia
- Vallelaghi
- Vallelonga
- Vallelunga Pratameno
- Vallemaio
- Vallepietra
- Vallerano
- Vallermosa
- Vallerotonda
- Vallesaccarda
- Valleve
- Valli del Pasubio
- Vallinfreda
- Vallio Terme
- Vallo della Lucania
- Vallo di Nera
- Vallo Torinese
- Valloriate
- Valmacca
- Valmadrera
- Valmontone
- Valmorea
- Valmozzola
- Valnegra
- Valpelline
- Valperga
- Valprato Soana
- Valsamoggia
- Valsavarenche
- Valsinni
- Valsolda
- Valstagna
- Valstrona
- Valtopina
- Valtorta
- Valtournenche
- Valva
- Valvarrone
- Valvasone Arzene
- Valverde (Province of Catania)
- Valvestino
- Vanzaghello
- Vanzago
- Vanzone con San Carlo
- Vaprio d'Adda
- Vaprio d'Agogna
- Varallo Pombia
- Varallo Sesia
- Varano Borghi
- Varano de' Melegari
- Varapodio
- Varazze
- Varco Sabino
- Varedo
- Varenna
- Varese
- Varese Ligure
- Varisella
- Varmo
- Varsi
- Varzi
- Varzo
- Vasanello
- Vasia
- Vasto
- Vastogirardi
- Vauda Canavese
- Vazzano
- Vazzola
- Vecchiano
- Vedano al Lambro
- Vedano Olona
- Vedelago
- Vedeseta
- Veduggio con Colzano
- Veggiano
- Veglie
- Veglio
- Vejano
- Veleso
- Velezzo Lomellina
- Velletri
- Vellezzo Bellini
- Velo d'Astico
- Velo Veronese
- Venafro
- Venaria Reale
- Venarotta
- Venasca
- Venaus
- Vendone
- Vendrogno
- Venegono Inferiore
- Venegono Superiore
- Venetico
- Veniano
- Venice
- Venosa
- Ventasso
- Venticano
- Ventimiglia
- Ventimiglia di Sicilia
- Ventotene
- Venzone
- Verano Brianza
- Verbania
- Verbicaro
- Vercana
- Verceia
- Vercelli
- Vercurago
- Verdellino
- Verdello
- Verderio
- Verduno
- Vergato
- Verghereto
- Vergiate
- Vermezzo
- Vermiglio
- Vernante
- Vernasca
- Vernate
- Vernazza
- Vernio
- Vernole
- Verolanuova
- Verolavecchia
- Verolengo
- Veroli
- Verona
- Veronella
- Verrayes
- Verrès
- Verretto
- Verrone
- Verrua Po
- Verrua Savoia
- Vertemate con Minoprio
- Vertova
- Verucchio
- Vervio
- Verzegnis
- Verzino
- Verzuolo
- Vescovana
- Vescovato
- Vesime
- Vespolate
- Vessalico
- Vestenanova
- Vestignè
- Vestone
- Vetralla
- Vetto
- Vezza d'Alba
- Vezza d'Oglio
- Vezzano Ligure
- Vezzano sul Crostolo
- Vezzi Portio
- Viadana
- Viadanica
- Viagrande
- Viale
- Vialfrè
- Viano
- Viareggio
- Viarigi
- Vibo Valentia
- Vibonati
- Vicalvi
- Vicari
- Vicchio
- Vicenza
- Vico del Gargano
- Vico Equense
- Vico nel Lazio
- Vicoforte
- Vicoli
- Vicolungo
- Vicopisano
- Vicovaro
- Viddalba
- Vidigulfo
- Vidor
- Vidracco
- Vieste
- Vietri di Potenza
- Vietri sul Mare
- Viganò
- Vigano San Martino
- Vigarano Mainarda
- Vigasio
- Vigevano
- Viggianello
- Viggiano
- Viggiù
- Vighizzolo d'Este
- Vigliano Biellese
- Vigliano d'Asti
- Vignale Monferrato
- Vignanello
- Vignate
- Vignola
- Vignola-Falesina
- Vignole Borbera
- Vignolo
- Vignone
- Vigo di Cadore
- Vigodarzere
- Vigolo
- Vigolzone
- Vigone
- Vigonovo
- Vigonza
- Viguzzolo
- Villa Bartolomea
- Villa Basilica
- Villa Biscossi
- Villa Carcina
- Villa Castelli
- Villa Celiera
- Villa Collemandina
- Villa Cortese
- Villa d'Adda
- Villa d'Almè
- Villa del Bosco
- Villa del Conte
- Villa di Briano
- Villa di Chiavenna
- Villa di Serio
- Villa di Tirano
- Villa d'Ogna
- Villa Estense
- Villa Faraldi
- Villa Guardia
- Villa Lagarina
- Villa Latina
- Villa Literno
- Villa Minozzo
- Villa San Giovanni
- Villa San Giovanni in Tuscia
- Villa San Pietro
- Villa San Secondo
- Villa Santa Lucia
- Villa Santa Lucia degli Abruzzi
- Villa Santa Maria
- Villa Sant'Angelo
- Villa Sant'Antonio
- Villa Santina
- Villa Santo Stefano
- Villa Verde
- Villabate
- Villachiara
- Villacidro
- Villadeati
- Villadose
- Villadossola
- Villafalletto
- Villafranca d'Asti
- Villafranca di Verona
- Villafranca in Lunigiana
- Villafranca Padovana
- Villafranca Piemonte
- Villafranca Sicula
- Villafranca Tirrena
- Villafrati
- Villaga
- Villagrande Strisaili
- Villalago
- Villalba
- Villalfonsina
- Villalvernia
- Villamagna
- Villamaina
- Villamar
- Villamarzana
- Villamassargia
- Villamiroglio
- Villanders
- Villanova Biellese
- Villanova Canavese
- Villanova d'Albenga
- Villanova d'Ardenghi
- Villanova d'Asti
- Villanova del Battista
- Villanova del Ghebbo
- Villanova del Sillaro
- Villanova di Camposampiero
- Villanova Marchesana
- Villanova Mondovì
- Villanova Monferrato
- Villanova Monteleone
- Villanova Solaro
- Villanova sull'Arda
- Villanova Truschedu
- Villanova Tulo
- Villanovaforru
- Villanovafranca
- Villanterio
- Villanuova sul Clisi
- Villaperuccio
- Villapiana
- Villaputzu
- Villar Dora
- Villar Focchiardo
- Villar Pellice
- Villar Perosa
- Villar San Costanzo
- Villarbasse
- Villarboit
- Villareggia
- Villaricca
- Villaromagnano
- Villarosa
- Villasalto
- Villasanta
- Villasimius
- Villasor
- Villaspeciosa
- Villastellone
- Villata
- Villaurbana
- Villavallelonga
- Villaverla
- Ville d'Anaunia
- Ville di Fiemme
- Villeneuve
- Villesse
- Villetta Barrea
- Villette
- Villimpenta
- Villnöß
- Villongo
- Villorba
- Vilminore di Scalve
- Vimercate
- Vimodrone
- Vinadio
- Vinchiaturo
- Vinchio
- Vinci
- Vinovo
- Vintl
- Vinzaglio
- Viola
- Vione
- Virle Piemonte
- Visano
- Vische
- Visciano
- Visco
- Visone
- Visso
- Vistarino
- Vistrorio
- Vita
- Viterbo
- Viticuso
- Vito d'Asio
- Vitorchiano
- Vittoria
- Vittorio Veneto
- Vittorito
- Vittuone
- Vitulano
- Vitulazio
- Viù
- Vivaro
- Vivaro Romano
- Viverone
- Vizzini
- Vizzola Ticino
- Vizzolo Predabissi
- Vo'
- Vobarno
- Vobbia
- Vocca
- Vodo di Cadore
- Voghera
- Voghiera
- Vogogna
- Volano
- Volla
- Volongo
- Volpago del Montello
- Volpara
- Volpedo
- Volpeglino
- Volpiano
- Völs am Schlern
- Volta Mantovana
- Voltaggio
- Voltago Agordino
- Volterra
- Voltido
- Volturara Appula
- Volturara Irpina
- Volturino
- Volvera
- Vöran
- Vottignasco

== W ==
- Waidbruck
- Welsberg-Taisten
- Welschnofen

== Z ==
- Zaccanopoli
- Zafferana Etnea
- Zagarise
- Zagarolo
- Zambrone
- Zandobbio
- Zanè
- Zanica
- Zapponeta
- Zavattarello
- Zeccone
- Zeddiani
- Zelbio
- Zelo Buon Persico
- Zelo Surrigone
- Zeme
- Zenevredo
- Zenson di Piave
- Zerba
- Zerbo
- Zerbolò
- Zerfaliu
- Zeri
- Zermeghedo
- Zero Branco
- Zevio
- Ziano di Fiemme
- Ziano Piacentino
- Zibido San Giacomo
- Zignago
- Zimella
- Zimone
- Zinasco
- Zoagli
- Zocca
- Zogno
- Zola Predosa
- Zollino
- Zone
- Zoppè di Cadore
- Zoppola
- Zovencedo
- Zubiena
- Zuccarello
- Zugliano
- Zuglio
- Zumaglia
- Zumpano
- Zungoli
- Zungri

== See also ==
- List of municipalities of Italy, by province
