= 2021 Italy wildfires =

Series of fires in Italy

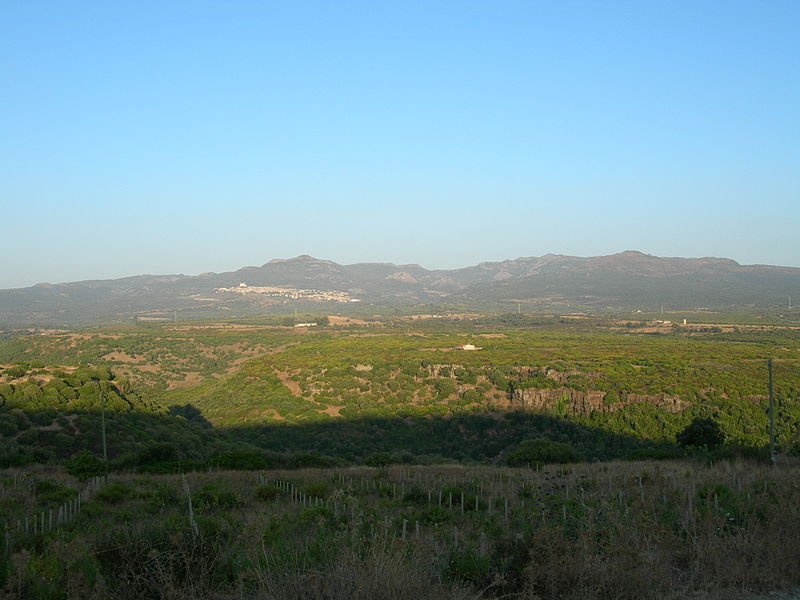
- The Montiferru at Cuglieri
- Date: 24 July – early September 2021
- Location: Italy: particularly Calabria, Sardinia and Sicily

Statistics
- Total area: 50,000 hectares

Impacts
- Deaths: 6
- Cost: €5.6 billion (£4.7 billion) (2021)

Ignition
- Cause: Organized arson

Multiple wildfires broke out across Italy in the summer of 2021. The first wildfires were reported in Sardinia on 24 July, which would go on to become one of the worst affected regions along with Calabria, where five people died, and Sicily, which recorded one further fatality. Wildfires in Lazio on 17 August damaged the estate of the presidential summer residence.

By late August, additional minor wildfires had spread to the regions of Abruzzo, Apulia, Basilicata, Campania, Liguria and Tuscany. Heavy rainfall in September extinguished the last of the wildfires. The majority of the wildfires were the result of organised arson, with criminal investigations into the fires ongoing.

== Timeline by region ==
=== Abruzzo ===
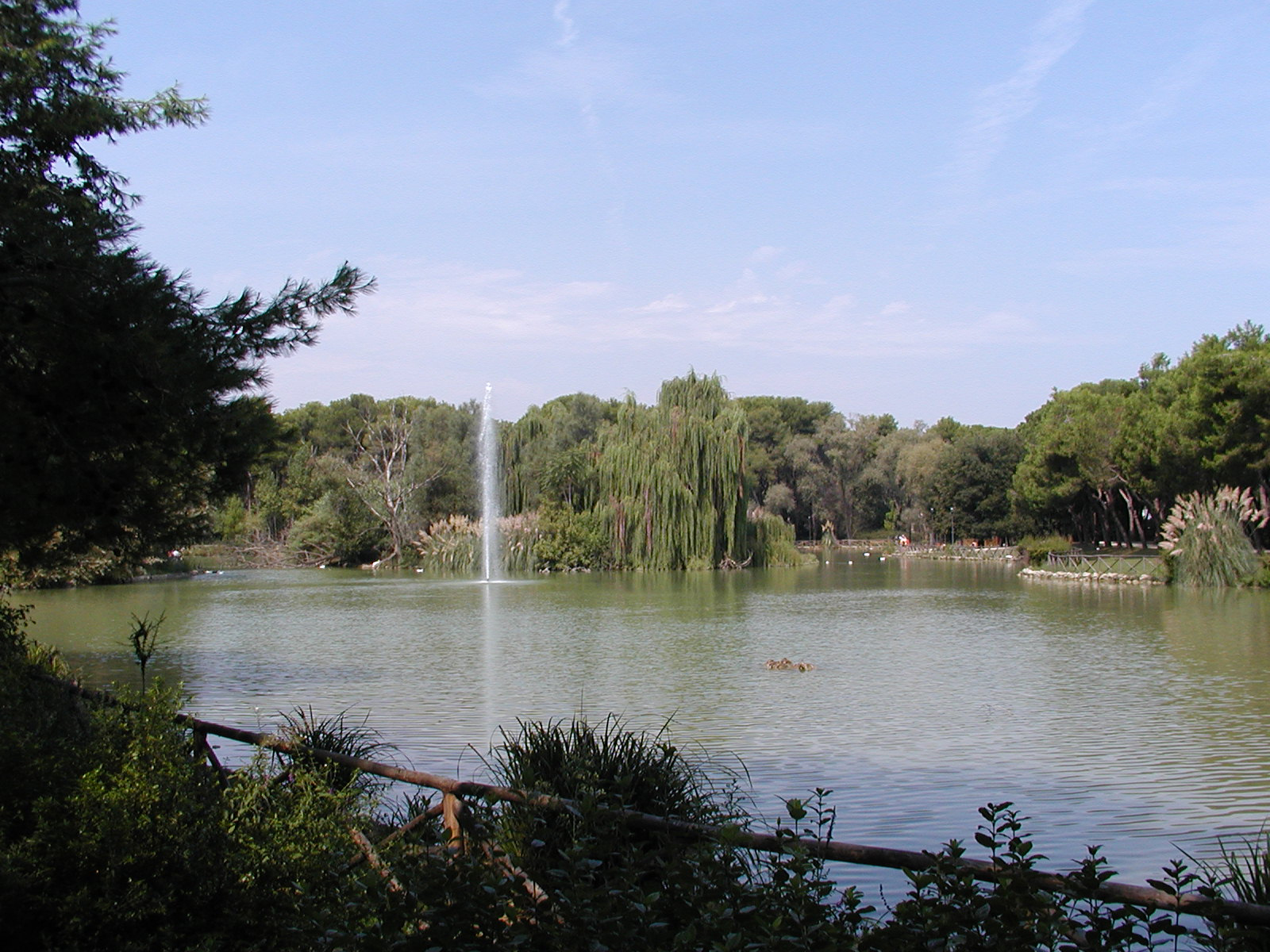
View of the Nature Reserve Pineta Dannunziana in Abruzzo

Multiple wildfires broke out in Abruzzo, mainly in city of Pescara, in mid-August.

=== Basilicata ===
Multiple wildfires broke out in Basilicata by mid-August.

=== Calabria ===
On 10 August, the prefecture of Reggio Calabria requested and obtained the intervention of the Italian Army to contribute to the activities in progress to extinguish the fires that broke out in different areas of the province. On 11 August, there are many arsons on the Aspromonte and the sanctuary of the Madonna di Polsi, frazione of San Luca (Reggio Calabria), is almost surrounded by fires. On 12 August, the wildfires are devastating the Province of Reggio Calabria, the Province of Catanzaro and the Province of Cosenza. The most serious situation among the Comuni di San Luca, Cardeto, Roghudi, Roccaforte del Greco, Mammola, Gioiosa Ionica, Grotteria, San Giovanni di Gerace, Caulonia and Cittanova. Some villages have been evacuated and several rural homes have been destroyed by the flames. The president of the Region, Antonino Spirlì spoked of 59 fires still active and 70 rescue teams active in the area. On 13 August, fire extinguishing and containment operations continue in Aspromonte.

In total, five people died during the wildfires in Calabria.

=== Campania ===
Multiple wildfires had broken out in Campania by mid-August.

=== Lazio ===
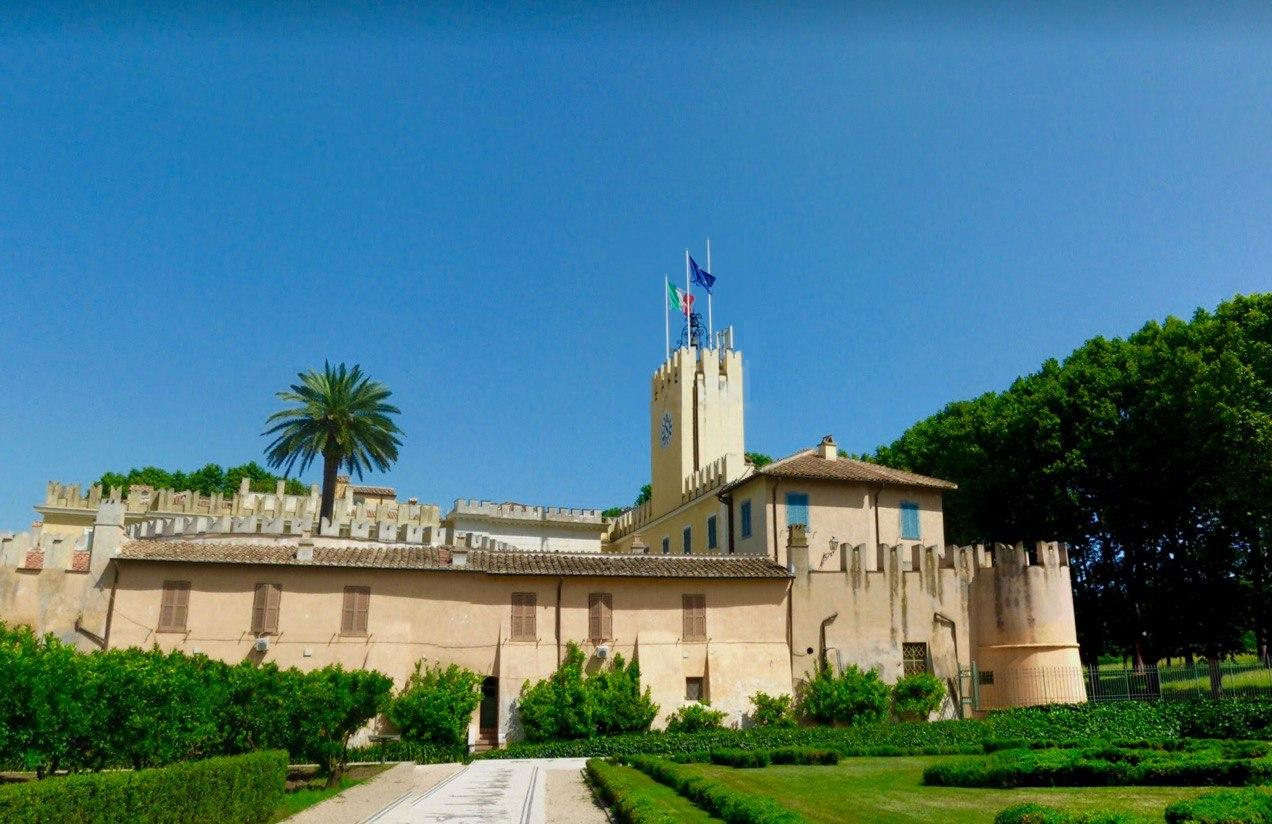
Presidential palace at Castelporziano, Lazio

On 17 August at around 0600 local time, unknown arsonists threw ignited triggers beyond the boundary wall on Via Pratica di Mare of the presidential estate of Castelporziano, the summer residence of the President of the Italian Republic. Some trees and a small portion of Mediterranean plants and shrubs immediately caught fire. Some citizens have alerted the Vigili del Fuoco. The teams of the Carabinieri and Vigili del Fuoco in force in the presidential estate arrived on the site. The damage was fortunately limited to about 20 square meters of burnt land.

=== Liguria ===
Wildfires were reported across Liguria starting in mid-August, although Liguria is one of the few Italian regions where fires occur all year round depending on humidity conditions, not to be forgotten are the fires on the mountain ridges during the winter periods.

A wildfire broke out on the morning of 17 August on the heights of Voltri, in the woods and among the Mediterranean trees. Some teams of the Genoa fire brigade, and of the volunteer wildlands firefighters corps went to the place. The thick and acrid smoke has risen from the woods above the hills of the Genoese west and is visible throughout the quartiere.

On 16 September, heavy rains fall on the region and definitely extinguish all fires. The risk of starting new fires is now very low due to the lowering of temperatures and the humid soil due to heavy rains.

=== Sardinia ===
Starting on 24 July, the Montiferru area, in Oristano province, was hit by a wildfire, which broke out between Bonarcado and Santu Lussurgiu, forcing the inhabitants of the towns of Cuglieri and Scano di Montiferro to flee for safety. It will take at least 15 years to rebuild the woods and the Mediterranean trees destroyed by the flames that have reached pastures, olive trees, sheds, barns with fodder stocks and agricultural vehicles, but also killed animals and represent a calamity costing incalculable damage to agriculture in over 20 thousand hectares burned. The millennial olive tree of Sa Tanca Manna, symbol of Cuglieri and an example of botanical archeology, was apparently destroyed by flames. However, later reports indicated that the millennial olive tree of Sa Tanca Manna may be able to survive the wildfire.

The high temperatures and the wind fueled the fire that spread quickly, first surrounding Santu Lussurgiu and then moving to Cuglieri. The small town was besieged by flames all night, displacing 200 people. The 155 inhabitants of Sennariolo, which is located a few kilometers nearby, were also displaced. At dawn the launches of water by Canadair and helicopters firefighting from the sky resumed, but after a slight respite, with the passing of the hours and with the increase in temperatures and the strength of the wind, the flames regained strength, burning everything. The fire front moved to Porto Alabe, frazione of Tresnuraghes.

The flames also reached Scano di Montiferro, where some homes were evacuated and 400 people displaced, including guests of an assistance facility for the elderly and Borore in the Province of Nuoro with 30 other evacuated families.

To extinguish the wildfires and secure the villagers, 7,500 men were employed including Sardinian Forestry Corps, Vigili del fuoco, Protezione Civile, volunteers, but also the Italian Red Cross, Carabinieri and Polizia di Stato, 7 Italian Canadair firefighting in flight, plus 2 Canadair arrived from France and 11 helicopters from the regional fleet, including the Super Puma, a Vigili del fuoco helicopter and an Italian Army helicopter. Almost 27 years have passed since the last wildfire in Montiferru was in August 1994.

On 10 August, wildfires on the border with the territories of Birori and Bortigali destroyed an area of 180 hectares. On 11 August, new wildfires reactivated in the province of Nuoro and in the Province of Ogliastra. A large front of fire has opened in Borore, in the Marghine. The Sardinian Forestry Corps, volunteers and Protezione Civile, 5 helicopters and 1 Canadair firefighting in flight were present to extinguish the wildfires. On 16 August, there were further wildfires in Gallura.

=== Sicily ===
On 12 August in Provincia di Palermo arsons attack broke out in the Madonie, in the Polizzi Generosa area, where 150 people were evacuated. Fires also in Petralia Soprana and near the Madonuzza junction, but also in Geraci Siculo and Gangi. While in the Province of Catania, at Linguaglossa, close to the Etna park, a vast wooded area was devoured by flames, which destroyed vineyards and farmhouses.

=== Tuscany ===
Multiple wildfires broke out in Tuscany in August.

== International assistance ==
The following countries offered assistance:

- France – 8 Canadair CL-415 firefighting aircraft (3 in Calabria, 2 in Sardinia, 3 in Sicily)

== Reactions ==
The President of the Italian Republic, Sergio Mattarella visited the Italian Air Force base, in Alghero, Sardinia. Subsequently, on board a helicopter, he flew over the areas of Oristano affected by the very serious arsons at the end of July on the island.

Seeing directly the devastation caused by the arsons makes us understand the immense extent of the damage caused to the lives of the affected municipalities and their territory, and the damage caused to the future of young people. Whoever is guilty has a very serious responsibility on his conscience.

— President of the Italian Republic Sergio Mattarella, 13 August 2021

Regarding the subsequent fires in Lazio which affected the presidential residence, Mattarella reiterated his condemnation for criminal acts that impacted the civil community and thanked the citizens who reported the fire and the rescue teams of the firefighters: thanks to their timely intervention they avoided very serious consequences.

The Italian prime minister Mario Draghi, in a telephone conversation with the mayor of Reggio Calabria, Giuseppe Falcomatà, has assured full support to community and to the whole of Calabria for the emergency of the fires of arson origin which, with the high temperatures, have given rise to large forest fires. highly destructives. He confirmed that the Italian government will activate a program of economic and financial support for people and businesses damaged by arson together with an extraordinary plan to reforest and secure the territory.

== Aftermath ==
=== Causes ===
On 10 August, investigations are underway by the Sardinian Forestry Corps, Carabinieri and Polizia di Stato to ascertain those responsible for the arson fires in that region. Investigations were launched on 11 August in Abruzzo, Calabria and Sicily; on 16 August in Basilicata, Campania, Liguria and Tuscany; and on 17 August in Lazio.

=== Consequences ===
Calabria declared the state of emergency for the wildfire. At the proposal of President Antonino Spirlì, the regional council approved the request to the Italian government in relation to the calamitous events resulting from the spread of forest fires over a vast territory. The resolution clarifies that the damages will be quantified following a specific survey in the municipalities concerned.

=== Financial assistance ===
No non-repayable funds will be disbursed, but economic support for projects for the forest protection and enhancement of the territory.
