= Montiferru =

Historical region of Sardinia, Italy

Coordinates: 40°13′N 8°35′E

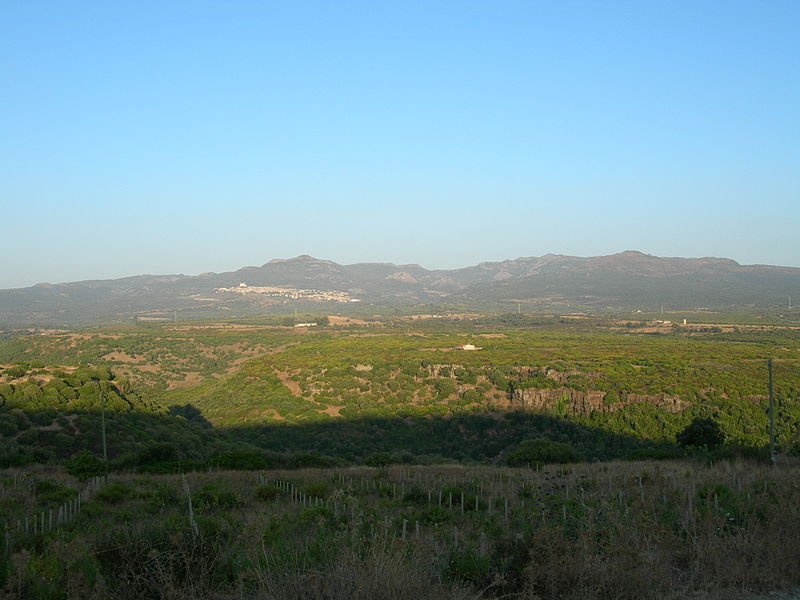
The Montiferru at Cuglieri.

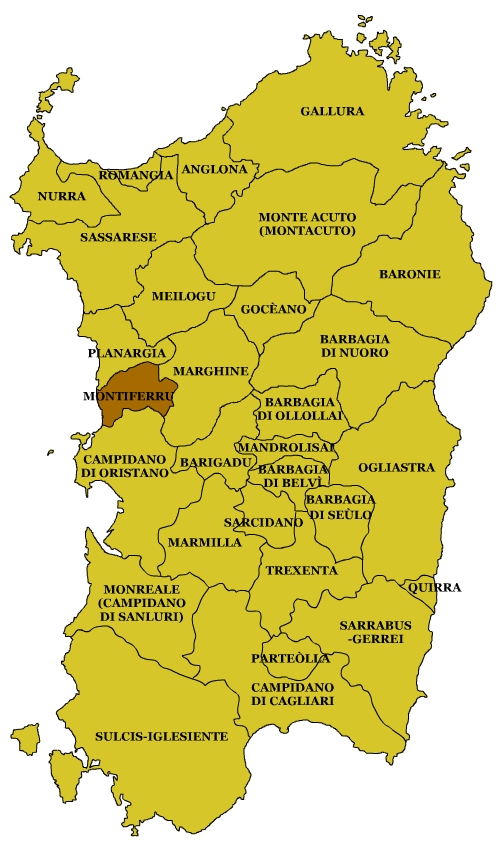
Location of Montiferru in Sardinia.

Montiferru is a historical region of central-western Sardinia, Italy. It takes its name from the eponymous extinct volcano massif, whose main peak is the Monte Urtigu (1,050 m). Extending for some 700 km^{2}, the massif had originally a maximum elevation of c. 1,600/1,700 m, later reduced due to erosion.

The volcanic origin of the area is testified by the basaltic rocks of the seaside. Water sources are frequent, rivers from the area including the Rio Mannu.

The economy is essentially rural, based on agriculture and animal husbandry. Flora goes from the Mediterranean shrubland of the coast to olive and fruit trees in the mainland, up to pine and oaks in the more elevated parts. Wildlife include wild boar, fox, Sardinian hare, European hedgehog, least weasel, marten, the rare Sardinian wildcat, vulture, carrion crow, peregrine falcon, hoopoe, little owl, Eurasian scops owl and others.

== Geology ==
The rocks of Montiferru are the remains of an extinct volcanic complex, covering an area of about 400 square kilometres (154 sq mi), that was active 3.9 to 1.6 million years ago during the Pliocene and Pleistocene epochs of the Earth's geological history. The volcanic activity was at its most intense 3.6 million years ago. The volcano erupted a wide variety of lavas including basanite, hawaiite, phonolite, mugearite, benmoreite and trachyte, as well as small amounts of basaltic andesite and basaltic trachyandesite.

== Communes ==
- Bonarcado
- Cuglieri
- Narbolia
- Paulilatino
- Santu Lussurgiu
- Scano di Montiferro
- Seneghe
- Sennariolo
