= Milis (disambiguation) =

Milis is a comune in the Province of Oristano in Sardinia, Italy.

Milis may also refer to:

- San Vero Milis, another comune in the Province of Oristano in Sardinia, Italy

== People with the surname ==
- Johannes Milis, from Verona, doctor of the laws and advocate, probably at Rome, who wrote a legal repertorium, c. 1430 – 1440
