= Edvige Carboni =

Italian Roman Catholic

Blessed Edvige Carboni TOSF
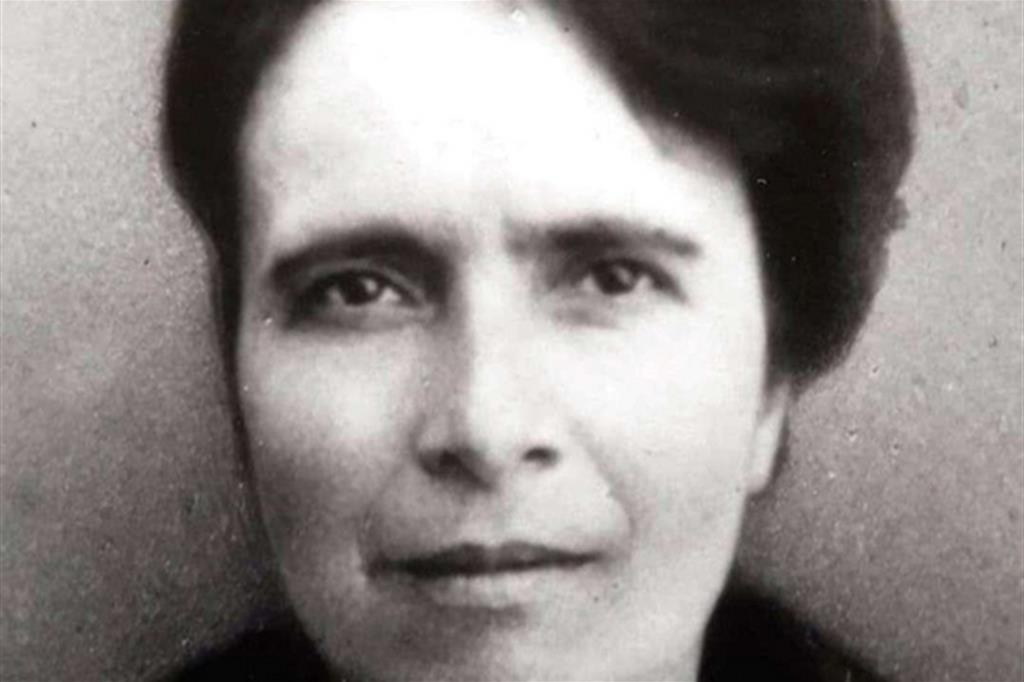
- Born: 2 May 1880; Pozzomaggiore, Sassari, Kingdom of Italy
- Died: 17 February 1952 (aged 71); Rome, Lazio, Italy
- Resting place: San Giorgio Martire, Pozzomaggiore, Italy
- Venerated in: Roman Catholic Church
- Beatified: 15 June 2019, Ippodromo Generale Eugenio Unali, Pozzomaggiore, Sassari, Italy by Cardinal Giovanni Angelo Becciu
- Feast: 17 February

Edvige Carboni (2 May 1880 – 17 February 1952) was an Italian Roman Catholic from Sardinia who relocated to Rome and became well known among the faithful and religious alike for her ecstasies and angelic visions. She recorded an extensive spiritual journal in which she recorded appearances from Jesus Christ as well as saints such as Gemma Galgani and John Bosco. Carboni was said to have experienced demonic experiences and stigmata.

== Life ==
Edvige Carboni was born in Sassari on the evening of 2 May 1880 as the second of six children to Giovanni Battista Carboni (d. 1937) and Maria Domenica Pinna (d. 1910); her sister was Paulina (b. 1895) and she also had four brothers (including Galdino (15 April 1889 – 7 March 1977)) and at least one other sister. Carboni received her baptism on the following 4 May 1880 from the vice-parish priest Sanna. She received her Confirmation in 1884 from Mgr. Eliseo Giordano and made a vow to remain chaste in 1885. She started school in 1886 and finished three grades of education.

Her mother recalled Carboni's birth and told her that on that occasion she had seen a luminous host in the monstrance and would tell her daughter this because: "If I die, you must receive Holy Communion every day and you should be very good, because Jesus, a few moments after you were born, showed me a host, as I have told you".

Her mother taught her embroidery as a child, and she would work with her father in the embroidery business. She also spent time in the convent of the Sisters of Saint Vincent in Alghero, where the nuns led a course in embroidery. Her mother's frail health saw her tend to the education and care of her younger siblings as well as other domestic duties.

Carboni made her First Communion in 1891. She wanted to become a nun in 1895, but her mother disapproved of it and she took this disapproval as a sign of the will of God. In 1895, her sister Paulina was born. From 1896, her visions of Jesus and Mary became ever more frequent. She became a professed member of the Third Order of Saint Francis in 1906 and belonged to an association known as the Friends of Saint Thérèse of the Child Jesus; she began recording her thoughts in a spiritual journal. Her mother died in 1910, and her responsibilities tripled.

In her grandmother's home remained a replica of Raphael's painting of the Blessed Virgin Mary with the Infant Jesus: she would climb a chair to reach the image and would say to the Blessed Mother: "My mother, I love you. Give me your child so that I can play with Him". Carboni was required to do the shopping due to her mother's ill health despite being fearful of having to shop in the evening. But her guardian angel appeared to her and told her: "Don't be afraid. I am with you and I keep you good company".

She attended her brother Galdino's marriage to Penelope Gerundini (8 May 1899 – 31 December 1979).

Her spiritual gifts included levitation and the reading of hearts as well as the discernment of spirits and frequent visits from the souls in Purgatory. She also had several visions of Aloysius Gonzaga and on their first encounter he asked her: "Do you know me?" to which she replied that she did not. Gonzaga said: "I am Saint Aloysius Gonzaga. I have come to tell you that I love you very much and that you should love Jesus always".

Carboni stated in her diary that once during prayer, she was visited by Benito Mussolini, former Italian dictator, who said to her: "Purgatory is terrible for me because I waited until the last moment to repent". According to her, God later informed Carboni that Mussolini's soul entered Heaven.

Carboni noted in her spiritual journal on 16 November 1938 how she received stigmata – for she wanted to suffer for the glory of God – while she recorded in her journal on 12 June 1941 her first encounter with John Bosco. Bosco even invited her to enrol as a Salesian in an appearance on 25 September 1941. Carboni also received the transverberation and recorded a case of demonic encounter in December 1941. Her experiences with the Devil became more aggressive as time progressed. On one occasion, she was kicked in the legs and on another her gold fillings were stolen. She was once confined to her bed for a while after a hammer hit her in the knees.

Carboni experienced a number of visions from saints. She began to experience bilocation in 1925, and this grew greater during World War II. In 1929, her sister Paulina found a job as a teacher in Marcellina Scalo – a small town between Rome and Tivoli. Her father did not want Paulina to leave, so the entire family relocated from Sardinia to the mainland. In 1934 she moved to Albano Laziale until the death of her father in 1937 and she finally settled in Rome in 1938. From 1941 she became part of the Confraternity of the Passion of Scala Santa in Rome. On 11 August 1941 she wrote of Jesus allowing her a view of Heaven.

Carboni spent the last fourteen years of her life living with her sister Paulina in Rome. Her final spiritual director was the Passionist priest Ignacio Parmeggiani. Her time in Rome saw her teach catechism while tending to the poor and the ill. She received praise for her piety from the Servant of God Giovanni Battista Manzella and priests such as Ernesto Maria Piovella and Felice Cappello.

On 17 February 1952, she got up in the morning to attend Mass and came home for a meal before going back to church to hear Father Lombardi preach a sermon. She and her sister arrived home via train at 8:30 pm, when she complained that she did not feel well. Her sister summoned a doctor and two priests from their parish who gave her the Last Rites. Carboni died of angina pectoris at 10:30 pm and was buried in Albano Laziale. Her grave was with that of her brother Galdino and his wife.

Her remains from a white coffin were exhumed in October 2015 for canonical inspection as part of the canonisation cause. Her remains were relocated as a result of this.

== Beatification ==
The beatification process opened in Rome in December 1968 and concluded sometime later, after having considered all of the available documents and interrogatories – this also included her spiritual journal. The cause for beatification commenced in 1968; she was accorded the title of Servant of God on 29 April 1994. Pope Francis titled her as Venerable on 4 May 2017 upon the confirmation of her life of heroic virtue. Francis later confirmed a miracle attributed to her intercession in late 2018, and she was beatified in her native Sardinia on 15 June 2019.

== See also ==
- Josefa Menéndez
