= Magomadas =

Magomadas Magumadas
- Comune
- Comune di Magomadas
- Location within Sardinia
- Coordinates: 40°16′N 8°31′E
- Country: Italy
- Region: Sardinia
- Province: Oristano (OR)

Government
  - Mayor: Paolo Puddu

Area
  - Total: 9.02 km^{2} (3.48 sq mi)
- Elevation: 263 m (863 ft)

Population (28 February 2017)
  - Total: 667
  - Density: 73.9/km^{2} (192/sq mi)
- Demonym(s): Magomadesi, Magumadesos
- Time zone: UTC+1 (CET)
  - Summer (DST): UTC+2 (CEST)
- Postal code: 09090
- Dialing code: 0785
- Website: Official website

Magomadas (Sardinian: Magumadas) is a comune (municipality) in the Province of Oristano in the Italian region Sardinia, located about 130 kilometres (81 mi) northwest of Cagliari and about 40 kilometres (25 mi) north of Oristano.

== Geography ==
Magomadas borders the following municipalities: Bosa, Flussio, Modolo, Tresnuraghes.

== History ==
The village was presumably founded by Phoenicians. The name Macomades is born by many ancient settlements around the coast of the western Mediterranean Sea. In Hebrew, of all contemporary semitic languages the most closely related to ancient Phoenician, maqom ħadaš means "new place".

== Population ==
Historical population

Year	Pop.	±%
1981	527	—
1991	663	+25.8%
2001	596	−10.1%

Year	Pop.	±%
2011	643	+7.9%
2021	604	−6.1%
2025	597	−1.2%
