= Solarussa =

Solarussa Sabarussa
- Comune
- Comune di Solarussa
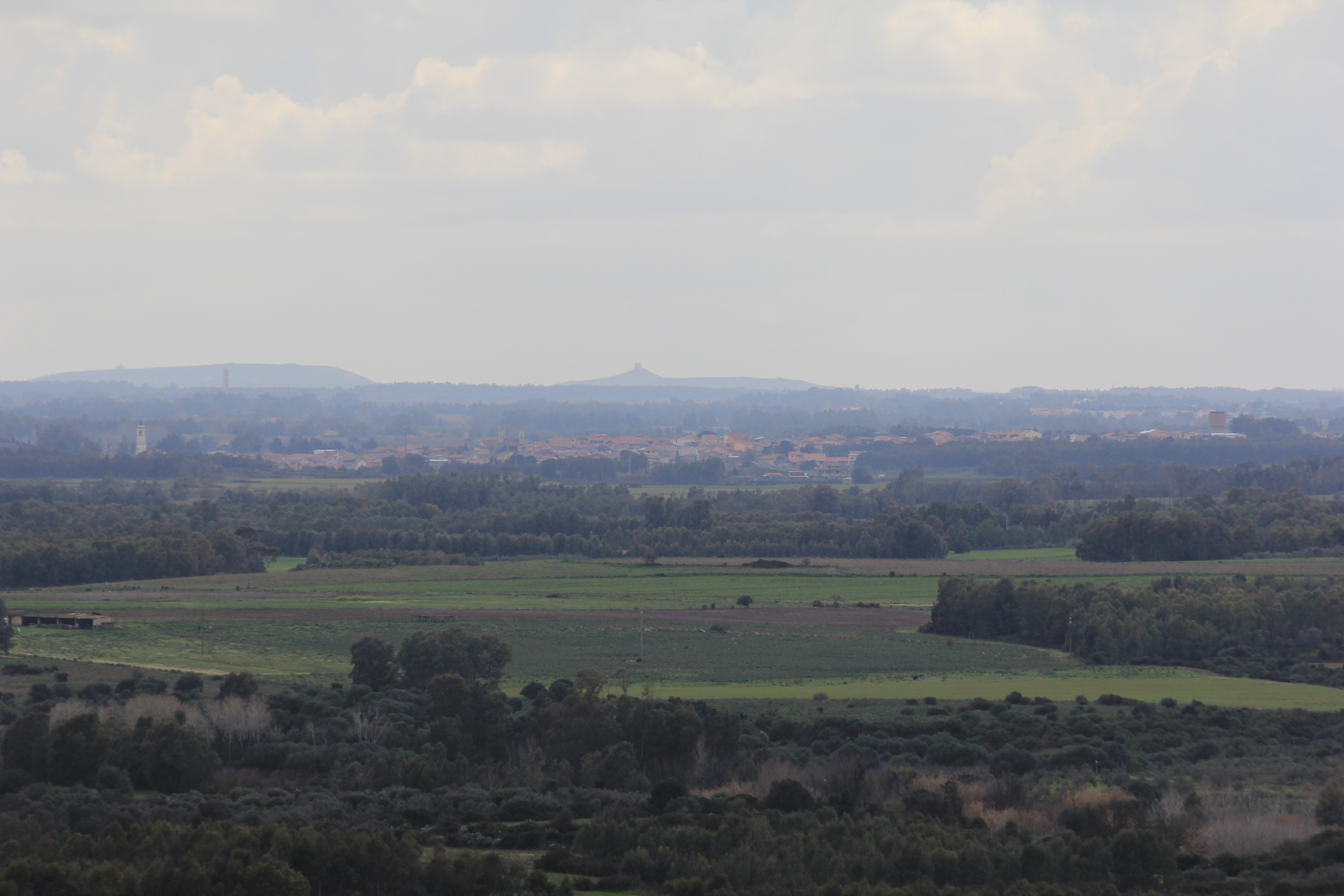

- Location within Sardinia
- Coordinates: 39°57′N 8°41′E
- Country: Italy
- Region: Sardinia
- Province: Province of Oristano (OR)

Area
  - Total: 31.9 km^{2} (12.3 sq mi)
- Elevation: 163 m (535 ft)

Population (Dec. 2004)
  - Total: 2,496
  - Density: 78.2/km^{2} (203/sq mi)
- Demonym: Solarussesi
- Time zone: UTC+1 (CET)
  - Summer (DST): UTC+2 (CEST)
- Postal code: 09077
- Dialing code: 0783
- Website: Official website

Solarussa is a comune (municipality) in the Province of Oristano in the Italian region Sardinia, located about 115 kilometres (71 mi) northwest of Cagliari and about 14 kilometres (9 mi) northeast of Oristano. As of 31 December 2004, it had a population of 2,496 and an area of 31.9 square kilometres (12.3 mi^{2}).

Solarussa borders the following municipalities: Bauladu, Oristano, Paulilatino, Siamaggiore, Simaxis, Tramatza, Zerfaliu.

== Demographic evolution ==
Historical population

| Year | Pop. | ±% |
|---|---|---|
| 1861 | 1,974 | — |
| 1871 | 1,812 | −8.2% |
| 1881 | 1,935 | +6.8% |
| 1901 | 1,658 | −14.3% |
| 1911 | 1,771 | +6.8% |

| Year | Pop. | ±% |
|---|---|---|
| 1921 | 1,772 | +0.1% |
| 1931 | 1,823 | +2.9% |
| 1936 | 1,947 | +6.8% |
| 1951 | 2,274 | +16.8% |
| 1961 | 2,594 | +14.1% |

| Year | Pop. | ±% |
|---|---|---|
| 1971 | 2,453 | −5.4% |
| 1981 | 2,592 | +5.7% |
| 1991 | 2,629 | +1.4% |
| 2001 | 2,493 | −5.2% |

Source: Data from ISTAT
