= Tramatza =

- Comune
- Comune di Tramatza
- Location within Sardinia
- Coordinates: 40°0′N 8°39′E
- Country: Italy
- Region: Sardinia
- Province: Province of Oristano (OR)

Area
  - Total: 16.8 km^{2} (6.5 sq mi)
- Elevation: 19 m (62 ft)

Population (Dec. 2004)
  - Total: 1,007
  - Density: 59.9/km^{2} (155/sq mi)
- Time zone: UTC+1 (CET)
  - Summer (DST): UTC+2 (CEST)
- Postal code: 09070
- Dialing code: 0783

Tramatza is a comune (municipality) in the Province of Oristano in the Italian region Sardinia, located about 100 kilometres (62 mi) northwest of Cagliari and about 12 kilometres (7 mi) northeast of Oristano. As of 31 December 2004, it had a population of 1,007 and an area of 16.8 square kilometres (6.5 mi^{2}).

Tramatza borders the following municipalities: Bauladu, Milis, San Vero Milis, Siamaggiore, Solarussa, Zeddiani.

== Demographic evolution ==
Historical population

Year	Pop.	±%
1861	888	—
1871	895	+0.8%
1881	895	+0.0%
1901	751	−16.1%
1911	843	+12.3%

Year	Pop.	±%
1921	809	−4.0%
1931	797	−1.5%
1936	884	+10.9%
1951	1,010	+14.3%
1961	1,002	−0.8%

Year	Pop.	±%
1971	907	−9.5%
1981	974	+7.4%
1991	1,005	+3.2%
2001	998	−0.7%

Source: Data from ISTAT
