= Tinnura =

- Comune
- Comune di Tinnura
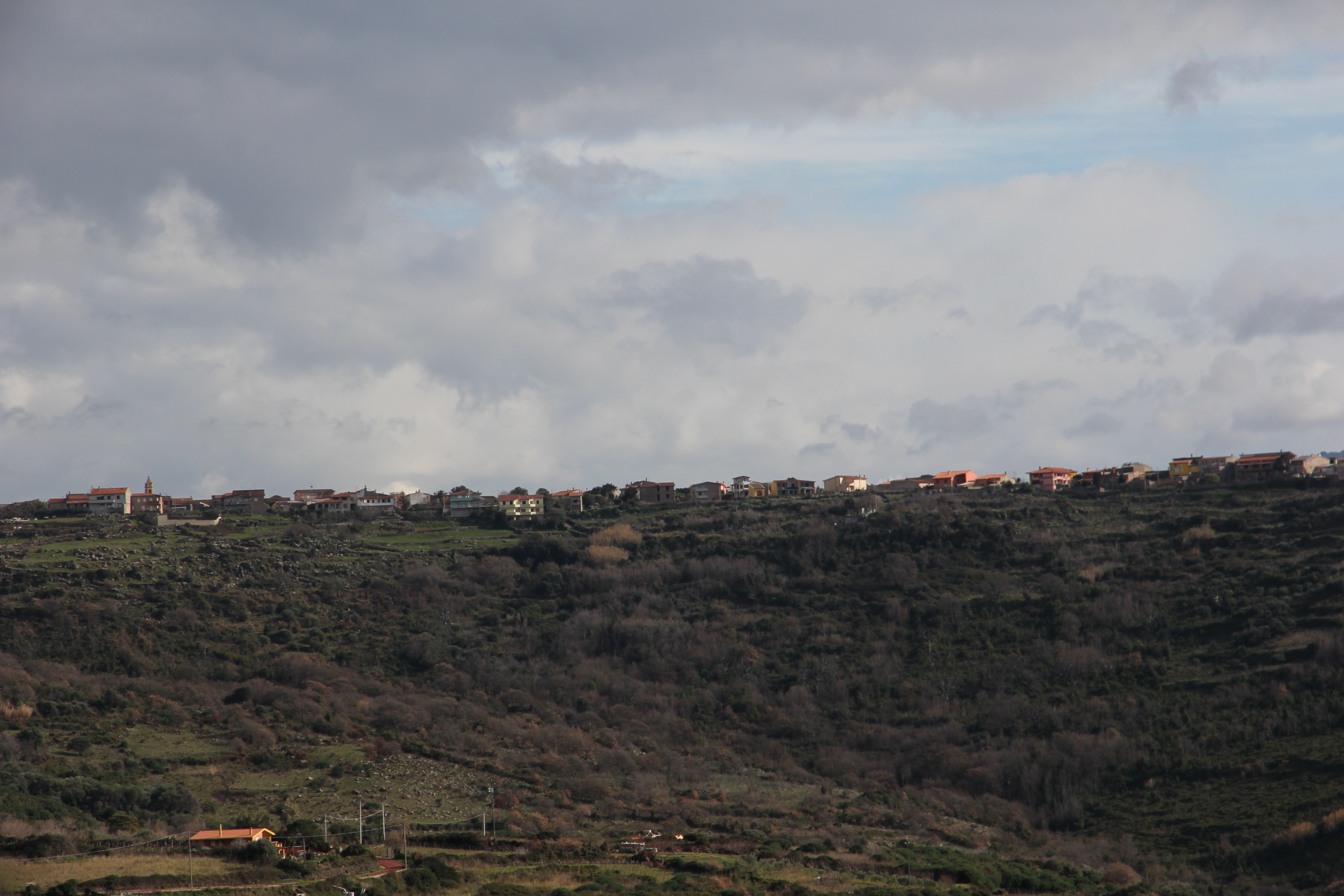

- Location within Sardinia
- Coordinates: 40°16′N 8°33′E
- Country: Italy
- Region: Sardinia
- Province: Province of Oristano (OR)

Area
  - Total: 3.8 km^{2} (1.5 sq mi)
- Elevation: 328 m (1,076 ft)

Population (Dec. 2004)
  - Total: 268
  - Density: 71/km^{2} (180/sq mi)
- Time zone: UTC+1 (CET)
  - Summer (DST): UTC+2 (CEST)
- Postal code: 08010
- Dialing code: 0785
- Website: Official website

Tinnura is a comune (municipality) in the Province of Oristano in the Italian region Sardinia, located about 130 kilometres (81 mi) northwest of Cagliari and about 40 kilometres (25 mi) north of Oristano. As of 31 December 2004, it had a population of 268 and an area of 3.8 square kilometres (1.5 mi^{2}).

Tinnura borders the following municipalities: Flussio, Sagama, Suni.

== Demographic evolution ==
Historical population

Year	Pop.	±%
1861	191	—
1871	224	+17.3%
1881	252	+12.5%
1901	273	+8.3%
1911	291	+6.6%

Year	Pop.	±%
1921	319	+9.6%
1931	329	+3.1%
1936	322	−2.1%
1951	354	+9.9%
1961	373	+5.4%

Year	Pop.	±%
1971	314	−15.8%
1981	273	−13.1%
1991	253	−7.3%
2001	272	+7.5%

Source: Data from ISTAT
