= Flussio =

Flussio Frussìo
- Comune
- Comune di Flussio
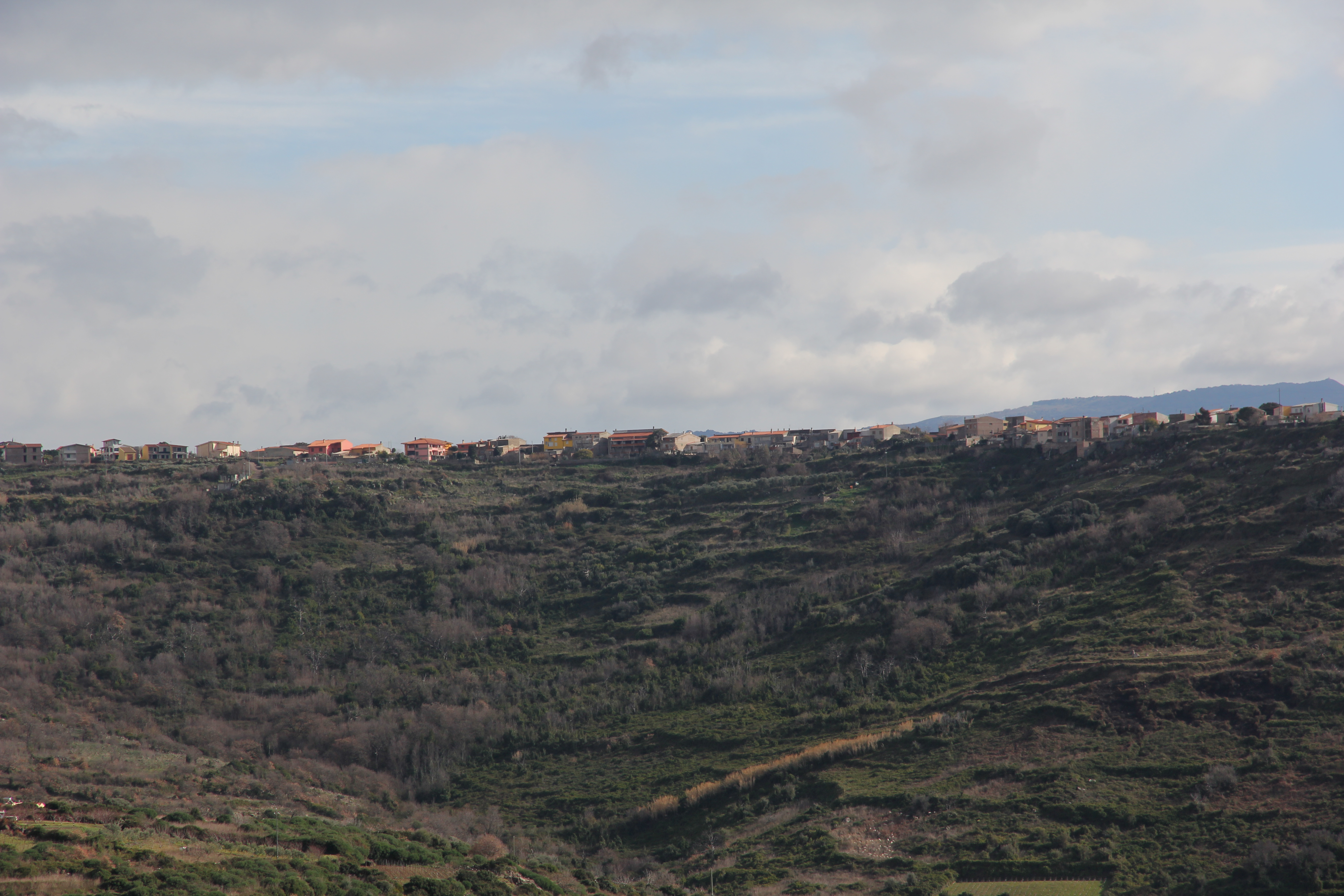

- Location within Sardinia
- Coordinates: 40°16′N 8°32′E
- Country: Italy
- Region: Sardinia
- Province: Province of Oristano (OR)

Area
  - Total: 6.9 km^{2} (2.7 sq mi)
- Elevation: 305 m (1,001 ft)

Population (Dec. 2004)
  - Total: 492
  - Density: 71/km^{2} (180/sq mi)
- Demonym(s): Frussiesos; Flussiesi
- Time zone: UTC+1 (CET)
  - Summer (DST): UTC+2 (CEST)
- Postal code: 08010
- Dialing code: 0785
- Website: Official website

Flussio (Sardinian: Frussìo) is a comune (municipality) in the Province of Oristano in the Italian region Sardinia, located about 130 kilometres (81 mi) northwest of Cagliari and about 40 kilometres (25 mi) north of Oristano. As of 31 December 2004, it had a population of 492 and an area of 6.9 square kilometres (2.7 mi^{2}).

Flussio borders the following municipalities: Magomadas, Modolo, Sagama, Scano di Montiferro, Sennariolo, Suni, Tinnura, Tresnuraghes.

== Demographic evolution ==
Historical population

Year	Pop.	±%
1861	545	—
1871	615	+12.8%
1881	695	+13.0%
1901	754	+8.5%
1911	823	+9.2%

Year	Pop.	±%
1921	772	−6.2%
1931	764	−1.0%
1936	742	−2.9%
1951	742	+0.0%
1961	695	−6.3%

Year	Pop.	±%
1971	555	−20.1%
1981	573	+3.2%
1991	533	−7.0%
2001	497	−6.8%

Source: Data from ISTAT
