= Bauladu =

Bauladu Baulàu (Sardinian)
- Comune
- Comune di Bauladu
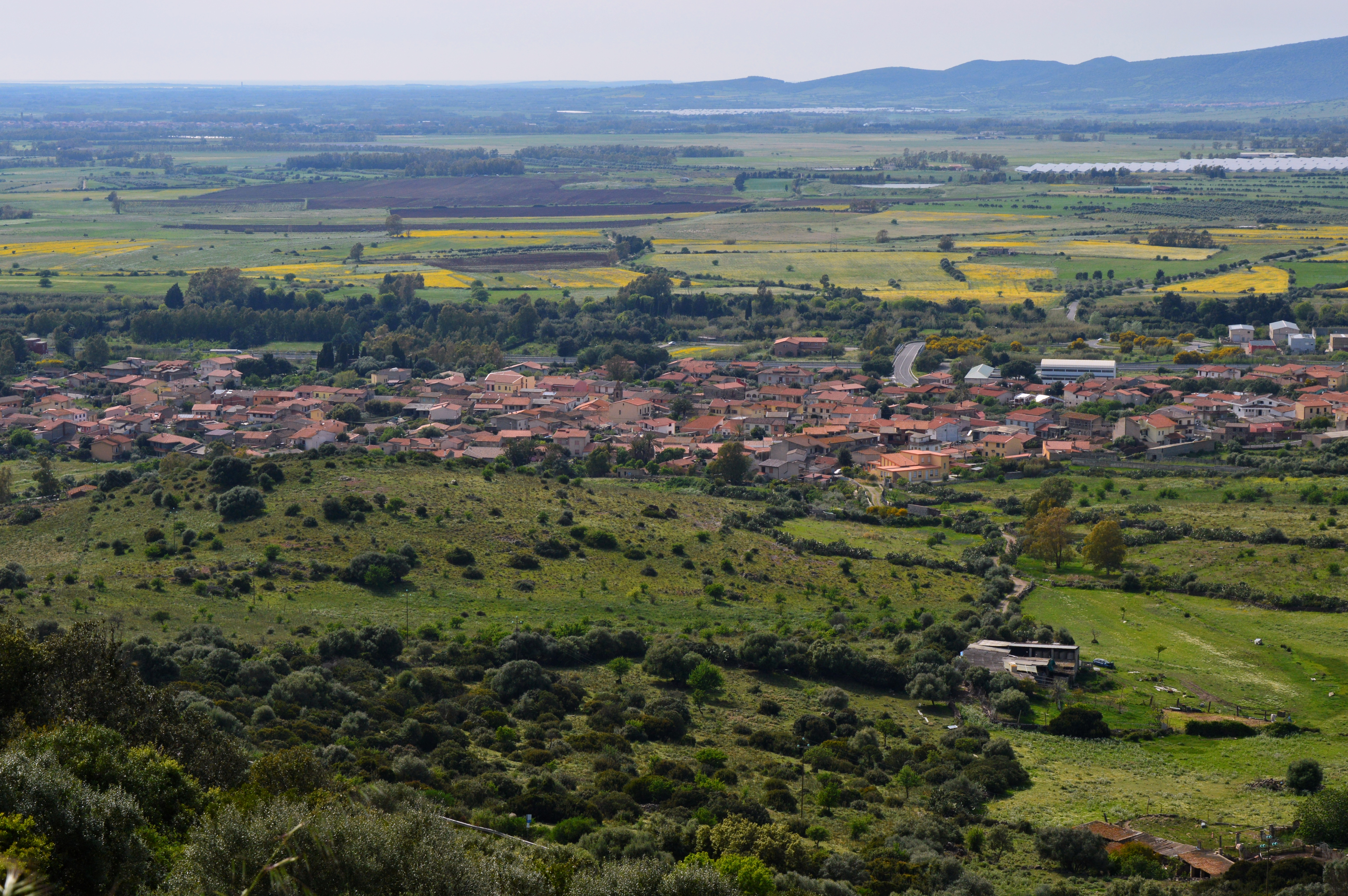
- View of Bauladu

- Location within Sardinia
- Coordinates: 40°1′N 8°40′E
- Country: Italy
- Region: Sardinia
- Province: Oristano

Government
  - Mayor: Davide Corriga

Area
  - Total: 24.22 km^{2} (9.35 sq mi)
- Elevation: 38 m (125 ft)

Population (2026)
  - Total: 613
  - Density: 25.3/km^{2} (65.6/sq mi)
- Demonyms: Bauladesi; Baulaesus
- Time zone: UTC+1 (CET)
  - Summer (DST): UTC+2 (CEST)
- Postal code: 09070
- Dialing code: 0783

Bauladu (Sardinian: Baulàu, meaning "wide ford"), is a village and comune (municipality) in the Province of Oristano in the autonomous island region of Sardinia in Italy, located about 100 kilometres (62 mi) northwest of Cagliari and about 15 kilometres (9 mi) northeast of Oristano. It has 613 inhabitants.

Bauladu borders the municipalities of Bonarcado, Milis, Paulilatino, Solarussa, and Tramatza.

== Demographics ==
As of 2026, the population is 613, of which 49.8% are male, and 50.2% are female. Minors make up 9.5% of the population, and seniors make up 27.7%.

Historical population

Year	Pop.	±%
1861	626	—
1871	733	+17.1%
1881	847	+15.6%
1901	721	−14.9%
1911	803	+11.4%
1921	761	−5.2%
1931	793	+4.2%
1936	844	+6.4%

Year	Pop.	±%
1951	874	+3.6%
1961	801	−8.4%
1971	582	−27.3%
1981	646	+11.0%
1991	685	+6.0%
2001	687	+0.3%
2011	703	+2.3%
2021	647	−8.0%

Source: ISTAT

=== Immigration ===
As of 2025, of the known countries of birth of 612 residents, the most numerous are: Italy (594 – 97.1%), Morocco (5 – 0.8%).
