= Zeddiani =

- Comune
- Comune di Zeddiani
- Location within Sardinia
- Coordinates: 39°59′N 8°36′E
- Country: Italy
- Region: Sardinia
- Province: Province of Oristano (OR)

Area
  - Total: 11.9 km^{2} (4.6 sq mi)

Population (Dec. 2004)
  - Total: 1,154
  - Density: 97.0/km^{2} (251/sq mi)
- Time zone: UTC+1 (CET)
  - Summer (DST): UTC+2 (CEST)
- Postal code: 09070
- Dialing code: 0783

Zeddiani is a comune (municipality) in the Province of Oristano in the Italian region Sardinia, located about 100 kilometres (62 mi) northwest of Cagliari and about 9 kilometres (6 mi) north of Oristano. As of 31 December 2004, it had a population of 1,154 and an area of 11.9 square kilometres (4.6 mi^{2}).

Zeddiani borders the following municipalities: Baratili San Pietro, Oristano, San Vero Milis, Siamaggiore and Tramatza.

The town holds an annual tomato festival, "La Sagra del Pomodoro", usually on the first Sunday of August.

== Demographic evolution ==
Historical population

Year	Pop.	±%
1861	710	—
1871	675	−4.9%
1881	714	+5.8%
1901	720	+0.8%
1911	788	+9.4%

Year	Pop.	±%
1921	766	−2.8%
1931	817	+6.7%
1936	878	+7.5%
1951	1,022	+16.4%
1961	1,117	+9.3%

Year	Pop.	±%
1971	1,026	−8.1%
1981	1,068	+4.1%
1991	1,126	+5.4%
2001	1,190	+5.7%

Source: Data from ISTAT
