= Siamaggiore =

Siamaggiore Siamaiore/Siamajori
- Comune
- Comune di Siamaggiore
- Coat of arms

- Location within Sardinia
- Coordinates: 39°57′N 8°38′E
- Country: Italy
- Region: Sardinia
- Province: Oristano (OR)
- Frazioni: Pardu Nou

Government
  - Mayor: Giuseppino Piras

Area
  - Total: 13.2 km^{2} (5.1 sq mi)

Population (Dec. 2004)
  - Total: 1,005
  - Density: 76.1/km^{2} (197/sq mi)
- Demonym: Siamaggioreresi
- Time zone: UTC+1 (CET)
  - Summer (DST): UTC+2 (CEST)
- Postal code: 09070
- Dialing code: 0783
- Patron saint: St. Constantine Emperor
- Saint day: 23 aprile

Siamaggiore (Sardinian: Siamaiore or Siamajori) is a comune (municipality) in the Province of Oristano in the Italian region Sardinia, located about 90 kilometres (56 mi) northwest of Cagliari and about 7 kilometres (4 mi) northeast of Oristano.

Siamaggiore borders the following municipalities: Oristano, Solarussa, Tramatza, Zeddiani.
