= Suni, Sardinia =

Suni
- Comune
- Comune di Suni
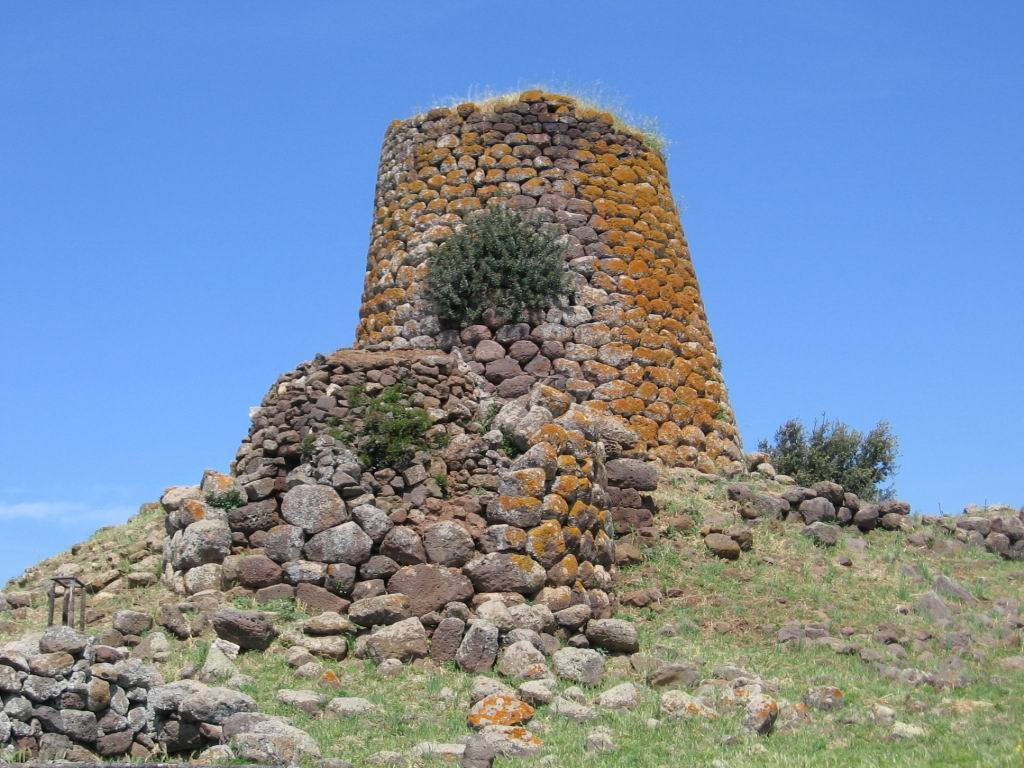
- Nuraghi tower

- Location within Sardinia
- Coordinates: 40°17′N 8°33′E
- Country: Italy
- Region: Sardinia
- Province: Province of Oristano (OR)

Area
  - Total: 47.4 km^{2} (18.3 sq mi)

Population (Dec. 2010)
  - Total: 1,131
  - Density: 23.9/km^{2} (61.8/sq mi)
- Time zone: UTC+1 (CET)
  - Summer (DST): UTC+2 (CEST)
- Postal code: 08010
- Dialing code: 0785

Suni is a comune (municipality) in the Province of Oristano in the Italian region Sardinia, located about 130 kilometres (81 mi) northwest of Cagliari and about 45 kilometres (28 mi) north of Oristano. As of 31 December 2010, it had a population of 1,131 and an area of 47.4 square kilometres (18.3 mi^{2}).

Suni borders the following municipalities: Bosa, Flussio, Modolo, Pozzomaggiore, Sagama, Sindia, Tinnura.

== Demographic evolution ==
Historical population

Year	Pop.	±%
1861	1,016	—
1871	1,157	+13.9%
1881	1,301	+12.4%
1901	1,612	+23.9%
1911	1,667	+3.4%

Year	Pop.	±%
1921	1,708	+2.5%
1931	1,883	+10.2%
1936	1,927	+2.3%
1951	1,824	−5.3%
1961	1,700	−6.8%

Year	Pop.	±%
1971	1,480	−12.9%
1981	1,382	−6.6%
1991	1,299	−6.0%
2001	1,237	−4.8%

Source: Data from ISTAT
