= Baratili San Pietro =

Baratili San Pietro Boàtiri
- Comune
- Comune di Baratili San Pietro
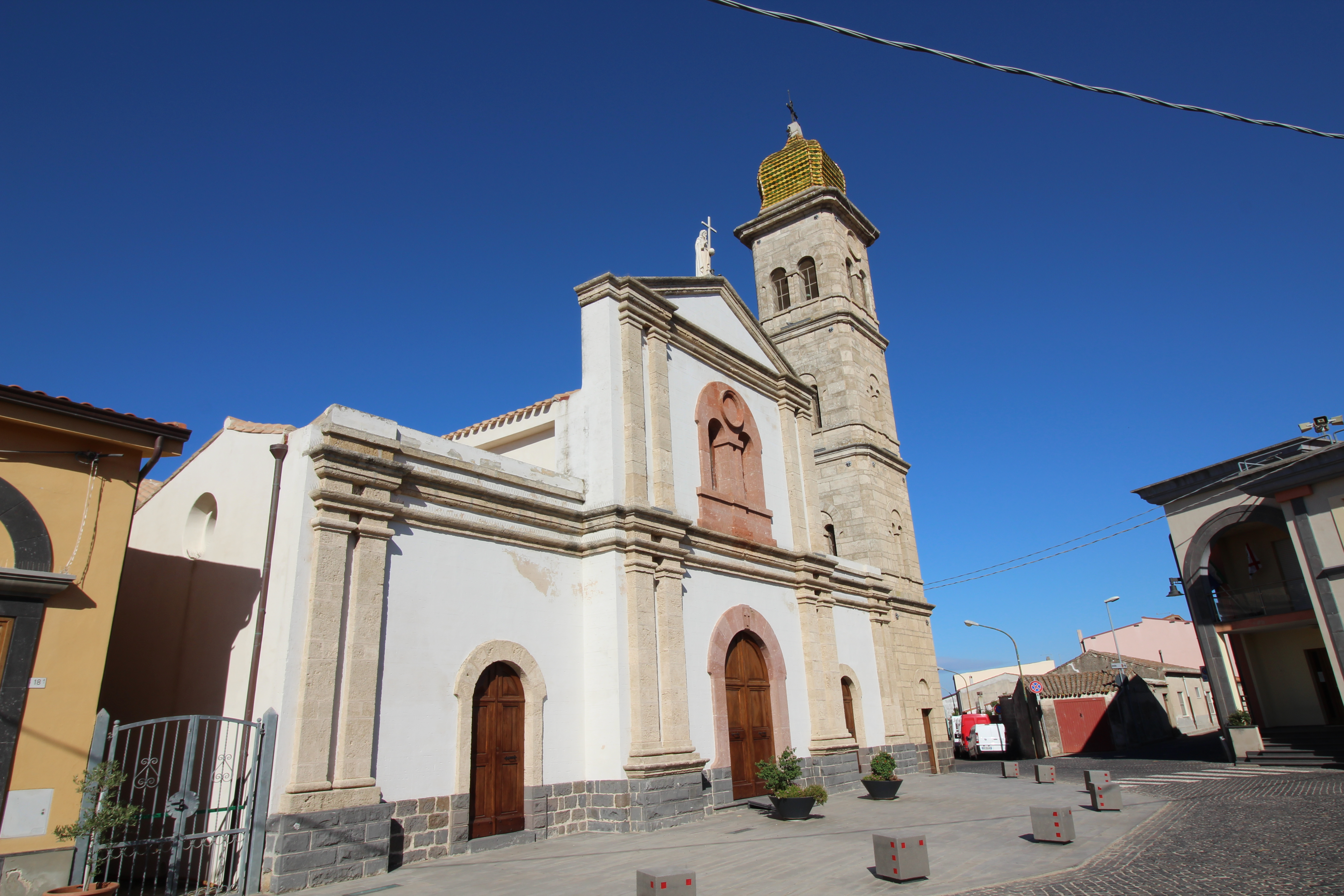
- Church of San Pietro (Saint Peter)

- Location within Sardinia
- Coordinates: 40°0′N 8°34′E
- Country: Italy
- Region: Sardinia
- Province: Province of Oristano

Government
  - Mayor: Alberto Pippia

Area
  - Total: 6.10 km^{2} (2.36 sq mi)

Population (2026)
  - Total: 1,194
  - Density: 196/km^{2} (507/sq mi)
- Demonyms: Baratilesi; Boatiresus
- Time zone: UTC+1 (CET)
  - Summer (DST): UTC+2 (CEST)
- Postal code: 09070
- Dialing code: 0783

Baratili San Pietro (Sardinian: Boàtiri) is a town and comune (municipality) in the Province of Oristano in the autonomous island region of Sardinia in Italy, located about 100 kilometres (62 miles) northwest of Cagliari and about 11 km (7 mi) north of Oristano. It has 1,194 inhabitants.

Baratili San Pietro borders the municipalities of Nurachi, Oristano, Riola Sardo, San Vero Milis, Zeddiani.

== Demographics ==
As of 2026, the population is 1,194, of which 49.2% are male, and 50.8% are female. Minors make up 10.5% of the population, and seniors make up 31.2%.

Historical population

Year	Pop.	±%
1861	654	—
1871	638	−2.4%
1881	687	+7.7%
1901	794	+15.6%
1911	842	+6.0%
1921	866	+2.9%
1931	904	+4.4%
1936	1,019	+12.7%

Year	Pop.	±%
1951	1,156	+13.4%
1961	1,221	+5.6%
1971	1,204	−1.4%
1981	1,186	−1.5%
1991	1,203	+1.4%
2001	1,251	+4.0%
2011	1,329	+6.2%
2021	1,211	−8.9%

Source: ISTAT

=== Immigration ===
As of 2025, of the known countries of birth of 1,188 residents, the most numerous are: Italy (1,144 – 96.3%), Germany (16 – 1.3%), Romania (9 – 0.8%).
