= Sagama =

Sagama Sàgama
- Comune
- Comune di Sagama
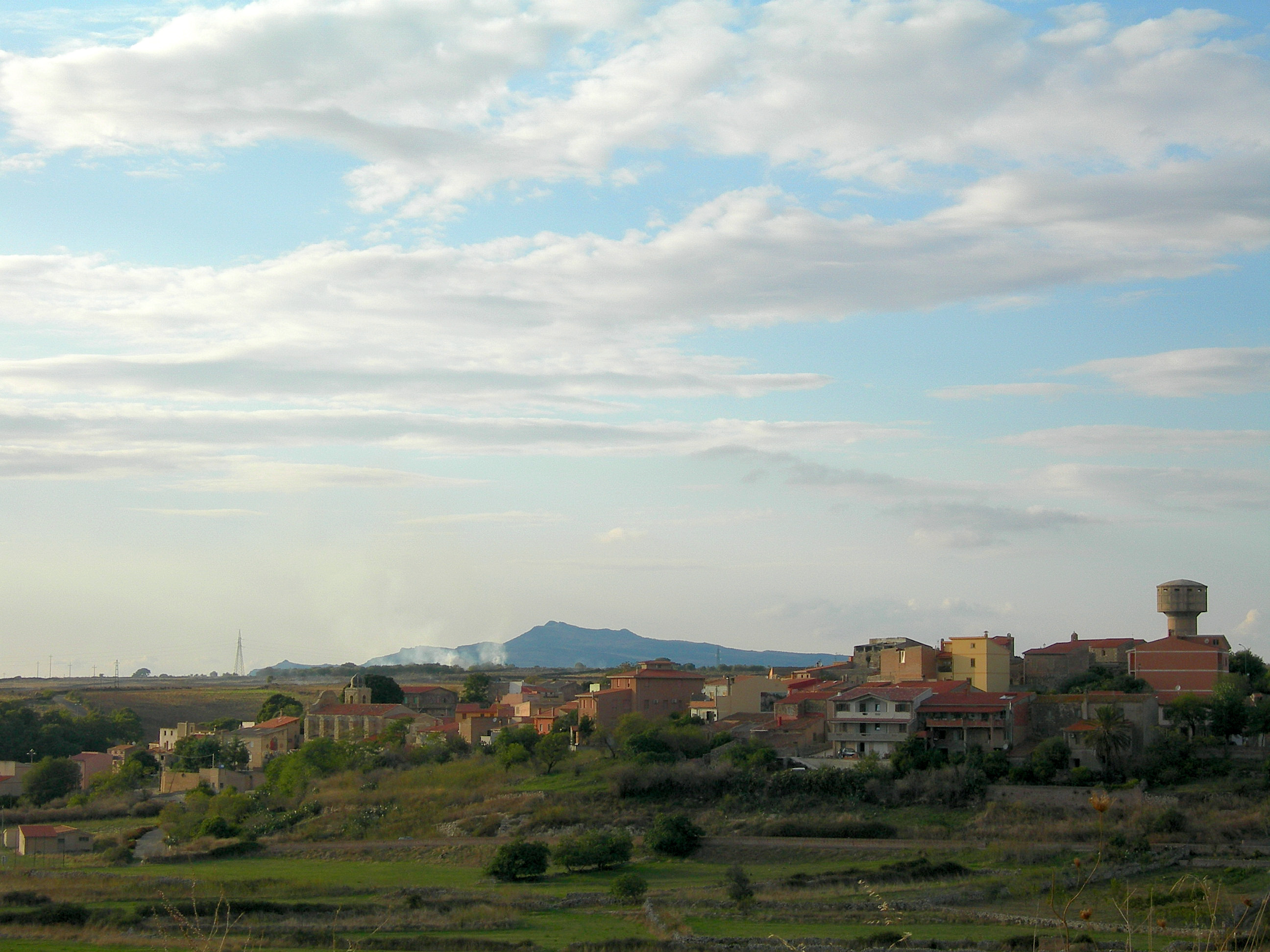

- Location within Sardinia
- Coordinates: 40°15′40″N 8°34′45″E
- Country: Italy
- Region: Sardinia
- Province: Province of Oristano (OR)

Area
  - Total: 11.6 km^{2} (4.5 sq mi)
- Elevation: 347 m (1,138 ft)

Population (Dec. 2004)
  - Total: 201
  - Density: 17.3/km^{2} (44.9/sq mi)
- Demonym: Sagamesi
- Time zone: UTC+1 (CET)
  - Summer (DST): UTC+2 (CEST)
- Postal code: 08010
- Dialing code: 0785
- Website: Official website

Sagama (Sardinian: Sàgama) is a comune (municipality) in the Province of Oristano in the Italian region Sardinia, located about 130 kilometres (81 mi) northwest of Cagliari and about 40 kilometres (25 mi) north of Oristano. As of 31 December 2004, it had a population of 201 and an area of 11.6 square kilometres (4.5 mi^{2}).

Sagama borders the following municipalities: Flussio, Scano di Montiferro, Sindia, Suni, Tinnura.

== Demographic evolution ==
Historical population

Year	Pop.	±%
1861	447	—
1871	492	+10.1%
1881	473	−3.9%
1901	463	−2.1%
1911	523	+13.0%

Year	Pop.	±%
1921	540	+3.3%
1931	532	−1.5%
1936	529	−0.6%
1951	476	−10.0%
1961	455	−4.4%

Year	Pop.	±%
1971	324	−28.8%
1981	294	−9.3%
1991	254	−13.6%
2001	213	−16.1%

Source: Data from ISTAT
