= Sindia, Sardinia =

Sindia Sindìa (Sardinian)
- Comune
- Comune di Sindia
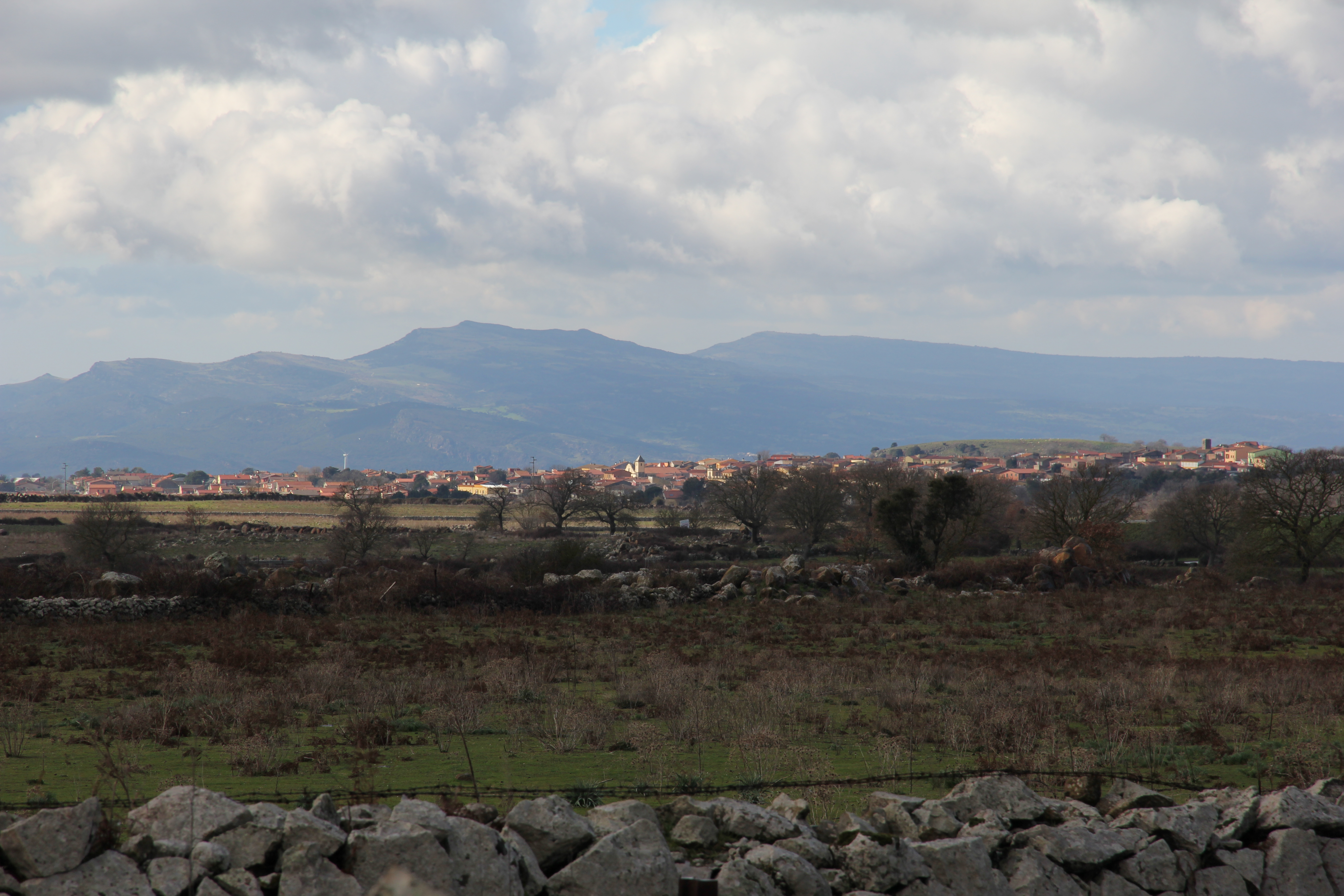
- View of Sindia

- Location within Sardinia
- Coordinates: 40°18′N 8°39′E
- Country: Italy
- Region: Sardinia
- Province: Nuoro (NU)

Area
  - Total: 58.57 km^{2} (22.61 sq mi)

Population (2026)
  - Total: 1,558
  - Density: 26.60/km^{2} (68.90/sq mi)
- Time zone: UTC+1 (CET)
  - Summer (DST): UTC+2 (CEST)
- Postal code: 08018
- Dialing code: 0785

Sindia (Sardinian: Sindìa) is a town and comune (municipality) in the Province of Nuoro in the autonomous island region of Sardinia in Italy, located about 130 kilometres (81 mi) northwest of Cagliari and about 60 kilometres (37 mi) west of Nuoro. It has 1,558 inhabitants.

Sindia borders the municipalities of Macomer, Pozzomaggiore, Sagama, Scano di Montiferro, Semestene, and Suni.

== Demographics ==
As of 2026, the population is 1,558, of which 48.0% are male, and 52.0% are female. Minors make up 12.8% of the population, and seniors make up 33.1%.

Historical population

Year	Pop.	±%
1861	1,491	—
1871	1,502	+0.7%
1881	1,764	+17.4%
1901	2,134	+21.0%
1911	2,315	+8.5%
1921	2,498	+7.9%
1931	2,509	+0.4%
1936	2,591	+3.3%

Year	Pop.	±%
1951	2,705	+4.4%
1961	2,877	+6.4%
1971	2,334	−18.9%
1981	2,362	+1.2%
1991	2,233	−5.5%
2001	1,971	−11.7%
2011	1,811	−8.1%
2021	1,609	−11.2%

Source: ISTAT

=== Immigration ===
As of 2025, immigrants make up 6.6% of the population. The 5 largest foreign countries of birth are Belgium, Germany, Romania, Switzerland, and Canada.
