= Modolo =

Modolo Mòdolo
- Comune
- Comune di Modolo
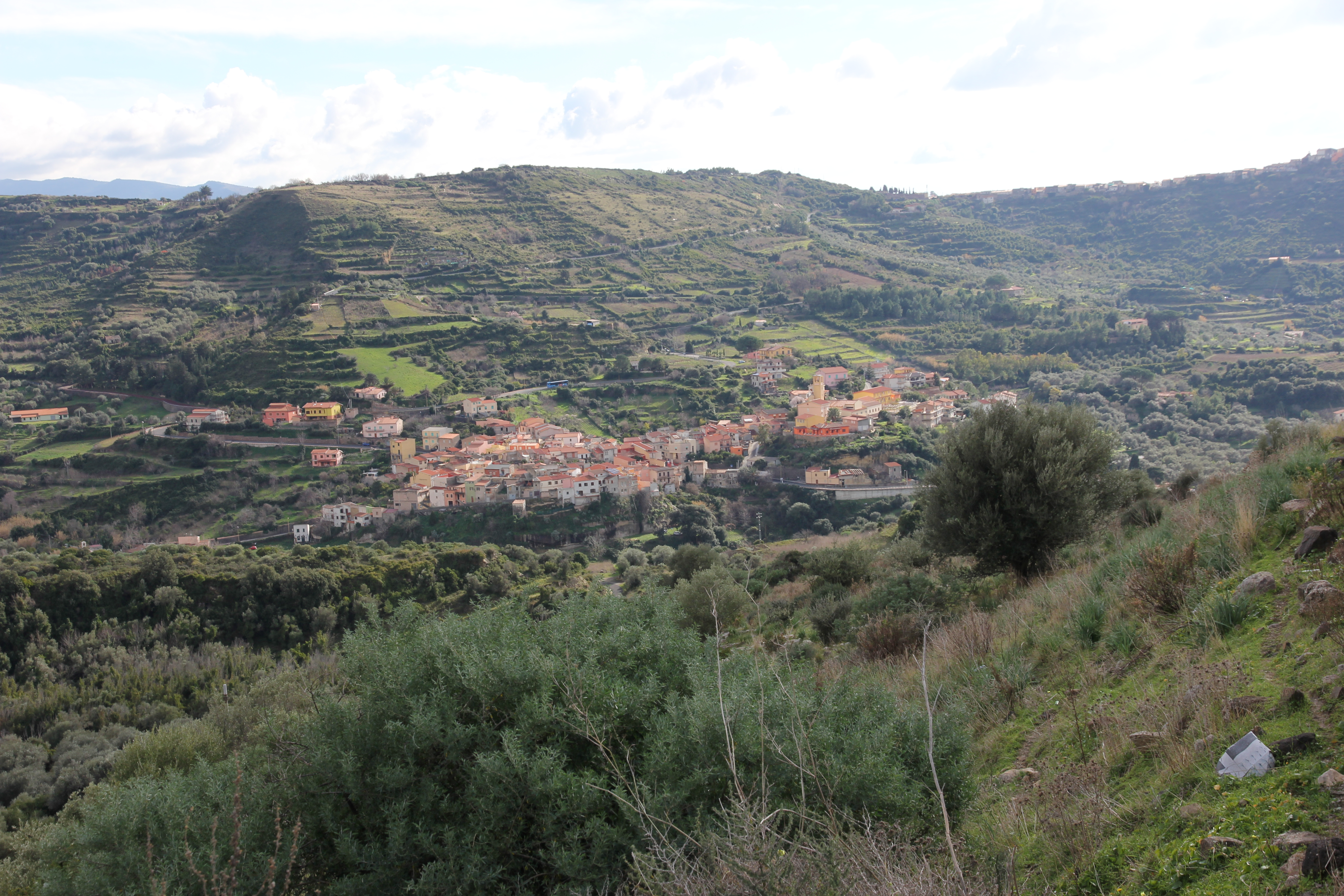

- Location within Sardinia
- Coordinates: 40°16′N 8°32′E
- Country: Italy
- Region: Sardinia
- Province: Province of Oristano (OR)

Area
  - Total: 2.5 km^{2} (0.97 sq mi)

Population (Dec. 2004)
  - Total: 196
  - Density: 78/km^{2} (200/sq mi)
- Time zone: UTC+1 (CET)
  - Summer (DST): UTC+2 (CEST)
- Postal code: 08019
- Dialing code: 0785

Modolo (Sardinian: Mòdolo) is a comune (municipality) in the Province of Oristano in the Italian region Sardinia, located about 130 kilometres (81 mi) northwest of Cagliari and about 40 kilometres (25 mi) north of Oristano. As of 31 December 2004, it had a population of 196 and an area of 2.5 square kilometres (0.97 mi^{2}).

Modolo borders the following municipalities: Bosa, Flussio, Magomadas, Suni.

== Demographic evolution ==
Historical population

Year	Pop.	±%
1861	371	—
1871	400	+7.8%
1881	431	+7.7%
1901	450	+4.4%
1911	502	+11.6%

Year	Pop.	±%
1921	431	−14.1%
1931	421	−2.3%
1936	405	−3.8%
1951	374	−7.7%
1961	369	−1.3%

Year	Pop.	±%
1971	285	−22.8%
1981	231	−18.9%
1991	222	−3.9%
2001	181	−18.5%

Source: Data from ISTAT
