= Santu Lussurgiu =

Santu Lussurgiu Santu Lussurzu (Sardinian)
- Comune
- Comune di Santu Lussurgiu
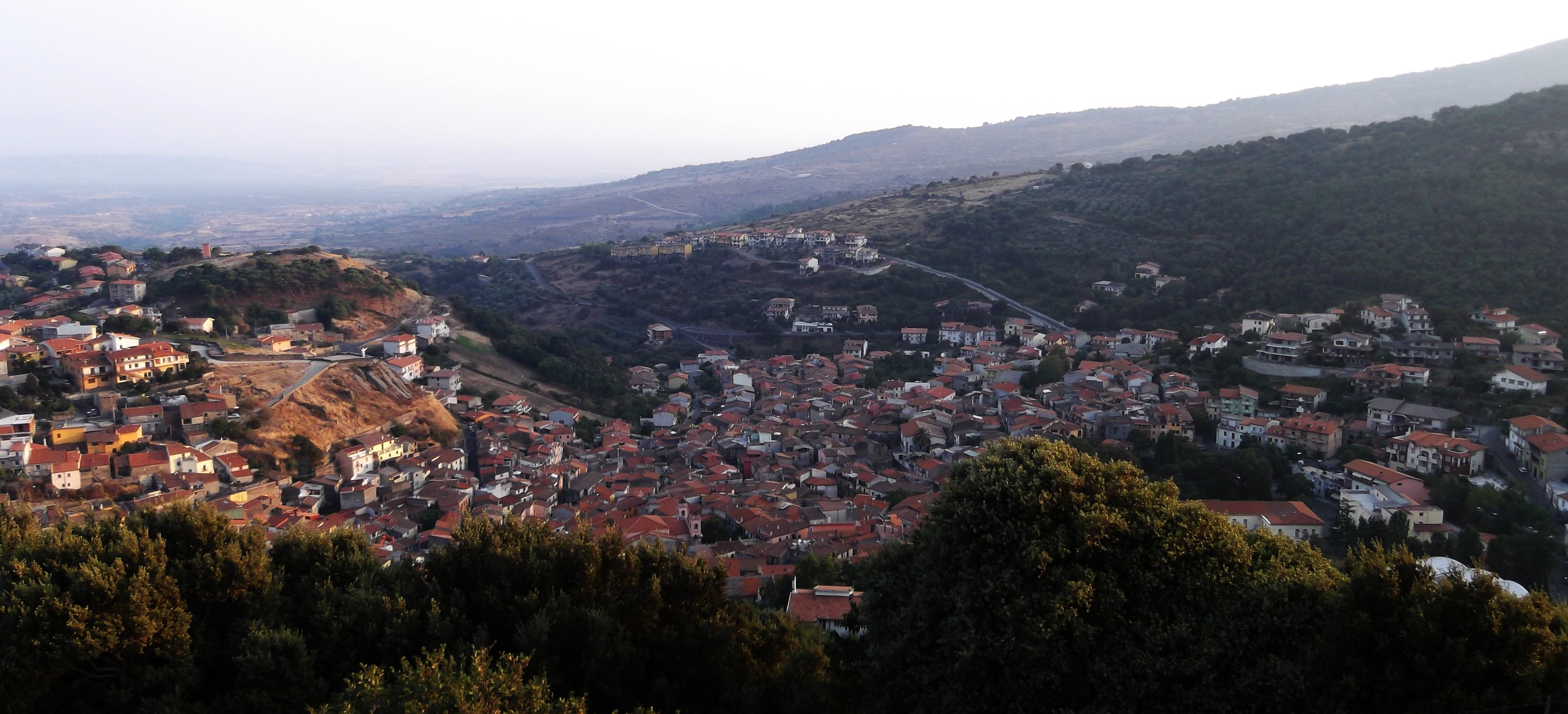

- Coat of arms

- Location within Sardinia
- Coordinates: 40°8′N 8°39′E
- Country: Italy
- Region: Sardinia
- Province: Oristano (OR)
- Frazioni: San Leonardo di Siete Fuentes

Government
  - Mayor: Emilio Chessa

Area
  - Total: 99.8 km^{2} (38.5 sq mi)
- Elevation: 503 m (1,650 ft)

Population (31 December 2010)
  - Total: 2,471
  - Density: 24.8/km^{2} (64.1/sq mi)
- Demonym: Lussurgesi
- Time zone: UTC+1 (CET)
  - Summer (DST): UTC+2 (CEST)
- Postal code: 09075
- Dialing code: 0783
- Website: Official website

Santu Lussurgiu (Italian: [ˈsantu lusˈsurdʒu]; Sardinian: Santu Lussurzu [ˈsantu luˈsuɾdzu]) is a commune in the Province of Oristano, in the region of Sardinia, Italy, located about 110 kilometres (68 mi) northwest of Cagliari and about 25 kilometres (16 mi) north of Oristano.

Santu Lussurgiu borders the following municipalities: Abbasanta, Bonarcado, Borore, Cuglieri, Norbello, Paulilatino, Scano di Montiferro, Seneghe.

== Main sights ==
Santu Lussurgiu is surrounded by oaks and chestnut forest at 503 metres (1,650 ft) above sea level, at the edge of a massive extinct volcanic mountain, the Montiferru.

A rural museum features old tools for cheese production, the manufacture of iron, and related to farm work. San Pietro church, the local parish, is situated in the homonymous square, and the church of Santa Maria degli Angeli is situated near Market square.

Sant'Antonio al monte (Saint Anthony of the mountain), a mountain of 808 metres (2,651 ft) above sea level, is covered with various trees, including several ancient oaks. A church was built in 1944 in honor of St. Anthony, with two statues: a Madonna, and the other of St. Anthony. There is an outdoor altar, and a path, the Way of the Cross, with statues representing the Passion of Christ.

San Leonardo de Siete Fuentes, located at 684 metres (2,244 ft) above sea level, is a small nearby settlement on the road going north from Santu Lussurgiu to Macomer that is inhabited almost exclusively during the summer, mainly by people taking refuge at the cooler, higher altitude. It is home to a 12th-century Romanesque church, dedicated to St. Leonard.

== Culture ==
The most known event of Santu Lussurgiu is “Sa Carrela e Nanti”, a horse race on a steep road with masked, paired riders, held annually at some point during the last three days of Carnival. “Cantigos in Carrela” is another event during Carnival, where folk groups from all over Sardinia parade through the streets of the village.
