= Seneghe =

Seneghe Sèneghe
- Comune
- Comune di Seneghe
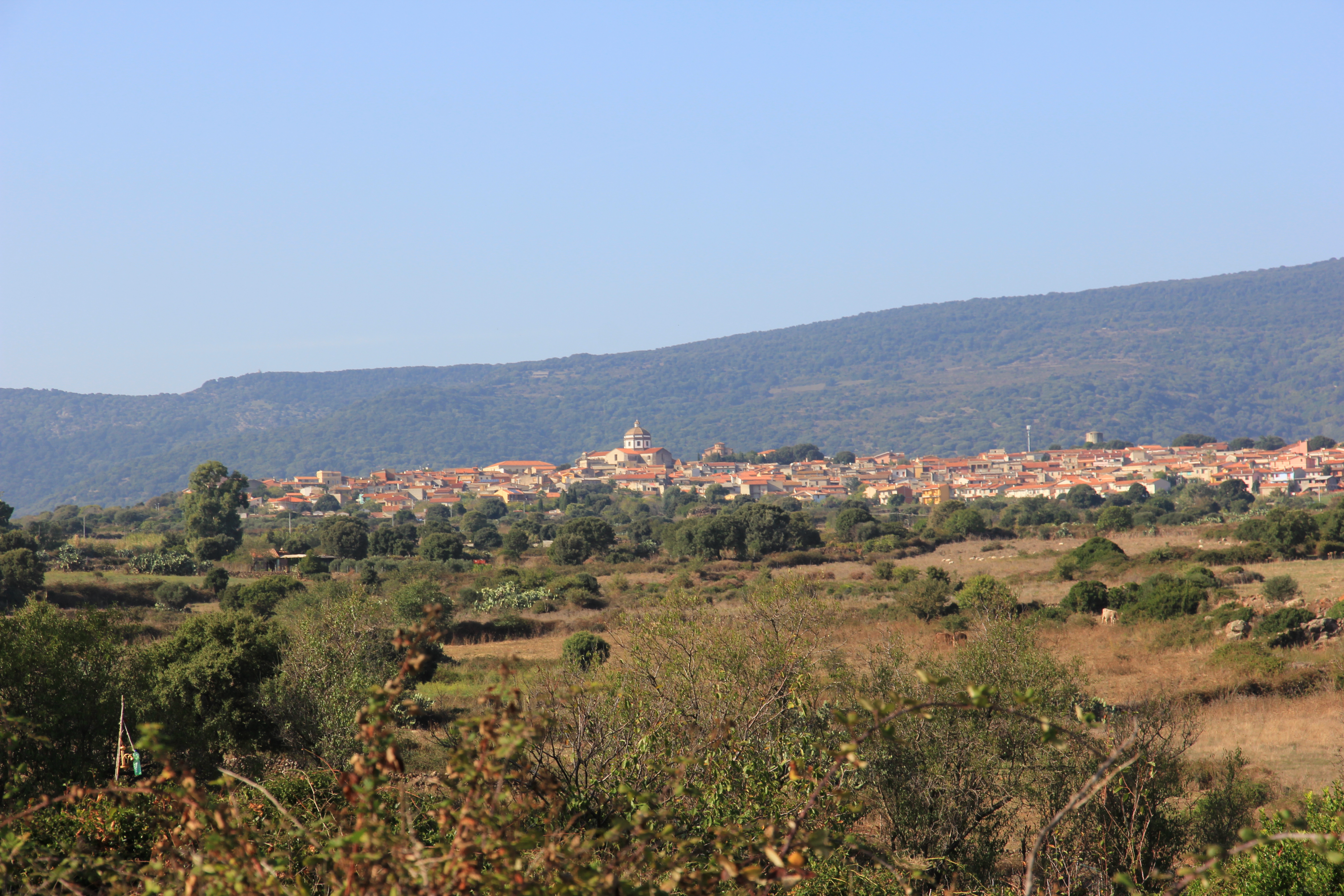

- Location within Sardinia
- Coordinates: 40°5′N 8°37′E
- Country: Italy
- Region: Sardinia
- Province: Province of Oristano (OR)

Area
  - Total: 57.8 km^{2} (22.3 sq mi)

Population (Dec. 2004)
  - Total: 1,944
  - Density: 33.6/km^{2} (87.1/sq mi)
- Time zone: UTC+1 (CET)
  - Summer (DST): UTC+2 (CEST)
- Postal code: 09070
- Dialing code: 0783

Seneghe (Sardinian: Sèneghe) is a comune (municipality) in the Province of Oristano in the Italian region Sardinia, located about 110 kilometres (68 mi) northwest of Cagliari and about 20 kilometres (12 mi) north of Oristano. As of 31 December 2004, it had a population of 1,944 and an area of 57.8 square kilometres (22.3 mi^{2}).

Seneghe borders the following municipalities: Bonarcado, Cuglieri, Milis, Narbolia, Santu Lussurgiu.

== Demographic evolution ==
Historical population

Year	Pop.	±%
1861	2,237	—
1871	2,203	−1.5%
1881	2,298	+4.3%
1901	2,305	+0.3%
1911	2,541	+10.2%

Year	Pop.	±%
1921	2,408	−5.2%
1931	2,376	−1.3%
1936	2,435	+2.5%
1951	2,621	+7.6%
1961	2,506	−4.4%

Year	Pop.	±%
1971	2,144	−14.4%
1981	2,103	−1.9%
1991	2,051	−2.5%
2001	1,972	−3.9%

Source: Data from ISTAT
