= Pozzomaggiore =

Pozzomaggiore Putumajore (Sardinian)
- Comune
- Comune di Pozzomaggiore
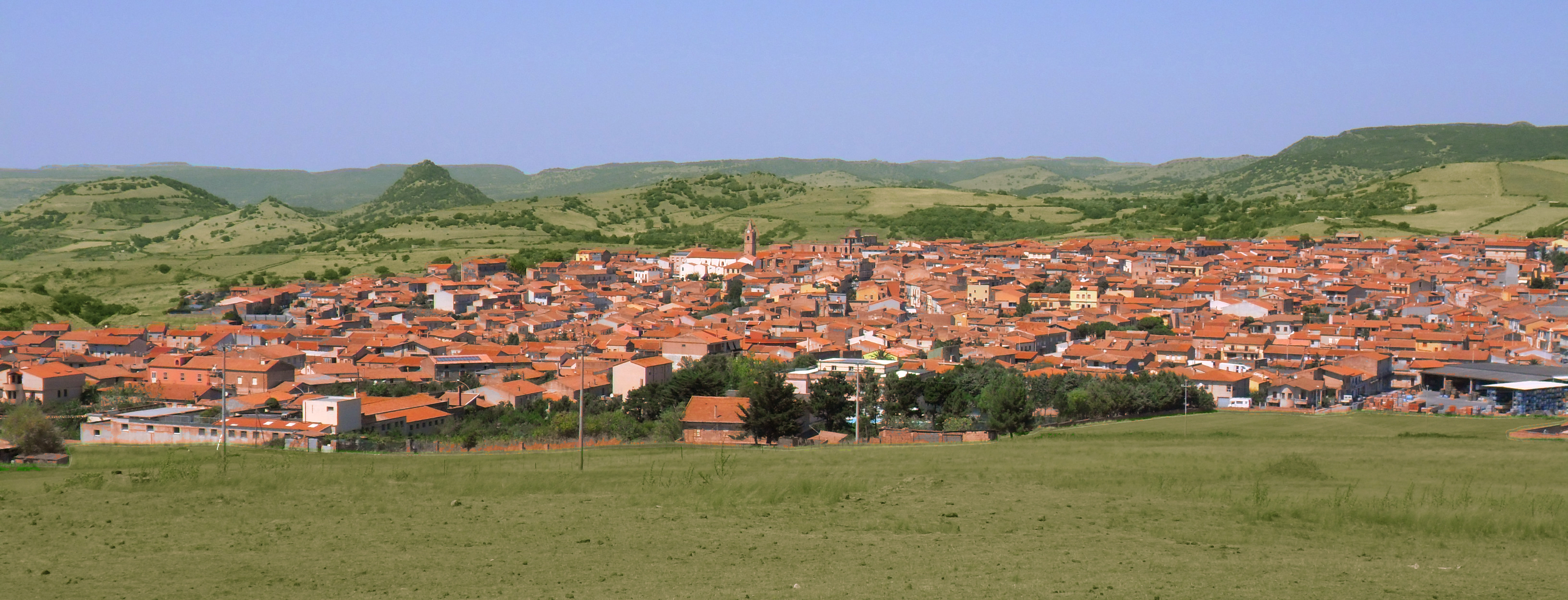
- View of Pozzomaggiore

- Location within Sardinia
- Coordinates: 40°24′N 8°40′E
- Country: Italy
- Region: Sardinia
- Metropolitan city: Sassari (SS)

Area
  - Total: 78.77 km^{2} (30.41 sq mi)

Population (2026)
  - Total: 2,286
  - Density: 29.02/km^{2} (75.16/sq mi)
- Demonym: Pozzomaggioresi
- Time zone: UTC+1 (CET)
  - Summer (DST): UTC+2 (CEST)
- Postal code: 07018
- Dialing code: 079
- Website: Official website

Pozzomaggiore (Sardinian: Putumajore) is a town and comune (municipality) in the Metropolitan City of Sassari in the autonomous island region of Sardinia in Italy, located about 140 kilometres (87 mi) northwest of Cagliari and about 40 kilometres (25 mi) south of Sassari. It has 2,286 inhabitants.

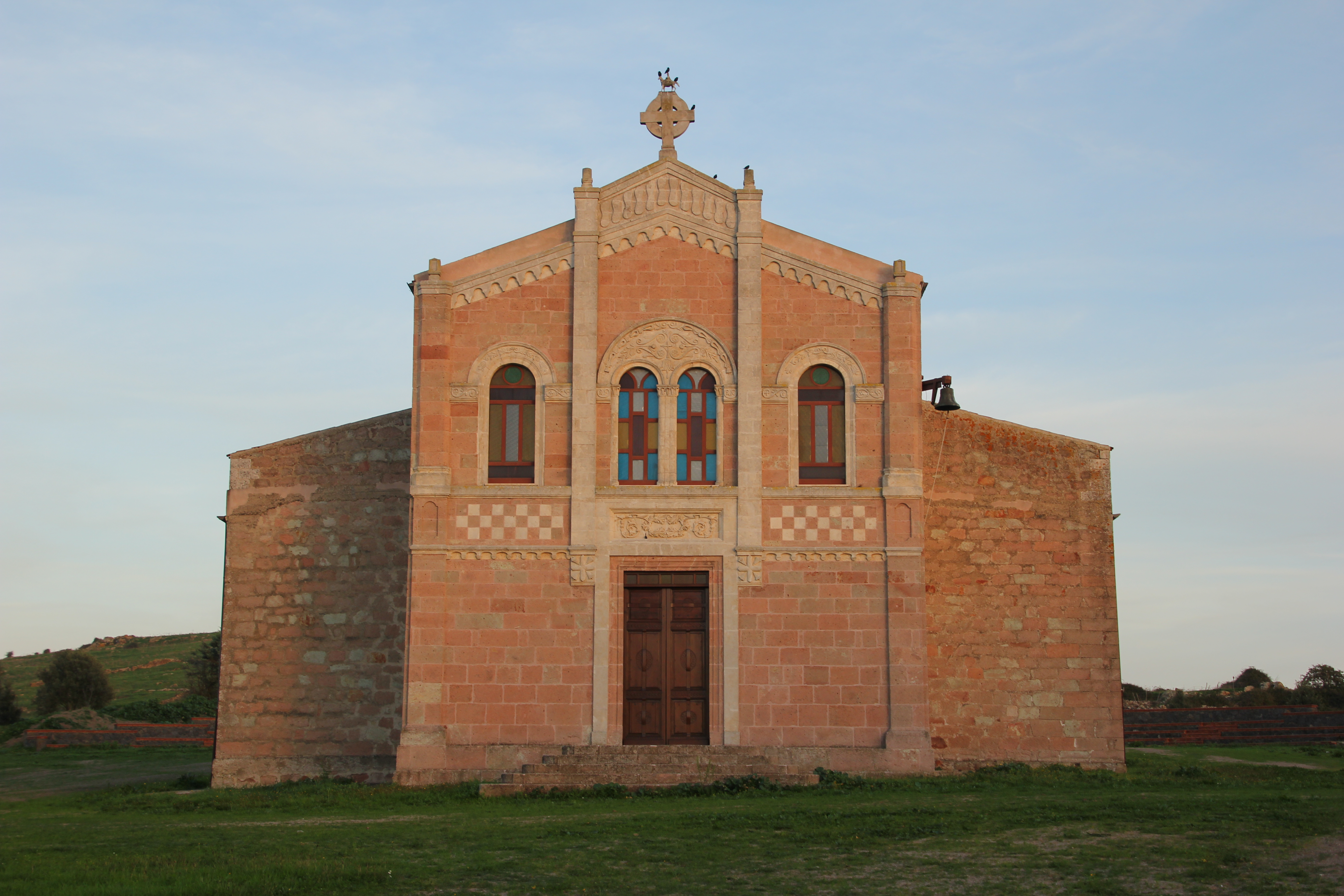
Church of San Costantino

Pozzomaggiore borders the municipalities of Bosa, Cossoine, Mara, Padria, Semestene, Sindia, and Suni.

== Demographics ==
As of 2026, the population is 2,286, of which 49.2% are males, and 50.8% are females. Minors make up 10.5% of the population, and seniors make up 31.8%.

Historical population

Year	Pop.	±%
1861	3,303	—
1871	3,489	+5.6%
1881	3,895	+11.6%
1901	4,337	+11.3%
1911	4,613	+6.4%
1921	4,512	−2.2%
1931	4,676	+3.6%
1936	4,586	−1.9%

Year	Pop.	±%
1951	4,956	+8.1%
1961	4,495	−9.3%
1971	3,747	−16.6%
1981	3,506	−6.4%
1991	3,266	−6.8%
2001	3,011	−7.8%
2011	2,717	−9.8%
2021	2,416	−11.1%

Source: ISTAT

=== Immigration ===
As of 2025, immigrants make up 4.2% of the population. The 5 largest foreign countries of birth are Morocco, Switzerland, Romania, Germany, and France.
