= Milis =

- Comune
- Comune di Milis
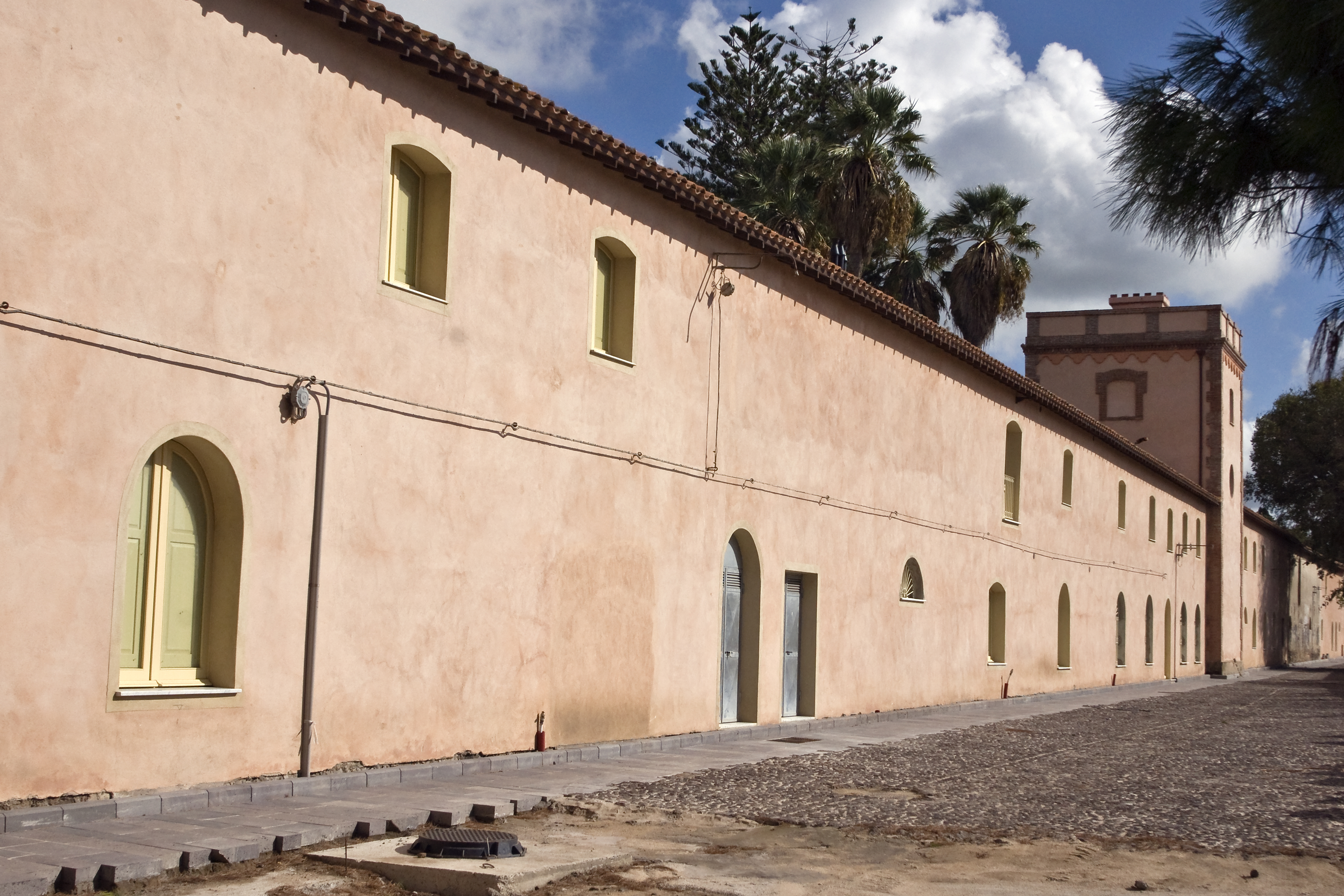
- Villa Pernis

- Location within Sardinia
- Coordinates: 40°3′N 8°38′E
- Country: Italy
- Region: Sardinia
- Province: Province of Oristano (OR)

Area
  - Total: 18.7 km^{2} (7.2 sq mi)

Population (Dec. 2004)
  - Total: 1,704
  - Density: 91.1/km^{2} (236/sq mi)
- Time zone: UTC+1 (CET)
  - Summer (DST): UTC+2 (CEST)
- Postal code: 09070
- Dialing code: 0783

Milis, Miris or Milis in Sardinian language, is a comune (municipality) in the Province of Oristano in the Italian region Sardinia, located about 100 kilometres (62 mi) northwest of Cagliari and about 15 kilometres (9 mi) north of Oristano. As of 31 December 2004, it had a population of 1,704 and an area of 18.7 square kilometres (7.2 mi^{2}).

Milis borders the following municipalities: Narbolia, Bauladu, Bonarcado, San Vero Milis, Seneghe, Tramatza.

== Demographic evolution ==
Historical population

Year	Pop.	±%
1861	1,779	—
1871	1,760	−1.1%
1881	1,799	+2.2%
1901	1,554	−13.6%
1911	1,544	−0.6%

Year	Pop.	±%
1921	1,427	−7.6%
1931	1,348	−5.5%
1936	1,369	+1.6%
1951	1,535	+12.1%
1961	1,646	+7.2%

Year	Pop.	±%
1971	1,552	−5.7%
1981	1,589	+2.4%
1991	1,694	+6.6%
2001	1,670	−1.4%

Source: Data from ISTAT
