= Scano di Montiferro =

Scano di Montiferro Iscanu
- Comune
- Comune di Scano di Montiferro
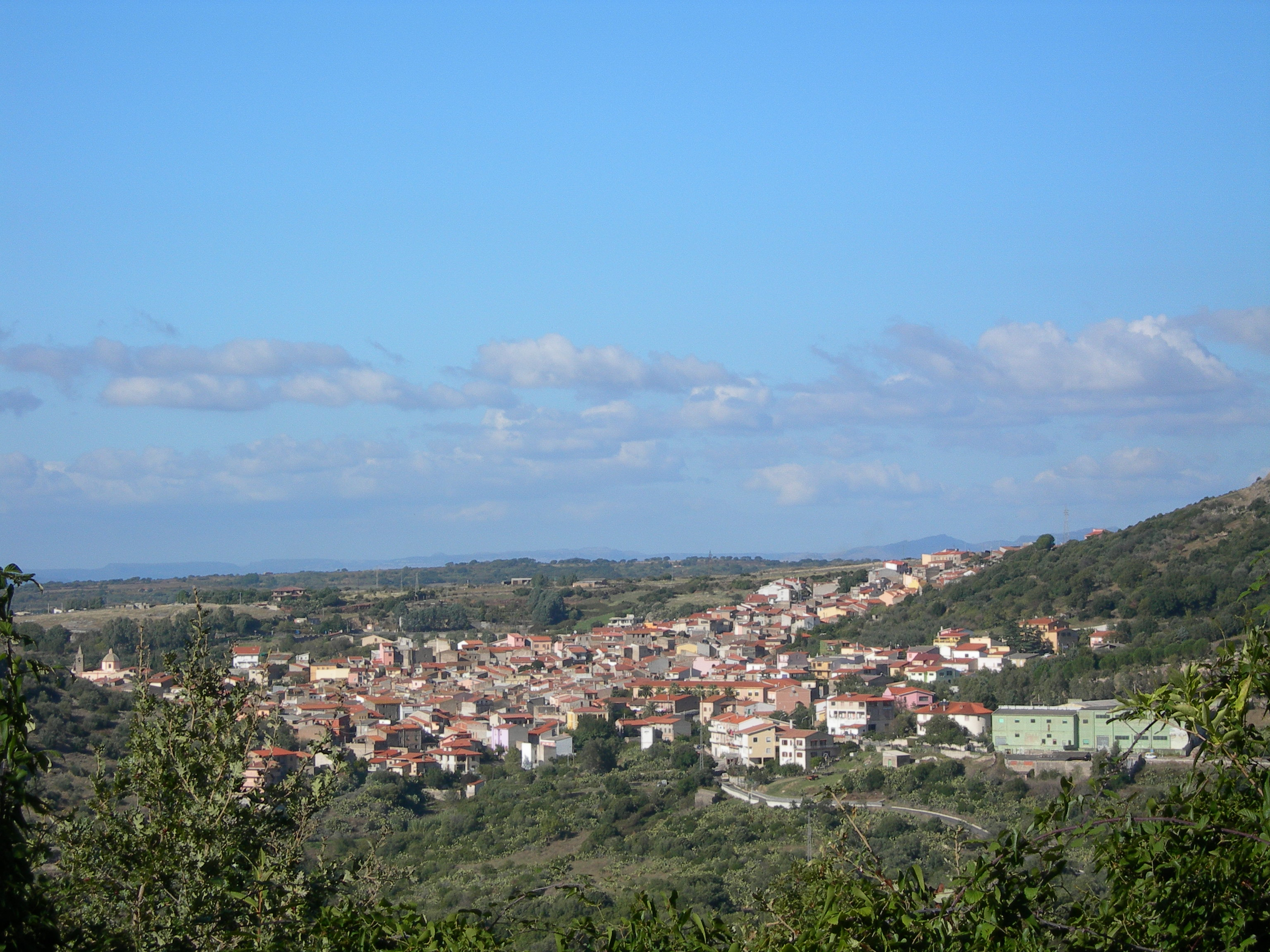

- Location within Sardinia
- Coordinates: 40°13′N 8°35′E
- Country: Italy
- Region: Sardinia
- Province: Oristano (OR)

Government
  - Mayor: Antonio Flore

Area
  - Total: 60.5 km^{2} (23.4 sq mi)
- Elevation: 385 m (1,263 ft)

Population (31 December 2010)
  - Total: 1,592
  - Density: 26.3/km^{2} (68.2/sq mi)
- Demonym: Scanesi
- Time zone: UTC+1 (CET)
  - Summer (DST): UTC+2 (CEST)
- Postal code: 09078
- Dialing code: 0785
- Website: Official website

Scano di Montiferro (Sardinian: Iscanu) is a comune (municipality) in the Province of Oristano in the Italian region Sardinia, located about 120 kilometres (75 mi) northwest of Cagliari and about 35 kilometres (22 mi) north of Oristano.

Scano di Montiferro borders the following municipalities: Borore, Cuglieri, Flussio, Macomer, Sagama, Santu Lussurgiu, Sennariolo, Sindia.

== History ==
The municipality of Scano was populated since prehistoric times as shown by the recoveries in its territory of Domus de Janas and Giant's graves the presence of numerous nuragic installations. In the Middle Ages the villa of Scano belonged to the curatoria of the Montiferro, in the giudicato of Torres; in 1259, with the death of the giudicessa Adelasia, the curatoria was attached to the giudicato of Arborea. In 1410 the villa passed to the Aragonese and in 1421 was included in the territories subjected to the Catalan Zatrillas family.

== Geography ==
The town rises to the slopes of the Montiferru, in one of the healthiest zones of the island up to 380 metres (1,250 ft) above sea level, from which it is a few kilometers away. Built on the crater of an ancient volcano on basaltic rocks, its territory is spread on hills and valleys among which flow courses of water.

The highest mountain is "Sa Pattada", elevation 980 metres (3,220 ft).

== Main sights ==
- Nuraghe Nuracale and some other 50 nuraghe
- Domus de janas
- giants' graves

== Gastronomy ==
The typical dish is the timballa de arrosu, a timbale of rice with filled of meats and vegetables.

The cultivation of the olive trees and the grapevine offer oil and wine. The bread and the sweets (amaretos, tiricas, pabassinos, bread of saba) is manufactured still with handicraft methods.

Among the cheeses is the casizzolu of the montiferru, from the characteristic shape of pear, derived of the bovine milk and the "pilotu", the authentic cheese of Sardinian sheep.
