= Tresnuraghes =

- Comune
- Comune di Tresnuraghes
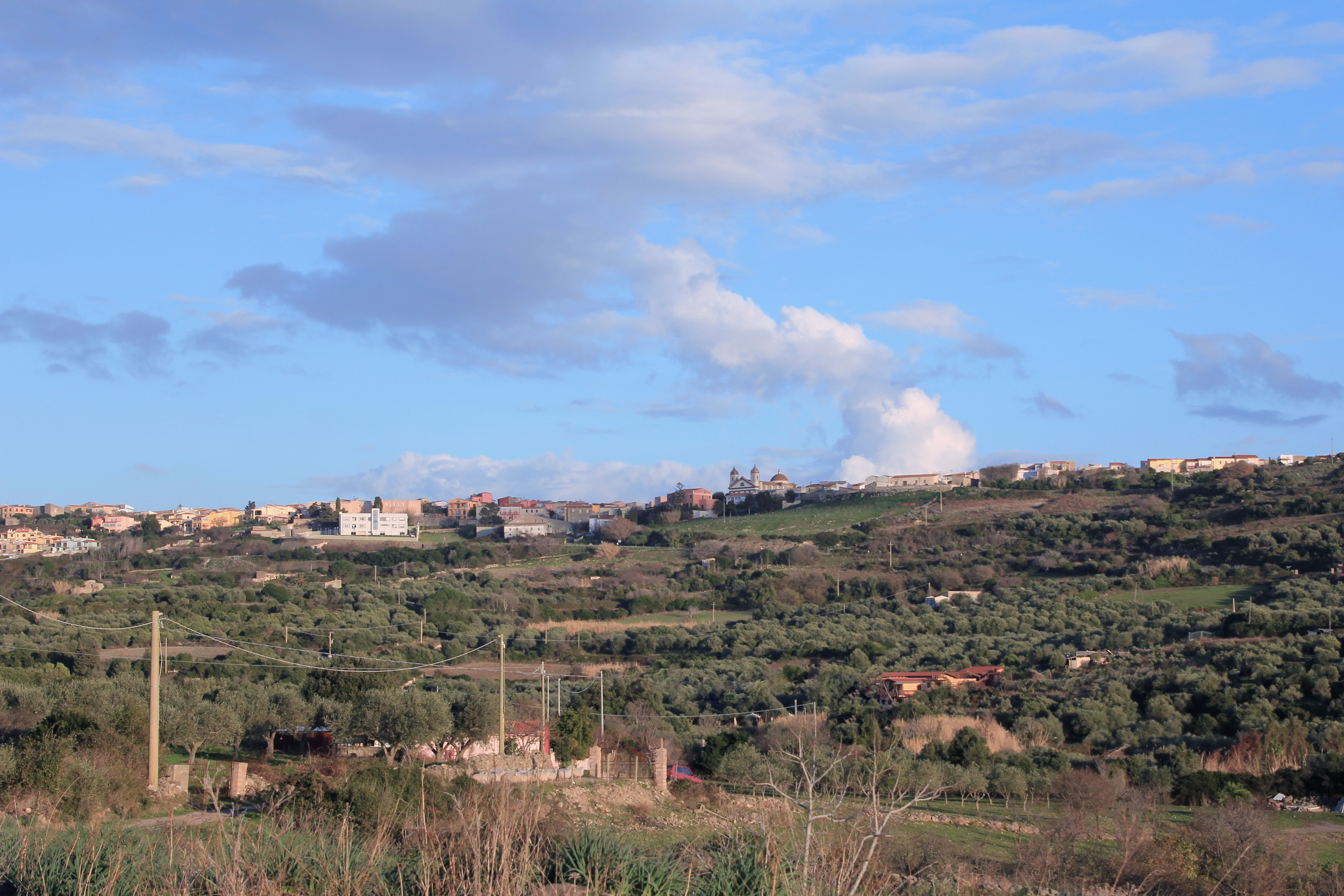
- San Giorgio

- Coat of arms

- Location within Sardinia
- Coordinates: 40°15′N 8°31′E
- Country: Italy
- Region: Sardinia
- Province: Oristano (OR)
- Frazioni: Porto Alabe

Area
  - Total: 31.55 km^{2} (12.18 sq mi)
- Elevation: 257 m (843 ft)

Population (Dec. 2004)
  - Total: 1,261
  - Density: 39.97/km^{2} (103.5/sq mi)
- Demonym: Tresnuraghesi
- Time zone: UTC+1 (CET)
  - Summer (DST): UTC+2 (CEST)
- Postal code: 09079
- Dialing code: 0785
- Patron saint: St. George
- Saint day: April 23
- Website: Official website

Tresnuraghes is a comune (municipality) in the Province of Oristano in the Italian region Sardinia, located about 130 kilometres (81 mi) northwest of Cagliari and about 40 kilometres (25 mi) north of Oristano. The name means three nuraghes in Sardinian.

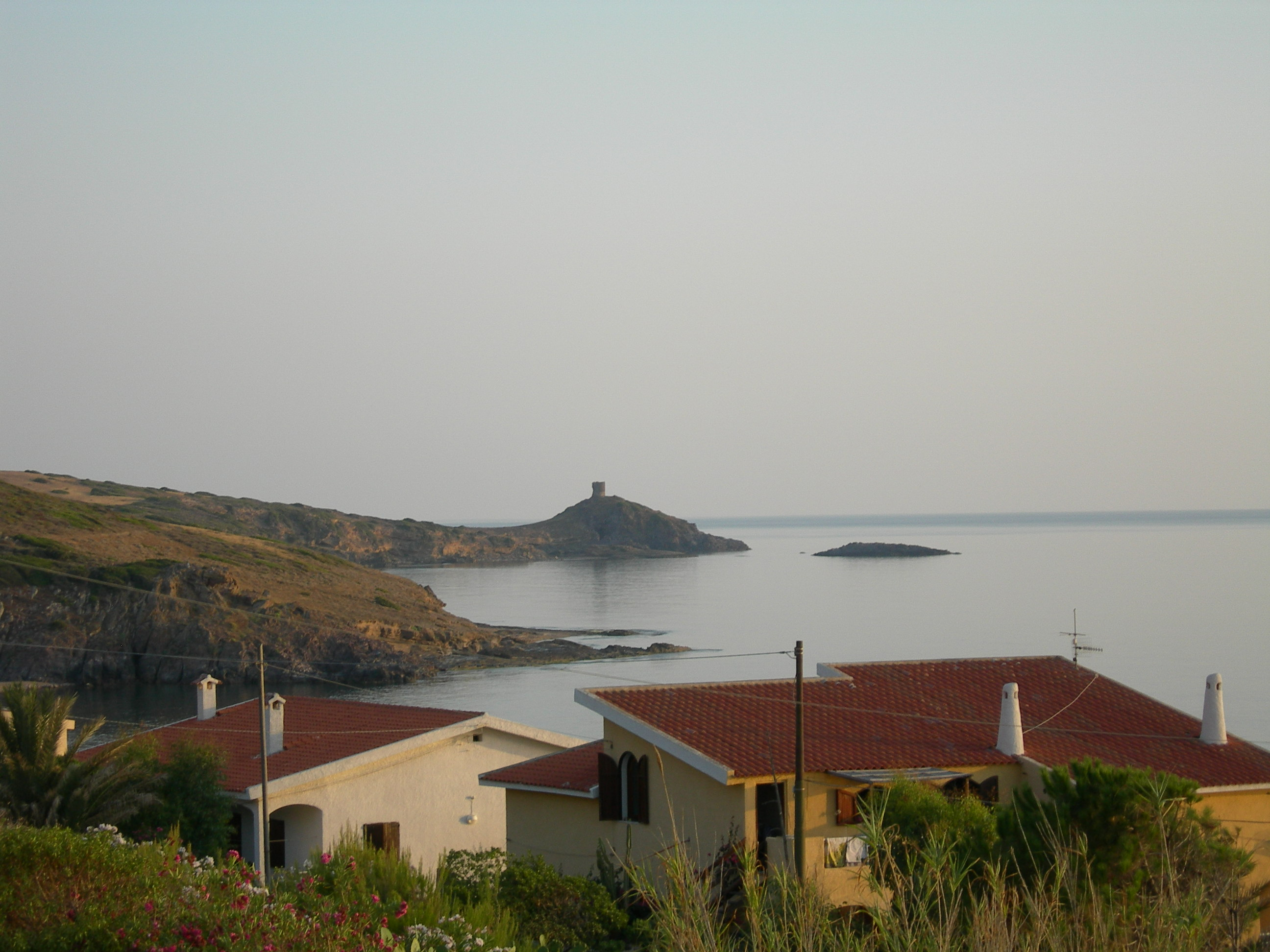
The Tower of Columbargia as seen from Porto Alabe, a località in the Comune of Tresnuraghes

== Geography ==
Tresnuraghes borders the following municipalities: Cuglieri, Flussio, Magomadas, Sennariolo.

== Festivals ==
The Feast of Saint Mark is a traditional Sardinian feste, the most important one, which is a time of excess consumption that helps solidify the social community. Local shepherd families in this predominantly pastoral community offer sheep and oversee cooking them in a gesture of thanks to Providence. Other families offer bread as thanksgiving or for favors desired. Hundreds of people, mostly from Tresnuraghes, but a large number of outsiders as well, eat and drink to satiation together.

== Demographic evolution ==
Historical population

Year	Pop.	±%
1861	1,565	—
1871	1,666	+6.5%
1881	1,787	+7.3%
1901	2,039	+14.1%
1911	2,233	+9.5%

Year	Pop.	±%
1921	2,171	−2.8%
1931	2,184	+0.6%
1936	2,262	+3.6%
1951	2,138	−5.5%
1961	2,053	−4.0%

Year	Pop.	±%
1971	1,764	−14.1%
1981	1,601	−9.2%
1991	1,380	−13.8%
2001	1,296	−6.1%

Source: Data from ISTAT
