= San Vero Milis =

San Vero Milis Santeru
- Comune
- Comune di San Vero Milis
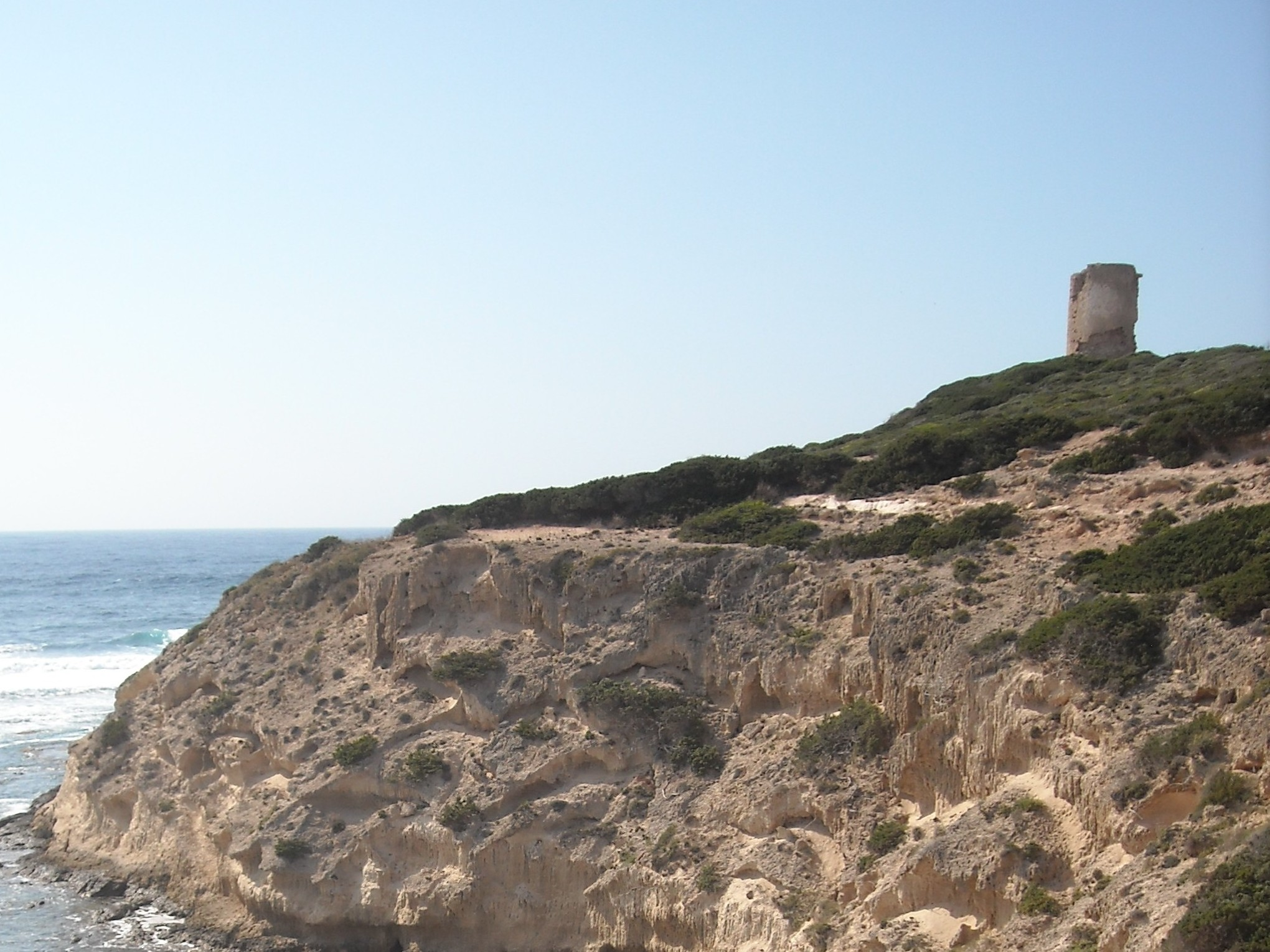
- The tower of Cape Mannu

- Location within Sardinia
- Coordinates: 40°1′N 8°36′E
- Country: Italy
- Region: Sardinia
- Province: Province of Oristano (OR)

Area
  - Total: 72.2 km^{2} (27.9 sq mi)

Population (Dec. 2004)
  - Total: 2,506
  - Density: 34.7/km^{2} (89.9/sq mi)
- Time zone: UTC+1 (CET)
  - Summer (DST): UTC+2 (CEST)
- Postal code: 09070
- Dialing code: 0783

San Vero Milis (Sardinian: Sant' Eru) is a comune (municipality) in the Province of Oristano in the Italian region Sardinia, located about 100 kilometres (62 mi) northwest of Cagliari and about 13 kilometres (8 mi) north of Oristano. As of 31 December 2004, it had a population of 2,506 and an area of 72.2 square kilometres (27.9 mi^{2}).

San Vero Milis borders the following municipalities: Baratili San Pietro, Milis, Narbolia, Riola Sardo, Tramatza, Zeddiani.

== Demographic evolution ==
Historical population

Year	Pop.	±%
1861	2,145	—
1871	2,132	−0.6%
1881	2,100	−1.5%
1901	1,988	−5.3%
1911	2,032	+2.2%

Year	Pop.	±%
1921	2,028	−0.2%
1931	2,000	−1.4%
1936	2,096	+4.8%
1951	2,309	+10.2%
1961	2,505	+8.5%

Year	Pop.	±%
1971	2,316	−7.5%
1981	2,385	+3.0%
1991	2,419	+1.4%
2001	2,403	−0.7%

Source: Data from ISTAT
