= Narbolia =

Narbolia Narabuia
- Comune
- Comune di Narbolia
- Location within Sardinia
- Coordinates: 40°3′N 8°35′E
- Country: Italy
- Region: Sardinia
- Province: Province of Oristano (OR)

Area
  - Total: 40.5 km^{2} (15.6 sq mi)

Population (Dec. 2017)
  - Total: 1,784
  - Density: 44.0/km^{2} (114/sq mi)
- Time zone: UTC+1 (CET)
  - Summer (DST): UTC+2 (CEST)
- Postal code: 09070
- Dialing code: 0783

Narbolia (Sardinian: Narabuìa) is a comune (municipality) in the Province of Oristano in the Italian region Sardinia, located about 100 kilometres (62 mi), northwest of Cagliari and about 15 kilometres (9 mi), north of Oristano. As of 31 December 2016, it had a population of 1,784 and an area of 40.5 square kilometres (15.6 mi^{2}). This comune is famous in Sardinia for the "Zippole"; a typical food for carnival in Italian "carnevale". There is an 18-hole golf course set in the pine forest with a five star hotel with a beach 6 kilometres (4 mi) long.

Narbolia borders the following municipalities: Cuglieri, Riola Sardo, San Vero Milis, Seneghe, Milis, Putzu Idu.

== Demographic evolution ==
Historical population

Year	Pop.	±%
1861	1,332	—
1871	1,338	+0.5%
1881	1,327	−0.8%
1901	1,333	+0.5%
1911	1,407	+5.6%

Year	Pop.	±%
1921	1,447	+2.8%
1931	1,485	+2.6%
1936	1,477	−0.5%
1951	1,530	+3.6%
1961	1,608	+5.1%

Year	Pop.	±%
1971	1,655	+2.9%
1981	1,621	−2.1%
1991	1,691	+4.3%
2001	1,737	+2.7%

Source: Data from ISTAT
