= Johannes Milis =

Doctor of the laws and advocate

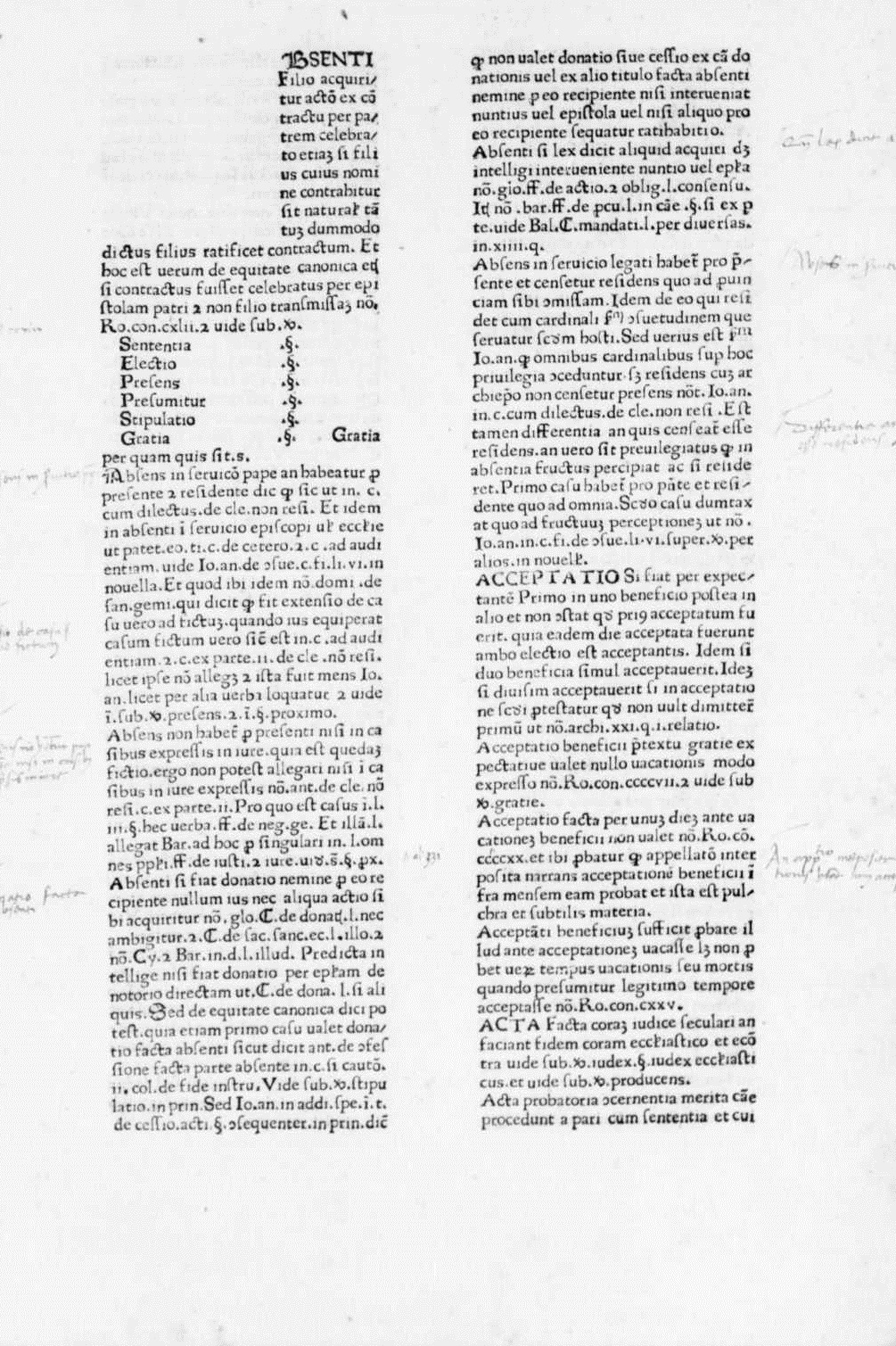
Repertorium iuris, 1475

Johannes Nicolaus de Milis, from Verona (or from Brescia according to other sources), was doctor of the laws and advocate, active in Rome during the first half of the 15th century. He wrote a legal repertorium between about 1430 and 1440.

== Literary works ==
- Allegationes in causa Brabantina matrimoniali pro Duce
- Repertorium iuris (in Latin). Rome: Georg Lauer. 1475.
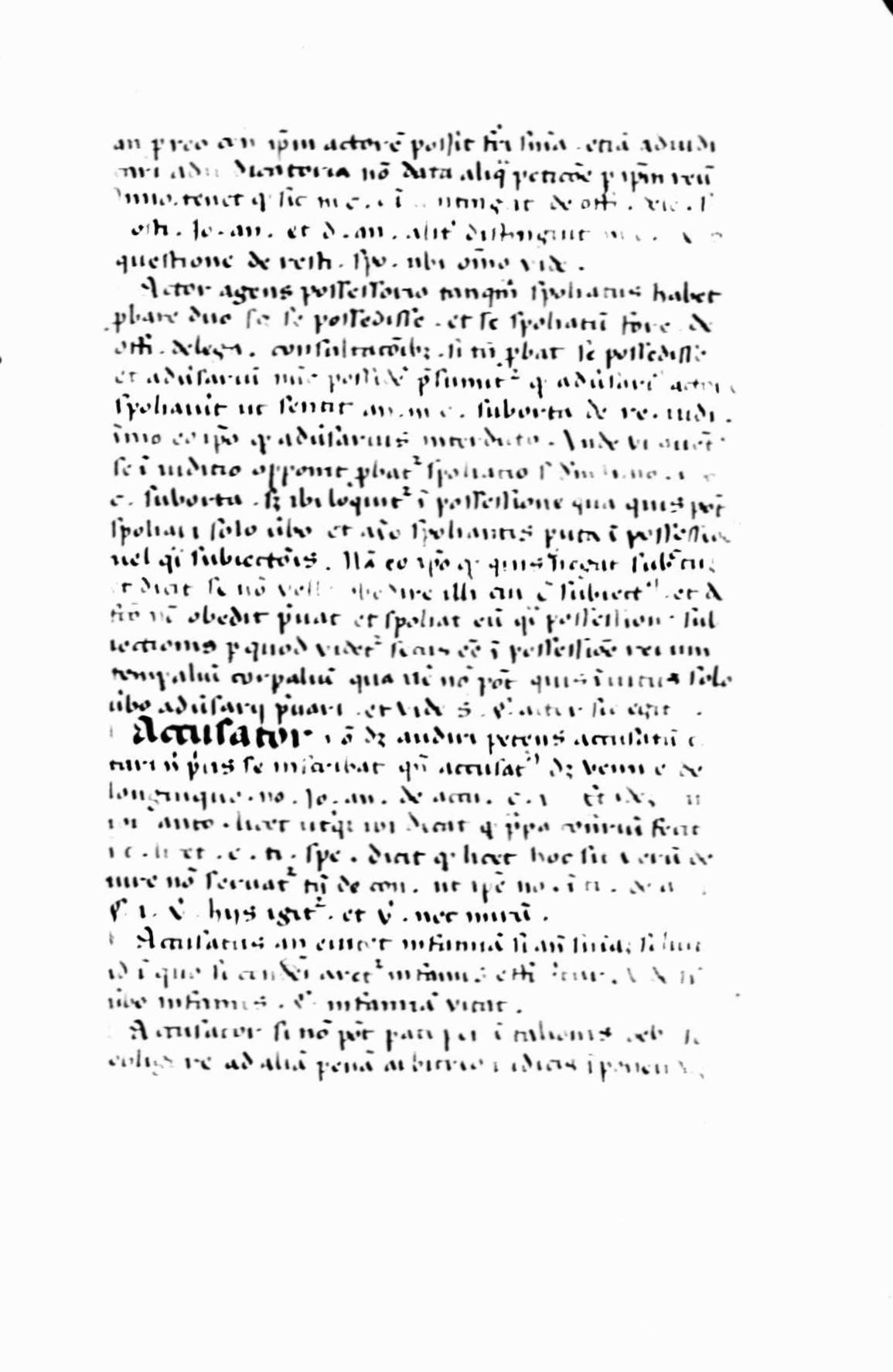
Repertorium iuris canonci (repertorium 'Absenti'), 15th-century manuscript. St. Gallen, Stiftsbibliothek, Handschriften, Cod. Sang. 696.
