= Sennariolo =

Sennariolo Sinnariolo
- Comune
- Comune di Sennariolo
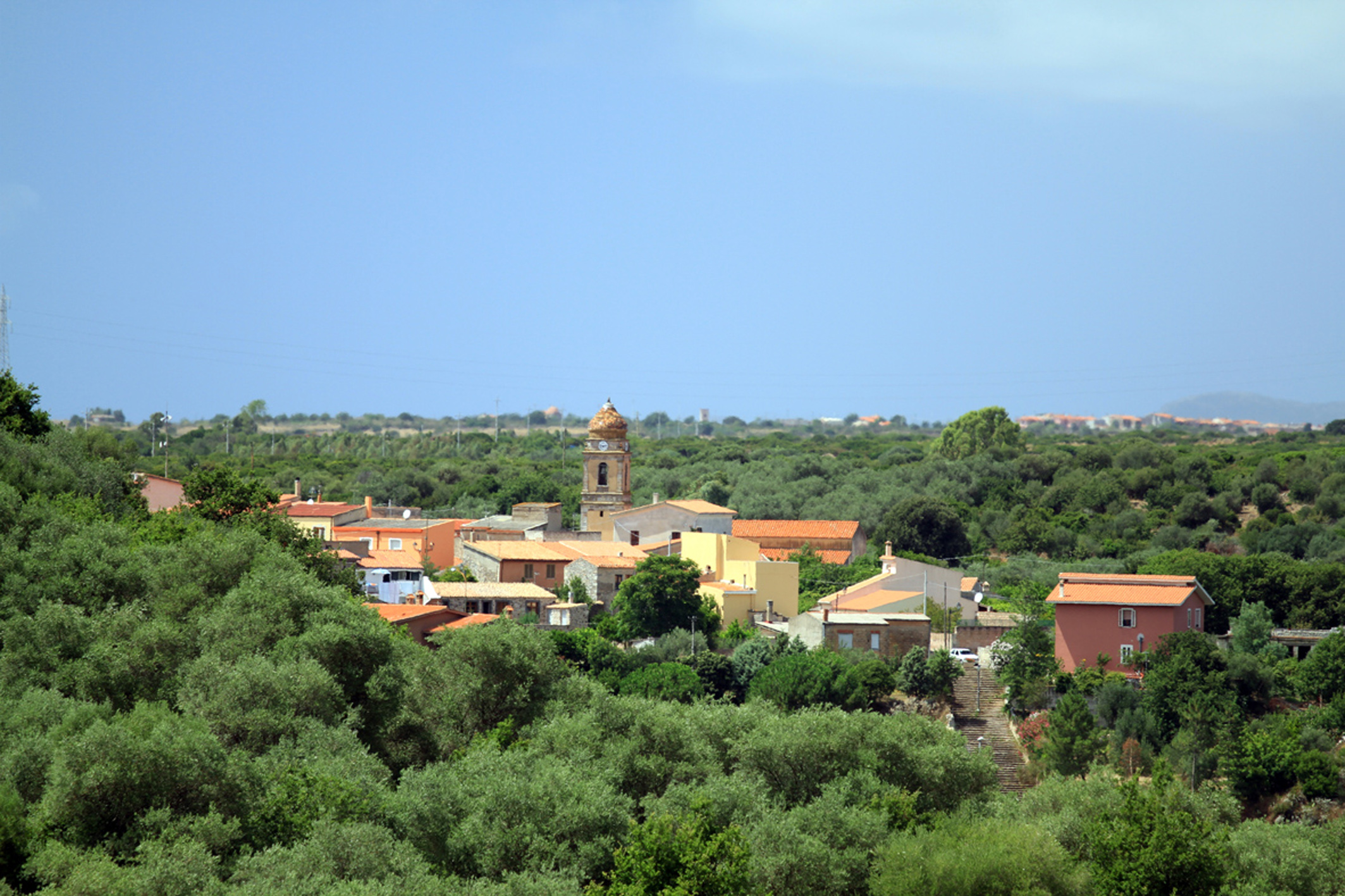

- Location within Sardinia
- Coordinates: 40°13′N 8°33′E
- Country: Italy
- Region: Sardinia
- Province: Province of Oristano (OR)

Area
  - Total: 15.7 km^{2} (6.1 sq mi)

Population (Dec. 2004)
  - Total: 185
  - Density: 11.8/km^{2} (30.5/sq mi)
- Time zone: UTC+1 (CET)
  - Summer (DST): UTC+2 (CEST)
- Postal code: 09078
- Dialing code: 0785

Sennariolo is a comune (municipality) located about 120 kilometres (75 mi) northwest of Cagliari and about 35 kilometres (22 mi) north of Oristano in the Province of Oristano, Sardinia, Italy. As of 31 December 2004, it had a population of 185 and an area of 15.7 square kilometres (6.1 mi^{2}).

Sennariolo borders the following municipalities: Cuglieri, Flussio, Scano di Montiferro, Tresnuraghes.

== Demographic evolution ==
Historical population

| Year | Pop. | ±% |
|---|---|---|
| 1861 | 4,450 | — |
| 1871 | 3,933 | −11.6% |
| 1881 | 3,812 | −3.1% |
| 1901 | 5,065 | +32.9% |
| 1911 | 5,077 | +0.2% |

| Year | Pop. | ±% |
|---|---|---|
| 1921 | 4,382 | −13.7% |
| 1931 | 4,217 | −3.8% |
| 1936 | 4,492 | +6.5% |
| 1951 | 4,155 | −7.5% |
| 1961 | 3,568 | −14.1% |

| Year | Pop. | ±% |
|---|---|---|
| 1971 | 2,613 | −26.8% |
| 1981 | 2,728 | +4.4% |
| 1991 | 2,042 | −25.1% |
| 2001 | 1,735 | −15.0% |

Source: Data from ISTAT
