= Bonarcado =

Bonarcado Bonaccattu (Sardinian)
- Comune
- Comune di Bonarcado
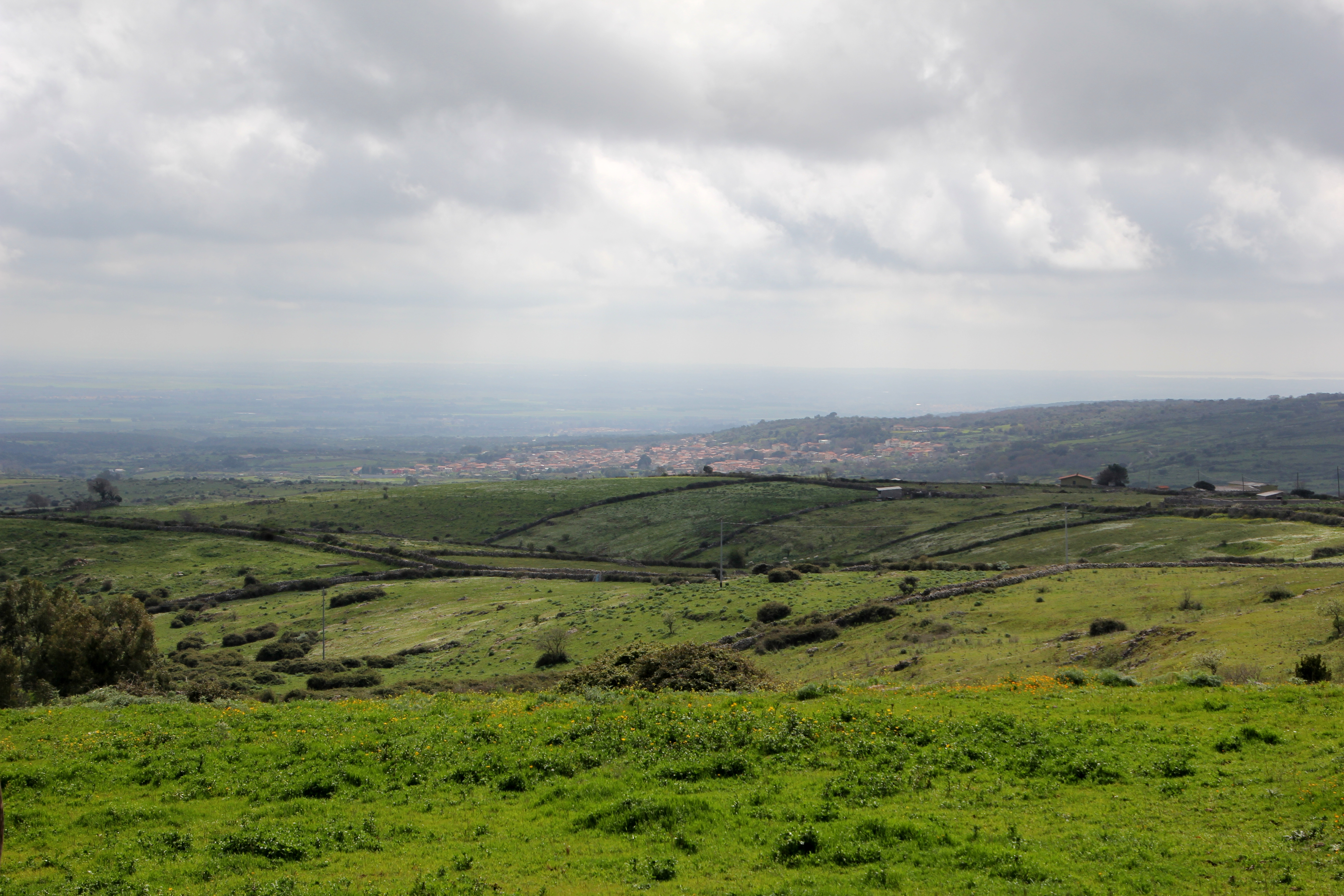

- Coat of arms

- Location within Sardinia
- Coordinates: 40°6′N 8°39′E
- Country: Italy
- Region: Sardinia
- Province: Oristano (OR)

Government
  - Mayor: Mario Sassu

Area
  - Total: 28.41 km^{2} (10.97 sq mi)
- Elevation: 284 m (932 ft)

Population (2026)
  - Total: 1,521
  - Density: 53.54/km^{2} (138.7/sq mi)
- Demonym(s): Bonarcadesi; Bonarcadesos
- Time zone: UTC+1 (CET)
  - Summer (DST): UTC+2 (CEST)
- Postal code: 09070
- Dialing code: 0783

Bonarcado (Sardinian: Bonaccattu) is a town and comune (municipality) in the Province of Oristano in the autonomous island region of Sardinia in Italy, located about 110 kilometres (68 mi) northwest of Cagliari and about 25 kilometres (16 mi) north of Oristano. It has 1,521 inhabitants.

Bonarcado borders the municipalities of Bauladu, Milis, Paulilatino, Santu Lussurgiu, and Seneghe.

== Demographics ==
As of 2026, the population is 1,521, of which 49.4% are male, and 50.6% are female. Minors make up 14.8% of the population, and seniors make up 29.3%.

Historical population

Year	Pop.	±%
1861	1,393	—
1871	1,350	−3.1%
1881	1,418	+5.0%
1901	1,366	−3.7%
1911	1,406	+2.9%
1921	1,424	+1.3%
1931	1,504	+5.6%
1936	1,638	+8.9%

Year	Pop.	±%
1951	1,833	+11.9%
1961	1,843	+0.5%
1971	1,896	+2.9%
1981	1,677	−11.6%
1991	1,762	+5.1%
2001	1,702	−3.4%
2011	1,627	−4.4%
2021	1,519	−6.6%

Source: ISTAT

=== Immigration ===
As of 2025, of the known countries of birth of 1,498 residents, the most numerous are: Italy (1,458 – 97.3%), Germany (13 – 0.9%).
