= Erro (river) =

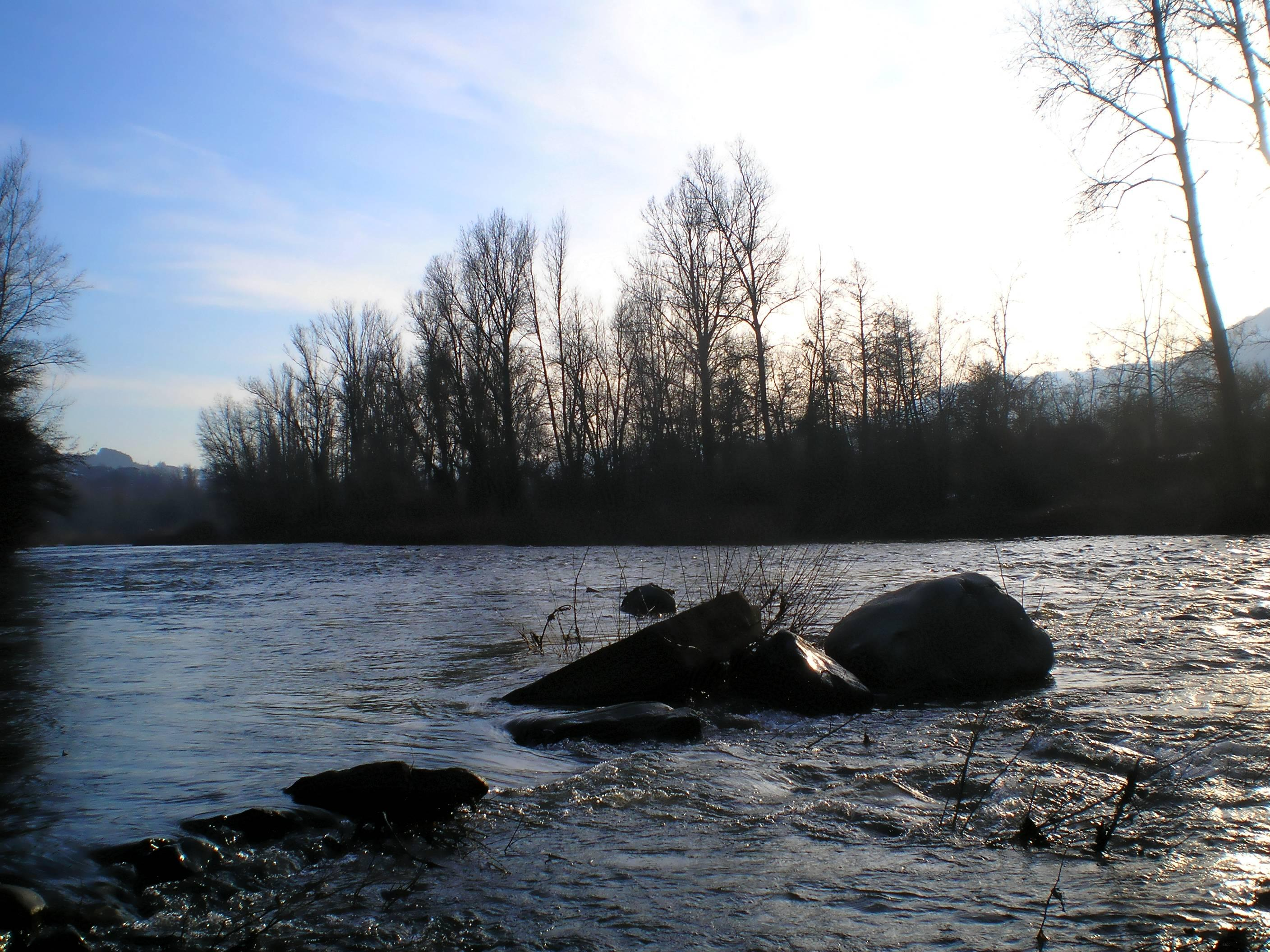

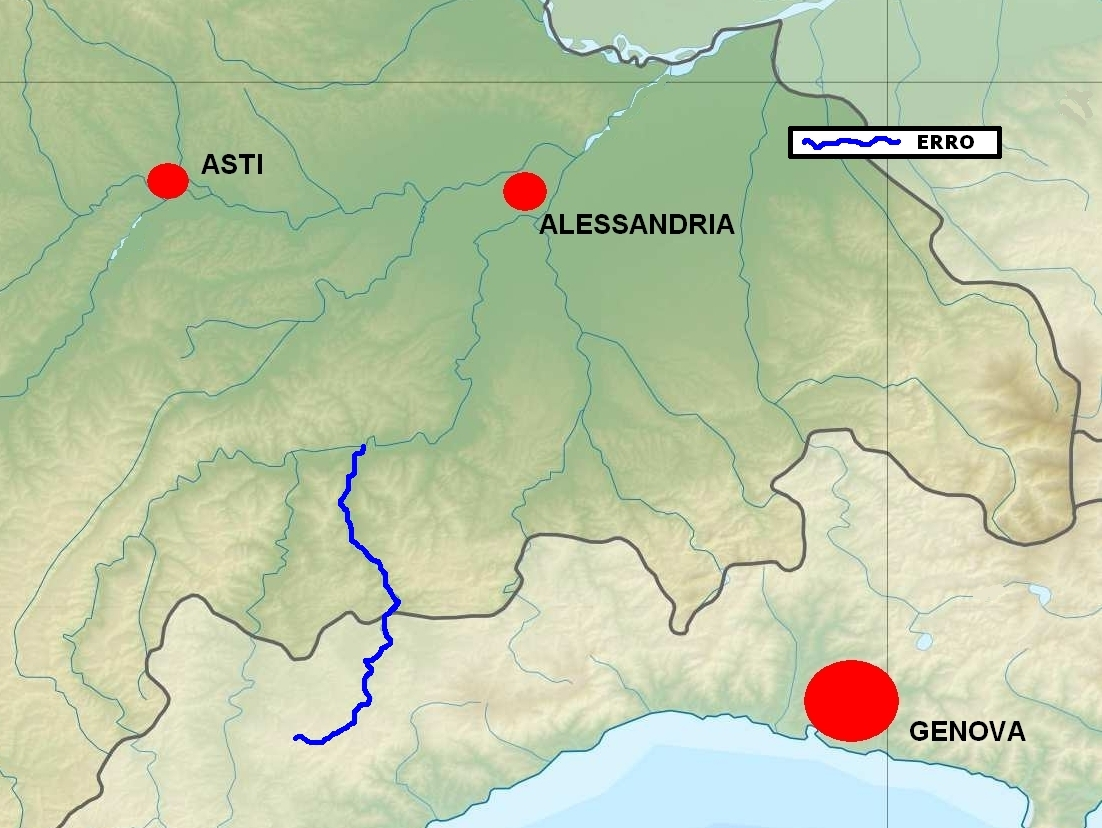

Location
- Country: Italy

Physical characteristics
- Source
  - location: Monte Ermetta
- Mouth
  - location: Bormida at Terzo (AL)
  - coordinates: 44.6645°N 8.4297°E
  - elevation: 222 m (728 ft)
- Length: 46.5 km (28.9 mi)
- Basin size: 246.9 km^{2} (95.3 mi^{2})
- Discharge
  - average: 4.6 m^{3}/s (160 cu ft/s)

Basin features
- Progression: Bormida→ Tanaro→ Po→ Adriatic Sea

The Erro (in Piedmontese Er) is a 46-kilometre (29 mi) torrent of north-west Italy, a right tributary of the Bormida.

== Geography ==
The river rises in the Ligurian Province of Savona at an elevation 1,267 metres (4,157 ft) on Monte Ermetta, to the west of Monte Beigua. Having passed through the territory of Sassello, the river enters the Piedmontese Province of Alessandria at Ponte Erro (Malvicino). Its course takes it past Cartosio, Rivere, Castelletto d'Erro, Arzello, and Melazzo before joining the Bormida at Terzo, a little upstream from Acqui Terme at an elevation of 222 metres (728 ft).

== Sources ==
The initial version of this article was a translation from it:Erro (torrente), its counterpart in the Italian Wikipedia.
