= Bormida =

Bormida may refer to:

- Bormida (river), a river of northwest Italy
  - Bormida di Spigno, a tributary
- Bormida, Liguria, a town in the Province of Savona, Italy
- Italian ship Bormida (A 5359), an Italian Navy water tanker commissioned in 1974
- Eliana Bórmida (born 1946), Argentine architect
