= Battle of Voltri =

Battle of the War of the First Coalition

Coordinates: 44°25′40″N 8°45′10″E

- Part of the Montenotte campaign in the Italian campaign of 1796–1797
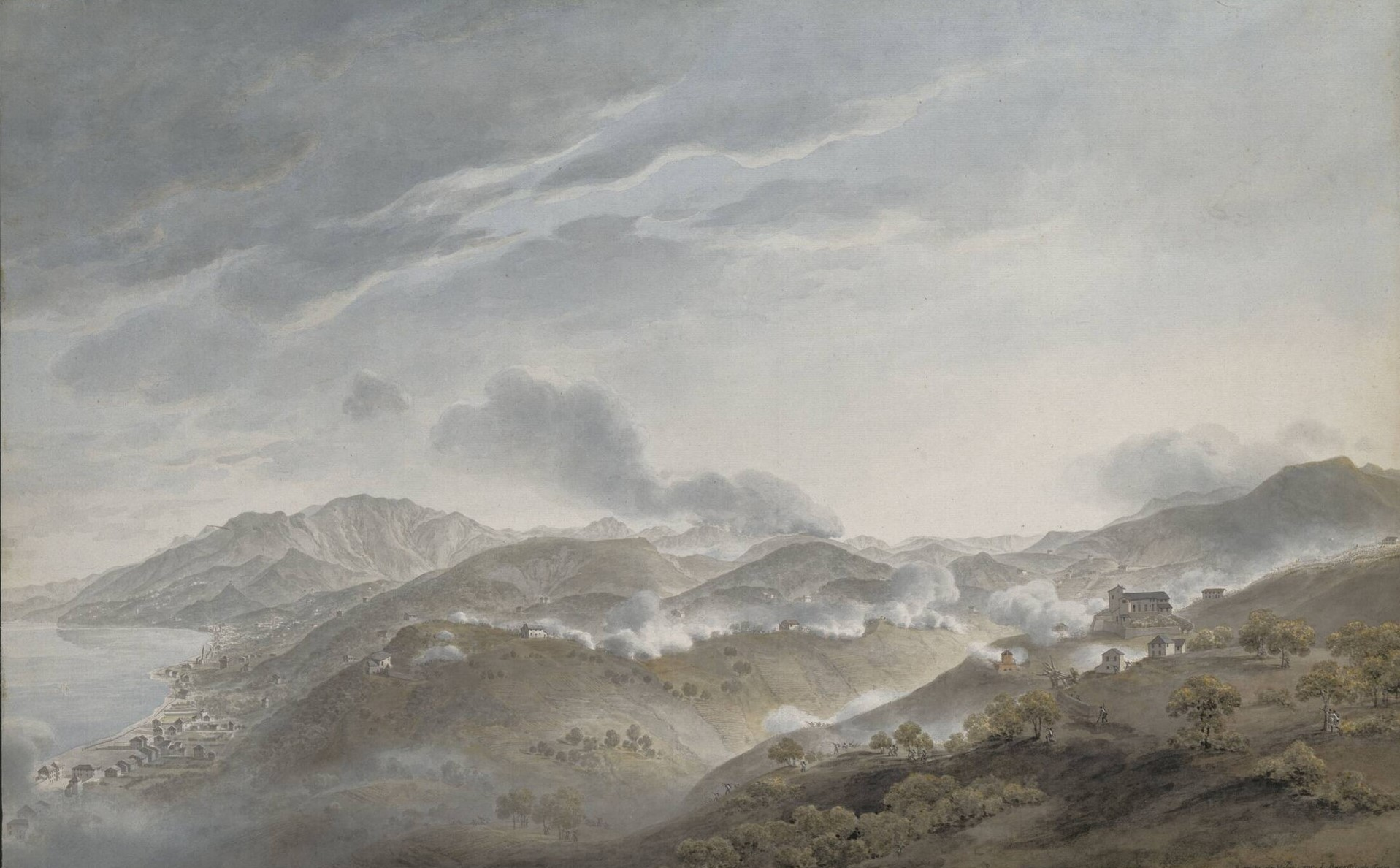
- View of Voltri, 10 April 1796 by Giuseppe Pietro Bagetti, 1802–1806
Date	10 April 1796
Location	Voltri, Republic of Genoa
Result	Austrian victory

Belligerents
(France) French Republic	(Habsburg monarchy) Habsburg Austria

Commanders and leaders
(France) Jean-Baptiste Cervoni	(Habsburg monarchy) Johann Beaulieu (Habsburg monarchy) Karl Sebottendorf (Habsburg monarchy) Philipp Pittoni

Strength
5,200	7,200

Casualties and losses
227	50

The Battle of Voltri was fought on 10 April 1796 in Voltri, Italy, during the War of the First Coalition. The battle saw two Habsburg Austrian columns under the overall direction of Johann Peter Beaulieu attack a reinforced French brigade under Jean-Baptiste Cervoni. After a skirmish lasting several hours, the Austrians forced Cervoni to withdraw west along the coast to Savona. Voltri is now part of the western suburbs of the major Italian port of Genoa. The battle was the opening engagement of the Montenotte campaign and the broader Italian campaign of 1796-1797, which would ultimately end the war a year later.

In the spring of 1796, Beaulieu was installed as the new commander of the combined armies of Austria and the Kingdom of Sardinia-Piedmont in northwest Italy. His opposite number was also new to the job of army commander. Napoleon Bonaparte arrived from Paris to direct the French Army of Italy. Bonaparte immediately began planning an offensive, but Beaulieu struck first by launching an attack against Cervoni's somewhat overextended force. After the action, the Austrian commander found himself in a position in which it was difficult to march to the support of his right wing. Seizing this opening, Bonaparte counterattacked the Austrian right flank in the Battle of Montenotte on 12 April.

== Background ==
See the Montenotte 1796 Campaign Order of Battle for units and organizations of the French, Austrian, and Sardinian armies.

In mid-March, Johann Peter Beaulieu was appointed commander of the Austrian Army of Italy and promoted to Feldzeugmeister. Despite his 70 years, the veteran of the War of the Austrian Succession and Seven Years' War was regarded with favor by the Austrian Foreign Minister Johann Amadeus Francis de Paula, Baron of Thugut, who liked his energy. In addition, Beaulieu shared a personal friendship with Feldmarschall-Leutnant Michelangelo Alessandro Colli-Marchi an Austrian subject who led the allied Sardinian army.

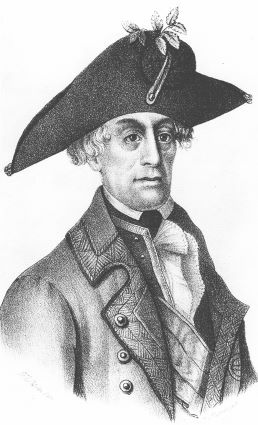
Johann Peter Beaulieu

Unfortunately for Beaulieu, his government warned him of the possibility that Sardinia might make peace with France or even switch sides. This ruined any chance of a cooperative relationship between the two allies. The situation was further aggravated by the fact that the lines of communications of the two armies ran in divergent paths. Beaulieu also had at his disposal 1,500 allied cavalry from the Kingdom of Naples and Sicily. The Austrian soldiers had suffered severely that winter. The new army commander notified his government that a shocking total of 927 soldiers had died of sickness in February. Altogether, the allied armies counted 17,000 Sardinians and 32,000 Austrians. Of this total, Colli's army included 4,000 Austrians under Feldmarschall-Leutnant Giovanni Marchese di Provera in the Auxiliary Corps. The paper strength of Beaulieu's army was 32,000 infantry, 5,000 cavalry, and 148 artillery pieces, but these were not the actual numbers.

Beaulieu's army was deployed in two wings. His right wing was led by Field-Marshal-Lieutenant Eugène-Guillaume Argenteau and included 9,000 infantry and 340 cavalry in 11 battalions and two squadrons. As late as 10 April, these troops were thinly deployed across a wide area and separated by poor roads. There were four battalions near Sassello, two battalions at Mioglia, and one battalion each at Cairo, Dego, Malvicino, Pareto, and Acqui. The left wing was commanded by Feldmarschall-Leutnant Karl Philipp Sebottendorf. Of the 19,500 troops of the left wing, only half were available for use in the field while the rest was dispersed in garrisons. Against these forces, the French Army of Italy counted 63,000 men. Of these, only 37,000 soldiers and 60 artillery pieces were available for the field army. Another 7,000 troops in two small divisions guarded the Col de Tende on the direct road from Nice to Cuneo.

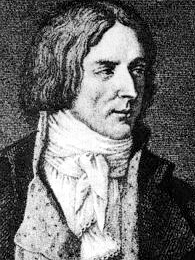
Antoine Christophe Saliceti

In March 1796, the representative-on-mission with the Army of Italy, Antoine Christophe Saliceti tried without success to secure a loan from the neutral Republic of Genoa. Saliceti decided to threaten the Genoese authorities into agreeing to the loan. The French army commander General of Division Barthélemy Louis Joseph Schérer acceded to Saliceti's request and ordered 6,000 men to prepare for the movement. Strategically the idea was risky because it extended the French position an additional 28 miles (45 km) eastward along the Italian Riviera.

On 24 March, General of Brigade Jean Joseph Magdeleine Pijon left Savona and marched toward Genoa with two demi-brigades. Three days later, Austrian General-major Philipp Pittoni von Dannenfeld reported to Beaulieu that the French had occupied Voltri. About this time, General of Division Napoleon Bonaparte replaced Schérer and ordered the movement suspended on the 28th. At first he wanted to withdraw the exposed unit, but later decided to hold the position at Voltri.

Beaulieu was alarmed at the French move. To put a stop to this threat, he ordered Pittoni on 31 March to invade the Republic of Genoa and cross the Bocchetta Pass. Brushing aside Genoese protests, Pittoni occupied Novi Ligure and sent his men on the road up the pass. One battalion was left to guard Novi. Beaulieu, who accompanied the move, noted that the weather was bitterly cold and that Pittoni was sick, though the general persevered in his duty. The Austrian commander-in-chief sent four artillery pieces with Pittoni's force, one 12-pound cannon, one 6-pound cannon, and two 7-pound howitzers. Pijon also became ill and was replaced in command of the Voltri force by General of Brigade Jean-Baptiste Cervoni.

Pittoni was in possession of the Bocchetta Pass on 8 April, but reported to Beaulieu that it would take six hours of marching over bad roads to contact Colonel Josef Philipp Vukassovich's command near Masone. For his part, Vukassovich sent a communication to his army commander that he was isolated from Argenteau on his right and Pittoni on his left. One of Argenteau's brigadiers, General-major Mathias Rukavina von Boynograd reported from his position at Sassello that it would take eight hours of hard marching to reach Dego to his west. Being isolated from one another, the components of Beaulieu's army were not in a good position to launch an offensive.

== Battle ==
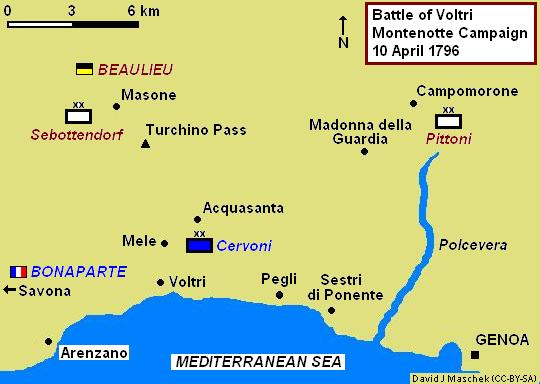
Map of the Battle of Voltri, 10 April 1796

On the morning of 10 April, Pittoni's column consisted of four squadrons of the Mészáros Uhlans, two battalions of the Reisky Infantry Regiment Nr. 13, and one battalion each of the Terzi Infantry Regiment Nr. 16, Nádasdy Infantry Regiment Nr. 39, and Szluiner Grenz Infantry Regiment Nr. 63. Pittoni's force numbered 3,350 infantry and 624 cavalry. Sebottendorf's 3,200-man division included two battalions of the Wenzel Colloredo Infantry Regiment Nr. 56, the 2nd Battalion of the Carlstädter Grenz Infantry Regiment, and single battalions of the Alvinczi Infantry Regiment Nr. 19 and Lattermann Infantry Regiment Nr. 45. Accompanied by Beaulieu, Sebottendorf's column was directed to cross the Turchino Pass north of Voltri.

Cervoni's defenders included approximately 2,000 soldiers in two battalions of the 51st Line Infantry Regiment, 3,181 men of the 75th Line Infantry Demi-Brigade, and three companies of grenadiers of the 51st led by Chef de brigade Jean Lannes. The French army had undergone an amalgame in early March and received new regiment numbers. For example, the 51st was formerly the 99th and the 75th was the 70th. Another source put French numbers at 3,500 and Austrian strength at 10,000.

On 9 April, the 75th Line was engaged in skirmishing all day. Cervoni disposed his troops from Pegli to Bric Ghigermasso, a height that dominated the road from Turchino Pass. French outposts extended into the mountains. Pittoni detached 250 volunteers to cover his right flank by moving through the Shrine of Nostra Signora della Guardia. While the flank guard moved out at 8:00 AM, Pittoni's main body did not march from Campomorone until 11:00 AM. The force moved down to the coast, turned west to cross the Polcevera stream, and entered the village of Sestri di Polente. On the other flank, Sebottendorf's column cleared a French outpost from Masone village about 2:00 PM and began crossing the Turchino Pass. Leading the column, Vukassovich directed three companies of Grenzers to bear left and attack the hamlet of Acquasanta, while three more advanced on their right. The Alvinczi battalion supported these efforts. Lannes led the defense in this sector and he carried out a fighting withdrawal with few casualties.

Led by four companies of Grenzers under Beaulieu's son-in-law Captain Gustave Maelcamp and the 250 volunteers, Pittoni's column began pressing the 75th Line near Pegli at 3:00 PM. They captured two hills near Pegli in a bayonet attack. Under Chef de brigade Jacques-Antoine de Chambarlhac de Laubespin, the 75th Line held out in the Pegli area until around 6:00 PM when they withdrew to avoid being cut off. Four companies were briefly surrounded but they were able to break out. By 7:00 PM the bulk of the 75th Line was able to shake off Austrian pursuit and fall back along the coast. In the sector facing the Turchino Pass, the French defenders fell back to a fortification at Mele around 5:00 PM. Cervoni evacuated Mele when Vukassovich threatened to turn his left flank.

== Result ==
Pittoni occupied Voltri that evening with three battalions and his cavalry. He was joined by Beaulieu around midnight. The Austrians captured two French officers and some soldiers in the town, as well as 200 sacks of flour. Total Austrian losses were probably no more than 50 casualties. Of these, the Carlstädter battalion lost only nine wounded. One authority estimated 250 French casualties. The 75th Line reported one officer killed and seven wounded or missing. Losses in the rank and file were 16 killed, 45 wounded, and 148 captured. These figures give a total of 217. Admitted losses in the 51st Line were two killed, six wounded, and two missing.

Historian David G. Chandler wrote that Cervoni executed a "masterly retreat" to avoid being trapped. As Martin Boycott-Brown pointed out, Beaulieu committed a serious blunder by moving his left wing over the Bocchetta Pass. The Austrian advance to the coast near Genoa put a mountain range between the left wing and Argenteau's vulnerable right wing. Beaulieu would have been better advised to apply an indirect strategy than the direct move that he made. On 12 April, Bonaparte scored a victory over Argenteau in the Battle of Montenotte. This action drove a wedge between the Austrian and Sardinian armies.

== See also ==
- Montenotte Campaign
- Battle of Montenotte, 12 April 1796
- Battle of Millesimo, 13 April 1796
- Second Battle of Dego, 14–15 April 1796
- Battle of Ceva, 16 April 1796
- Battle of Mondovì, 21 April 1796
