= Montechiaro =

Montechiaro could refer to:

- Montechiaro d'Asti - a town and comune in the Province of Asti, Italy
- Montechiaro d'Acqui - a town and comune in the Province of Alessandria, Italy
- Palma di Montechiaro - a town and comune of Sicily
- The medieval Castel Montechiaro (castle of Montechiaro) in Rivergaro

== See also ==
- Montichiari, a town and comune in the province of Brescia, Italy
