= Monastero Bormida =

- Comune
- Comune di Monastero Bormida
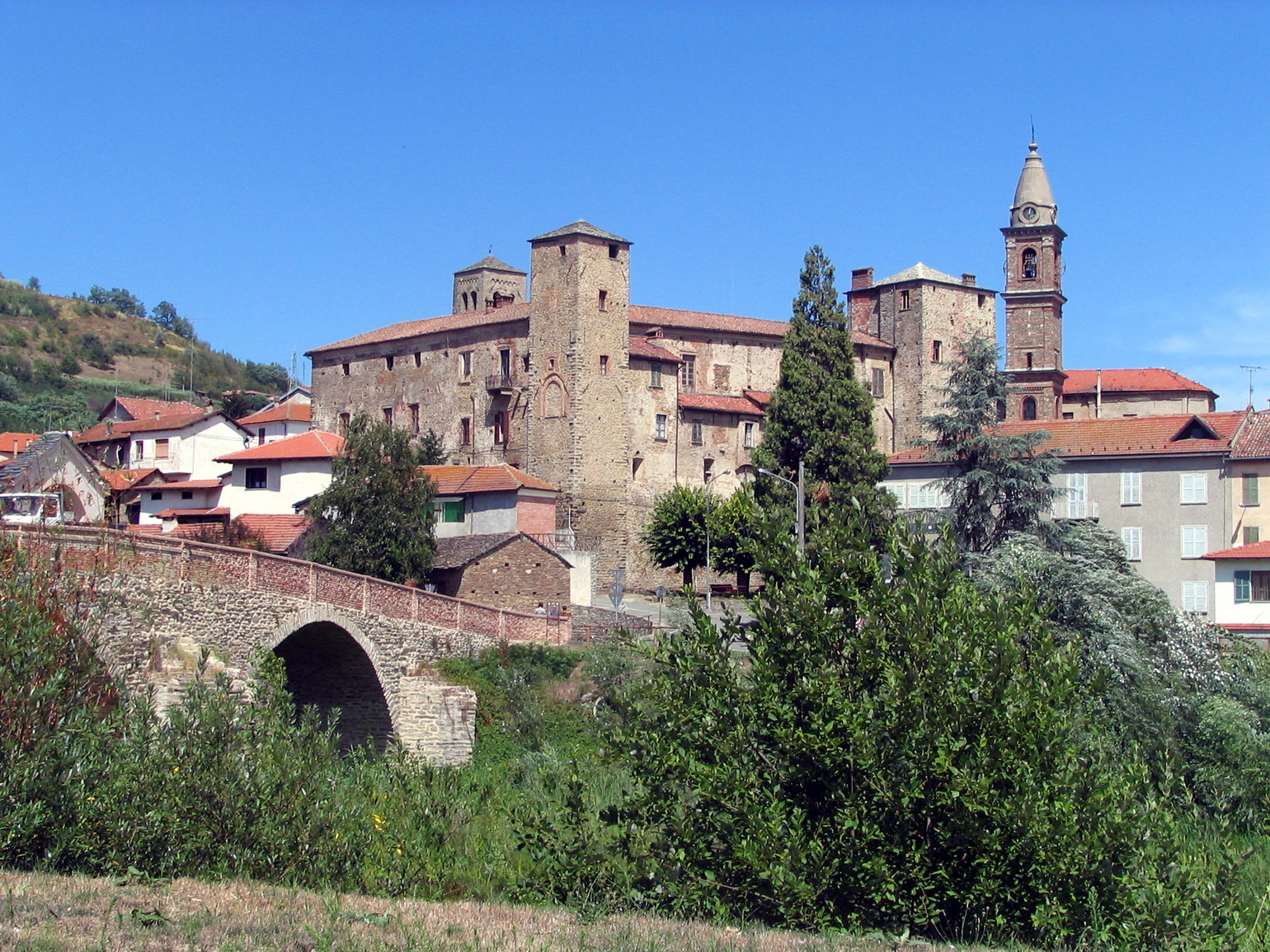
- View of Monastero Bormida

- Coat of arms

- Location within Italy Location within Piedmont
- Coordinates: 44°39′N 8°20′E
- Country: Italy
- Region: Piedmont
- Province: Asti (AT)

Government
  - Mayor: Ambrogio Spiota

Area
  - Total: 14.1 km^{2} (5.4 sq mi)
- Elevation: 191 m (627 ft)

Population (31 December 2010)
  - Total: 1,002
  - Density: 71.1/km^{2} (184/sq mi)
- Demonym: Monasteresi
- Time zone: UTC+1 (CET)
  - Summer (DST): UTC+2 (CEST)
- Postal code: 14058
- Dialing code: 0144
- Website: Official website

Monastero Bormida is a comune (municipality) in the Province of Asti in the Italian region Piedmont. It is located about 70 kilometres (43 mi) southeast of Turin and about 30 kilometres (19 mi) southeast of Asti.

Monastero Bormida borders the following municipalities: Bistagno, Bubbio, Cassinasco, Denice, Loazzolo, Ponti, Roccaverano, and Sessame. It is home to a castle, located near the Bormida river, which originated as an abbey founded around 1050 (whence the town's name), and which has mosaics and frescoes in the interior. There is also a Romanesque bridge crossing the same river.
