= Terzo =

Terzo may refer to:

- Terzo, Piedmont, a town in Piedmont, Italy
- Terzo d'Aquileia, a town in Friuli-Venezia Giulia, Italy
