= Italian ship Bormida (A 5359) =

Italian Navy coastal water tanker

History

Italy
- Name: Bormida
- Namesake: Bormida (river)
- Commissioned: 1974
- In service: 1
- Home port: La Spezia
- Identification: Pennant number: A 5359
- Motto: Facta non verba
- Status: Active
- Notes: ex GGS-1011.

General characteristics
- Type: Coastal Transport ship
- Displacement: - 763 t (751 long tons) full-load; - 471 t (464 long tons) empty
- Length: 40.2 m (131 ft 11 in) LOA
- Beam: 7.2 m (23 ft 7 in)
- Draught: 5.2 m (17 ft 1 in)
- Propulsion: 1 x diesel engine, 96 kW (129 bhp)
- Speed: 7.0 knots (13.0 km/h; 8.1 mph) (maximum speed)
- Complement: 6
- Notes: water capacity: 260 t (260 long tons)

Bormida (A 5359) is an Italian Navy coastal water tanker.

== See also ==
Simeto-class water tanker
