= Montabone =

- Comune
- Comune di Montabone
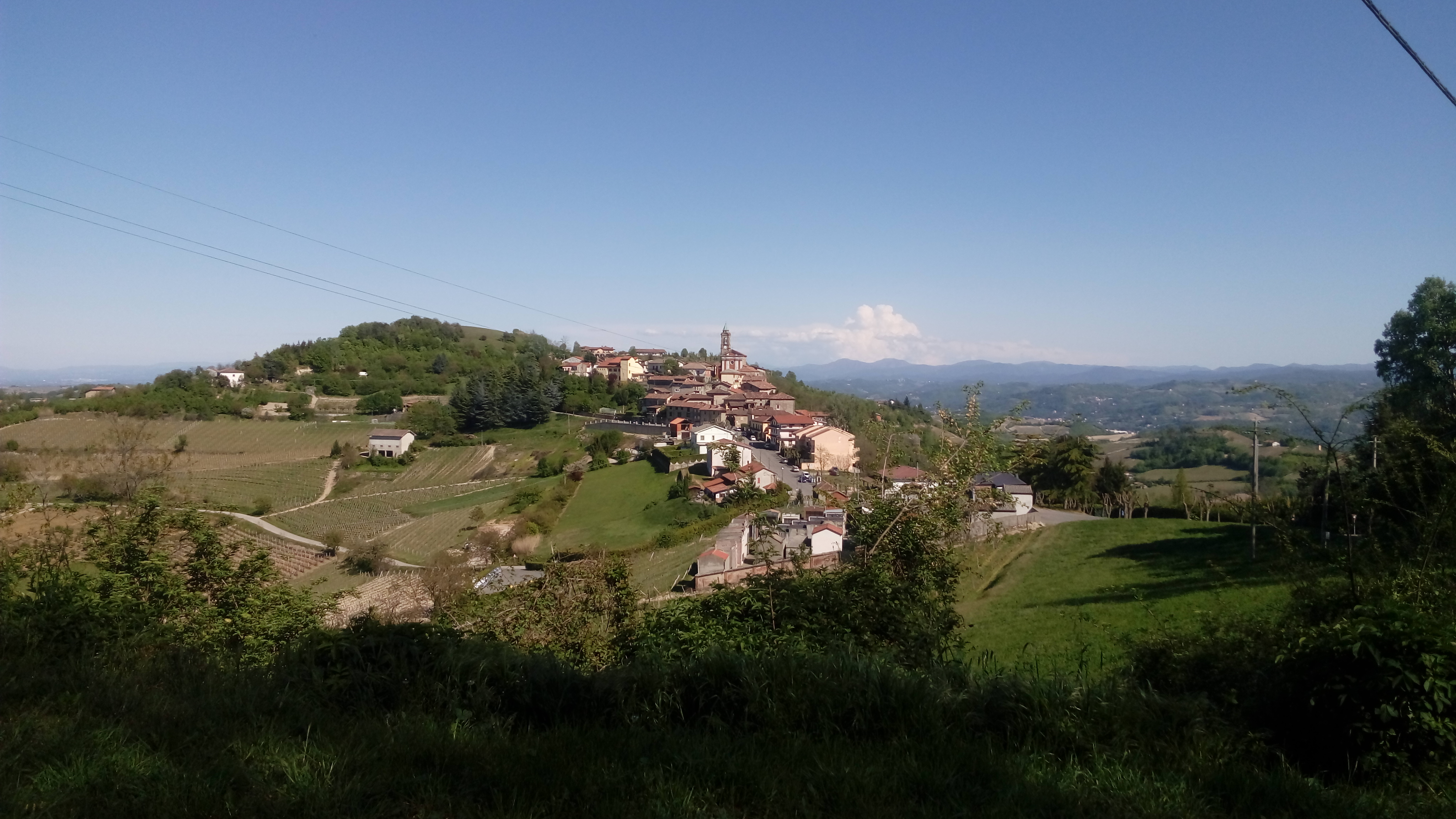
- View of Montabone

- Coat of arms

- Location within Italy Location within Piedmont
- Coordinates: 44°42′N 8°23′E
- Country: Italy
- Region: Piedmont
- Province: Asti (AT)
- Frazioni: Ferraris, Giini, Lacana

Government
  - Mayor: Giuseppe Maurizio Aliardi

Area
  - Total: 8.5 km^{2} (3.3 sq mi)

Population (Dec. 2004)
  - Total: 357
  - Density: 42/km^{2} (110/sq mi)
- Demonym: Montabonesi
- Time zone: UTC+1 (CET)
  - Summer (DST): UTC+2 (CEST)
- Postal code: 14040
- Dialing code: 0141
- Patron saint: St. Anthony Abbot
- Saint day: 17 January
- Website: Official website

Montabone is a comune (municipality) in the Province of Asti in the Italian region Piedmont, located about 70 kilometres (43 mi) southeast of Turin and about 25 kilometres (16 mi) southeast of Asti. As of 31 December 2004, it had a population of 357 and an area of 8.5 square kilometres (3.3 mi^{2}).

Montabone borders the following municipalities: Acqui Terme, Bistagno, Castel Boglione, Castel Rocchero, Rocchetta Palafea, and Terzo.

== Demographic evolution ==
Historical population

| Year | Pop. | ±% |
|---|---|---|
| 1861 | 719 | — |
| 1871 | 742 | +3.2% |
| 1881 | 757 | +2.0% |
| 1901 | 985 | +30.1% |
| 1911 | 1,145 | +16.2% |

| Year | Pop. | ±% |
|---|---|---|
| 1921 | 1,151 | +0.5% |
| 1931 | 1,025 | −10.9% |
| 1936 | 955 | −6.8% |
| 1951 | 796 | −16.6% |
| 1961 | 579 | −27.3% |

| Year | Pop. | ±% |
|---|---|---|
| 1971 | 444 | −23.3% |
| 1981 | 371 | −16.4% |
| 1991 | 382 | +3.0% |
| 2001 | 357 | −6.5% |

Source: Data from ISTAT
