= Cassinasco =

- Comune
- Comune di Cassinasco
- Coat of arms

- Location within Italy Location within Piedmont
- Coordinates: 44°41′N 8°18′E
- Country: Italy
- Region: Piedmont
- Province: Province of Asti (AT)

Area
  - Total: 11.7 km^{2} (4.5 sq mi)

Population (Dec. 2004)
  - Total: 639
  - Density: 54.6/km^{2} (141/sq mi)
- Time zone: UTC+1 (CET)
  - Summer (DST): UTC+2 (CEST)
- Postal code: 14050
- Dialing code: 0141
- Website: comune.cassinasco.at.it

Cassinasco is a comune (municipality) in the Province of Asti in the Italian region Piedmont, located about 60 kilometres (37 mi) southeast of Turin and about 25 kilometres (16 mi) southeast of Asti. As of 31 December 2004, it had a population of 639 and an area of 11.7 square kilometres (4.5 mi^{2}).

Cassinasco borders the following municipalities: Bubbio, Calamandrana, Canelli, Monastero Bormida, Rocchetta Palafea, and Sessame.

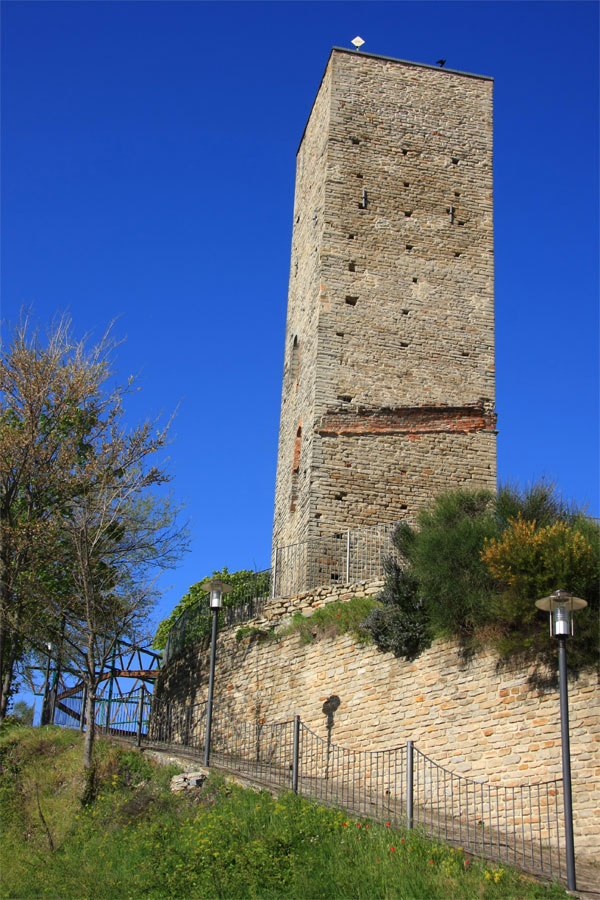
Cassinasco torre

== Demographic evolution ==
Historical population

Year	Pop.	±%
1861	1,016	—
1871	1,193	+17.4%
1881	1,224	+2.6%
1901	1,473	+20.3%
1911	1,510	+2.5%

Year	Pop.	±%
1921	1,451	−3.9%
1931	1,307	−9.9%
1936	1,199	−8.3%
1951	1,007	−16.0%
1961	779	−22.6%

Year	Pop.	±%
1971	661	−15.1%
1981	627	−5.1%
1991	610	−2.7%
2001	592	−3.0%

Source: Data from ISTAT
