= Quaranti =

- Comune
- Comune di Quaranti
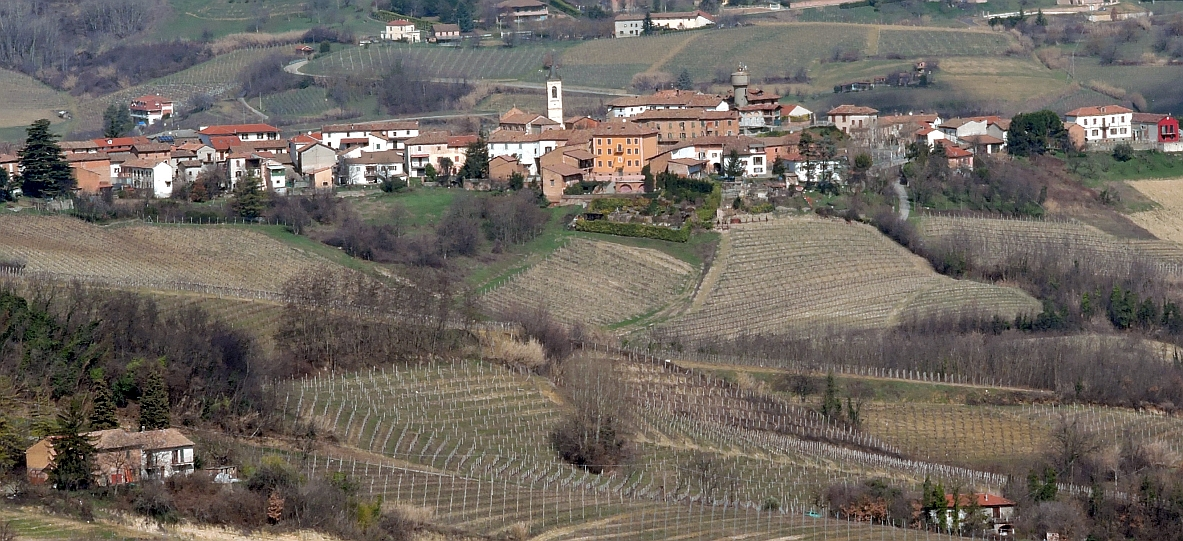

- Coat of arms

- Location within Italy Location within Piedmont
- Coordinates: 44°45′N 8°27′E
- Country: Italy
- Region: Piedmont
- Province: Asti (AT)

Government
  - Mayor: Alessandro Gabutto

Area
  - Total: 3.0 km^{2} (1.2 sq mi)
- Elevation: 273 m (896 ft)

Population (31 July 2010)
  - Total: 203
  - Density: 68/km^{2} (180/sq mi)
- Demonym: Quarantini
- Time zone: UTC+1 (CET)
  - Summer (DST): UTC+2 (CEST)
- Postal code: 14040
- Dialing code: 0141
- Website: Official website

Quaranti is a comune (municipality) in the Province of Asti in the Italian region Piedmont, located about 70 kilometres (43 mi) southeast of Turin and about 25 kilometres (16 mi) southeast of Asti.

Quaranti borders the following municipalities: Alice Bel Colle, Castelletto Molina, Fontanile, Mombaruzzo, and Ricaldone.
