= Sessame =

- Comune
- Comune di Sessame
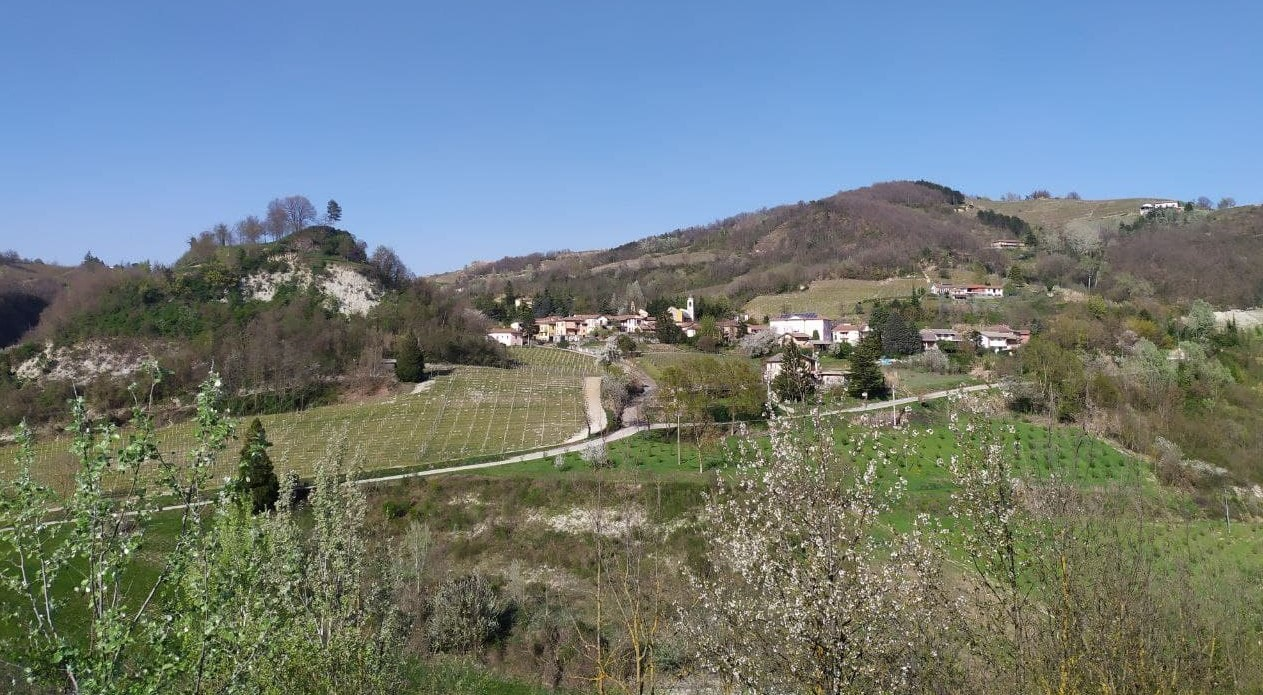

- Coat of arms

- Location within Italy Location within Piedmont
- Coordinates: 44°40′N 8°20′E
- Country: Italy
- Region: Piedmont
- Province: Asti (AT)

Government
  - Mayor: Paolo Carlo Milano

Area
  - Total: 8.45 km^{2} (3.26 sq mi)
- Elevation: 325 m (1,066 ft)

Population (31 December 2019)
  - Total: 251
  - Density: 29.7/km^{2} (76.9/sq mi)
- Demonym: Sessamesi
- Time zone: UTC+1 (CET)
  - Summer (DST): UTC+2 (CEST)
- Postal code: 14050
- Dialing code: 0144
- Website: Official website

Sessame is a comune (municipality) in the Province of Asti in the Italian region Piedmont, located about 70 kilometres (43 mi) southeast of Turin and about 30 kilometres (19 mi) southeast of Asti.

Sessame borders the following municipalities: Bistagno, Cassinasco, Monastero Bormida, Ponti, and Rocchetta Palafea.
