= Castel Rocchero =

- Comune
- Comune di Castel Rocchero
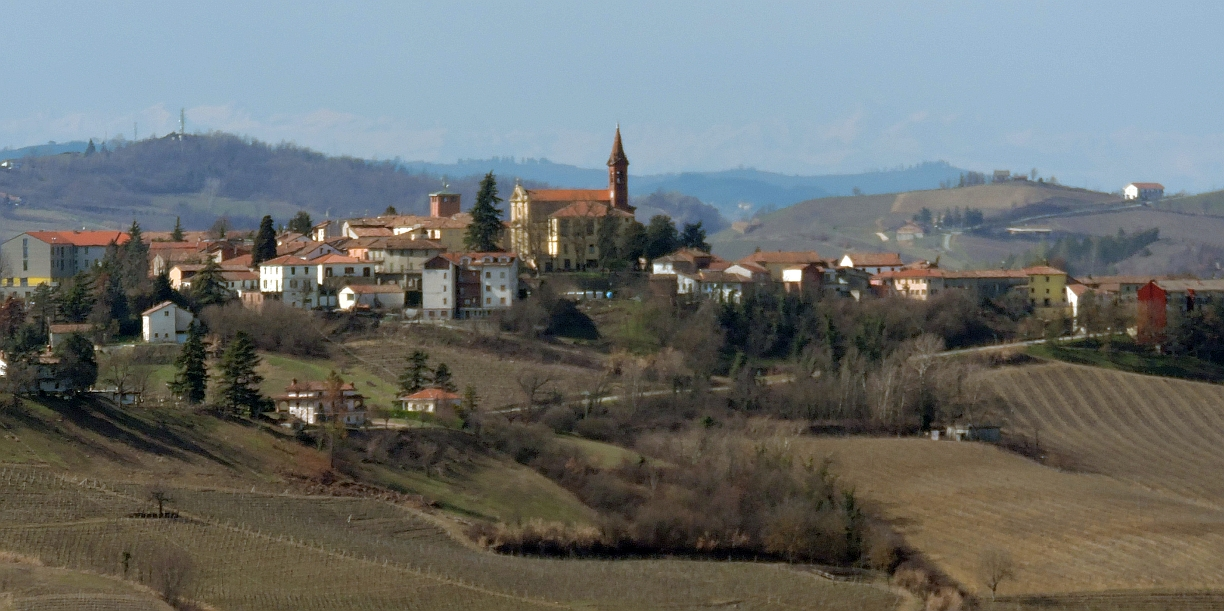
- View of Castel Rocchero

- Coat of arms

- Location within Italy Location within Piedmont
- Coordinates: 44°43′N 8°25′E
- Country: Italy
- Region: Piedmont
- Province: Asti (AT)

Government
  - Mayor: Luigi Iuppa

Area
  - Total: 5.6 km^{2} (2.2 sq mi)
- Elevation: 414 m (1,358 ft)

Population (1 January 2010)
  - Total: 402
  - Density: 72/km^{2} (190/sq mi)
- Demonym: Castelrocchesi
- Time zone: UTC+1 (CET)
  - Summer (DST): UTC+2 (CEST)
- Postal code: 14040
- Dialing code: 0141
- Website: Official website

Castel Rocchero is a comune (municipality) in the Province of Asti in the Italian region Piedmont, located about 70 kilometres (43 mi) southeast of Turin and about 25 kilometres (16 mi) southeast of Asti.

Castel Rocchero borders the following municipalities: Acqui Terme, Alice Bel Colle, Castel Boglione, Castelletto Molina, Fontanile, and Montabone.
