= Montechiaro d'Acqui =

- Comune
- Comune di Montechiaro d'Acqui
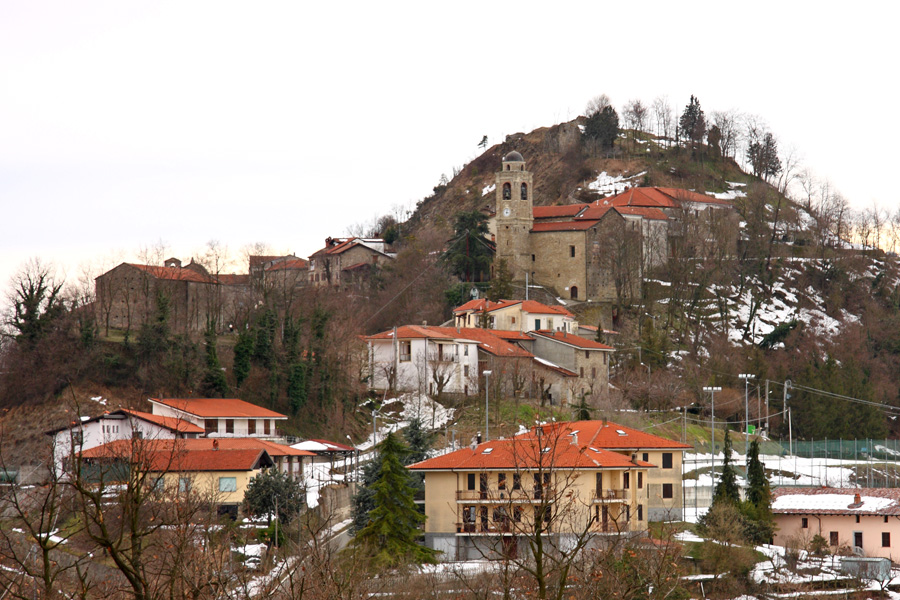
- View of Montechiaro Alto.

- Coat of arms

- Location within Italy Location within Piedmont
- Coordinates: 44°36′N 8°23′E
- Country: Italy
- Region: Piedmont
- Province: Alessandria (AL)
- Frazioni: Montechiaro Piana

Government
  - Mayor: Matteo Monti (Local electoral list)

Area
  - Total: 17.6 km^{2} (6.8 sq mi)
- Elevation: 540 m (1,770 ft)

Population (30 November 2017)
  - Total: 540
  - Density: 31/km^{2} (79/sq mi)
- Demonym: Montechiaresi
- Time zone: UTC+1 (CET)
  - Summer (DST): UTC+2 (CEST)
- Postal code: 15010
- Dialing code: 0144
- Patron saint: Saint George
- Website: Official website

Montechiaro d'Acqui is a comune (municipality) in the Province of Alessandria in the Italian region Piedmont, located about 70 kilometres (43 mi) southeast of Turin and about 40 kilometres (25 mi) southwest of Alessandria.

Montechiaro d'Acqui borders the following municipalities: Cartosio, Castelletto d'Erro, Denice, Malvicino, Mombaldone, Ponti, and Spigno Monferrato.

== History ==
The oldest trace of settlements in the area were found in the surroundings of the Pieve del Cauro (7th century), an old parish church under the influence of the Monastery of Saint Quintino of Spigno Monferrato, now in ruins just outside the hamlet Piana. This church was likely built on an ancient Roman statio placed along the Via Aemilia Scauri.

In the 11-13th centuries, due to the increase of trade along the ridge route between the Po Valley and the Ligurian Sea and the need to provide a better military defence, the current medieval village of Montechiaro Alto (Mons Cauri) was built. In that period, marquis Delfino del Bosco ceded the authority on Montechiaro to the city of Alessandria. However, in 1284 the inhabitants brokered a treaty with marquis Del Carretto.

Then ruled by the Duchy of Milan, after the death of Filippo Maria Visconti (1447) Montechiaro was occupied by the armies of Francesco Sforza. Since 1454 the fief was ceded to the noble families of Del Carretto of Bossolasco and then to Scarampi di Cairo Montenotte. New trades and sales led to the rule of the Marquis of Canelli, the Scarampi-Crivello, the Cavoretti of Belvedere and the Gianazzo of Pamparato, which maintained the feud even after the oath of allegiance to the House of Savoy (1736). Since 18th century, Montechiaro was part of the Kingdom of Sardinia, the Kingdom of Italy and, finally, of the Italian Republic.

Located along a line of transit between the Po Valley and Savona harbour, the village has suffered the passage of armies involved in the Thirty Years' War (Battle of Mombaldone between France-Savoy and Spain, 1637) and the first Campaign of Italy (Campaigns of 1796 in the French Revolutionary Wars) of Napoleon Bonaparte. During World War II, the municipal territory was an area of military activities against German and Italian Social Republic troops by the Italian resistance movement.

Montechiaro has been the adopted homeland and buen ritiro( place of retreat) of some great painters of the 20th century (Eso Peluzzi, Caffassi).

== Transportation ==
The main road of the municipality is the National (now Local) Road n.30 Strada Provinciale 30 di Valle Bormida, passing through the hamlet Piana, in the valley of river Bormida di Spigno.

Montechiaro d'Acqui has a train station on the railroad Alessandria-San Giuseppe di Cairo, located in the hamlet Piana. It is served by local trains connecting villages and towns between Alessandria and Savona.

== Twin towns ==
- Aspremont, France, since 2003
