= Ponzone =

- Comune
- Comune di Ponzone
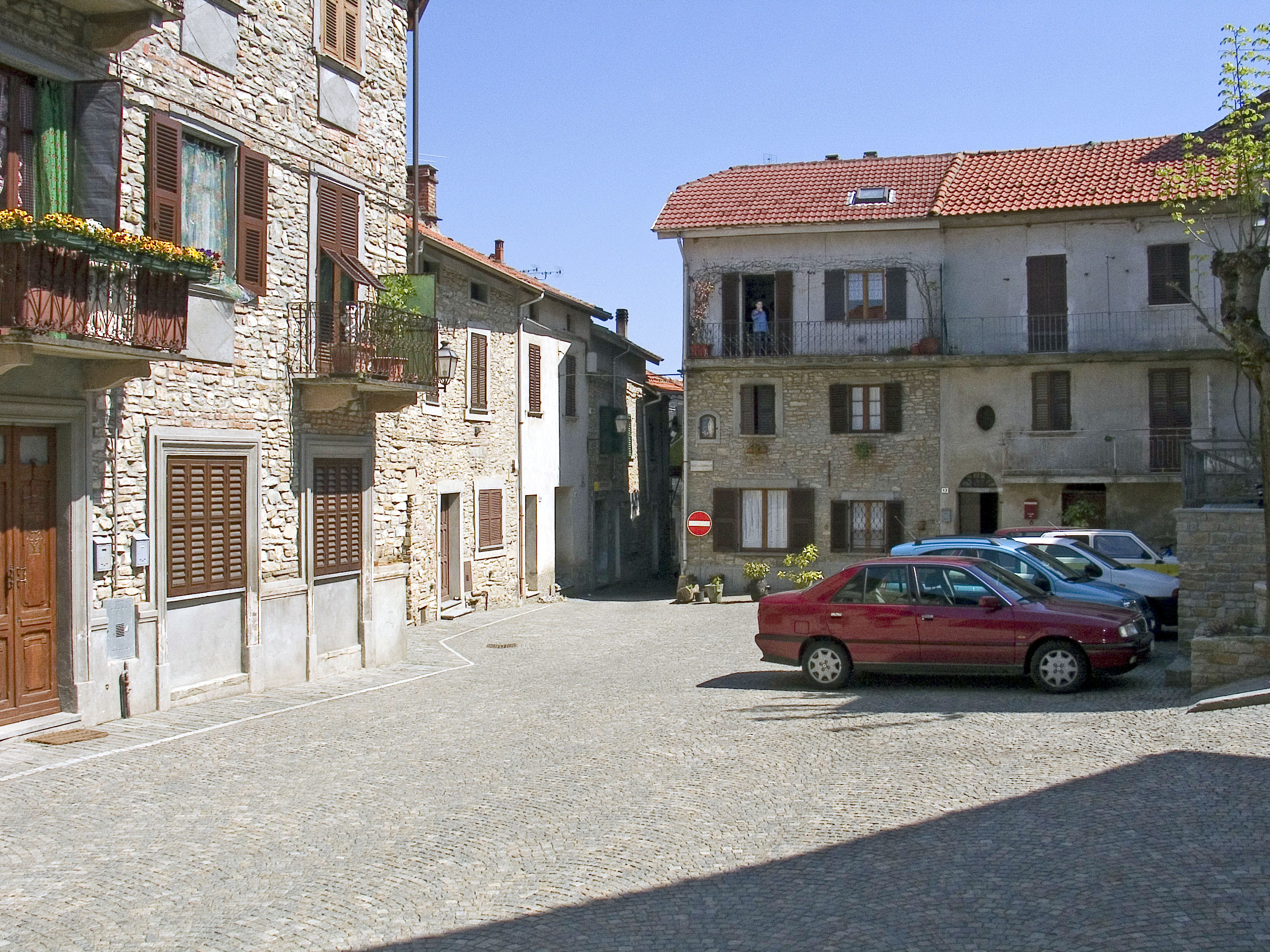
- Piazza Garibaldi

- Location within Italy Location within Piedmont
- Coordinates: 44°35′21″N 8°27′37″E
- Country: Italy
- Region: Piedmont
- Province: Alessandria (AL)
- Frazioni: Ciglione, Caldasio, Pianlago, Cimaferle, La Colla Toleto, Moretti, Piancastagna

Area
  - Total: 69.31 km^{2} (26.76 sq mi)
- Elevation: 629 m (2,064 ft)

Population (2005)
  - Total: 1,218
  - Density: 17.57/km^{2} (45.51/sq mi)
- Demonym: Ponzonesi
- Time zone: UTC+1 (CET)
  - Summer (DST): UTC+2 (CEST)
- Postal code: 15010
- Dialing code: 0144
- Website: Official website

Ponzone is a comune (municipality) in the Province of Alessandria in the Italian region Piedmont, located about 80 kilometres (50 mi) southeast of Turin and about 40 kilometres (25 mi) southwest of Alessandria. As of 31 December 2004, it had a population of 1,217 and an area of 69.3 square kilometres (26.8 mi^{2}).

Ponzone borders the following municipalities: Cartosio, Cassinelle, Cavatore, Grognardo, Malvicino, Molare, Morbello, Pareto, Sassello, Tiglieto, and Urbe.

== Demographic evolution ==
Historical population

Year	Pop.	±%
1861	3,434	—
1871	3,710	+8.0%
1881	3,957	+6.7%
1901	4,348	+9.9%
1911	4,296	−1.2%

Year	Pop.	±%
1921	4,422	+2.9%
1931	3,848	−13.0%
1936	3,428	−10.9%
1951	2,676	−21.9%
1961	1,906	−28.8%

Year	Pop.	±%
1971	1,438	−24.6%
1981	1,279	−11.1%
1991	1,120	−12.4%
2001	1,206	+7.7%

Source: Data from ISTAT
