= Ponti, Piedmont =

Ponti
- Comune
- Comune di Ponti
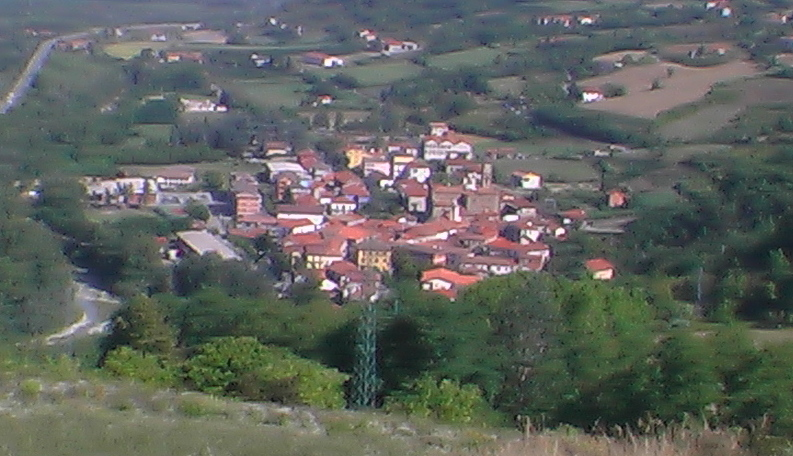

- Coat of arms

- Location within Italy Location within Piedmont
- Coordinates: 44°38′N 8°22′E
- Country: Italy
- Region: Piedmont
- Province: Alessandria (AL)

Government
  - Mayor: Piero Luigi Roso

Area
  - Total: 12.4 km^{2} (4.8 sq mi)
- Elevation: 186 m (610 ft)

Population (31 March 2018)
  - Total: 580
  - Density: 47/km^{2} (120/sq mi)
- Demonym: Pontesi
- Time zone: UTC+1 (CET)
  - Summer (DST): UTC+2 (CEST)
- Postal code: 15010
- Dialing code: 0144
- Patron saint: St. Sebastian
- Saint day: 20 January
- Website: Official website

Ponti is a comune (municipality) in the Province of Alessandria in the Italian region Piedmont, located about 70 kilometres (43 mi) southeast of Turin and about 35 kilometres (22 mi) southwest of Alessandria.

Ponti borders the following municipalities: Bistagno, Castelletto d'Erro, Denice, Monastero Bormida, Montechiaro d'Acqui, and Sessame.
