= Fontanile =

Fontanile Fontanij
- Comune
- Comune di Fontanile
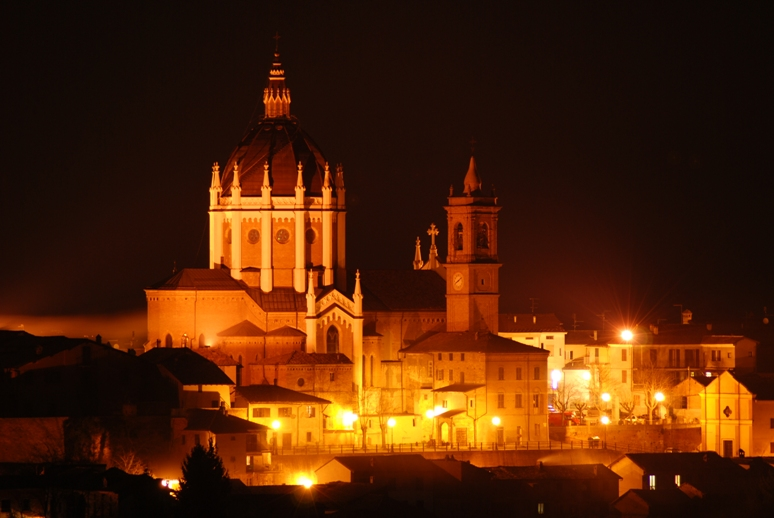
- View of Fontanile

- Location within Italy Location within Piedmont
- Coordinates: 44°45′N 8°25′E
- Country: Italy
- Region: Piedmont
- Province: Province of Asti (AT)
- Frazioni: Borgata Casello, Croci

Government
  - Mayor: Sandra Balbo

Area
  - Total: 8.13 km^{2} (3.14 sq mi)
- Elevation: 276 m (906 ft)

Population (Dec. 2023)
  - Total: 470
  - Density: 58/km^{2} (150/sq mi)
- Demonym: Fontanilesi
- Time zone: UTC+1 (CET)
  - Summer (DST): UTC+2 (CEST)
- Postal code: 14044
- Dialing code: 0141
- Patron saint: John the Baptist
- Saint day: 24th June
- Website: Official website

Fontanile (Piedmontese: Fontanij) is a comune (municipality) in the Province of Asti in the Italian region Piedmont, located about 70 kilometres (43 mi) southeast of Turin and about 25 kilometres (16 mi) southeast of Asti. As of 31 December 2023, it had a population of 470 and an area of 8.0 square kilometres (3.1 mi^{2}).

Fontanile borders the following municipalities: Alice Bel Colle, Castel Boglione, Castel Rocchero, Castelletto Molina, Mombaruzzo, Nizza Monferrato, and Quaranti.

== Demographic evolution ==
Historical population

Year	Pop.	±%
1861	1,144	—
1871	1,166	+1.9%
1881	1,158	−0.7%
1901	1,526	+31.8%
1911	1,489	−2.4%
1921	1,353	−9.1%

Year	Pop.	±%
1931	1,209	−10.6%
1936	1,119	−7.4%
1951	1,086	−2.9%
1961	922	−15.1%
1971	775	−15.9%
1981	601	−22.5%

Year	Pop.	±%
1991	563	−6.3%
2001	542	−3.7%
2011	566	+4.4%
2021	493	−12.9%

Source: Data from ISTAT
