= Ricaldone =

- Comune
- Comune di Ricaldone
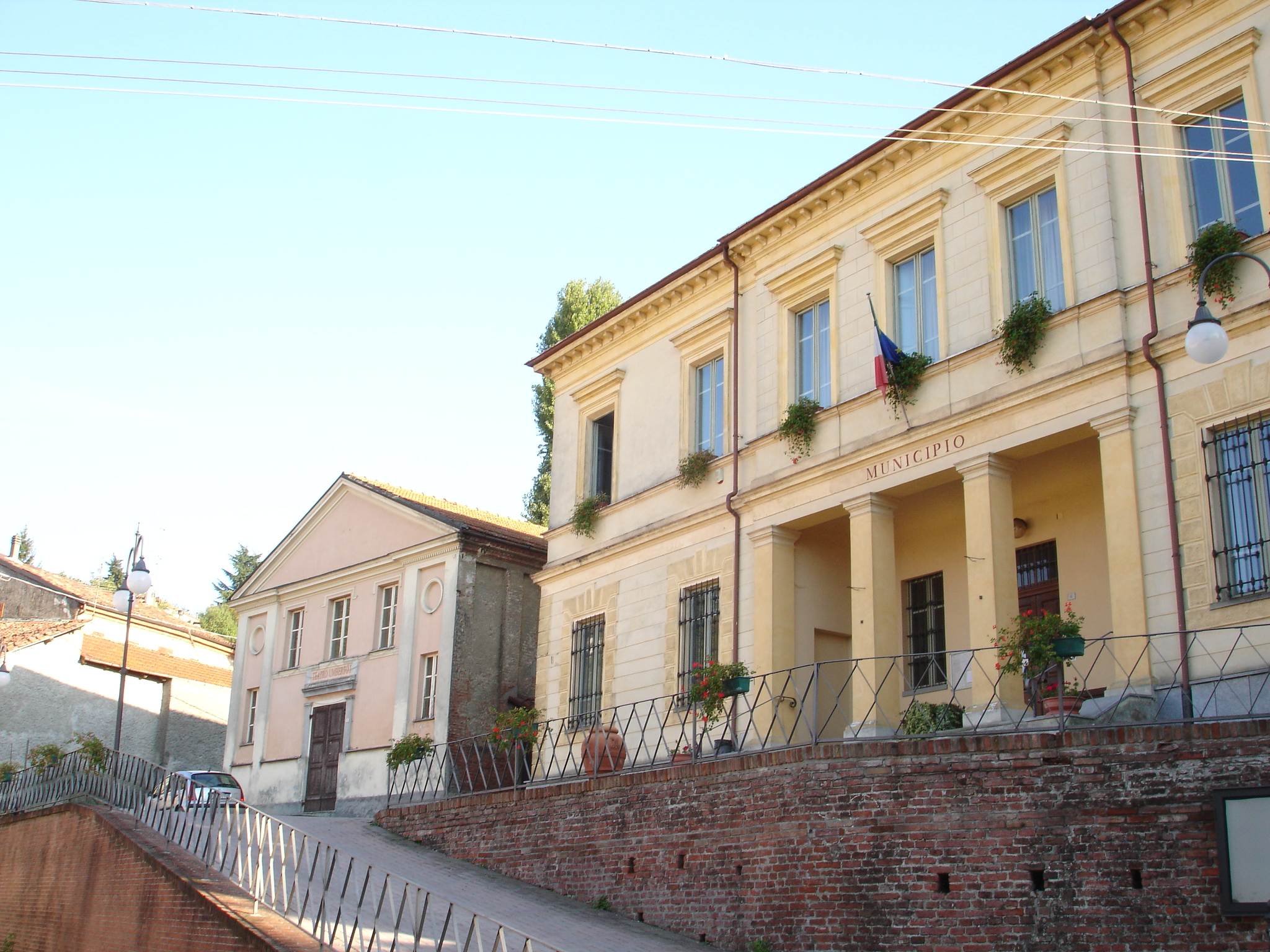
- Town hall

- Location within Italy Location within Piedmont
- Coordinates: 44°44′N 8°28′E
- Country: Italy
- Region: Piedmont
- Province: Province of Alessandria (AL)

Area
  - Total: 10.6 km^{2} (4.1 sq mi)

Population (Dec. 2004)
  - Total: 650
  - Density: 61/km^{2} (160/sq mi)
- Time zone: UTC+1 (CET)
  - Summer (DST): UTC+2 (CEST)
- Postal code: 15010
- Dialing code: 0144

Ricaldone is a comune (municipality) in the Province of Alessandria in the Italian region Piedmont, located about 70 kilometres (43 mi) southeast of Turin and about 25 kilometres (16 mi) southwest of Alessandria. As of 31 December 2004, it had a population of 650 and an area of 10.6 square kilometres (4.1 mi^{2}).

Ricaldone borders the following municipalities: Acqui Terme, Alice Bel Colle, Cassine, Maranzana, Mombaruzzo, Quaranti, and Strevi.

== Demographic evolution ==
Historical population

Year	Pop.	±%
1861	1,183	—
1871	1,332	+12.6%
1881	1,403	+5.3%
1901	1,736	+23.7%
1911	1,622	−6.6%

Year	Pop.	±%
1921	1,561	−3.8%
1931	1,351	−13.5%
1936	1,292	−4.4%
1951	1,042	−19.3%
1961	995	−4.5%

Year	Pop.	±%
1971	850	−14.6%
1981	705	−17.1%
1991	677	−4.0%
2001	687	+1.5%

Source: Data from ISTAT
