= Denice, Piedmont =

Denice
- Comune
- Comune di Denice
- Location within Italy Location within Piedmont
- Coordinates: 44°36′N 8°20′E
- Country: Italy
- Region: Piedmont
- Province: Province of Alessandria (AL)

Area
  - Total: 7.4 km^{2} (2.9 sq mi)

Population (June 2017)
  - Total: 175
  - Density: 24/km^{2} (61/sq mi)
- Time zone: UTC+1 (CET)
  - Summer (DST): UTC+2 (CEST)
- Postal code: 15010
- Dialing code: 0144

Denice is a comune (municipality) in the Province of Alessandria in the Italian region Piedmont, located about 70 kilometres (43 mi) southeast of Turin and about 40 kilometres (25 mi) southwest of Alessandria. As of 30 June 2017, it had a population of 175 and an area of 7.4 square kilometres (2.9 mi^{2}).

Denice borders the following municipalities: Mombaldone, Monastero Bormida, Montechiaro d'Acqui, Ponti, and Roccaverano.

== Demographic evolution ==
Historical population

Year	Pop.	±%
1861	585	—
1871	534	−8.7%
1881	523	−2.1%
1901	634	+21.2%
1911	608	−4.1%

Year	Pop.	±%
1921	668	+9.9%
1931	668	+0.0%
1936	625	−6.4%
1951	506	−19.0%
1961	386	−23.7%

Year	Pop.	±%
1971	332	−14.0%
1981	272	−18.1%
1991	243	−10.7%
2001	204	−16.0%

Source: Data from ISTAT
