= Rocchetta Palafea =

- Comune
- Comune di Rocchetta Palafea
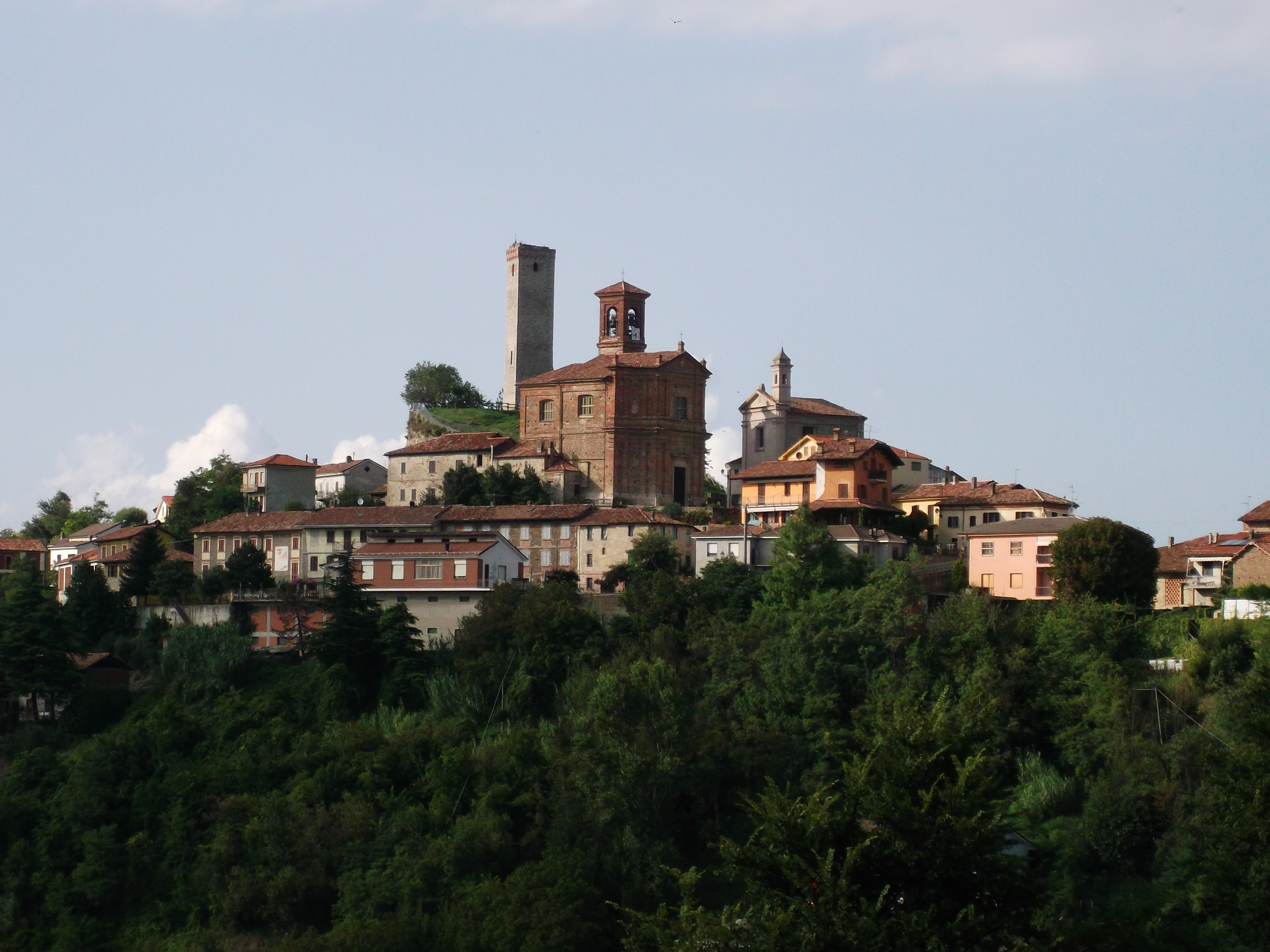

- Coat of arms

- Location within Italy Location within Piedmont
- Coordinates: 44°42′N 8°21′E
- Country: Italy
- Region: Piedmont
- Province: Asti (AT)
  - Mayor: (Giuseppe Gallo)

Area
  - Total: 7.8 km^{2} (3.0 sq mi)
- Elevation: 359 m (1,178 ft)

Population (31 December 2010)
  - Total: 423
  - Density: 54/km^{2} (140/sq mi)
- Demonym: Rocchettesi
- Time zone: UTC+1 (CET)
  - Summer (DST): UTC+2 (CEST)
- Postal code: 14042
- Dialing code: 0141
- Patron saint: St. Evasius
- Saint day: 1 December
- Website: Official website

Rocchetta Palafea is a comune (municipality) in the Province of Asti in the Italian region Piedmont, located about 70 kilometres (43 mi) southeast of Turin and about 25 kilometres (16 mi) southeast of Asti.

Rocchetta Palafea borders the following municipalities: Bistagno, Calamandrana, Cassinasco, Castel Boglione, Montabone, and Sessame.
