= Castel Boglione =

- Comune
- Comune di Castel Boglione
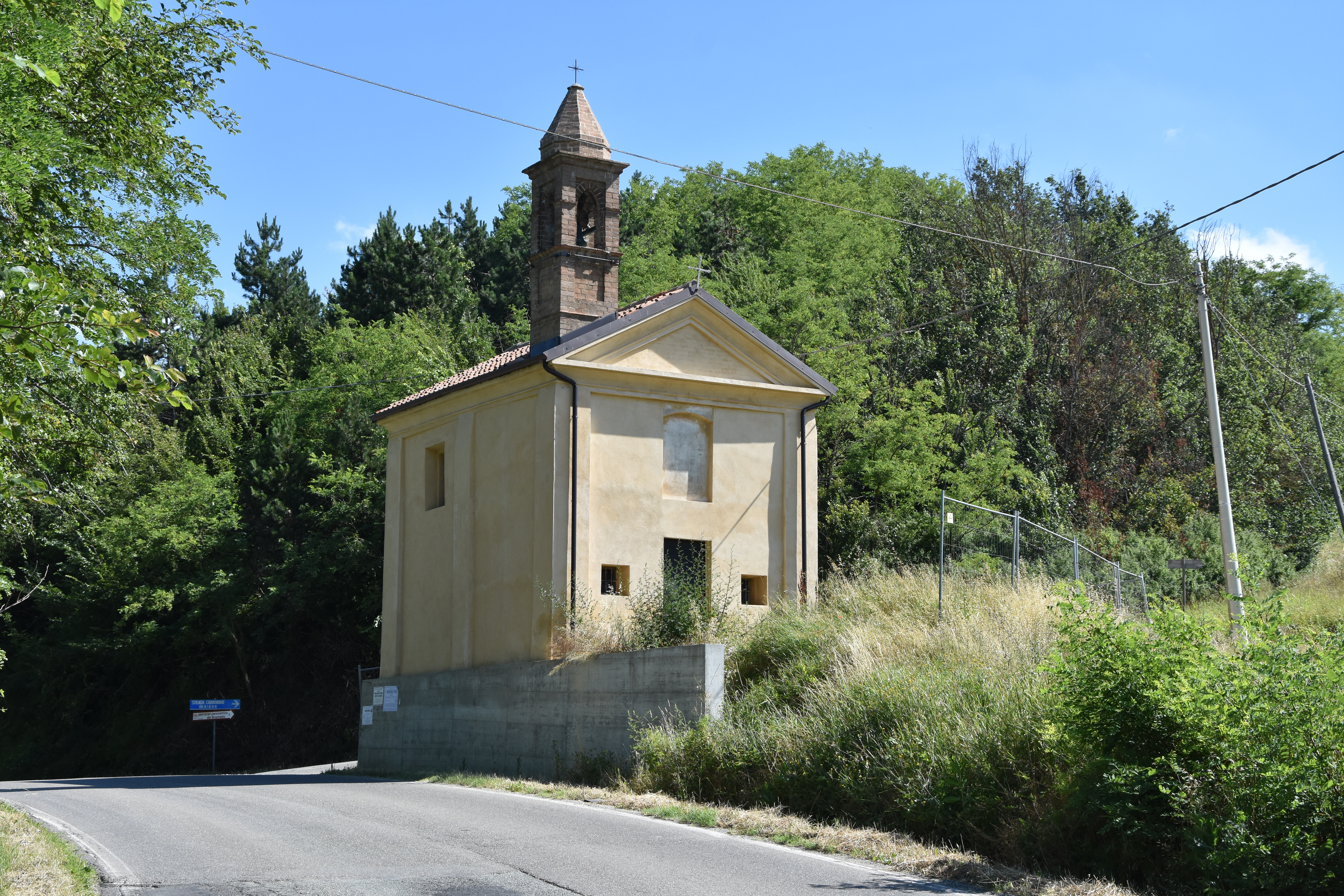

- Coat of arms

- Location within Italy Location within Piedmont
- Coordinates: 44°43′N 8°23′E
- Country: Italy
- Region: Piedmont
- Province: Asti (AT)

Government
  - Mayor: Gianfranco Bossi

Area
  - Total: 12.0 km^{2} (4.6 sq mi)
- Elevation: 260 m (850 ft)

Population (1 January 2010)
  - Total: 632
  - Density: 52.7/km^{2} (136/sq mi)
- Demonym: Castelboglionesi
- Time zone: UTC+1 (CET)
  - Summer (DST): UTC+2 (CEST)
- Postal code: 14040
- Dialing code: 0141
- Website: Official website

Castel Boglione is a comune (municipality) in the Province of Asti in the Italian region Piedmont, located about 70 kilometres (43 mi) southeast of Turin and about 25 kilometres (16 mi) southeast of Asti.

Castel Boglione borders the following municipalities: Calamandrana, Castel Rocchero, Fontanile, Montabone, Nizza Monferrato, and Rocchetta Palafea.
