= Alice Bel Colle =

- Comune
- Comune di Alice Bel Colle
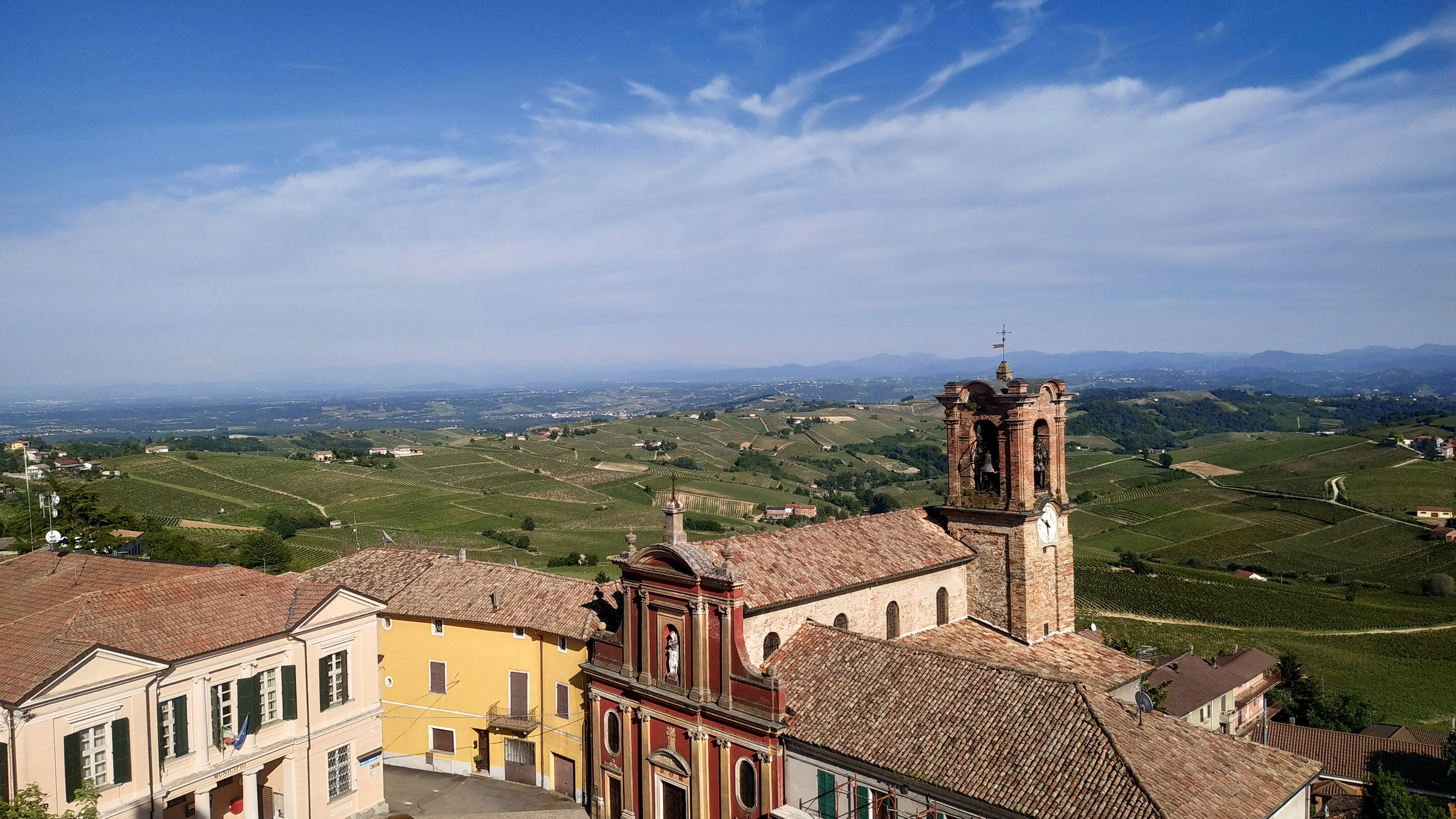
- View from the "Belvedere"

- Location of Alice Bel Colle in Italy Alice Bel Colle (Piedmont)
- Coordinates: 44°43′N 8°27′E
- Country: Italy
- Region: Piedmont
- Province: Alessandria (AL)

Government
  - Mayor: Franco Garrone

Area
  - Total: 12.1 km^{2} (4.7 sq mi)
- Elevation: 418 m (1,371 ft)

Population (2005)
  - Total: 780
  - Density: 64/km^{2} (170/sq mi)
- Demonym: Alicesi
- Time zone: UTC+1 (CET)
  - Summer (DST): UTC+2 (CEST)
- Postal code: 15010
- Dialing code: 0144
- Website: Official website

Alice Bel Colle is a comune (municipality) in the Province of Alessandria in the Italian region Piedmont, located about 70 kilometres (43 mi) southeast of Turin and about 25 kilometres (16 mi) southwest of Alessandria.

Alice Bel Colle borders the following municipalities: Acqui Terme, Cassine, Castel Rocchero, Castelletto Molina, Fontanile, Maranzana, Quaranti, and Ricaldone. The economy is mostly based on agriculture, including production of wine. It was a possession of the Marquisses of Montferrat until 1533.

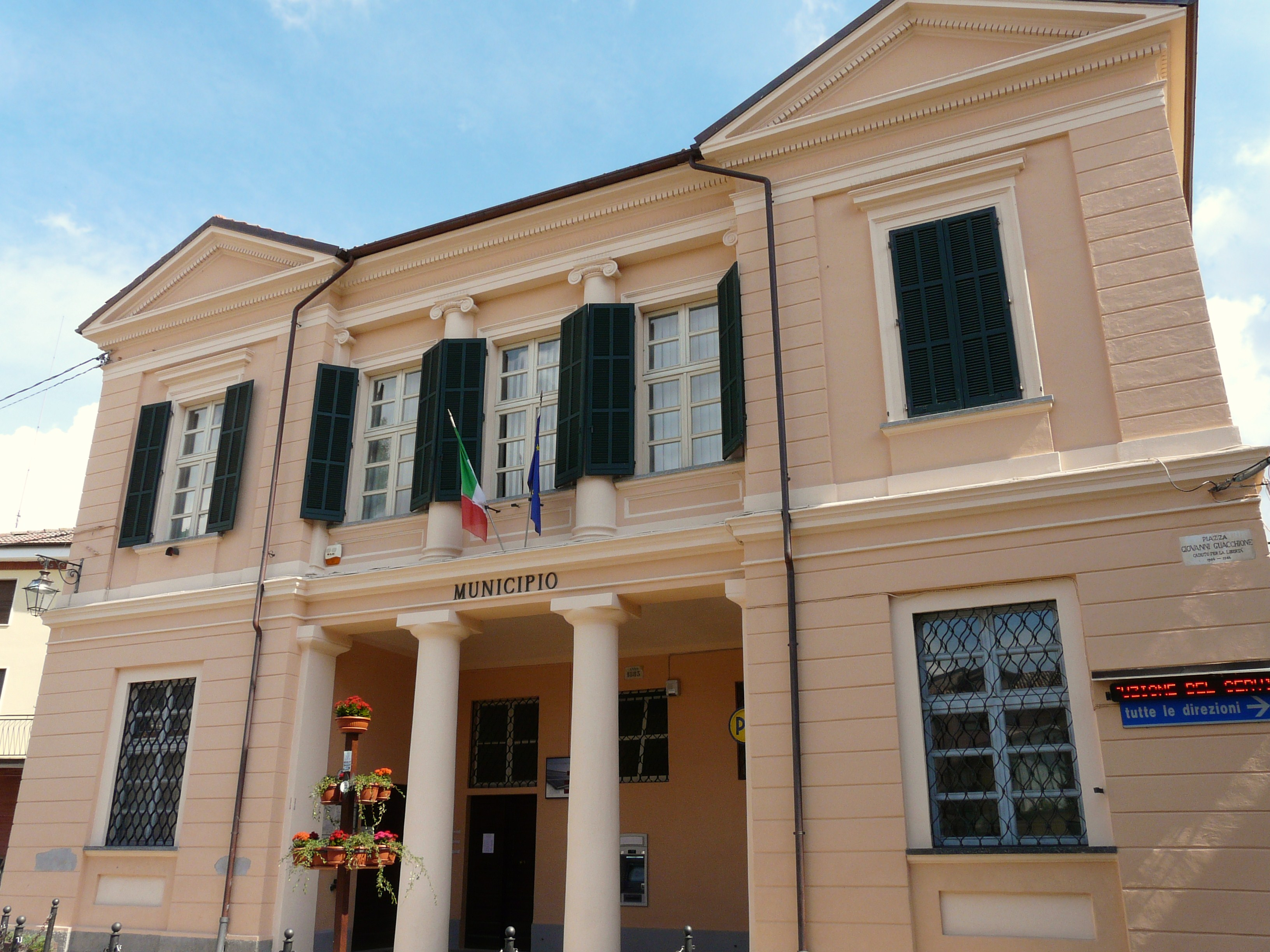
Town Hall
