= Maranzana =

- Comune
- Comune di Maranzana
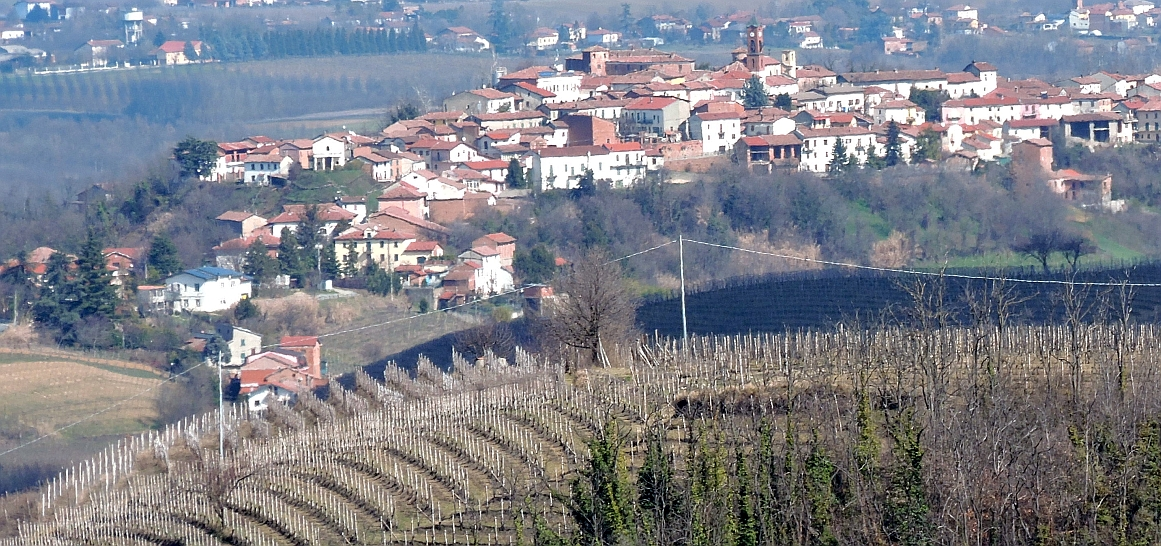
- View of Maranzana

- Coat of arms

- Location within Italy Location within Piedmont
- Coordinates: 44°46′N 8°29′E
- Country: Italy
- Region: Piedmont
- Province: Province of Asti (AT)

Area
  - Total: 4.5 km^{2} (1.7 sq mi)

Population (Dec. 2004)
  - Total: 317
  - Density: 70/km^{2} (180/sq mi)
- Demonym: Maranzanesi
- Time zone: UTC+1 (CET)
  - Summer (DST): UTC+2 (CEST)
- Postal code: 14040
- Dialing code: 0141
- Website: Official website

Maranzana is a comune (municipality) in the Province of Asti in the Italian region Piedmont, located about 70 kilometres (43 mi) southeast of Turin and about 25 kilometres (16 mi) southeast of Asti. As of 31 December 2004, it had a population of 317 and an area of 4.5 square kilometres (1.7 mi^{2}).

Maranzana borders the following municipalities: Alice Bel Colle, Cassine, Mombaruzzo, and Ricaldone.

Maranzana is the birthplace of the explorer Giacomo Bove.

== Demographic evolution ==
Historical population

Year	Pop.	±%
1861	726	—
1871	805	+10.9%
1881	895	+11.2%
1901	1,162	+29.8%
1911	1,244	+7.1%

Year	Pop.	±%
1921	1,158	−6.9%
1931	1,043	−9.9%
1936	985	−5.6%
1951	867	−12.0%
1961	636	−26.6%

Year	Pop.	±%
1971	515	−19.0%
1981	418	−18.8%
1991	335	−19.9%
2001	307	−8.4%

Source: Data from ISTAT
