= Castelletto Molina =

- Comune
- Comune di Castelletto Molina
- Coat of arms

- Location within Italy Location within Piedmont
- Coordinates: 44°45′N 8°25′E
- Country: Italy
- Region: Piedmont
- Province: Asti (AT)

Government
  - Mayor: Massimiliano Antonio Caruso

Area
  - Total: 3.0 km^{2} (1.2 sq mi)
- Elevation: 227 m (745 ft)

Population (1 January 2010)
  - Total: 184
  - Density: 61/km^{2} (160/sq mi)
- Demonym: Castellettesi
- Time zone: UTC+1 (CET)
  - Summer (DST): UTC+2 (CEST)
- Postal code: 14040
- Dialing code: 0141
- Website: Official website

Castelletto Molina is a comune (municipality) in the Province of Asti in the Italian region Piedmont, located about 70 kilometres (43 mi) southeast of Turin and about 25 kilometres (16 mi) southeast of Asti.

Castelletto Molina borders the following municipalities: Alice Bel Colle, Castel Rocchero, Fontanile, and Quaranti.

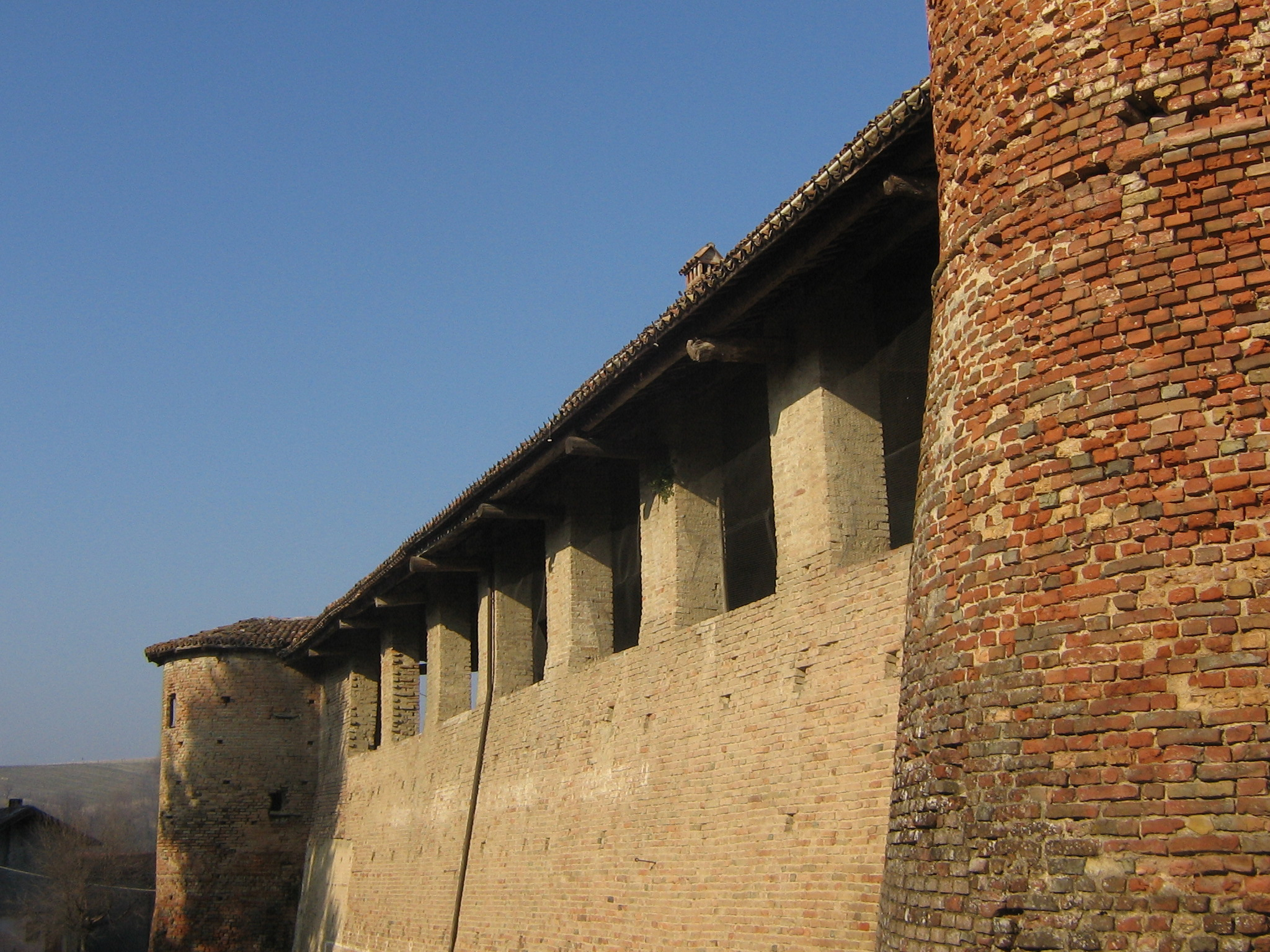
View of the castle.
