= Cartosio =

- Comune
- Comune di Cartosio
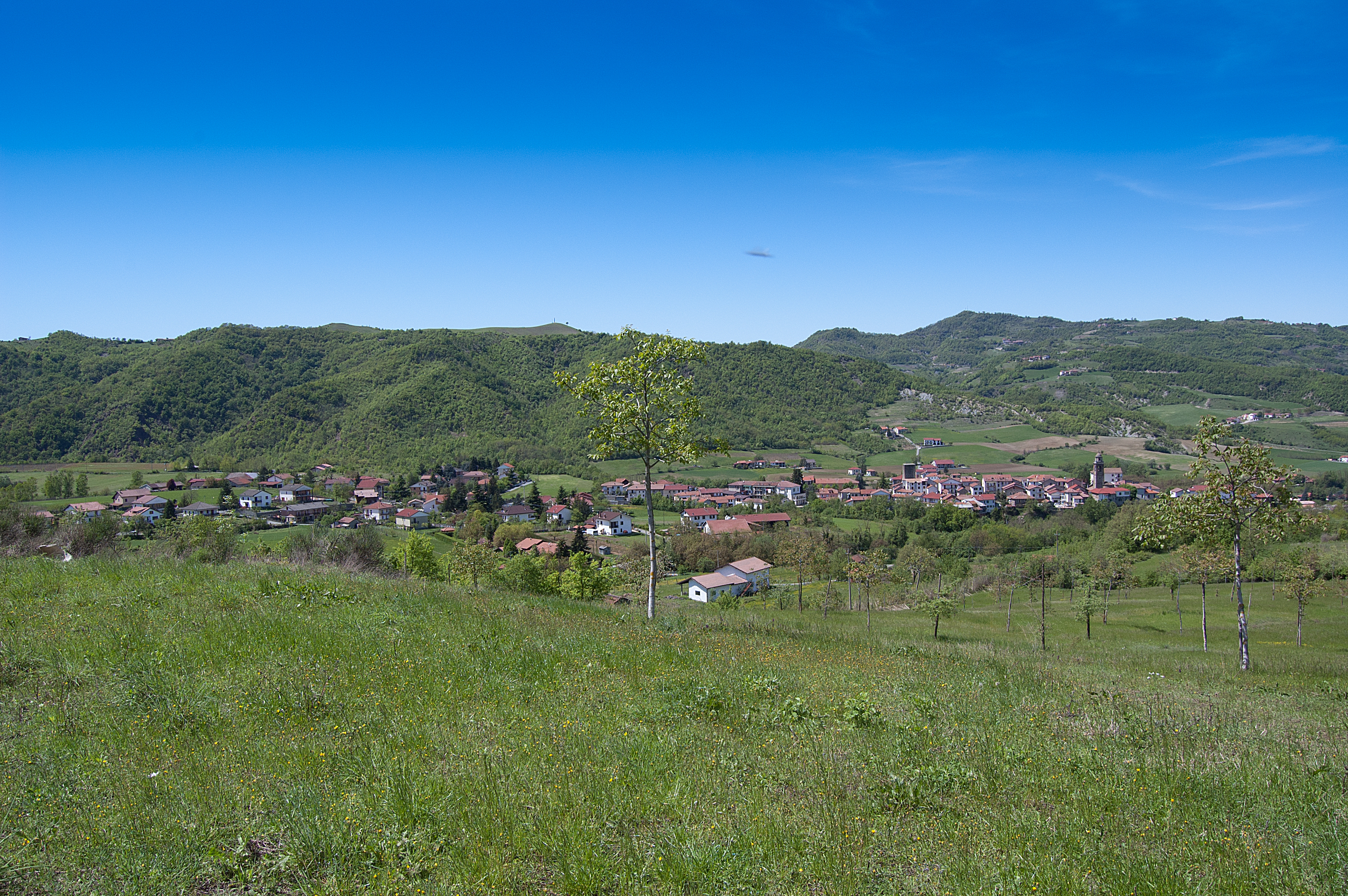

- Coat of arms

- Location within Italy Location within Piedmont
- Coordinates: 44°36′N 8°25′E
- Country: Italy
- Region: Piedmont
- Province: Alessandria (AL)

Government
  - Mayor: Mario Morena

Area
  - Total: 16.7 km^{2} (6.4 sq mi)
- Elevation: 230 m (750 ft)

Population (30 November 2019)
  - Total: 734
  - Density: 44.0/km^{2} (114/sq mi)
- Demonym: Cartosiani
- Time zone: UTC+1 (CET)
  - Summer (DST): UTC+2 (CEST)
- Postal code: 15015
- Dialing code: 0144
- Website: Official website

Cartosio is a comune (municipality) in the Province of Alessandria in the Italian region Piedmont, located about 80 kilometres (50 mi) southeast of Turin and about 40 kilometres (25 mi) southwest of Alessandria.

Cartosio borders the following municipalities: Castelletto d'Erro, Cavatore, Malvicino, Melazzo, Montechiaro d'Acqui, Pareto, and Ponzone.
