= Castelletto d'Erro =

- Comune
- Comune di Castelletto d'Erro
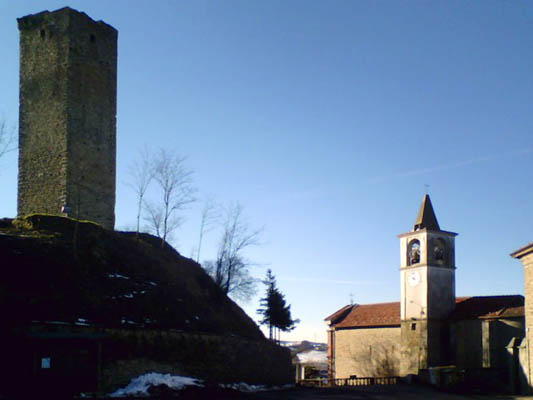

- Coat of arms

- Location within Italy Location within Piedmont
- Coordinates: 44°38′N 8°24′E
- Country: Italy
- Region: Piedmont
- Province: Alessandria (AL)

Government
  - Mayor: Giuseppe Panaro

Area
  - Total: 4.7 km^{2} (1.8 sq mi)
- Elevation: 544 m (1,785 ft)

Population (3 June 2017)
  - Total: 155
  - Density: 33/km^{2} (85/sq mi)
- Demonym: Castellettesi
- Time zone: UTC+1 (CET)
  - Summer (DST): UTC+2 (CEST)
- Postal code: 15010
- Dialing code: 0144
- Patron saint: St. Anne
- Saint day: 26 June

Castelletto d'Erro is a comune (municipality) in the Province of Alessandria in the Italian region Piedmont, located about 70 kilometres (43 mi) southeast of Turin and about 35 kilometres (22 mi) southwest of Alessandria.

Castelletto d'Erro borders the following municipalities: Bistagno, Cartosio, Melazzo, Montechiaro d'Acqui, and Ponti.
