= Bormida di Spigno =

River in Italy

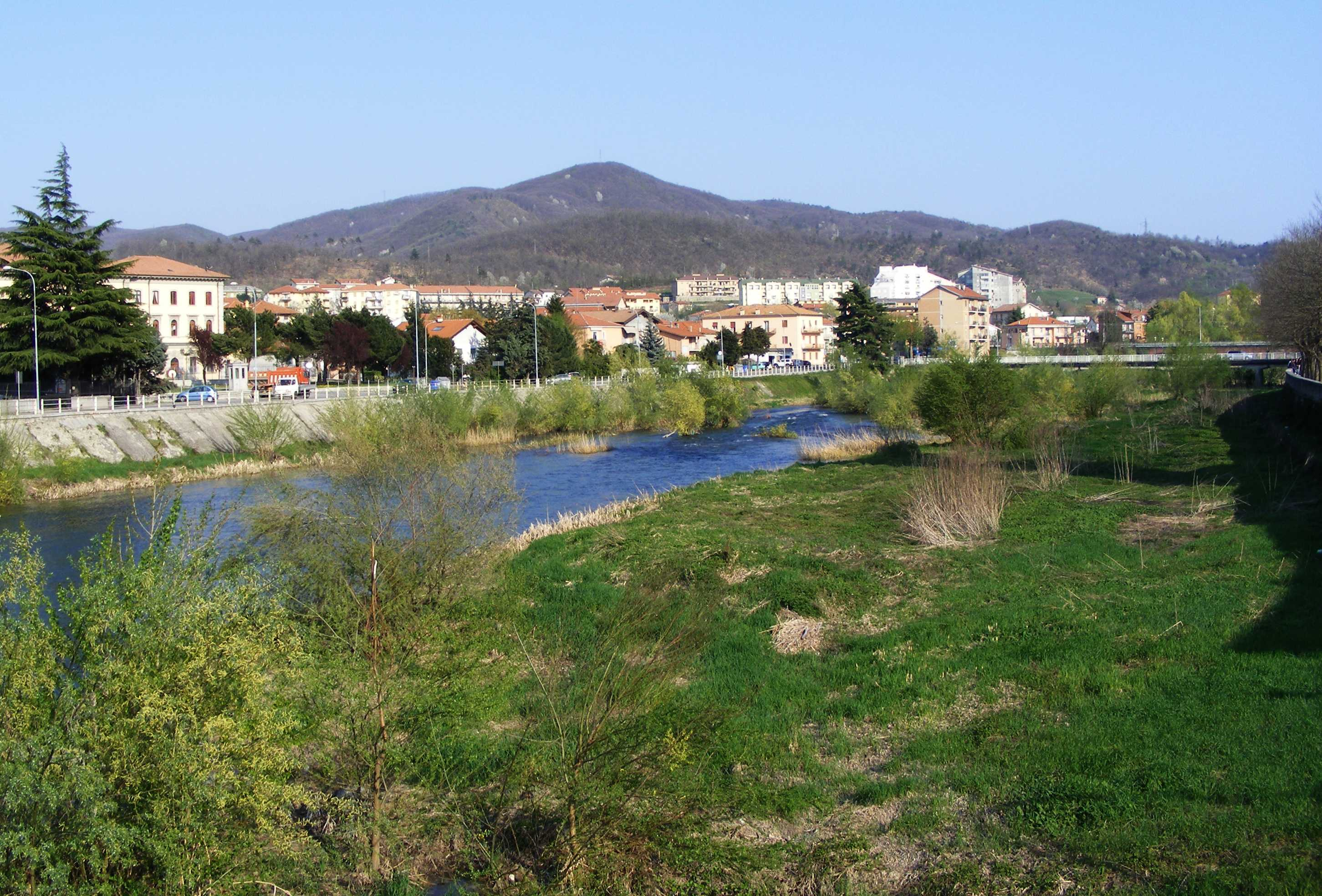
- The river in Cairo Montenotte

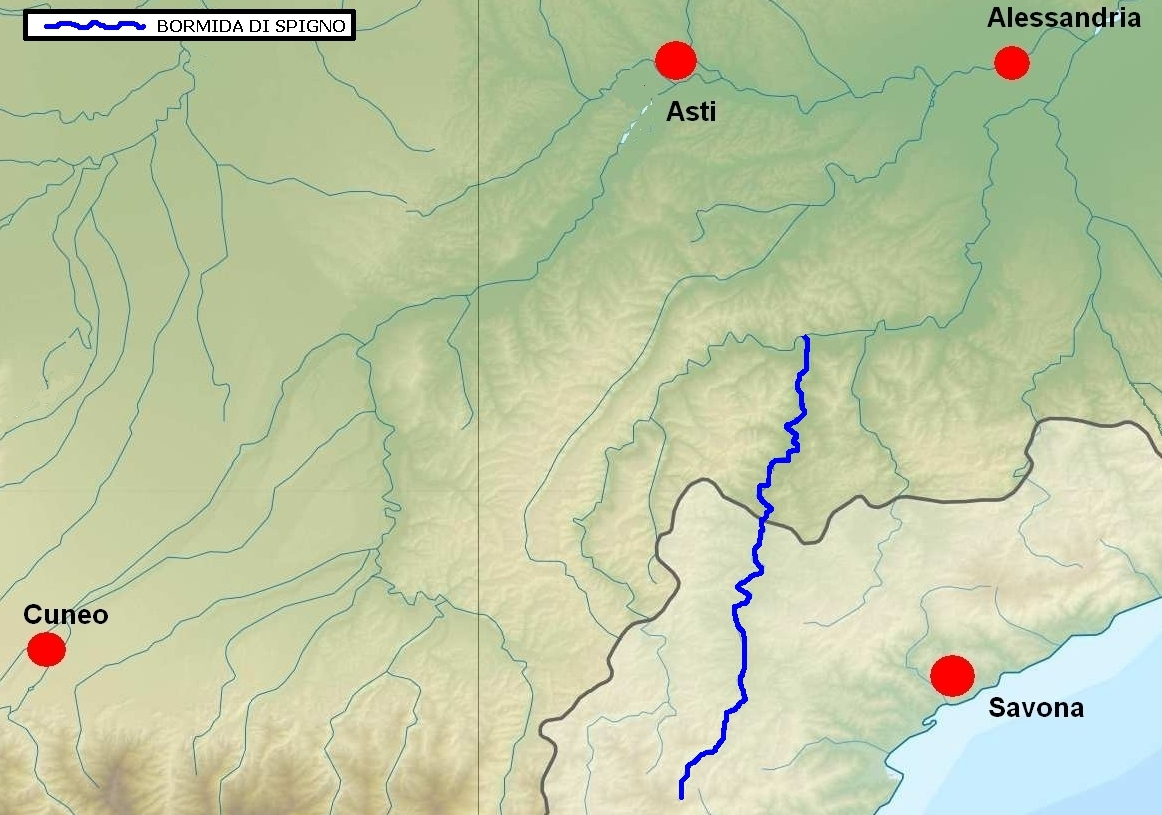

Location
- Country: Italy

Physical characteristics
- Source
  - location: Pian dei Corsi, Liguria
  - elevation: 1,000 m (3,300 ft)
- Mouth
  - location: Bormida, near Bistagno (AL)
  - coordinates: 44.6575°N 8.3528°E
- Length: 58.2 km (36.2 mi)
- Basin size: 273.7 km^{2} (105.7 mi^{2})
- Discharge
  - average: 6.7 m^{3}/s (240 cu ft/s)

Basin features
- Progression: Bormida

The Bormida di Spigno is a river of north-west Italy.

== Geography ==
The headwaters of the Bormida di Spigno are in the Ligurian province of Savona above Pian dei Corsi at 1,000 metres (3,300 ft) above sea level in a transitional zone between the Alpine and Apennine mountain ranges. There its waters run as the separate “Bormidas” of Mallare and Pallare in distinct close valleys before quickly joining after a few kilometers. It joins with the Bormida (or Bormida di Millesimo) near Bistagno in the Piedmontese province of Alessandria.
