= Melazzo =

- Comune
- Comune di Melazzo
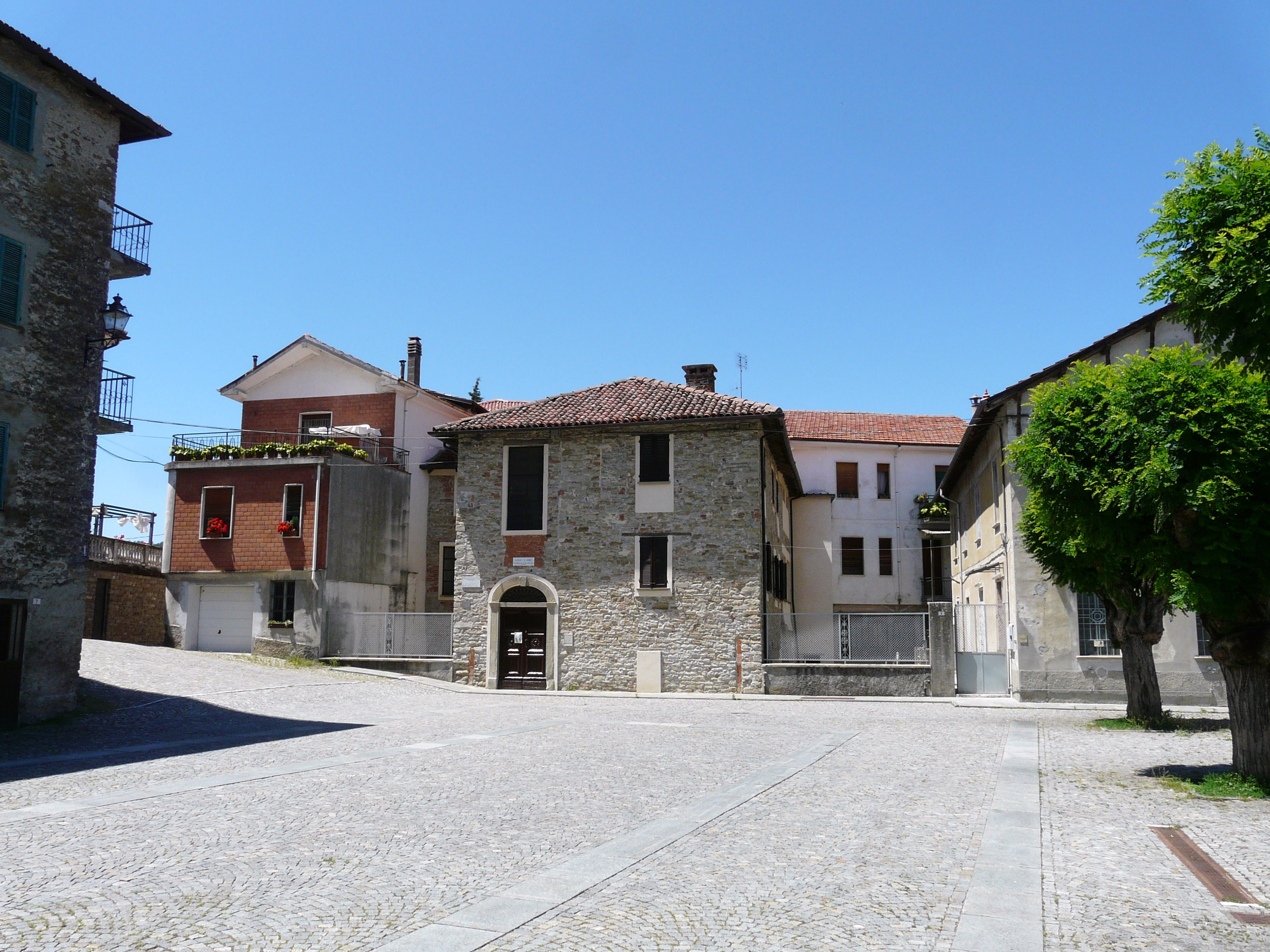

- Location within Italy Location within Piedmont
- Coordinates: 44°38′N 8°25′E
- Country: Italy
- Region: Piedmont
- Province: Province of Alessandria (AL)

Area
  - Total: 19.7 km^{2} (7.6 sq mi)
- Elevation: 254 m (833 ft)

Population (Dec. 2004)
  - Total: 1,241
  - Density: 63.0/km^{2} (163/sq mi)
- Demonym: Melazzesi
- Time zone: UTC+1 (CET)
  - Summer (DST): UTC+2 (CEST)
- Postal code: 15010
- Dialing code: 0144

Melazzo is a comune (municipality) in the Province of Alessandria in the Italian region Piedmont, located about 70 kilometres (43 mi) southeast of Turin and about 35 kilometres (22 mi) southwest of Alessandria. As of 31 December 2004, it had a population of 1,241 and an area of 19.7 square kilometres (7.6 mi^{2}).

Melazzo borders the following municipalities: Acqui Terme, Bistagno, Cartosio, Castelletto d'Erro, Cavatore, and Terzo.

== Notable Melazzesi ==
- Saint Guido of Acqui (c.1004–1070), born in Melazzo to the family of the Counts of Acquesana, became Bishop of Asti.

== Demographic evolution ==
Historical population

Year	Pop.	±%
1861	1,925	—
1871	2,094	+8.8%
1881	2,081	−0.6%
1901	2,413	+16.0%
1911	2,545	+5.5%

Year	Pop.	±%
1921	2,579	+1.3%
1931	2,373	−8.0%
1936	2,301	−3.0%
1951	1,888	−17.9%
1961	1,513	−19.9%

Year	Pop.	±%
1971	1,301	−14.0%
1981	1,160	−10.8%
1991	1,100	−5.2%
2001	1,185	+7.7%

Source: Data from ISTAT
