= Pareto, Piedmont =

Municipality in Piedmont, Italy

Pareto
- Comune
- Comune di Pareto
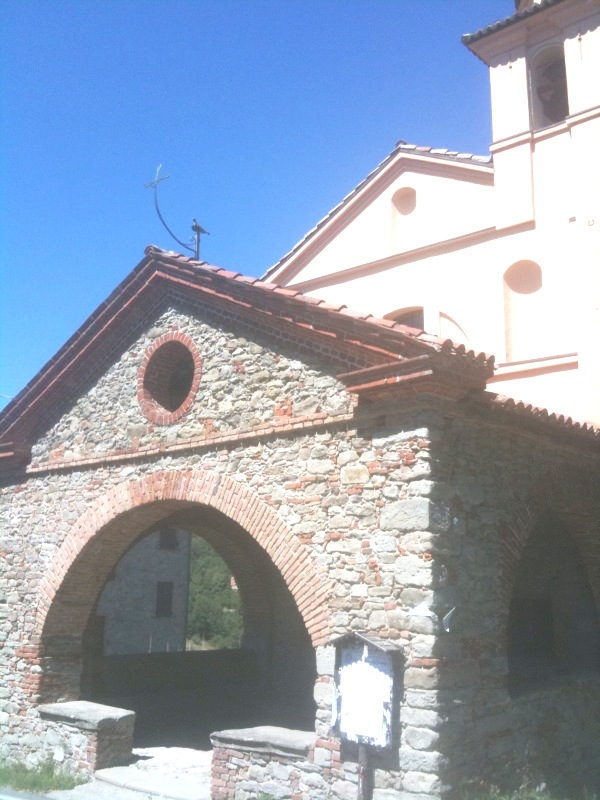

- Location within Italy Location within Piedmont
- Coordinates: 44°31′N 8°23′E
- Country: Italy
- Region: Piedmont
- Province: Alessandria (AL)

Government
  - Mayor: Walter Borreani

Area
  - Total: 41.74 km^{2} (16.12 sq mi)
- Elevation: 476 m (1,562 ft)

Population (31 December 2017)
  - Total: 531
  - Density: 12.7/km^{2} (32.9/sq mi)
- Demonym: Paretesi
- Time zone: UTC+1 (CET)
  - Summer (DST): UTC+2 (CEST)
- Postal code: 15010
- Dialing code: 019

Pareto is a comune (municipality) in the Province of Alessandria in the Italian region Piedmont, located about 80 kilometres (50 mi) southeast of Turin and about 50 kilometres (31 mi) southwest of Alessandria.

Pareto borders the following municipalities: Cartosio, Giusvalla, Malvicino, Mioglia, Ponzone, Sassello, and Spigno Monferrato.

The village is located on a steep hill, almost 500 meters above sea level.

The name of the village has been mistakenly interpreted according to a paretimology that connects it with Latin piretus, 'pear (tree) orchard'. This is evidently a paretymology, deriving, instead, the toponym from the Indo-European root *br- / *bar-, with the meaning of 'rock', 'stone', 'hill', 'mountain', 'slope', = Latin pǎrǐēs, 'mountain face', 'rock wall'. The toponym would have originated in Indo-European times (Par-eto ~ Par- < PIE *br- / *bar-, 'stone', 'hill', 'mountain', 'slope', + -eto [< Latin -etum, 'village'] = *breto / *bar-eto → *par-eto = Pareto, 'village located on a hill').

== Twin towns ==
Pareto di Borbera is twinned with:

- Cauto Cristo, Cuba
