= Simeto-class water tanker =

Class overview
- Name: Simeto
- Builders: - Cantiere Navale De Poli (Pellestrina, Venezia): Ticino and Tirso; - C.I.N.E.T. (Molfetta, Bari): Simeto
- Operators: 2 x Italian Navy; 1 x Tunisian National Navy
- Completed: 3
- Active: 3

General characteristics
- Type: Auxiliary ship
- Displacement: Ticino and Tirso: - 715 t (704 long tons), empty; - 2.027 t (1.995 long tons), full load; Simeto: - 1.914 t (1.884 long tons), full load
- Length: Ticino and Tirso: 69.84 m (229 ft 2 in) oa; Simeto: 68.35 m (224 ft 3 in) oa
- Beam: 10.00 m (32 ft 10 in)
- Draught: 3.90 m (12 ft 10 in)
- Propulsion: - 1 x shaft; - 2 x diesel engines Grandi Motori Trieste GMT 230.6-BL, 1.940 kW (2.602 bhp); - 3 x diesel engines generators AIFO 8281; - 1 x diesel engine generator AIFO 8361; - 1 x bow thruster
- Speed: 13 knots (24 km/h; 15 mph)
- Range: 4,000 nmi (7,400 km; 4,600 mi) at 4 knots (7.4 km/h; 4.6 mph)
- Crew: 29
- Sensors & processing systems: 2 x GEM Elettronica navigation radar AN/SPN-748
- Notes: ship tanker, for 1.200 t (1.181 long tons) of water

The Simeto class is a class of three auxiliary ships built for the Italian Navy for emergency water replenishment of islands. One ship of the class, the Simeto, was transferred to the Tunisian Navy in 2003.

== Ships ==
Italian Navy – Simeto class
Name	Pennant number	Hull number	Laid down	Launched	Commissioned	Decommissioned	Motto	Notes
Simeto	A 5375	3–86		4 April 1988	9 July 1988	30 June 2003		delivered 10 July 2003 to Tunisian National Navy as Aïn Zaghouan
Ticino	A 5376	149	June 1991	12 March 1994	10 June 1994		In aqua salus	
Tirso	A 5377	150	June 1991	29 September 1992	12 March 1994		Per undas aquam gestum	
