= Bormida (river) =

Italian river

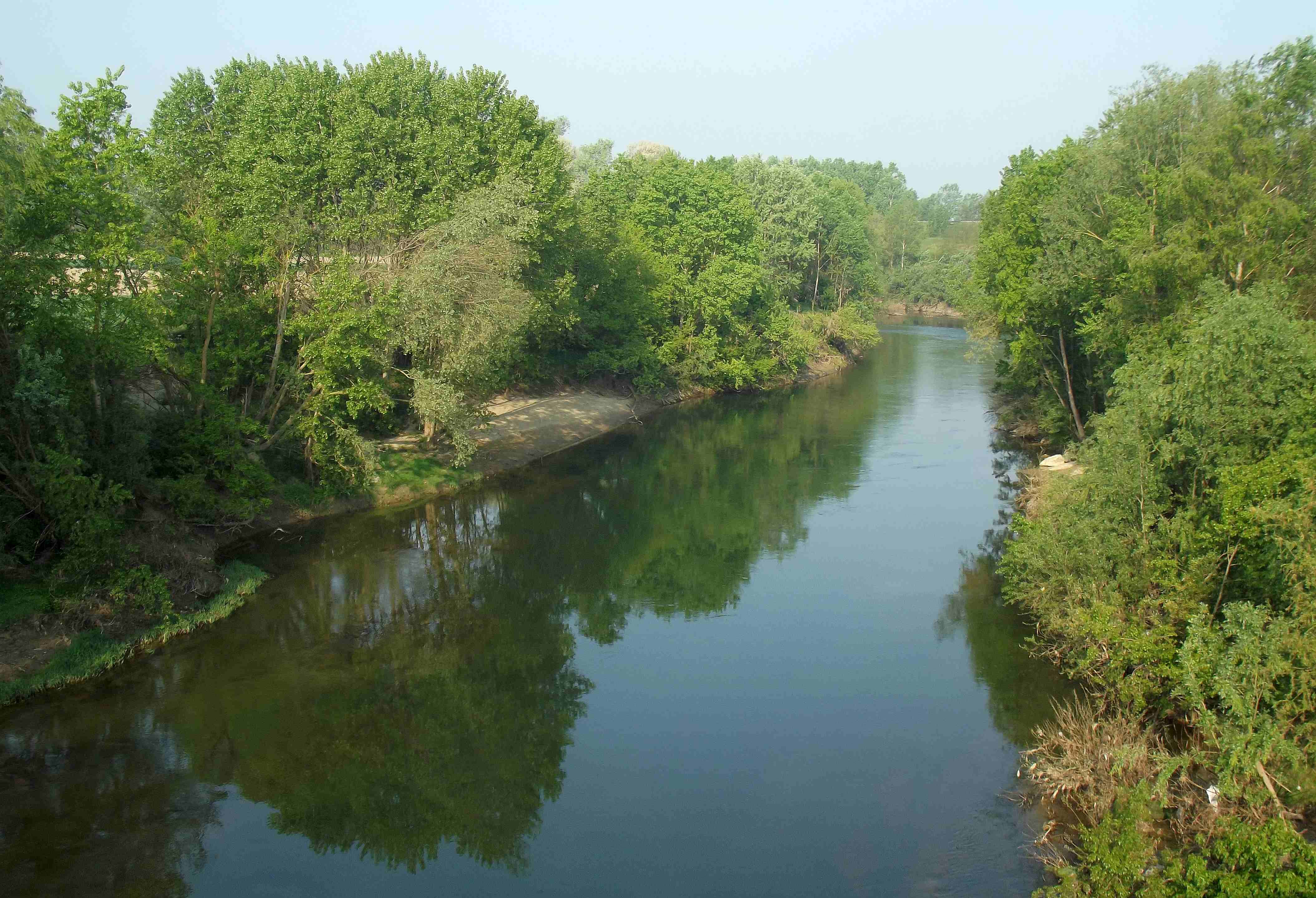
- The Bormida between Castellazzo and Cantalupo

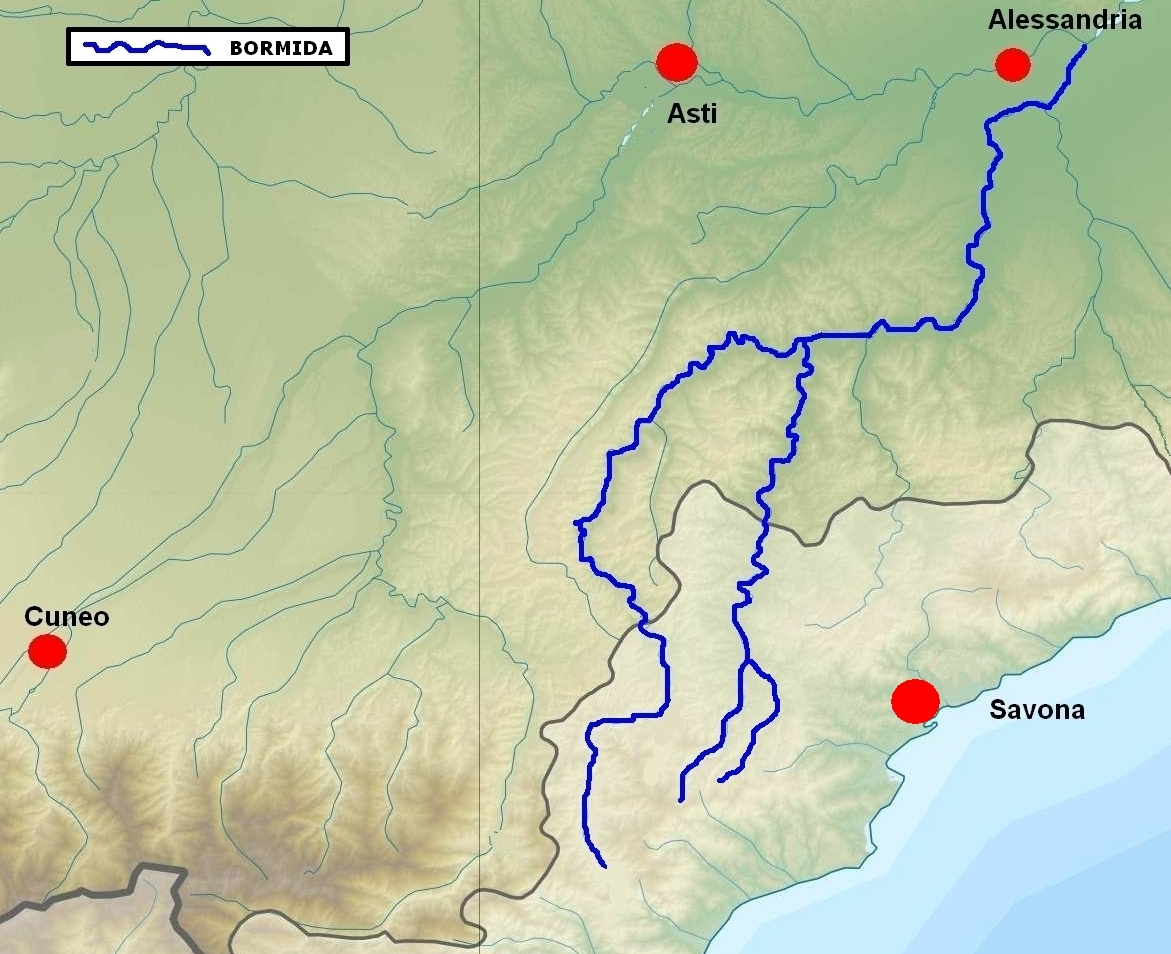
- Bormida location within NW Italy

Location
- Country: Italy

Physical characteristics
- Source
  - location: Rocca Barbena, Liguria
  - elevation: Colle Scravaion, 800 m (2,600 ft)
- Mouth
  - location: Tanaro
  - coordinates: 44.9345°N 8.6746°E
- Length: 153 km (95 mi)
- Basin size: 3,663 km^{2} (1,414 mi^{2})
- Discharge
  - average: 44.2 m^{3}/s (1,560 cu ft/s)

Basin features
- Progression: Tanaro→ Po→ Adriatic Sea
- Tributaries
  - right: Bormida di Spigno, Erro, Orba

The Bormida (Bormia in Piedmontese language) is a river of north-western Italy.

== Toponymy ==
The hydronym Bormida derives from the pre-Roman Ligurian proto-form *bormo ('warm or bubbling water'), also linked to the names of the gods of the springs Bormō and Bormānus. Similar hydronyms are present in the region: the river Borbera and the river Borbore, but also the town of Bormio in Lombardy known since the ancient times for the thermal waters and the town of Burbons les bains in France known for the same reason. The root *borm- itself could have pre-Indo-European origins and, therefore, could be connected with the lost language (or languages) of Prehistoric inhabitants of Europe who occupied Northern Italy before the possible arrival of the Indo-Europeans.

== Geography ==
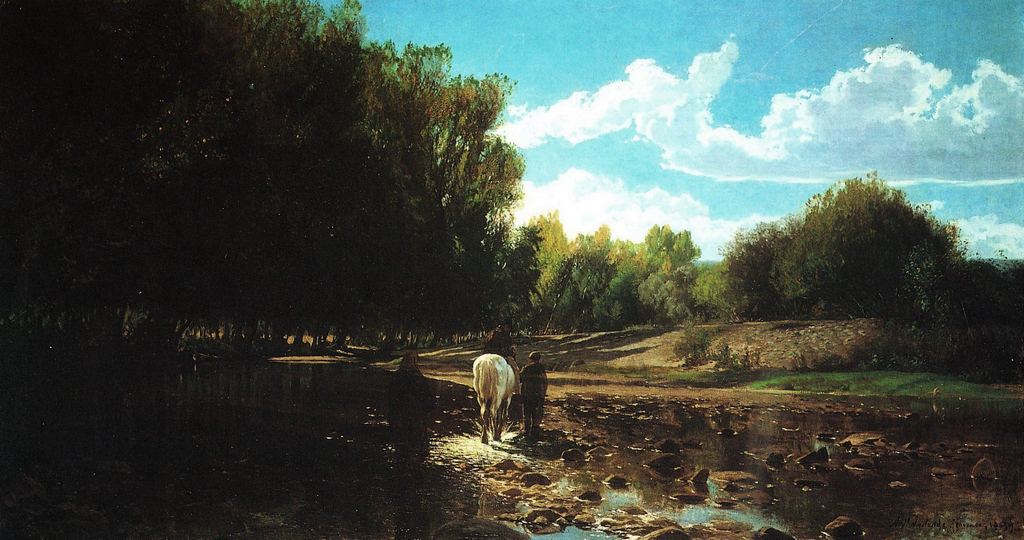
Motivo sulla Bormida, Alfredo d'Andrade, 1865

The Bormida rises in Liguria from the Rocca Barbena (close to Colle Scravaion) as 'Bormida di Millesimo, and flows at first through Liguria and then through Piedmont. After converging with the Bormida di Spigno near Bistagno it joins the Tanaro, of which it is the major tributary, north-east of Alessandria.
