= Bistagno =

Municipality in Piedmont, Italy

- Comune
- Comune di Bistagno
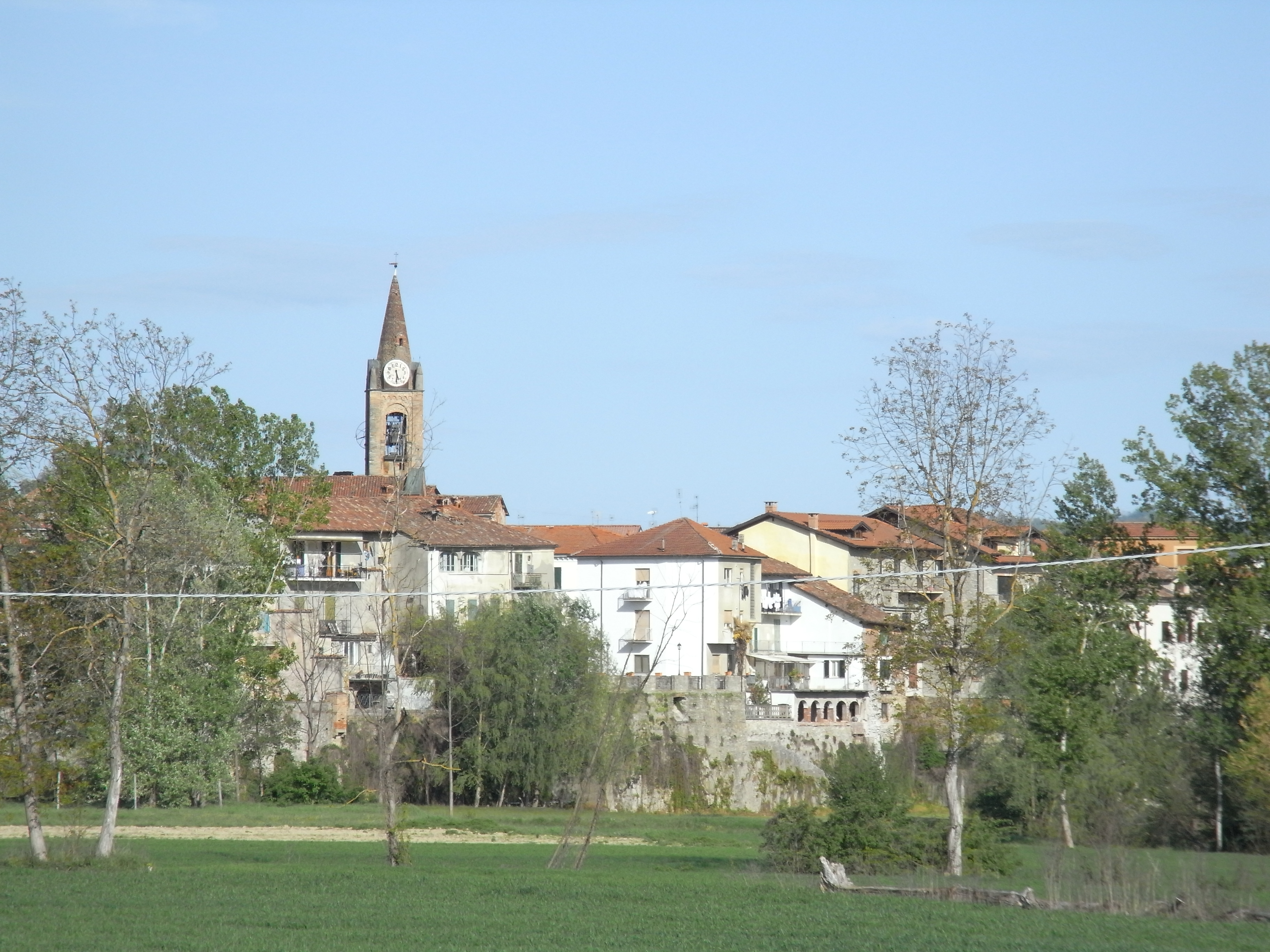
- View of Bistagno

- Coat of arms

- Location within Italy Location within Piedmont
- Coordinates: 44°40′N 8°22′E
- Country: Italy
- Region: Piedmont
- Province: Alessandria (AL)

Government
  - Mayor: Roberto Vallegra

Area
  - Total: 17.59 km^{2} (6.79 sq mi)
- Elevation: 175 m (574 ft)

Population (30 April 2017)
  - Total: 1,850
  - Density: 105/km^{2} (272/sq mi)
- Demonym: Bistagnesi
- Time zone: UTC+1 (CET)
  - Summer (DST): UTC+2 (CEST)
- Postal code: 15012
- Dialing code: 0144
- Patron saint: St. John the Baptist
- Saint day: 24 June
- Website: Official website

Bistagno is a comune (municipality) in the Province of Alessandria in the Italian region Piedmont, located about 70 kilometres (43 mi) southeast of Turin and about 35 kilometres (22 mi) southwest of Alessandria.

Bistagno borders the following municipalities: Castelletto d'Erro, Melazzo, Monastero Bormida, Montabone, Ponti, Rocchetta Palafea, Sessame, and Terzo.

In the center of the village is the Giulio Monteverde Gipsothèque, which houses the original plaster models of a native son who became a major Italian sculptor.

Although the most common and widespread etymology for the toponym is connected with the confluence of two 'branches' of the Bormida river (the Spigno Bormida and the Millesimo Bormida) in the territory of Bistagno (Bistagno < bi + stagno, bi(s)- + pond, where 'pond' would not only indicate a stagnant body of water, but would be also connected with the root *agn- > Latin amnis, in the meaning of 'river', 'water course', 'stream', 'torrent'), a new etymology, based on linguistic evidence, connects Bistagno with *bĭst-ăgnŏ-s (Proto-Indo-European ~ Celtic), which would mean 'small pheasant', and would allude to the presence of this specific bird in the territory of the village in the Neolithic or, in any case, in prehistoric times.

== People ==
- Giuseppe Saracco (1821–1907), politician
- Giulio Monteverde (1837–1917), sculptor

== Twin towns ==
- Flaviac, France
