= Malvicino =

- Comune
- Comune di Malvicino
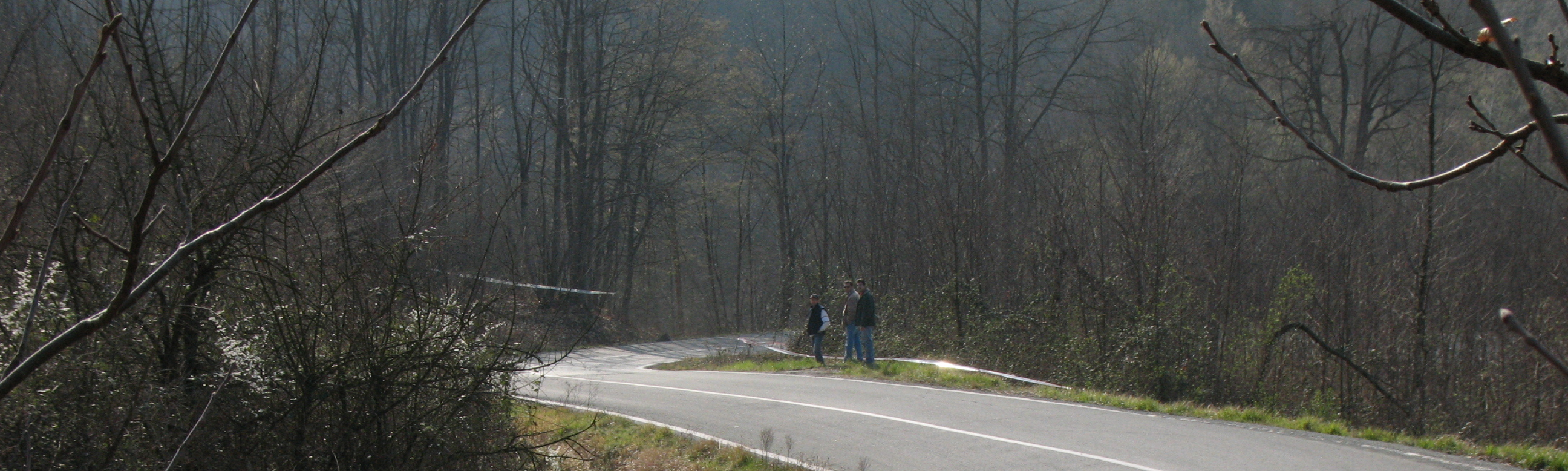

- Location within Italy Location within Piedmont
- Coordinates: 44°34′N 8°25′E
- Country: Italy
- Region: Piedmont
- Province: Alessandria (AL)

Government
  - Mayor: Francesco Nicolotti

Area
  - Total: 9.04 km^{2} (3.49 sq mi)
- Elevation: 420 m (1,380 ft)

Population (31 May 2017)
  - Total: 82
  - Density: 9.1/km^{2} (23/sq mi)
- Demonym: Malvicinesi
- Time zone: UTC+1 (CET)
  - Summer (DST): UTC+2 (CEST)
- Postal code: 15015
- Dialing code: 0144
- Website: Official website

Malvicino is a comune (municipality) in the Province of Alessandria in the Italian region Piedmont, located about 80 km (50 mi) southeast of Turin and about 40 km (25 mi) southwest of Alessandria.

Malvicino borders the following municipalities: Cartosio, Montechiaro d'Acqui, Pareto, Ponzone, and Spigno Monferrato.
