= Terzo, Piedmont =

Terzo
- Comune
- Comune di Terzo
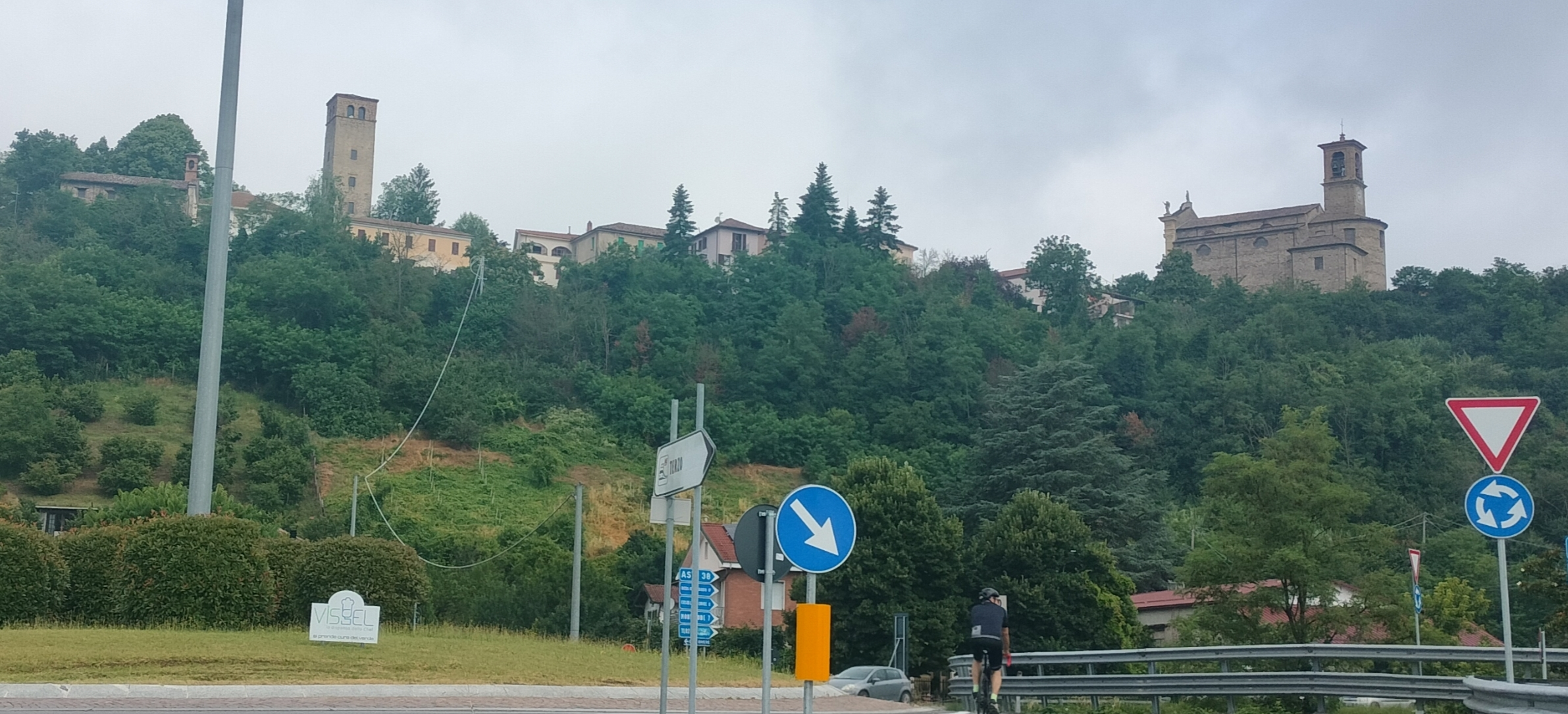

- Coat of arms

- Location within Italy Location within Piedmont
- Coordinates: 44°40′N 8°25′E
- Country: Italy
- Region: Piedmont
- Province: Alessandria (AL)

Government
  - Mayor: Vittorio Giovanni Grillo

Area
  - Total: 8.8 km^{2} (3.4 sq mi)
- Elevation: 222 m (728 ft)

Population (2005)
  - Total: 874
  - Density: 99/km^{2} (260/sq mi)
- Demonym: Terzesi
- Time zone: UTC+1 (CET)
  - Summer (DST): UTC+2 (CEST)
- Postal code: 15010
- Dialing code: 0144

Terzo is a comune (municipality) in the Province of Alessandria in the Italian region Piedmont, located about 70 kilometres (43 mi) southeast of Turin and about 30 kilometres (19 mi) southwest of Alessandria.

It was a fortress of the bishop of Acqui, of which only a late medieval tower remains. Terzo borders the following municipalities: Acqui Terme, Bistagno, Melazzo, and Montabone.
