= Berengar II =

Berengar II may refer to:

- Berengar II of Italy (died 966), margrave of Ivrea and king of Italy
- Berengar II of Neustria (died 896), Frankish margrave
- Berengar II of Sulzbach (died 1125), German nobleman
- Berengar II (archbishop of Narbonne) (died 1211/2), Catalan prelate

== See also ==
- Berengar I
- Ramon Berenguer II
