= Castello d'Agogna =

- Comune
- Comune di Castello d'Agogna
- Coat of arms

- Location within Italy Location within Lombardy
- Coordinates: 45°14′N 8°41′E
- Country: Italy
- Region: Lombardy
- Province: Pavia (PV)

Government
  - Mayor: Carlo Ercole Rolandi

Area
  - Total: 10.6 km^{2} (4.1 sq mi)

Population (31 December 2004)
  - Total: 1,008
  - Density: 95.1/km^{2} (246/sq mi)
- Demonym: Castellanesi
- Time zone: UTC+1 (CET)
  - Summer (DST): UTC+2 (CEST)
- Postal code: 27030
- Dialing code: 0384
- Patron saint: Santa Maria Bambina
- Saint day: September 8

Castello d'Agogna is a small town and comune (municipality) in the Province of Pavia in the Italian region Lombardy, located about 45 km (28 mi) southwest of Milan and about 35 km (22 mi) west of Pavia. It is crossed by the Agogna river.

Castello d'Agogna borders the following municipalities: Ceretto Lomellina, Mortara, Olevano di Lomellina, Sant'Angelo Lomellina, Zeme.

== History ==
In the Middle Ages the village belonged to the abbey of Santa Croce di Mortara, and in 1387 it became a fief of the lords of Robbio. Later it was part of the Duchy of Milan. In 1713 it became part of the Duchy of Savoy, and in 1859 was included in the province of Pavia.

== Demographic evolution ==
Historical population

Year	Pop.	±%
1861	683	—
1871	829	+21.4%
1881	877	+5.8%
1901	945	+7.8%
1911	803	−15.0%

Year	Pop.	±%
1921	768	−4.4%
1931	633	−17.6%
1936	692	+9.3%
1951	770	+11.3%
1961	549	−28.7%

Year	Pop.	±%
1971	648	+18.0%
1981	806	+24.4%
1991	861	+6.8%
2001	969	+12.5%

Source: Data from ISTAT
