= Sant'Angelo Lomellina =

- Comune
- Comune di Sant'Angelo Lomellina
- Location within Italy Location within Lombardy
- Coordinates: 45°14′N 8°41′E
- Country: Italy
- Region: Lombardy
- Province: Province of Pavia (PV)

Area
  - Total: 10.4 km^{2} (4.0 sq mi)

Population (Dec. 2004)
  - Total: 821
  - Density: 78.9/km^{2} (204/sq mi)
- Time zone: UTC+1 (CET)
  - Summer (DST): UTC+2 (CEST)
- Postal code: 27030
- Dialing code: 0384

Sant'Angelo Lomellina is a comune (municipality) in the Province of Pavia in the Italian region Lombardy, located about 45 km (28 mi) southwest of Milan and about 35 km (22 mi) west of Pavia. As of 31 December 2004, it had a population of 821 and an area of 10.4 km^{2} (4.0 sq mi).

Sant'Angelo Lomellina borders the following municipalities: Castello d'Agogna, Castelnovetto, Ceretto Lomellina, Cozzo, Zeme.

== Demographic evolution ==
Historical population

Year	Pop.	±%
1861	896	—
1871	1,065	+18.9%
1881	1,227	+15.2%
1901	1,397	+13.9%
1911	1,402	+0.4%

Year	Pop.	±%
1921	1,298	−7.4%
1931	1,137	−12.4%
1936	1,160	+2.0%
1951	1,130	−2.6%
1961	1,006	−11.0%

Year	Pop.	±%
1971	768	−23.7%
1981	663	−13.7%
1991	711	+7.2%
2001	828	+16.5%

Source: Data from ISTAT
