= Cozzo =

- Comune
- Comune di Cozzo
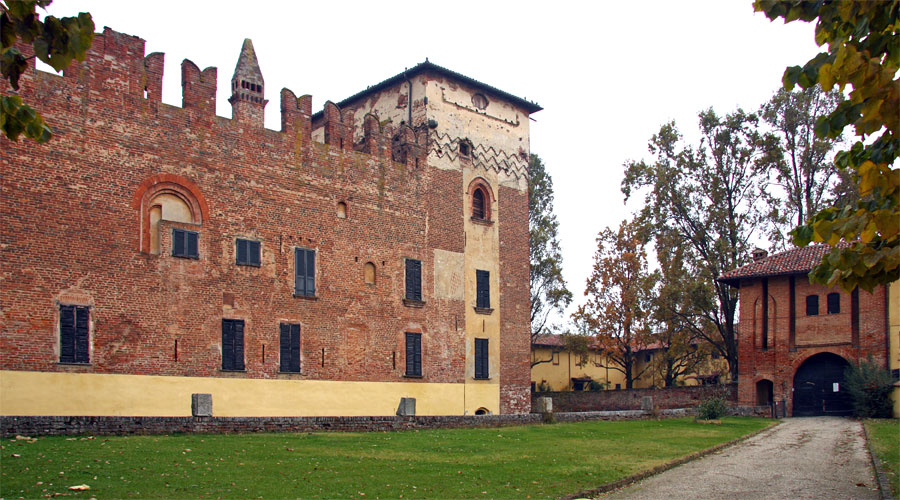

- Location within Italy Location within Lombardy
- Coordinates: 45°12′N 8°37′E
- Country: Italy
- Region: Lombardy
- Province: Province of Pavia (PV)

Area
  - Total: 17.4 km^{2} (6.7 sq mi)

Population (Dec. 2004)
  - Total: 421
  - Density: 24.2/km^{2} (62.7/sq mi)
- Time zone: UTC+1 (CET)
  - Summer (DST): UTC+2 (CEST)
- Postal code: 27030
- Dialing code: 0384

Cozzo is a comune (municipality) in the Province of Pavia in the Italian region Lombardy, located about 50 km (31 mi) southwest of Milan and about 40 km (25 mi) west of Pavia. As of 31 December 2004, it had a population of 421 and an area of 17.4 km^{2} (6.7 sq mi).

Cozzo borders the following municipalities: Candia Lomellina, Castelnovetto, Langosco, Rosasco, Sant'Angelo Lomellina, Valle Lomellina, Zeme.

== Demographic evolution ==
Historical population

Year	Pop.	±%
1861	1,525	—
1871	1,617	+6.0%
1881	1,873	+15.8%
1901	2,202	+17.6%
1911	1,897	−13.9%

Year	Pop.	±%
1921	1,695	−10.6%
1931	1,496	−11.7%
1936	1,391	−7.0%
1951	1,419	+2.0%
1961	1,112	−21.6%

Year	Pop.	±%
1971	742	−33.3%
1981	503	−32.2%
1991	427	−15.1%
2001	432	+1.2%

Source: Data from ISTAT
