= Parona =

- Comune
- Comune di Parona
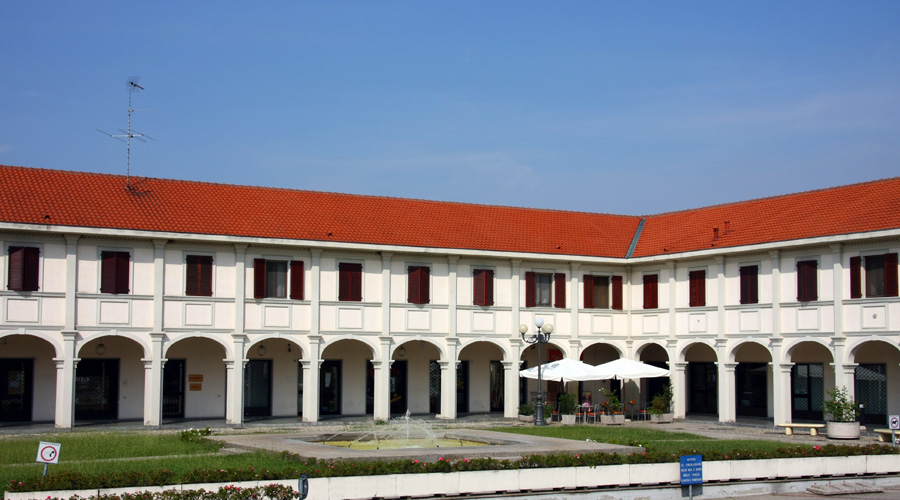

- Coat of arms

- Location within Italy Location within Lombardy
- Coordinates: 45°17′N 8°45′E
- Country: Italy
- Region: Lombardy
- Province: Province of Pavia (PV)

Area
  - Total: 9.3 km^{2} (3.6 sq mi)
- Elevation: 113 m (371 ft)

Population (Dec. 2004)
  - Total: 1,793
  - Density: 190/km^{2} (500/sq mi)
- Demonym: Paronesi
- Time zone: UTC+1 (CET)
  - Summer (DST): UTC+2 (CEST)
- Postal code: 27020
- Dialing code: 0384
- Website: Official website

Parona is a comune (municipality) in the Province of Pavia in the Italian region Lombardy, located about 40 km (25 mi) southwest of Milan and about 35 km (22 mi) northwest of Pavia. As of 31 December 2004, it had a population of 1,793 and an area of 9.3 km^{2} (3.6 sq mi).

Parona borders the following municipalities: Albonese, Cilavegna, Mortara, Vigevano.

== Demographic evolution ==
Historical population

Year	Pop.	±%
1861	1,871	—
1871	1,907	+1.9%
1881	2,164	+13.5%
1901	2,062	−4.7%
1911	2,017	−2.2%

Year	Pop.	±%
1921	1,810	−10.3%
1931	1,643	−9.2%
1936	1,652	+0.5%
1951	1,699	+2.8%
1961	1,710	+0.6%

Year	Pop.	±%
1971	1,302	−23.9%
1981	1,325	+1.8%
1991	1,500	+13.2%
2001	1,698	+13.2%

Source: Data from ISTAT
