= Borgolavezzaro =

- Comune
- Comune di Borgolavezzaro
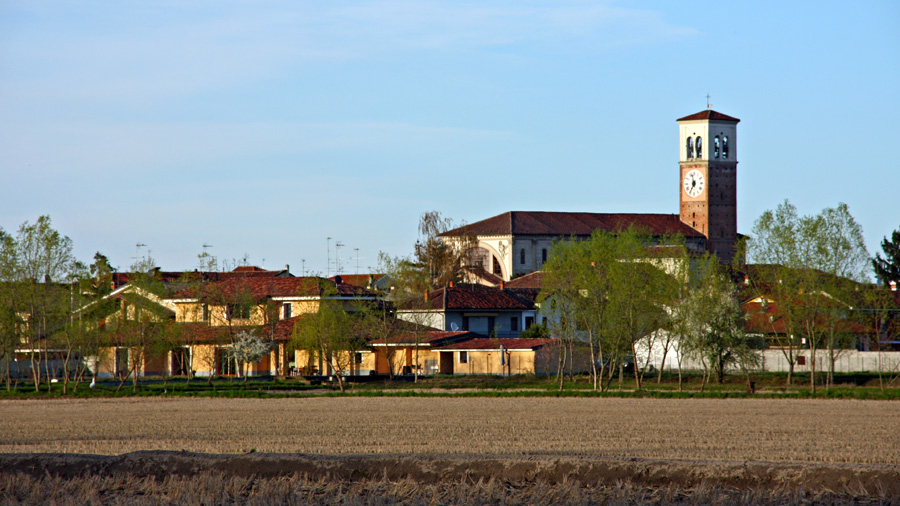
- View of Borgolavezzaro

- Coat of arms

- Location within Italy Location within Piedmont
- Coordinates: 45°19′N 8°42′E
- Country: Italy
- Region: Piedmont
- Province: Novara (NO)

Government
  - Mayor: Annalisa Achilli

Area
  - Total: 21.09 km^{2} (8.14 sq mi)
- Elevation: 118 m (387 ft)

Population (Dec. 2004)
  - Total: 1,909
  - Density: 90.52/km^{2} (234.4/sq mi)
- Demonym: Borgolavezzaresi
- Time zone: UTC+1 (CET)
  - Summer (DST): UTC+2 (CEST)
- Postal code: 28071
- Dialing code: 0321
- Website: Official website

Borgolavezzaro (Piedmontese: Borghlavzar, Lombard: Burglavsàr) is a comune (municipality) in the Province of Novara in the Italian region of Piedmont, which is located about 80 kilometres (50 mi) northeast of Turin and about 15 kilometres (9 mi) southeast of Novara.

Borgolavezzaro borders the following municipalities: Albonese, Cilavegna, Nicorvo, Robbio, Tornaco, Vespolate.

Borgolavezzaro was founded in 1200.

It was the birthplace of several figures like the war minister and Alpine group's founder Cesare Magnani Ricotti, the italian writers Luigi Gramegna and Gaudenzio Merula, and Luigi Tornielli, politician and founder of BPN one of the most important bank of northern Italy.
