= Castelnovetto =

- Comune
- Comune di Castelnovetto
- Location within Italy Location within Lombardy
- Coordinates: 45°15′N 8°37′E
- Country: Italy
- Region: Lombardy
- Province: Province of Pavia (PV)

Area
  - Total: 18.5 km^{2} (7.1 sq mi)

Population (Dec. 2004)
  - Total: 640
  - Density: 35/km^{2} (90/sq mi)
- Time zone: UTC+1 (CET)
  - Summer (DST): UTC+2 (CEST)
- Postal code: 27030
- Dialing code: 0384

Castelnovetto is a comune (municipality) in the Province of Pavia in the Italian region Lombardy, located about 50 km (31 mi) southwest of Milan and about 45 km (28 mi) west of Pavia. As of 31 December 2004, it had a population of 640 and an area of 18.5 km^{2} (7.1 sq mi).

Castelnovetto borders the following municipalities: Ceretto Lomellina, Cozzo, Nicorvo, Robbio, Rosasco, Sant'Angelo Lomellina.

== Demographic evolution ==
Historical population

Year	Pop.	±%
1861	1,664	—
1871	1,720	+3.4%
1881	2,035	+18.3%
1901	2,147	+5.5%
1911	2,057	−4.2%

Year	Pop.	±%
1921	1,811	−12.0%
1931	1,506	−16.8%
1936	1,505	−0.1%
1951	1,439	−4.4%
1961	1,164	−19.1%

Year	Pop.	±%
1971	901	−22.6%
1981	743	−17.5%
1991	696	−6.3%
2001	643	−7.6%

Source: Data from ISTAT
