= Langosco =

- Comune
- Comune di Langosco
- Location within Italy Location within Lombardy
- Coordinates: 45°13′N 8°34′E
- Country: Italy
- Region: Lombardy
- Province: Province of Pavia (PV)

Area
  - Total: 15.7 km^{2} (6.1 sq mi)

Population (Dec. 2004)
  - Total: 467
  - Density: 29.7/km^{2} (77.0/sq mi)
- Time zone: UTC+1 (CET)
  - Summer (DST): UTC+2 (CEST)
- Postal code: 27030
- Dialing code: 0384

Langosco is a comune (municipality) in the Province of Pavia in the Italian region Lombardy, located about 50 kilometres (31 mi) southwest of Milan and about 45 kilometres (28 mi) west of Pavia. As of 31 December 2004, it had a population of 467 and an area of 15.7 square kilometres (6.1 mi^{2}).

Langosco borders the following municipalities: Candia Lomellina, Caresana, Cozzo, Motta de' Conti, Rosasco.

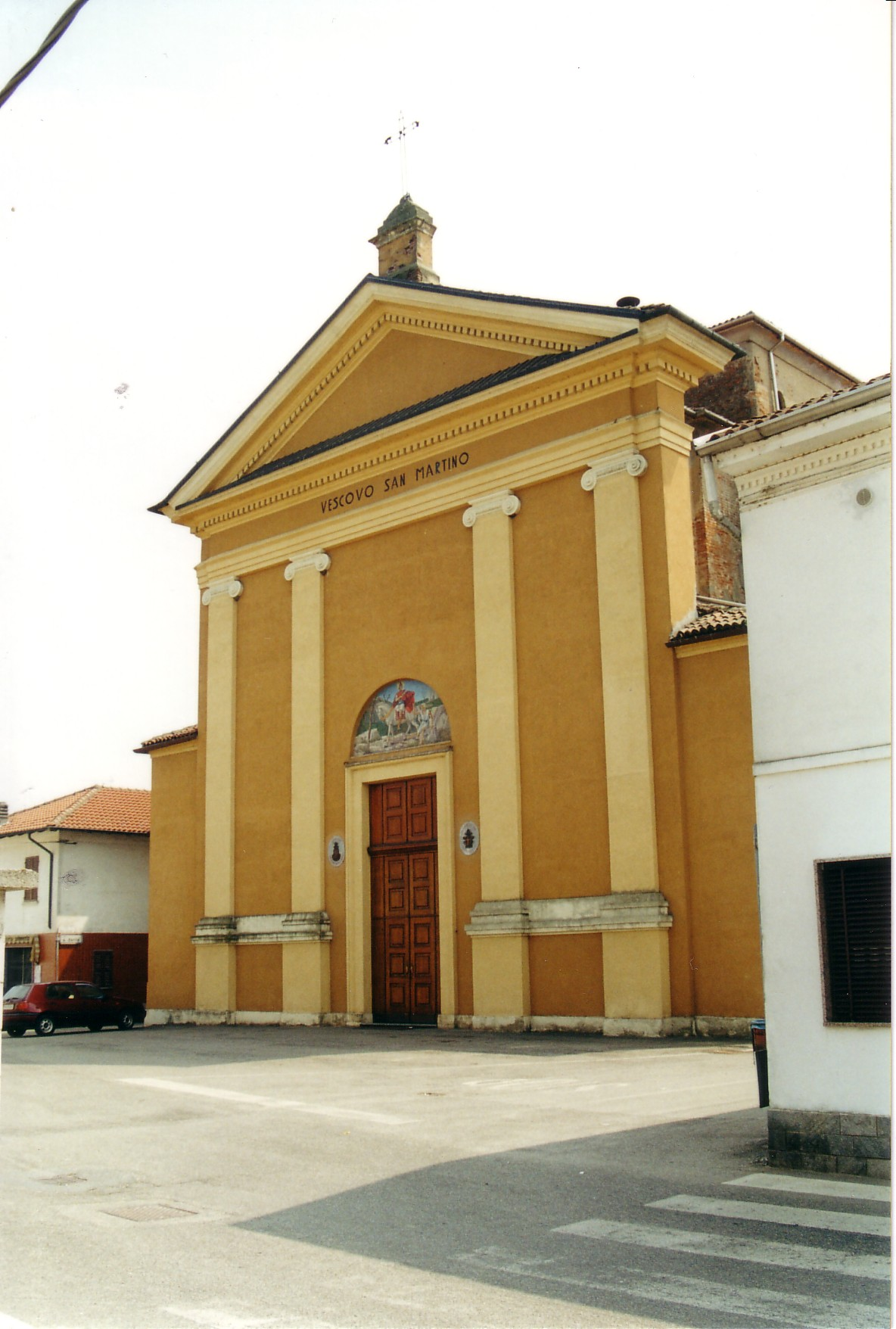
church in Langosco

== Demographic evolution ==
Historical population

Year	Pop.	±%
1861	1,737	—
1871	1,860	+7.1%
1881	2,117	+13.8%
1901	2,208	+4.3%
1911	1,954	−11.5%

Year	Pop.	±%
1921	1,784	−8.7%
1931	1,510	−15.4%
1936	1,507	−0.2%
1951	1,426	−5.4%
1961	1,122	−21.3%

Year	Pop.	±%
1971	770	−31.4%
1981	578	−24.9%
1991	449	−22.3%
2001	458	+2.0%

Source: Data from ISTAT
