= Caresana, Piedmont =

Caresana
- Comune
- Comune di Caresana
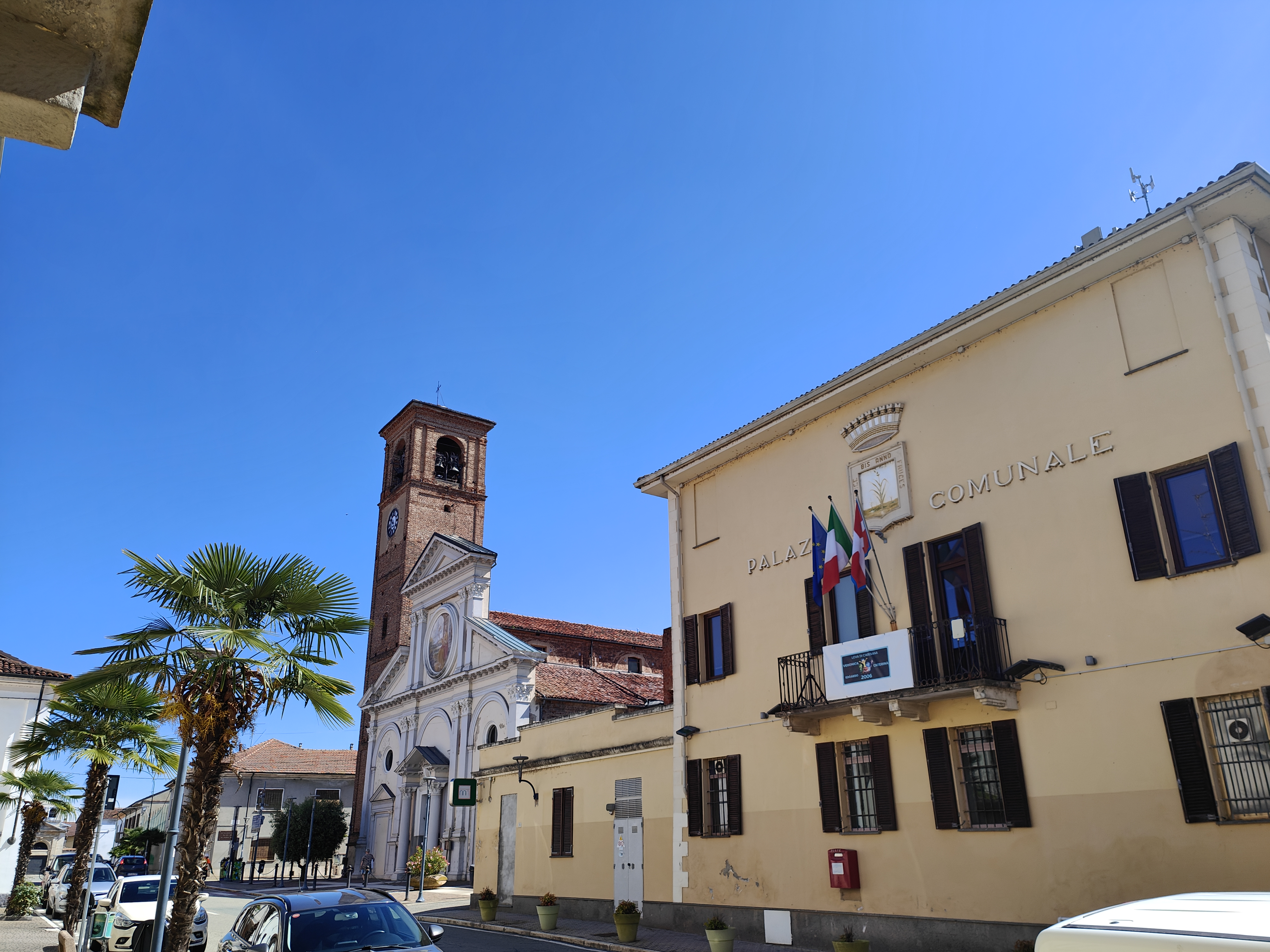

- Coat of arms

- Location within Italy Location within Piedmont
- Coordinates: 45°13′N 8°30′E
- Country: Italy
- Region: Piedmont
- Province: Province of Vercelli (VC)

Government
  - Mayor: Claudio Tambornino

Area
  - Total: 23.7 km^{2} (9.2 sq mi)
- Elevation: 119 m (390 ft)

Population (Dec. 2004)
  - Total: 1,083
  - Density: 45.7/km^{2} (118/sq mi)
- Time zone: UTC+1 (CET)
  - Summer (DST): UTC+2 (CEST)
- Postal code: 13010
- Dialing code: 0161
- Patron saint: San Giorgio, San Matteo

Caresana is a comune (municipality) in the Province of Vercelli in the Italian region Piedmont, located about 70 kilometres (43 mi) northeast of Turin and about 13 kilometres (8 mi) southeast of Vercelli. As of 31 December 2004, it had a population of 1,083 and an area of 23.7 square kilometres (9.2 mi^{2}).

Caresana borders the following municipalities: Langosco, Motta de' Conti, Pezzana, Rosasco, Stroppiana, Villanova Monferrato.

== Demographic evolution ==
Historical population

Year	Pop.	±%
1861	3,281	—
1871	3,449	+5.1%
1881	3,674	+6.5%
1901	3,783	+3.0%
1911	3,546	−6.3%

Year	Pop.	±%
1921	3,082	−13.1%
1931	2,818	−8.6%
1936	2,657	−5.7%
1951	2,424	−8.8%
1961	1,979	−18.4%

Year	Pop.	±%
1971	1,525	−22.9%
1981	1,281	−16.0%
1991	1,159	−9.5%
2001	1,068	−7.9%

Source: Data from ISTAT
