= San Valeriano, Robbio =

- San Valeriano
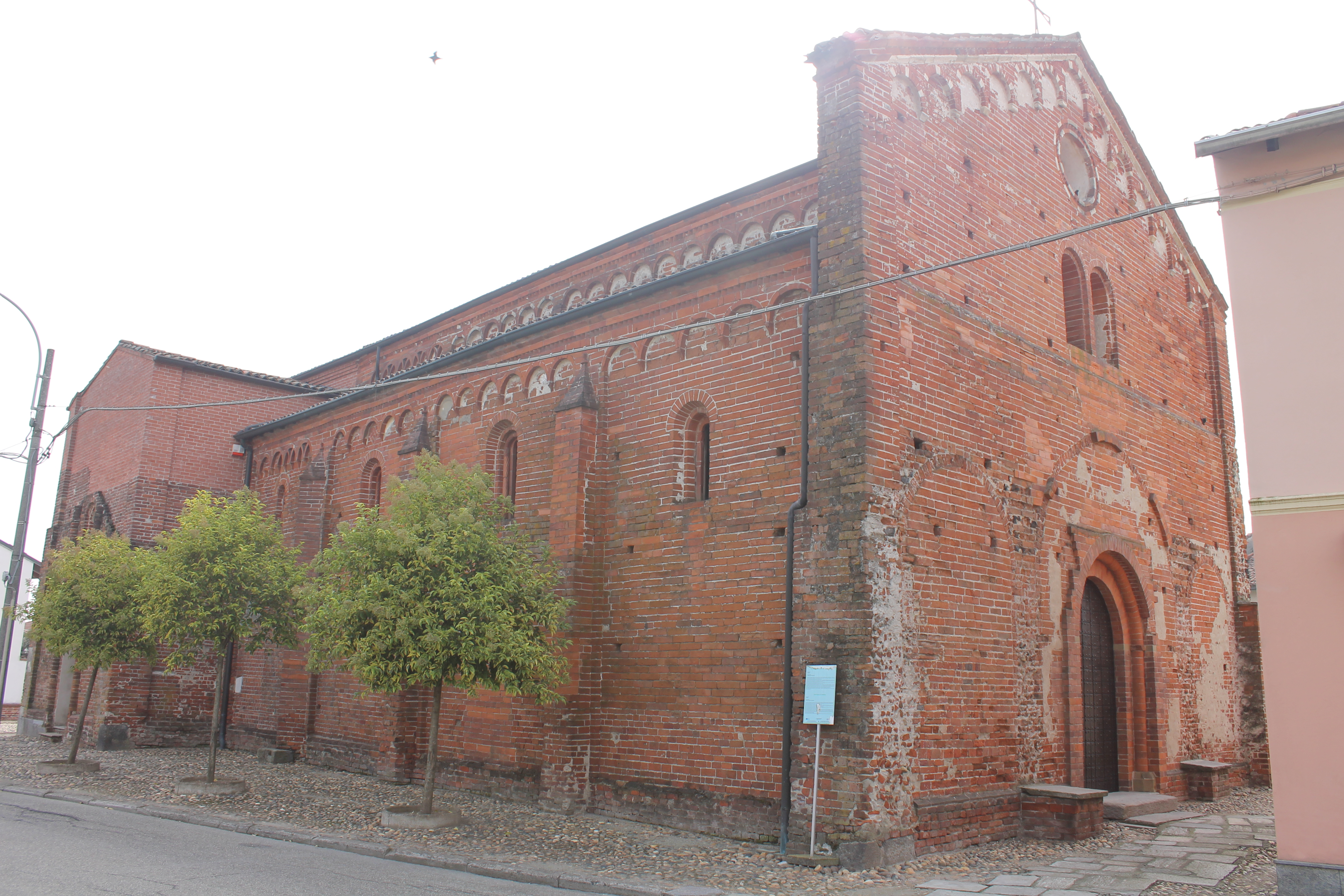
- Facade of Church
- San Valeriano, Robbio
- 45°17′13″N 8°35′19″E
- Location: Robbio
- Country: Italy
- Denomination: Catholic

History
- Founded: 12th Century

Architecture
- Style: Romanesque

Administration
- Diocese: Vercelli

San Valeriano is a Romanesque-style Roman Catholic church located on Via Francigena 43-95 in the town of Robbio, province of Pavia, Italy.

== History ==
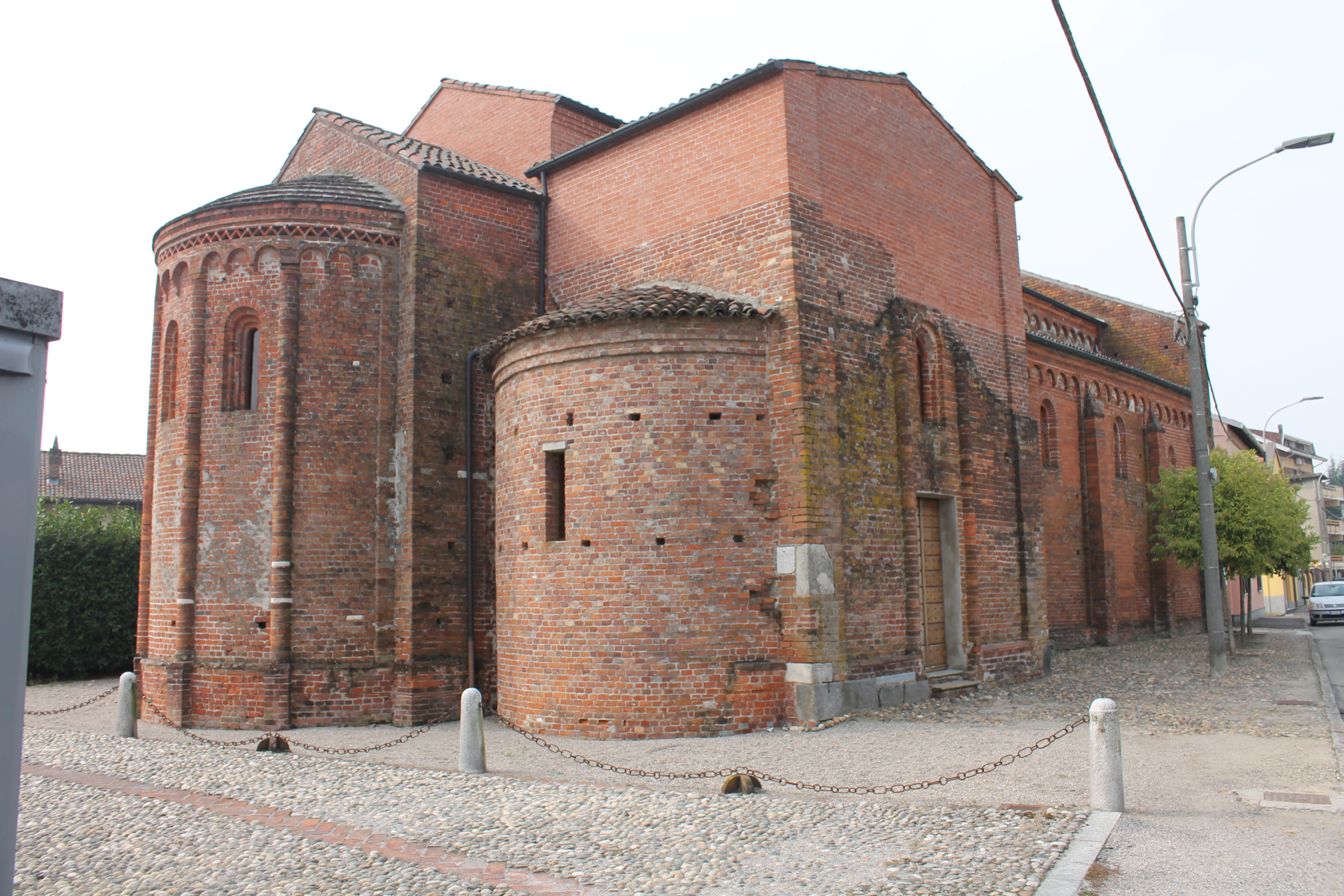
Apse of church

A church at the site is documented since the 12th century, when it was part of a Benedictine order Cluniac monastery which stood along the pilgrimage route to Rome, known as the Via Francigena. The monastery suffered much over the centuries; one inscription notes the monastery was destroyed in 1216. Built with brick, the church has three naves and the three apses ends in a typical Romanesque hemicycles. The monastery buildings are no longer extant. There are no remains of a former belltower, which was still present in the 16th century. The church is dedicated to St Valerian, a bishop martyred in Tunisia by Genseric in 460. The relics of this Pre-Schism western saint were putatively brought to Pavia, and then to Robbio. The church was deconsecrated centuries ago, and for a time used as a warehouse or barracks. There is no internal decoration.
