= Albonese =

Albonese Albones (Lombard)
- Comune
- Comune di Albonese
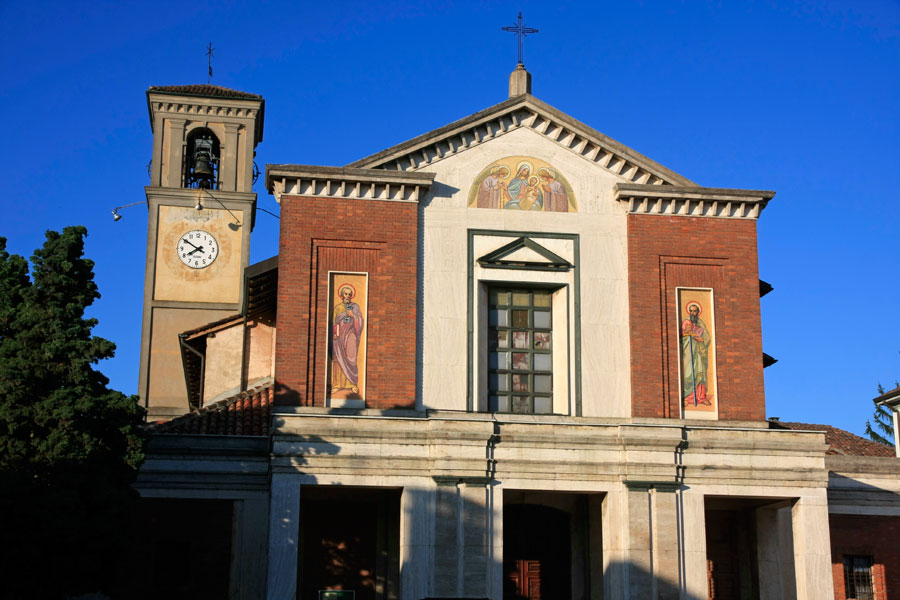
- View of Albonese

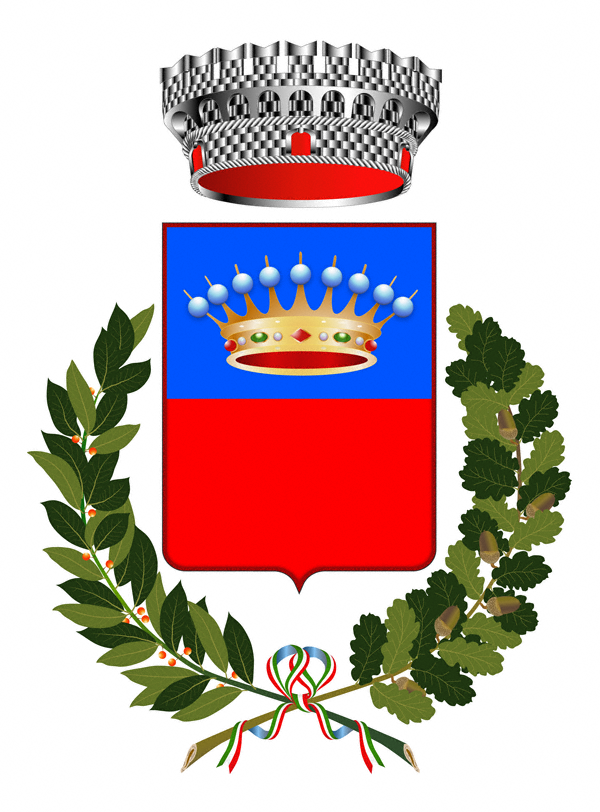
- Coat of arms

- Location of Albonese in Italy Albonese (Lombardy)
- Coordinates: 45°18′N 8°42′E
- Country: Italy
- Region: Lombardy
- Province: Pavia (PV)

Government
  - Mayor: Andrea Bazzano

Area
  - Total: 4.3 km^{2} (1.7 sq mi)
- Elevation: 113 m (371 ft)

Population (Dec. 2004)
  - Total: 492
  - Density: 110/km^{2} (300/sq mi)
- Demonym: Albonesini
- Time zone: UTC+1 (CET)
  - Summer (DST): UTC+2 (CEST)
- Postal code: 27020
- Dialing code: 0384
- Website: Official website

Albonese (Lombard: Albones) is a comune (municipality) in the Province of Pavia in the Italian region of Lombardy, located about 40 km southwest of Milan and about 40 km northwest of Pavia.

Albonese borders the following municipalities: Borgolavezzaro, Cilavegna, Mortara, Nicorvo, Parona.
