= Motta de' Conti =

- Comune
- Comune di Motta de' Conti
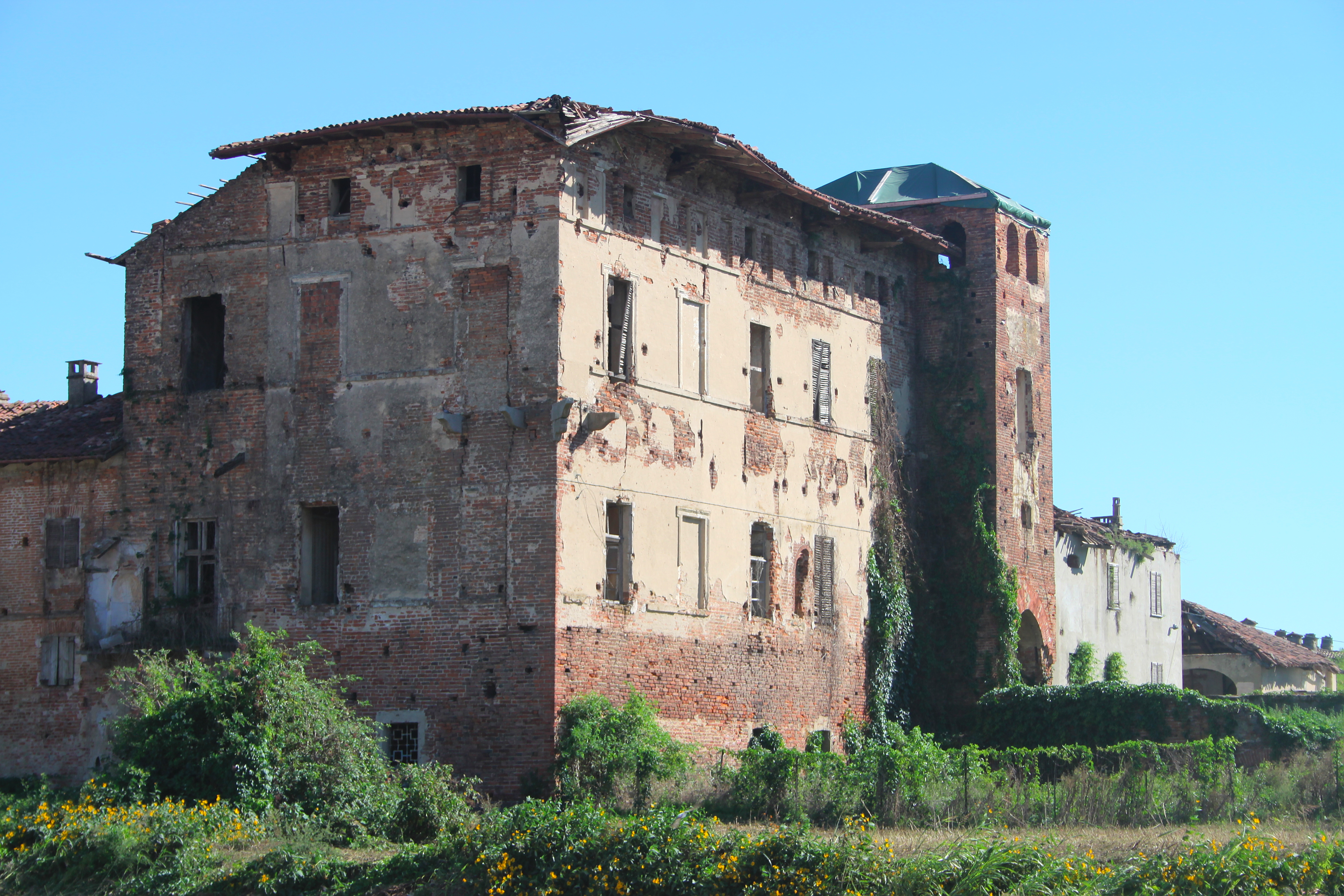

- Location within Italy Location within Piedmont
- Coordinates: 45°11′N 8°32′E
- Country: Italy
- Region: Piedmont
- Province: Vercelli (VC)
- Frazioni: Mantie

Government
  - Mayor: Emanuela Quirci

Area
  - Total: 11.72 km^{2} (4.53 sq mi)
- Elevation: 107 m (351 ft)

Population (Dec. 2004)
  - Total: 851
  - Density: 72.6/km^{2} (188/sq mi)
- Demonym: Mottesi
- Time zone: UTC+1 (CET)
  - Summer (DST): UTC+2 (CEST)
- Postal code: 13010
- Dialing code: 0161
- Website: Official website

Motta de' Conti is a comune (municipality) in the Province of Vercelli in the Italian region Piedmont, located about 70 kilometres (43 mi) east of Turin and about 15 kilometres (9 mi) southeast of Vercelli.

Motta de' Conti borders the following municipalities: Candia Lomellina, Caresana, Casale Monferrato, Langosco, and Villanova Monferrato.
