= Castle of Montearagón =

Castle in Aragon, Spain

Coordinates: 42°09′13″N 0°20′39″W

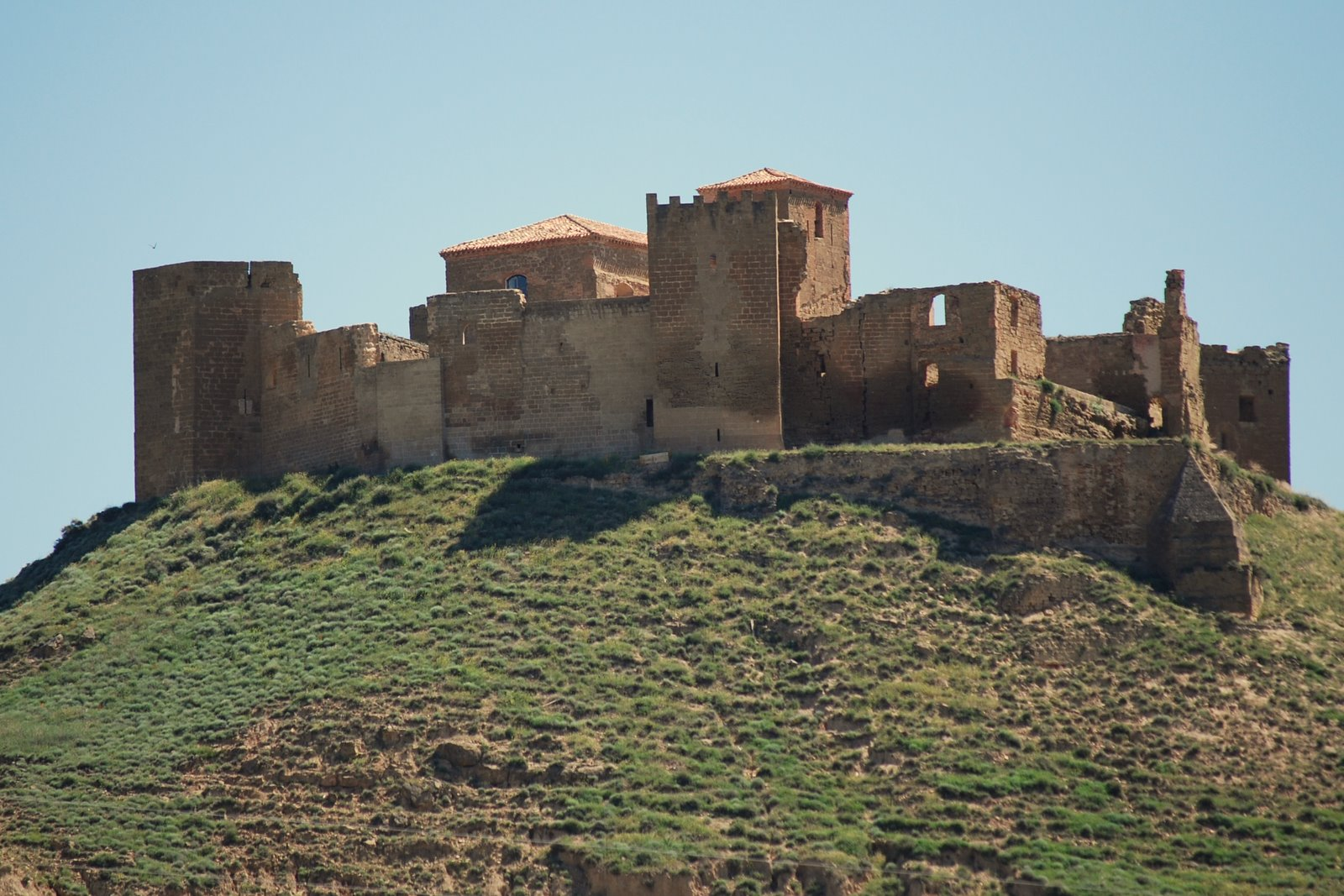
Castle of Montearagón.

The Castle of Montearagón was a fortress-monastery in Quicena, near Huesca, Aragon, Spain, built in the Romanesque style. It is now in ruins.

In 1094 Sancho Ramirez reinforced the castle to help with the siege of the Muslim stronghold of Wasqah (Huesca); here he met his death by a stray arrow as he was reconnoitering the city's walls. The city was conquered in 1096 by Peter I of Aragon, after defeating the relief forces in the Battle of Alcoraz.

== List of abbots ==
1. 1089–1097: Simón
2. 1097–1118: Ximeno
3. 1119–1169: Fortún
4. 1170–1204: Berenguer
5. 1204–1204: Frontancio
6. 1205–1249: Fernando de Aragón
7. 1252–1258: Sancho de Orradre
8. 1258–1284: Joan Garcés de Oris
9. 1284–1306: Ximeno Pérez de Gurrea
10. 1306–1317: Pero López de Luna
11. 1317–1320: Juan de Aragón
12. 1320–1323: Ramón de Aviñón
13. 1323–1327: Bernat de la Avellana
14. 1327–1353: Ximeno López de Gurrea
15. 1353–1359: Pero López Lope de Gurrea
16. 1359–1391: Ramón de Sellan
17. 1391–1395: Mafiano d'Alaman
18. 1395–1420: Juan Martínez de Murillo
19. 1420–1445: Sanxo de Murillo
20. 1445–1462: Carlos d'Urries
21. 1462–1464: Pedro Santangel
22. 1464–1473: Juan de Aragón
23. 1473–1490: Juan de Revolledo
24. 1492–1520: Alonso de Aragón
25. 1520–1527: Alonso de So, Castro y Pinós
26. 1528–1532: Pedro Jordan de Urriés
27. 1532–1534: Juan de Quintana
28. 1536–1546: Juan de Urrea
29. 1547–1552: Alonso de Aragón
30. 1554–1572: Pedro de Luna
31. 1573–1574: Pedro Vitales
32. 1587–1598: Marco Antonio Reves
33. 1600–1614: Juan López
34. 1615–1630: Martín Carrillo
35. 1631–1648: Jaime Ximenez de Ayerve
36. 1648–1662: Francisco Rodrigo
37. 1662–1665: Pantaleón Palacio y Villacampa
38. 1666–1678: Felipe Pomar y Cerdan
39. 1680–1708: Joseph Panzano
40. 1712–1731: Pedro Cayetano Nolibós
41. 1732–1746: Francisco Gamboa y Tamayo
42. 1747–1764: Francisco Herrero
43. 1765–1791: Miguel Asin
44. 1792–1814: Joseph Castillón
45. 1815-1837: Juan María González
