= San Pietro, Robbio =

- San Pietro
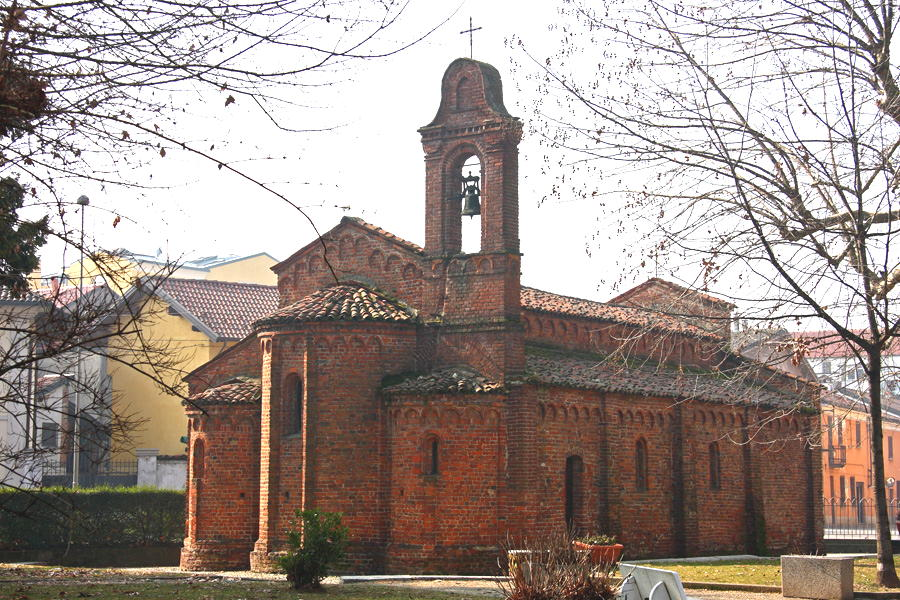
- Apse and flank of the church of San Pietro
- San Pietro, Robbio
- 45°17′16″N 8°35′42″E
- Location: Robbio
- Country: Italy
- Denomination: Catholic

History
- Founded: 12th Century
- Dedication: Saint Peter

Architecture
- Style: Romanesque

Administration
- Diocese: Vercelli

San Pietro is a small Romanesque-style Roman Catholic church located at the intersection of Via Mortara and Via Roma in the town center of Robbio, province of Pavia, Italy.

== History ==
A church at the site is documented since 1125-1150. Built with brick, the apse ends in a typical Romanesque hemicycle. Among the frescoes, is a Christ in a mandorla surrounded by the four evangelists. The fresco of the Trinity is dated 1507. The church and Robbio is located along the Via Francigena. The church was restored to its Romanesque decor in 1960.
