= Rosasco =

- Comune
- Comune di Rosasco
- Location within Italy Location within Lombardy
- Coordinates: 45°15′N 8°35′E
- Country: Italy
- Region: Lombardy
- Province: Province of Pavia (PV)

Area
  - Total: 19.8 km^{2} (7.6 sq mi)
- Elevation: 114 m (374 ft)

Population (Dec. 2004)
  - Total: 691
  - Density: 34.9/km^{2} (90.4/sq mi)
- Demonym: Rosaschesi
- Time zone: UTC+1 (CET)
  - Summer (DST): UTC+2 (CEST)
- Postal code: 27030
- Dialing code: 0384

Rosasco is a comune (municipality) in the Province of Pavia in the Italian region Lombardy, located about 50 km (31 mi) southwest of Milan and about 45 km (28 mi) west of Pavia. As of 31 December 2004, it had a population of 691 and an area of 19.8 km^{2} (7.6 sq mi).

Rosasco borders the following municipalities: Caresana, Castelnovetto, Cozzo, Langosco, Palestro, Pezzana, Robbio.

== Demographic evolution ==
Historical population

Year	Pop.	±%
1861	2,133	—
1871	2,356	+10.5%
1881	2,583	+9.6%
1901	2,731	+5.7%
1911	2,450	−10.3%

Year	Pop.	±%
1921	2,170	−11.4%
1931	1,817	−16.3%
1936	1,838	+1.2%
1951	1,720	−6.4%
1961	1,413	−17.8%

Year	Pop.	±%
1971	1,132	−19.9%
1981	934	−17.5%
1991	774	−17.1%
2001	712	−8.0%

Source: Data from ISTAT
