= Villanova Monferrato =

- Comune
- Comune di Villanova Monferrato
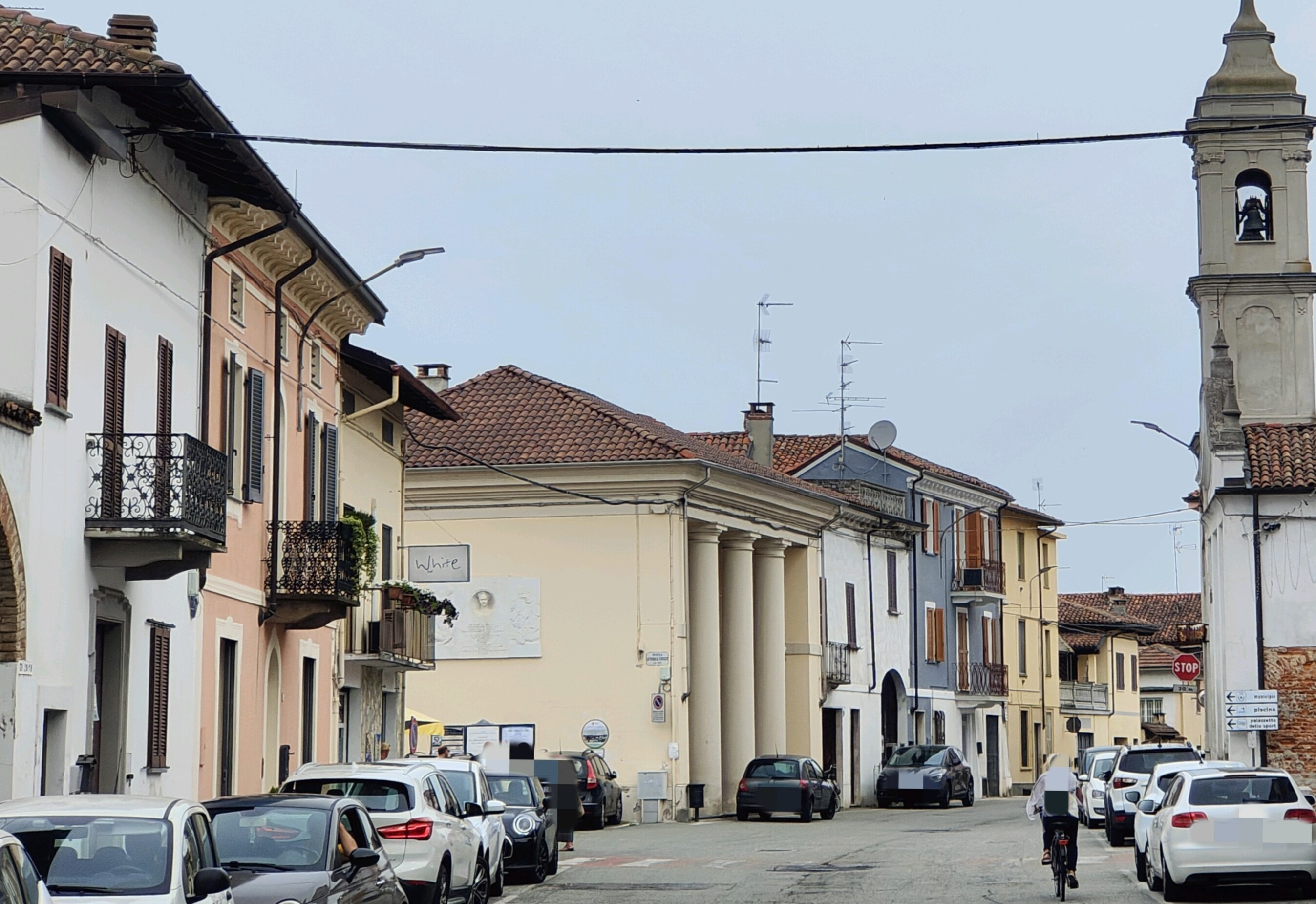

- Coat of arms

- Location within Italy Location within Piedmont
- Coordinates: 45°11′N 8°29′E
- Country: Italy
- Region: Piedmont
- Province: Alessandria (AL)

Government
  - Mayor: Fabrizio Bremide

Area
  - Total: 16.6 km^{2} (6.4 sq mi)
- Elevation: 111 m (364 ft)

Population (2005)
  - Total: 1,775
  - Density: 107/km^{2} (277/sq mi)
- Demonym: Villanovesi
- Time zone: UTC+1 (CET)
  - Summer (DST): UTC+2 (CEST)
- Postal code: 15030
- Dialing code: 0142
- Patron saint: St. Emilianus
- Saint day: July 16
- Website: Official website

Villanova Monferrato is a comune (municipality) in the Province of Alessandria in the Italian region Piedmont, located about 60 kilometres (37 mi) east of Turin and about 30 kilometres (19 mi) northwest of Alessandria and about 17 kilometres (11 mi) south of Vercelli. Located in the plain to the left of the Po, it the most northerly comune in the province, and borders on the comuni of Caresana, Motta de' Conti, Rive, and Stroppiana in the Vercelli, as well as those of Balzola and Casale Monferrato in the Province of Alessandria.

Notable buildings include the 19th-century parish church of Sant'Emiliano, the oratory of the confraternity of San Michele, and the town hall which contains a painting by Pier Francesco Guala depicting the Virgin and Child and the saints Emilian and Bernardino of Siena.

== See also ==
- Montferrat
