= Juan de Quintana =

Juan de Quintana (c.1482–1534) was an imperial theologian and Confessor to the Habsburg emperor Charles V.

== First years ==
Though it is unclear if he was born in Vic (Catalonia) or Sariñena (Huesca), Juan de Quintana was the son of Pedro de Quintana alias Navarro, a merchant who descended from the Quintanas, a family of butchers from the town of Vic, in the Principality of Catalonia. This family had apparently taken the name from a square called La Quintana, where butchers used to work in the same town. Pedro Quintana moved to the village of Sariñena in the last quarter of the 15th century, and Juan had at least two brothers, Sebastián and Pedro Quintana.

== Education and first royal assignments ==
By 1495, Juan Quintana was already a student, most likely in the Studium Generale of Arts in Zaragoza, and he later continued his education at the Sorbonne. During his studies in Paris, Juan Quintana interceded in favour of Llulism, along with professors Antonio and Luis Coronel. He later obtained his doctorate in Theology at this university in May 1520. At some point afterwards, and before 1522, Quintana became the Chaplain in King Charles V's retinue, and he started participating as a theologian in special royal assignments, such as the trials against the Protestant Probst and Grapheus. Quintana kept traveling with the royal retinue, and during the 1530s he kept being assigned to take part in additional royal religious decisions, clearly aimed at containing (and also repressing) theological ideas that would not be in agreement with the Catholic faith, which King Charles wanted to be preeminent: in 1525 he participated in the Edict against the Alumbrados, in 1526 in the Edict against the moriscos from Granada, and in 1527 was one of the experts who attended the Conference of Valladolid, in order to judge Erasmus's theological ideas.

== Contact with Michael Servetus ==
Some authors think that Dr. Juan de Quintana was an Erasmian, but others think otherwise, especially due to how extensively Quintana attacked Erasmus and his ideas during the Conference of Valladolid, saying that his ideas were false, heretical, deceiving, erroneous, or incredibly dangerous. One of the reasons for some authors to consider him a follower of Erasmus was that the famous polymath Michael Servetus claimed that he had been working in the service of Juan de Quintana, and as Servetus was an Erasmian, it was taken for granted that he learned those ideas from the royal chaplain, while they were in the royal retinue, in which there were some Erasmians. It seems clear that Quintana knew Servetus's family in Villanueva de Sigena, for his family was a neighbour of the Conesas, the maternal family. And it also seems Quintana could have known the young Servetus while he was studying in the Latin Grammar Studium of Sariñena around 1520, whose head was mosén Domingo Manobel. But it also seems that Servetus— whose name was not known in the royal retinue— learned Erasmus's ideas from the Studium Generale of Arts in Zaragoza, in which several of Erasmus's works were read to the students, and in which Servetus had been living from 1520 to 1527, first as a student and then as one of the four "Masters of Arts" (professors of Arts), while Quintana was traveling with the retinue.

== Last years ==
In 1530, shortly after Pope Clement VII crowned Charles V in Bologna, Dr. Juan de Quintana became the Emperor's Confessor and participated in the Diet of Augsburg, where he met and discussed theological issues with Philip Melanchthon. In 1532, from Regensburg, the emperor appointed him Abbot of Montearagon (with an income of 64,000 sueldos jaqueses), which his nephews from Vic took possession of. Juan de Quintana was also named Lord of the village of Sipán (Huesca), and came back to Spain with the emperor in 1533, for the celebration of the Corts of Monzón. He then visited the Castle of Montearagón, where he made several appointments. He remained with the imperial court until his death in Segovia at the end of 1534.
