= Nicorvo =

- Comune
- Comune di Nicorvo
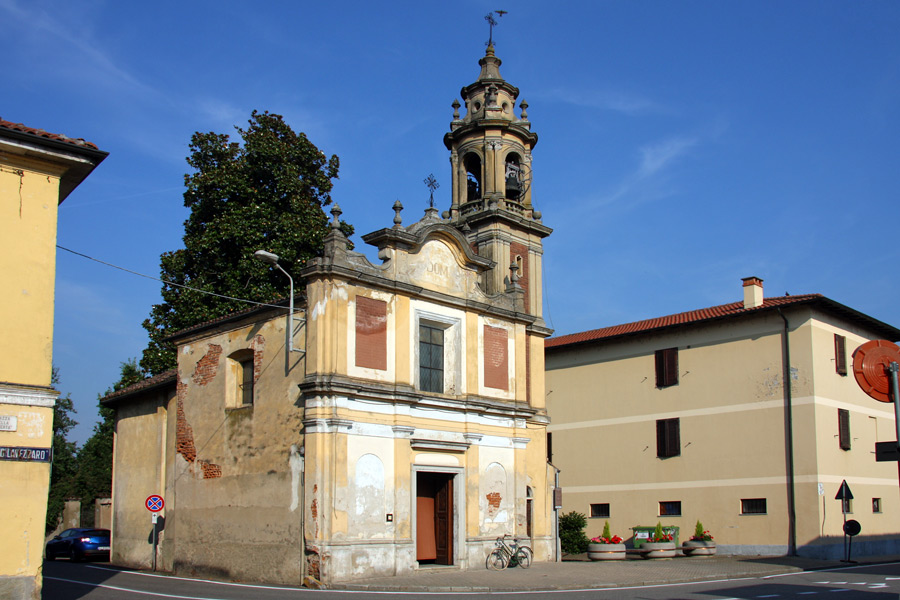
- Sanctuary of Madonna del Campo.

- Coat of arms

- Location within Italy Location within Lombardy
- Coordinates: 45°17′N 8°40′E
- Country: Italy
- Region: Lombardy
- Province: Pavia (PV)

Government
  - Mayor: Valter Ruzzoli

Area
  - Total: 8.2 km^{2} (3.2 sq mi)
- Elevation: 115 m (377 ft)

Population (30 April 2010)
  - Total: 370
  - Density: 45/km^{2} (120/sq mi)
- Demonym: Nicorvesi
- Time zone: UTC+1 (CET)
  - Summer (DST): UTC+2 (CEST)
- Postal code: 27020
- Dialing code: 0384
- Website: Official website

Nicorvo is a comune (municipality) in the Province of Pavia in the Italian region Lombardy, located about 45 km southwest of Milan and about 40 km northwest of Pavia. It is in the northern Lomellina, near the left bank of the Agogna river. Economy is based on agriculture, and especially on rice growing.

Nicorvo borders the following municipalities: Albonese, Borgolavezzaro, Castelnovetto, Ceretto Lomellina, Mortara, Robbio.
