= Ceretto Lomellina =

- Comune
- Comune di Ceretto Lomellina
- Location within Italy Location within Lombardy
- Coordinates: 45°15′N 8°40′E
- Country: Italy
- Region: Lombardy
- Province: Province of Pavia (PV)

Area
  - Total: 7.4 km^{2} (2.9 sq mi)

Population (Dec. 2004)
  - Total: 228
  - Density: 31/km^{2} (80/sq mi)
- Time zone: UTC+1 (CET)
  - Summer (DST): UTC+2 (CEST)
- Postal code: 27030
- Dialing code: 0384

Ceretto Lomellina is a comune (municipality) in the Province of Pavia in the Italian region Lombardy, located about 45 km (28 mi) southwest of Milan and about 40 km (25 mi) west of Pavia. As of 31 December 2004, it had a population of 228 and an area of 7.4 km^{2} (2.9 sq mi).

Ceretto Lomellina borders the following municipalities: Castello d'Agogna, Castelnovetto, Mortara, Nicorvo, Sant'Angelo Lomellina.

== Demographic evolution ==
Historical population

Year	Pop.	±%
1861	682	—
1871	734	+7.6%
1881	844	+15.0%
1901	817	−3.2%
1911	771	−5.6%

Year	Pop.	±%
1921	702	−8.9%
1931	626	−10.8%
1936	636	+1.6%
1951	631	−0.8%
1961	480	−23.9%

Year	Pop.	±%
1971	371	−22.7%
1981	270	−27.2%
1991	237	−12.2%
2001	211	−11.0%

Source: Data from ISTAT
