= Candia Lomellina =

- Comune
- Comune di Candia Lomellina
- Location within Italy Location within Lombardy
- Coordinates: 45°11′N 8°36′E
- Country: Italy
- Region: Lombardy
- Province: Province of Pavia (PV)
- Frazioni: Terrasa

Area
  - Total: 27.8 km^{2} (10.7 sq mi)

Population (Dec. 2004)
  - Total: 1,639
  - Density: 59.0/km^{2} (153/sq mi)
- Demonym: Candiesi
- Time zone: UTC+1 (CET)
  - Summer (DST): UTC+2 (CEST)
- Postal code: 27031
- Dialing code: 0384
- Website: Official website

Candia Lomellina is a comune (municipality) in the Province of Pavia in the Italian region Lombardy, located about 50 kilometres (31 mi) southwest of Milan and about 45 kilometres (28 mi) west of Pavia. As of 31 December 2004, it had a population of 1,639 and an area of 27.8 square kilometres (10.7 mi^{2}).

The municipality of Candia Lomellina contains the frazione (subdivision) Terrasa.

Candia Lomellina borders the following municipalities: Breme, Casale Monferrato, Cozzo, Frassineto Po, Langosco, Motta de' Conti, Valle Lomellina.

== Demographic evolution ==
Historical population

Year	Pop.	±%
1861	2,893	—
1871	3,168	+9.5%
1881	3,429	+8.2%
1901	3,476	+1.4%
1911	3,001	−13.7%

Year	Pop.	±%
1921	2,592	−13.6%
1931	2,453	−5.4%
1936	2,465	+0.5%
1951	2,462	−0.1%
1961	2,303	−6.5%

Year	Pop.	±%
1971	2,047	−11.1%
1981	1,816	−11.3%
1991	1,702	−6.3%
2001	1,646	−3.3%

Source: Data from ISTAT

== Notable Persons of Candia Lomellina ==
- Antipope Alexander V, Catholic Pope
- Giovanni Reale, philosopher
