= Robbio =

- Comune
- Comune di Robbio
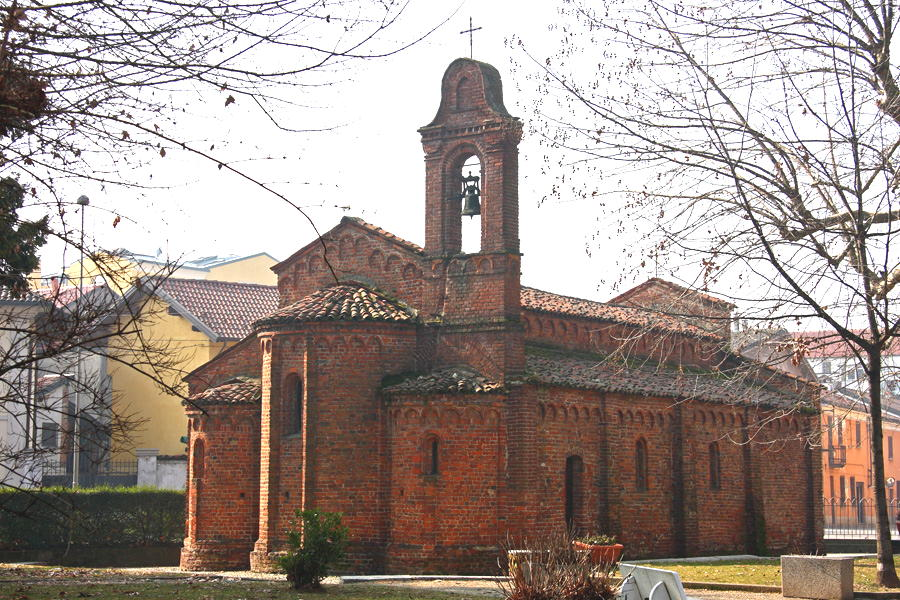
- Apse view of the church of St. Peter in Robbio.

- Coat of arms

- Location within Italy Location within Lombardy
- Coordinates: 45°17′N 8°36′E
- Country: Italy
- Region: Lombardy
- Province: Pavia (PV)
- Frazioni: La Torre

Government
  - Mayor: Roberto Francese

Area
  - Total: 40.3 km^{2} (15.6 sq mi)
- Elevation: 122 m (400 ft)

Population (30 April 2010)
  - Total: 6,161
  - Density: 153/km^{2} (396/sq mi)
- Demonym: Robbiesi
- Time zone: UTC+1 (CET)
  - Summer (DST): UTC+2 (CEST)
- Postal code: 27038
- Dialing code: 0384
- Patron saint: Madonna del Rosario
- Saint day: First Sunday in September
- Website: Official website

Robbio is a city and comune (municipality) in the Province of Pavia in the Italian region Lombardy, located about 50 km southwest of Milan and about 45 km west of Pavia. It is part of the Lomellina traditional region. Robbio borders the following municipalities: Borgolavezzaro, Castelnovetto, Confienza, Nicorvo, Palestro, Rosasco, Vespolate.

== History ==
The area of Robbio has been settled since Neolithic times. A Roman centre named Redobium is attested by Pliny the Elder. Later it was a Lombard town and, later, a possession of the Catholic diocese of Vercelli. Around the 11th century, it was acquired by the De Robbio family, who ruled it, together with the neighbouring area, until the 13th century, when it was contested between Vercelli and Pavia. In 1220, the latter definitively acquired it through a diploma issued by Emperor Frederick II.

Then part of the Duchy of Milan, it was entrusted to several feudal families. In 1748, it was acquired by the Kingdom of Sardinia and, in the 19th century, it became part of the province of Pavia under the newly formed Kingdom of Italy.

== Main sights ==
- Castello di Robbio: medieval Castle, now a public park.
- San Pietro: 13th century Romanesque church housing 16th-century frescoes attributed to Tommasino da Mortara.
- San Michele: 15th-century church with a late Gothic-style façade.
- San Valeriano: originally a 5th/6th century church, originally dedicated to St. Andrew, enlarged by Cluniac monks in the late 11th century. The apse is now separated from the main building.

== Notable people ==
People closely associated with Robbio include:

- Silvio Piola (29 September 1913 - 4 October 1996), a famous Italian soccer player.
- Enzo Emanuele (10 June 1977), a medical researcher.
