= Cilavegna =

Cilavegna Silavégna
- Comune
- Comune di Cilavegna
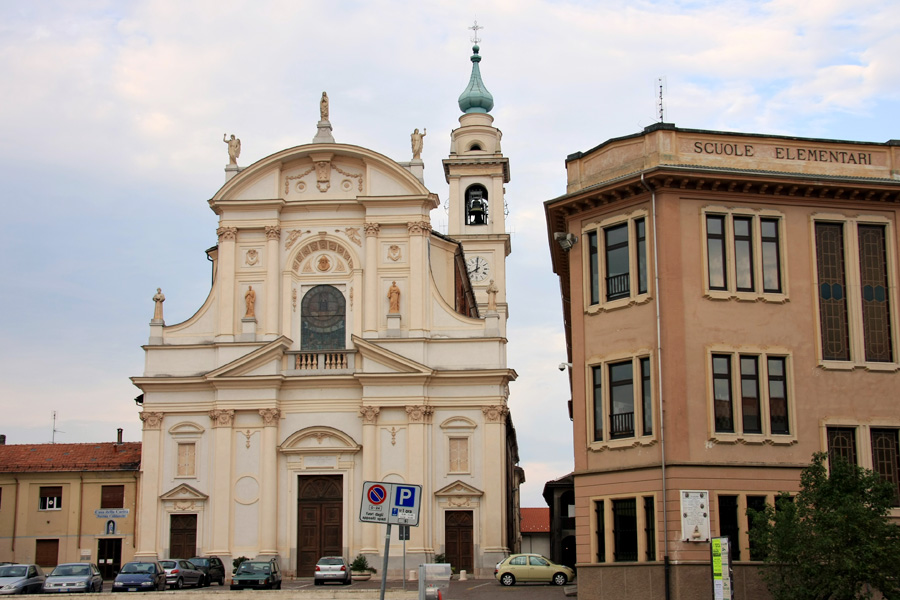

- Coat of arms

- Location within Italy Location within Lombardy
- Coordinates: 45°19′N 8°45′E
- Country: Italy
- Region: Lombardy
- Province: Pavia (PV)

Government
  - Mayor: Giovanna Falzone (Lista Civica)

Area
  - Total: 18.0 km^{2} (6.9 sq mi)
- Elevation: 115 m (377 ft)

Population (31 August 2019)
  - Total: 5,548
  - Density: 308/km^{2} (798/sq mi)
- Demonym: Cilavegnesi
- Time zone: UTC+1 (CET)
  - Summer (DST): UTC+2 (CEST)
- Postal code: 27024
- Dialing code: 0381
- Patron saint: Saints Peter and Paul
- Saint day: 29 July
- Website: Official website

Cilavegna (Italian: [tʃilaˈveɲɲa]; Western Lombard: Silavégna) is a comune (municipality) in the Province of Pavia in the Italian region Lombardy, at about 45 km southwest of Milan and about 35 km northwest of Pavia. It has 5440 inhabitants.

Cilavegna has had an ancient agricultural tradition since the times of the Romans, when it produced wine; nowadays pink asparagus is the most important crop.

In the first decade of the 20th century an industrial center sprang up not far from the city center. The first historical document specifically about the town is the concession of Berengar I, which is not dated, but is certainly from after 25 December 915, when he was crowned at Rome.

Cilavegna is mentioned in the psychological novel Ipotesi di cacciatore by Gregorio Ponci, in which the protagonist's family, with the last name Viscardo, traces its roots back to the 18th century in Cilavegna, also referred to as Cilavinnis, Cellavegna, Celavegno.

== Etymology ==
One hypothesis sees "Cilavegna" as composed of two words: the first is thought to be "cell", meaning a "deposit of military rations", or a typical Roman encampment along the roads of the Empire; the second, "venga," refers to an old agricultural practice in the area: cultivating grapes, or vines.

This hypothesis can be confirmed thanks to a historical concession made by Berengar I, presumably between the years 911 and 915, which uses the name Cilavinnis, very close to the Latin "vinea" or "vinum."

The process that through the years has led to the recent "Cilavegna" is due mostly to local dialects, from the progressive addition of the "g" in the last syllable and the variation between the masculine and feminine forms: "Celavegna" in 1164; "Cellavegna" in 1181, 1220, and 1250; "Cillavegna" also in 1181; "Celavegno" in the 12th century; and "Cellavigna" in 1219.

Analyzing the name's evolution through time, it can be seen that it is slowly progressing toward the words "cella" and "vinea," possibly confirming the Roman origins of the name; in what the name means now in Italian, "deposit near the vineyards," one finds a similar meaning to the supposed Latin original.

== History ==
The land around Cilavegna has been inhabited since the Mesolithic, but the oldest findings, from tombs of the Bronze Age, date back to 1300 B.C., when a series of conquests in the area were begun, by the [Laevi], the Galls, and then the Romans. The Romans controlled Cisalpine Gaul beginning in the first century B.C. and transformed the viability and usefulness of the region by building a network of roads that streamlined the long movements of armies toward central Europe. At this time many encampments were made with the simple purpose of supplying soldiers with provisions: one of these "castrum" was called "cells ad vineas," today Cilavegna, which occupies the strategic position between the Gaul and Vercellae (Vercelli) roads.

After the Lombard's conquest of northern and central Italy Cilavegna was the seat of a judge (or Gastald), subject to the supervision of the duke, while, after the conquests of Charlemagne, the city became a possession of the counts of Lomello. At this point the local castle was likely built, since in the 10th century, after the concession of Berengar I, it was on the front-line of defence against Magyar raids. After, many different families bought the city as feudal property. Notable were the Beccaria, the Castelbarco, and the Maletta families, and the Maletta, ultimately, ceded the town to Vercellino Visconti, who, with the annexations of the duke of Milan, was replaced with the rule of the Atellani family.

Then it fell under Taverna rule (1636–1798), which lasted until the collapse of feudalism, when Lombardy became a part of the Cisalpine Republic and then of the Kingdom of Lombardy–Venetia. At this time Cilavegna officially became a commune, and in 1818 it joined the province of Vigevanasco and after the Kingdom of Italy, beginning a policy of industrialization which would help the city flourish between the late 1800s and the first half the 1900s.

Numerous companies were started, but Ca.Gi is best remembered, a testament to the citizens’ typical antifascism, as in 1944 workers went on strike in support of the Committee for the Liberation of Upper Italy. The people had many other experiences in resisting fascism during the war, and now victims of the twenty years of fascism in Italy, are commemorated by a number of monuments.

After WWII, there were many projects dedicated to urban redevelopment, and an example of one of these is the "Casa Serena," built in 1967, connected to the city center by a new street. A fellow citizen, cav. Mario Pavesi wanted these projects, and desired a place to accommodate his employs who were in retirement. Since 1964, Cilavegna has had annual celebrations dedicated to pink asparagus, the city's most important crop.

== Coat of arms ==
Divided into two parts: in the first, there is a blue background with the subject of a silver dog with a gold collar, sitting on a silver pillow, placed in the left corner, staring at a gold star in the upper right-hand corner; the second half, on the other hand, is gold with a red-bricked castle with black windows. Exterior ornaments of the Municipality (by the D.P.R., September 26th, 1954)

Some documents suggest that the real coat of arms of Cilavegna was the one from 1458, "two cross keys with trifoliate handle", presumably in reference to the emblem of Saint Piero, patron saint of the town. What is certain, however, is that in 1954 it became necessary to make a coat arms of arms because Cilavegna had never had one of its own. It would need to be split, so that the old coat of arms of the Taverna family, the last lords of Cilavegna, was next to the figure of the town's castle. Permitted by the office of heraldry, the project was entrusted to Piero Maccaferri.

The coat of arms has been the same one ever since, but it is often criticized because it is not faithful to certain facts of the history of the town. The part dedicated to the lords of Taverna, in fact, is not related to Cilavegna, since it actually refers to the lords of Ladriano; instead the old emblem of Taverna calls for one white space with three crisscrossing black spaces, while the use of the "dog" was typical of the counts of Ladriano. It was, however, introduced to Cilavegna during the union between the feud and that which was "greater", and this is probably why the two are often confused.

In conclusion, it seems reasonable that the coat of arms should really have been split: One silver half with three wide black spaces, and the other with a gold background and the castle.

== Geography ==
Cilavegna is located in the Pianura Padana. The town borders on Piedmont (and its province of Novara) and is part of Alta Lomellina, a small region in the southwest of Lombardy between the Sesia river (to the west), the Po, (to the southwest), the Ticino (to the east), and the Basso Novarase (to the north).

The area is mostly flat (at 115 m.a.s.l.) with some sandy areas in relief, and it is distinguished by a single large forested area (called the "Bosco Oliva," or "Olive Forest") which today is protected by the local government: The town owns the property, but it has given access to it to a group of passionate local citizens so that the forest can be restored to having only native species. Mainly agricultural, the economy has changed the local environment, adapting it to the cultivation of various crops; particularly, the landscape is characterized by a dense network of canals and ditches, while the vegetation is enriched by fields of corn, rice paddies, poppy woods, and chestnut groves. The hydrographic mapping of the area reveals a number of springs, important for filling up waterways: The spring of Serami, two called the Pavese canal along the borders with Gravellona and Cassolnovo, the Amalia spring toward Albonese, and the springs called Boniforti and Cariariolo in the Calderina area.

A document that sheds light on the reason for the particular structure of the canals in Cilavegna is "Super aquis derivandis et conducendis," a law issued by Gian Galeazzo Sforza on 14 June 1483. With it the water of the canals (as, for example, la Biraghetta) would need to be supplied by the Sesia river and not by the nearer Agogna, which was reserved for Mortara, which, near Nicorvo, derived its own municipal canal.

Cilavegna is classified as a very low seismic risk area.

== Climate ==
Cilavegna's climate is typical of many towns in upper Lomellina, but, given how near it is to Piedmont (especially Novara), its climate is comparable with the data recorded by the Meteorological Station of Cameri (NO): through the years the winters have become less cold, but the temperature still remains around 0 °C. By contrast, warmer months are characterized by increasing temperatures. Furthermore, because of global warming, snowfall is rare and often limited to the coldest months, while in the summer humidity is common.

== Demographics ==
Historical population

Year	Pop.	±%
1861	3,643	—
1871	3,892	+6.8%
1881	4,130	+6.1%
1901	4,786	+15.9%
1911	4,833	+1.0%
1921	4,456	−7.8%
1931	4,102	−7.9%
1936	4,125	+0.6%

Year	Pop.	±%
1951	4,165	+1.0%
1961	4,533	+8.8%
1971	4,366	−3.7%
1981	4,211	−3.6%
1991	4,416	+4.9%
2001	4,976	+12.7%
2011	5,656	+13.7%

Source: Censuses

=== Ethnic groups ===
According to ISTAT, there are 296 residents of foreign origin in Cilavegna as of 31 December 2018, or 5.4% of the total. The largest foreign communities are from Romania (1.26%), Albania (0.68%) and Egypt (0.49%).

== International relations ==
Cilavegna has one sister city.

City	Country	Date
Condat-sur-Vienne	France	1956
