= Berengar II (archbishop of Narbonne) =

Berengar II (Catalan: Berenguer; French: Bérenger) was the archbishop of Narbonne from 1191 to 1211. He earlier served as the bishop of Lleida from 1177 to 1191 and concurrently served as abbot of Montearagón from 1170 to 1204.

Berengar was an illegitimate son of Count Raymond Berengar IV of Barcelona, born to a mistress taken between his father's betrothal to the child queen Petronilla of Aragon and their actual marriage in 1150. He was probably born around 1140. He was thus a half-brother of King Alfonso II of Aragon and uncle of Peter II. In 1170, he became abbot of Montearagón. He was elected bishop of Tarazona the same year, but was never consecrated. In 1176 or 1177, he became bishop of Lleida. He was given a dispensation to continue as abbot. He has been suspected of having never visited the diocese of Lleida. In 1179, he served Alfonso II as an ambassador to King Louis VII of France, seeking to avert a military campaign against the Cathar heresy in southern France. That year, he attended the Third Lateran Council. In 1191, through the influence of Viscountess Ermengarde, he was elected archbishop of Narbonne and the dispensation to continue as abbot was renewed.

Berengar's archiepiscopate coincided with rising concerns over the Cathars. In 1198, he met in Perpignan with Peter II, Count Raymond V of Toulouse and Count Bernard IV of Comminges to discuss the growing heresy. By 1200, Pope Innocent III was blaming him in strong terms for its growth in his diocese. In a letter to Cardinal Giovanni di San Paolo in 1200, the pope identified Berengar as "the fount and origin of so many and such great evils." He accused Berengar of having never made a canonical visitation; of simoniacally charging the bishop of Maguelone, Guillaume de Fleix, for his consecration; and of failing to hold a provincial synod to preach the crusade, as Innocent had ordered.

In May 1203, the pope wrote to Berengar that "fierce wolves attack the flocks entrusted to your care ... because like a dumb dog who refuses to bark, you neither put them to flight by barking nor do you, following the example of the good shepherd, lay down your life for your flock; but rather you flee, leaving them to the jaws of the wolves." He accused him of preferring to reside in Montearagón, neglecting his episcopal duties, and of being a lover of money. In January 1204, he wrote to him again, accusing him of mistreating the papal legates Pierre de Castelnau and Raoul de Fontfroide. The legates subsequently tried to depose Berengar from Narbonne. In May, Innocent wrote to them and to Arnauld Amaury accusing Berengar of downplaying simony, of sheltering the leader of the local routiers, of refusing to appoint priests to Capestang and Montiels so he could keep the revenue and of allowing the archdeacon of Narbonne and the abbot of Saint-Paul de Narbonne to hold multiple benefices at once. He was also accused of failing to assure hospitality for pilgrims on the Way of Saint James, which passed through the archdiocese of Narbonne.

Also in May 1204, Innocent wrote to Berengar to deprive him of the abbey fo Montearagón. In November 1204, Berengar appealed the decision, claiming to be the victim of persecution by the legates. Innocent rejected the appeal in June 1205. In early 1206, Berengar travelled to Rome for a personal audience with the pope. In June 1206, Innocent wrote to his legates that he now considered the loss of the abbacy sufficient punishment for Berengar, whom he regarded by then as old and infirm. In a letter to Arnauld Amaury and Navarre d'Acqs in 1207, Innocent suggests that Berengar had not reformed his behaviour as the pope had expected.

In June 1210, the pope ordered his legates, Arnauld Amaury and Hugh Raymond, to investigate "the great clamour" against Berengar and Archbishop Bernard of Auch. It has been argued that Berengar was deposed as a result of this investigation, in late 1211 or early 1212. There is no direct evidence of this, and it has been argued that he died in office in late 1211. One scholar dates his death to 11 August 1211. The necrology of the abbey of Montearagón dates his death to July or August in the year 1250 of the Spanish era (i.e., 1212).

== Sources ==
- Birch, Debra Julie (1998). Pilgrimage to Rome in the Middle Ages: Continuity and Change. The Boydell Press.
- Claramunt Rodríguez, Salvador (2022). "Berenguer". Diccionario Biográfico Español. Real Academia de la Historia.
- Costen, M. D. (1997). The Cathars and the Albigensian Crusade. Manchester University Press.
- Dossat, Yves (1944). "Le clergé méridional a la veille de la croisade albigéoise". Revue historique et litteraire du Languedoc. 1: 263–278.
- Durán Gudiol, Antonio (1978). "El obituario de los abades de Montearagón". Argensola. 85: 185–190.
- Graham-Leigh, Elaine (2001). "Hirelings and Shepherds: Archbishop Berenguer of Narbonne (1191–1211) and the Ideal Bishop". The English Historical Review. 116 (469): 1083–1102. JSTOR 1562287.
