= Berengar I =

Berengar I may refer to:

- Berengar I of Italy (died 924), margrave of Friuli, king of Italy and Holy Roman emperor
- Berengar I of Neustria (fl. 861–879), Frankish margrave
- Berengar I of Avignon (fl. 1163), viscount
- Berengar I (archbishop of Narbonne) (died 1162)

== See also ==
- Ramon Berenguer I
- Berengar II
