= Zeme, Lombardy =

Zeme
- Comune
- Comune di Zeme
- Location within Italy Location within Lombardy
- Coordinates: 45°12′N 8°40′E
- Country: Italy
- Region: Lombardy
- Province: Pavia (PV)

Area
  - Total: 25 km^{2} (9.7 sq mi)

Population (2018-01-01)
  - Total: 1,190
  - Density: 48/km^{2} (120/sq mi)
- Demonym: Zemesi
- Time zone: UTC+1 (CET)
  - Summer (DST): UTC+2 (CEST)
- Postal code: 27030
- Dialing code: 0384

Zeme is a village and comune in the Province of Pavia, in the Lombardy region of northwest Italy.

== History ==
In the Middle Ages Zeme was described as Cemide or Zemide. Since the tenth century Zeme belonged to the Bishop of Pavia and later to the priory of the Holy Cross of Mortara; in 1311 one half of the territory was confirmed as belonging to the Count palatine of Lomello. Zeme is named in imperial diplomas (1191, 1220) that assign the Lomellina to Pavia.

During the Visconti period it came under the power of Filippino, son of Facino Cane, who in 1524 sold it to condottiero Angelo della Pergola (lord also of Sartirana). In 1528 his great-nephew Francesco della Pergola sold Zeme to the San Cassiano family, but in 1532 Zeme was assigned to the Chapter (religion) and the Bishopric of Vigevano. The domain of the Bishopric ceased only with the abolition of feudalism (1771).

In 1818 Zeme was finally united with Marza and Sant'Alessandro, once comuni, now consisting of simple farms.
