= Montecastello =

Montecastello Moncasté
- Comune
- Comune di Montecastello
- Coat of arms

- Location within Italy Location within Piedmont
- Coordinates: 44°57′N 8°41′E
- Country: Italy
- Region: Piedmont
- Province: Alessandria (AL)
- Frazioni: San Bernardo, San Zeno

Government
  - Mayor: Gianluca Penna

Area
  - Total: 7.6 km^{2} (2.9 sq mi)
- Elevation: 116 m (381 ft)

Population (2005)
  - Total: 339
  - Density: 45/km^{2} (120/sq mi)
- Demonym: Montecastellesi
- Time zone: UTC+1 (CET)
  - Summer (DST): UTC+2 (CEST)
- Postal code: 15040
- Dialing code: 0131
- Website: http://www.comune.montecastello.al.it/

Montecastello is a comune (municipality) in the Province of Alessandria in the Italian region Piedmont, located about 80 kilometres (50 mi) east of Turin and about 6 kilometres (4 mi) northeast of Alessandria.

Montecastello borders the following municipalities: Alessandria, Bassignana, Pecetto di Valenza, Pietra Marazzi, Piovera, and Rivarone.

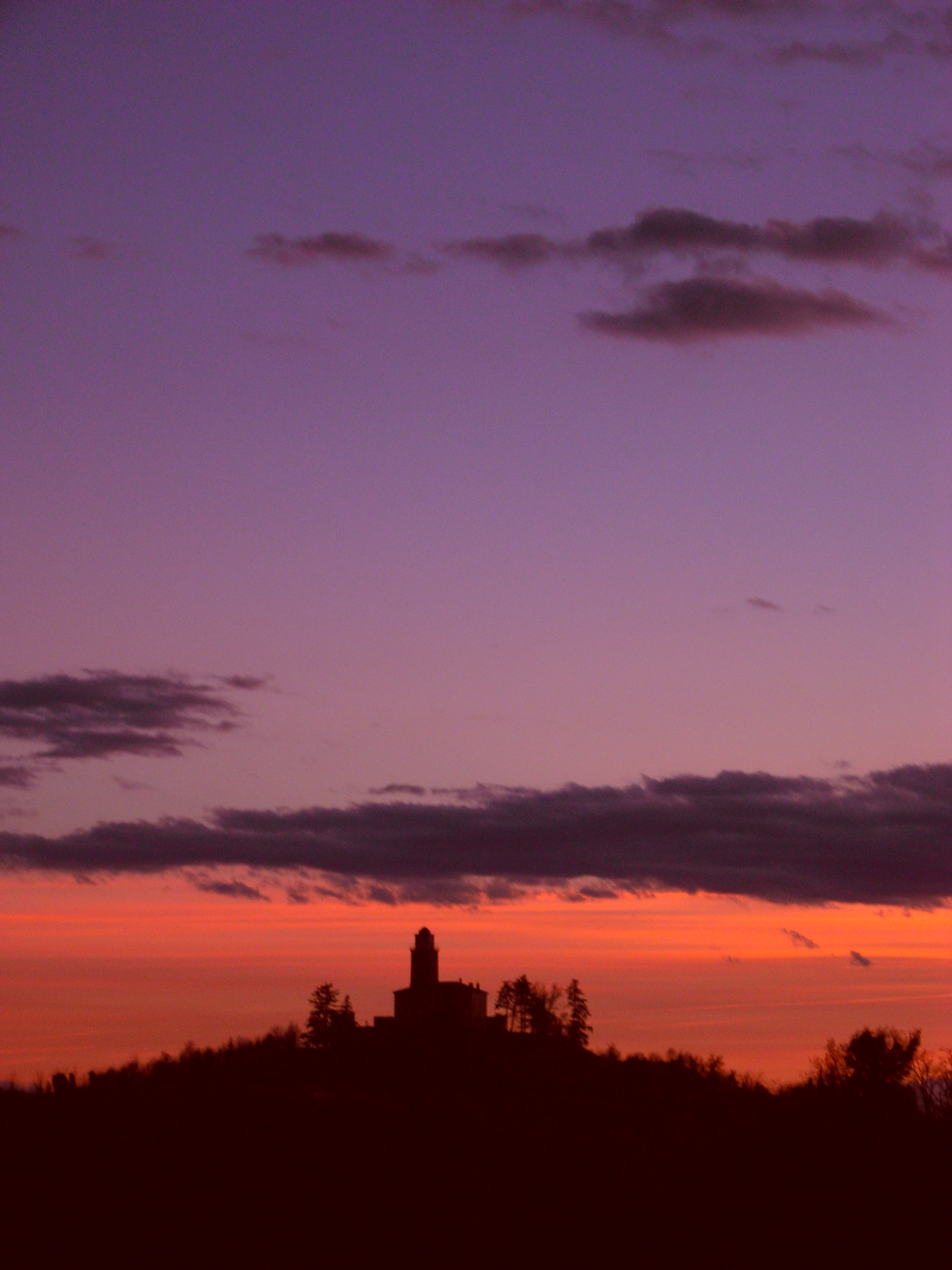
Tramonto su Montecastello

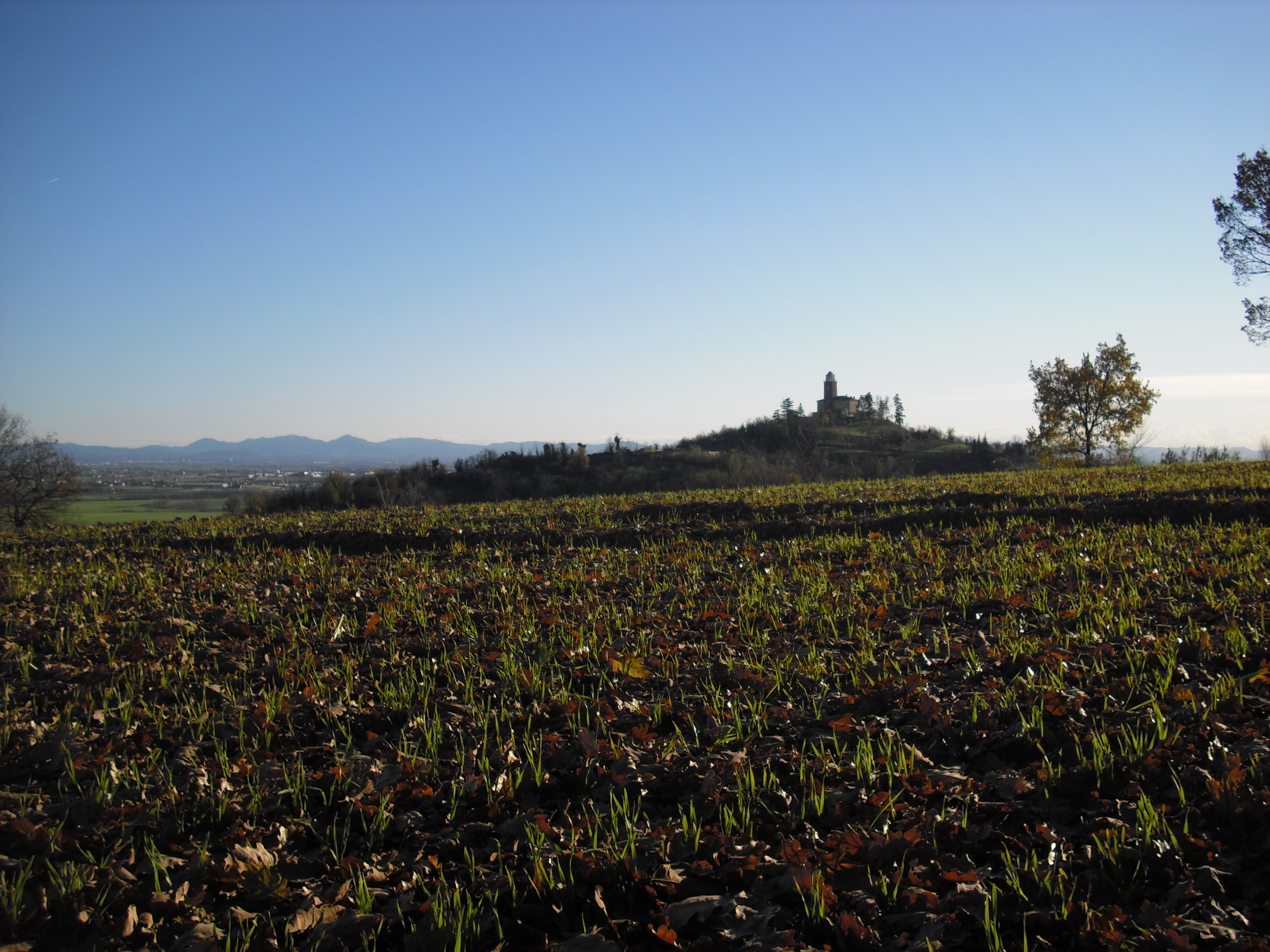
