= Rivarone =

- Comune
- Comune di Rivarone
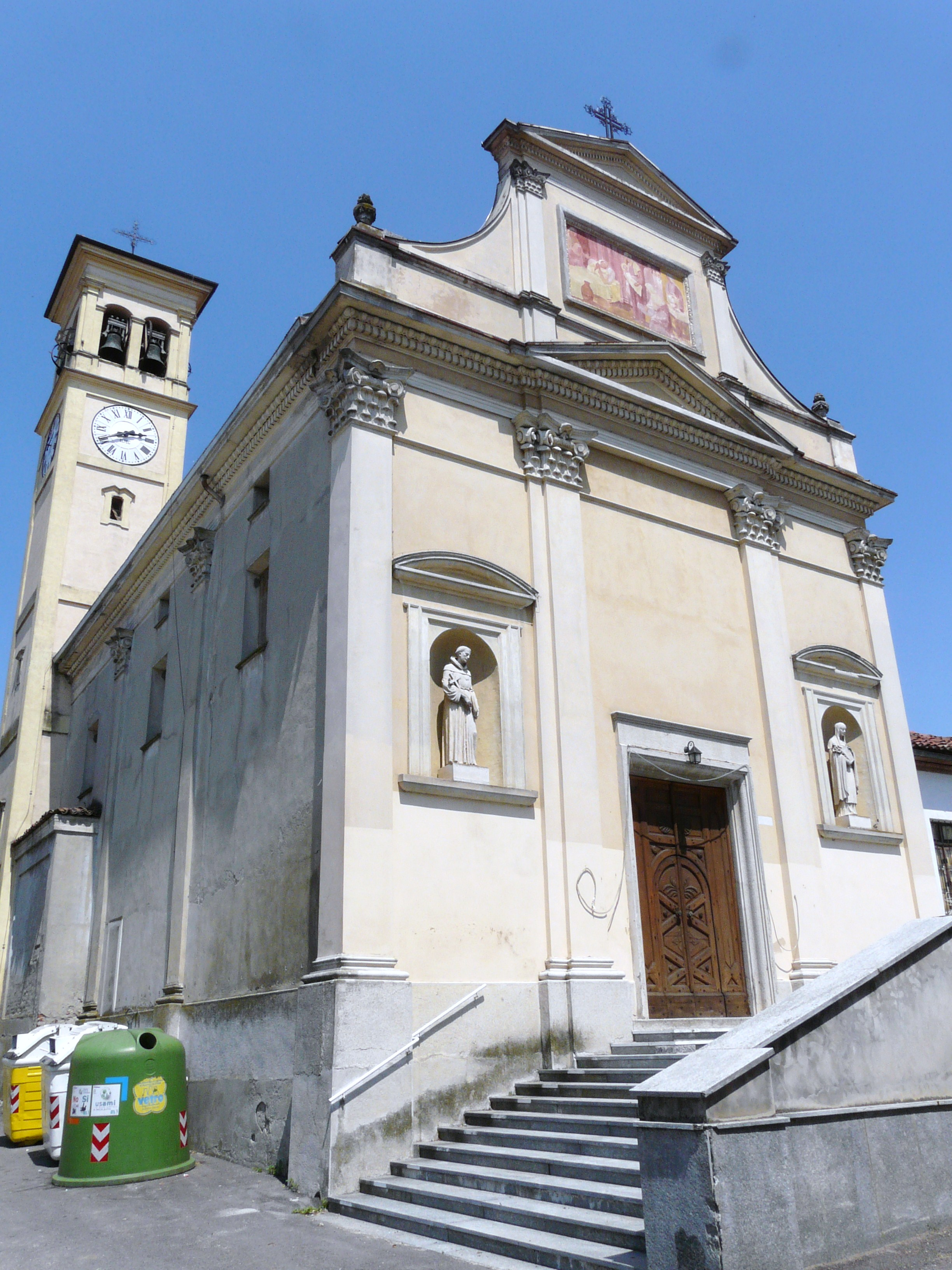

- Location within Italy Location within Piedmont
- Coordinates: 44°59′N 8°43′E
- Country: Italy
- Region: Piedmont
- Province: Alessandria (AL)

Government
  - Mayor: Elisabetta Tinello

Area
  - Total: 6.07 km^{2} (2.34 sq mi)
- Elevation: 103 m (338 ft)

Population (30 November 2017)
  - Total: 407
  - Density: 67.1/km^{2} (174/sq mi)
- Demonym: Rivaronesi
- Time zone: UTC+1 (CET)
  - Summer (DST): UTC+2 (CEST)
- Postal code: 15040
- Dialing code: 0131
- Website: Official website

Rivarone is a comune (municipality) in the Province of Alessandria in the Italian region Piedmont, located about 80 kilometres (50 mi) east of Turin and about 11 kilometres (7 mi) northeast of Alessandria. The municipality has a population of 402 residents based on the 2020 Census.

Rivarone borders the following municipalities: Alluvioni Piovera, Bassignana and Montecastello.
