= Pecetto =

Pecetto may refer to two places in the north-west Italian region Piedmont:

- Pecetto Torinese, in the Province of Turin
- Pecetto di Valenza, in the Province of Alessandria
