= Alluvioni Cambiò =

- Frazione
- Location of Alluvioni Cambiò in Italy
- Coordinates: 45°0′N 8°48′E
- Country: Italy
- Region: Piedmont
- Province: Alessandria (AL)
- Comune: Alluvioni Piovera

Area
  - Total: 9.3 km^{2} (3.6 sq mi)
- Elevation: 77 m (253 ft)

Population (31 December 2011)
  - Total: 963
  - Density: 100/km^{2} (270/sq mi)
- Demonym: Alluvionesi
- Time zone: UTC+1 (CET)
  - Summer (DST): UTC+2 (CEST)
- Postal code: 15040
- Dialing code: 0131
- Patron saint: St. Charles
- Saint day: November 4

Alluvioni Cambiò is a frazione of Alluvioni Piovera in the Province of Alessandria in the Italian region Piedmont, located about 90 kilometres (90 km) east of Turin and about 15 kilometres (9 mi) northeast of Alessandria.

The name (alluvione meaning "flood" in Italian) refers to the numerous floods which struck the area, which is nearby the confluence of the Tanaro and Po Rivers and of the Scrivia river.

== Twin towns ==
Alluvioni Cambiò is twinned with:

- Vianne, France
