= Pecetto di Valenza =

Pecetto di Valenza Apsèj (Piedmontese)
- Comune
- Comune di Pecetto di Valenza
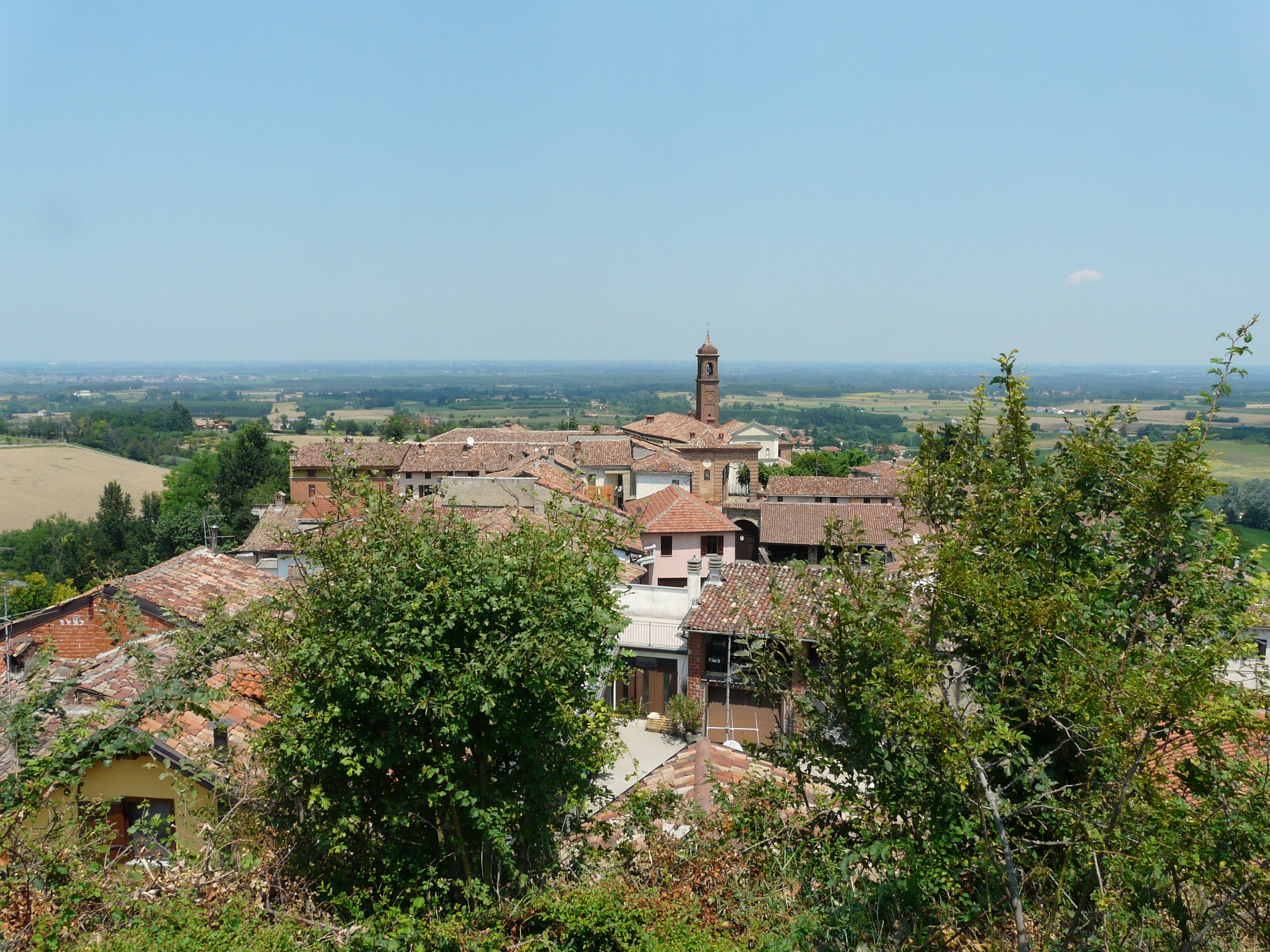

- Coat of arms

- Location within Italy Location within Piedmont
- Coordinates: 44°59′27″N 8°40′19″E
- Country: Italy
- Region: Piedmont
- Province: Alessandria (AL)
- Frazioni: Gasparini, Molina, Pellizzari

Government
  - Mayor: Flavio Vittorio De Stefani

Area
  - Total: 11.5 km^{2} (4.4 sq mi)
- Elevation: 212 m (696 ft)

Population (31 December 2008)
  - Total: 1,282
  - Density: 111/km^{2} (289/sq mi)
- Demonym: Pecettesi
- Time zone: UTC+1 (CET)
  - Summer (DST): UTC+2 (CEST)
- Postal code: 15040
- Dialing code: 0131
- Patron saint: Saint Remigius
- Saint day: First Sunday in October
- Website: www.comune.pecettodivalenza.al.it

Pecetto di Valenza (Piedmontese: Apsèj) is a commune of the Province of Alessandria in the Piedmont region of northwest Italy with a population of 1282 (December 2008 estimate). It is south of the river Po, and about 8 kilometres (5 mi) northeast of the provincial capital of Alessandria, on an eastern spur of the hills of the Basso Monferrato. The commune's neighbours are Alessandria, Bassignana, Montecastello, Pietra Marazzi, and Valenza.

The municipal boundaries enclose an area of 11.5 square kilometres (4.4 mi^{2}) that ranges in elevation from 85 to 261 metres (279 to 856 ft) above sea level and is predominantly agricultural in character: the economy is largely based on the cultivation of cereals and grapes. Four distinct settlements are identified in the Statuto comunale as "historically recognised by the community"; these were also the four designated places for the 2001 census. Pecetto di Valenza itself, which stands at 212 metres (696 ft) above sea level and is the capoluogo of the commune, was the most populous with 499 of the commune's 1,312 inhabitants. Pellizzari, at 407 metres (1,335 ft), had a population of 120. Gasperini, at 192 metres (630 ft), had 30 inhabitants and Molina, at 171 metres (561 ft), 16. A further 360 residents, 27 percent of the total, were counted in isolated dwellings such as farmhouses.

== Notable people ==
- Giuseppe Borsalino, who gave his name to the Borsalino hat-making company which he developed in Alessandria, was born in Pecetto di Valenza in 1834.
