= Piovera =

- Frazione
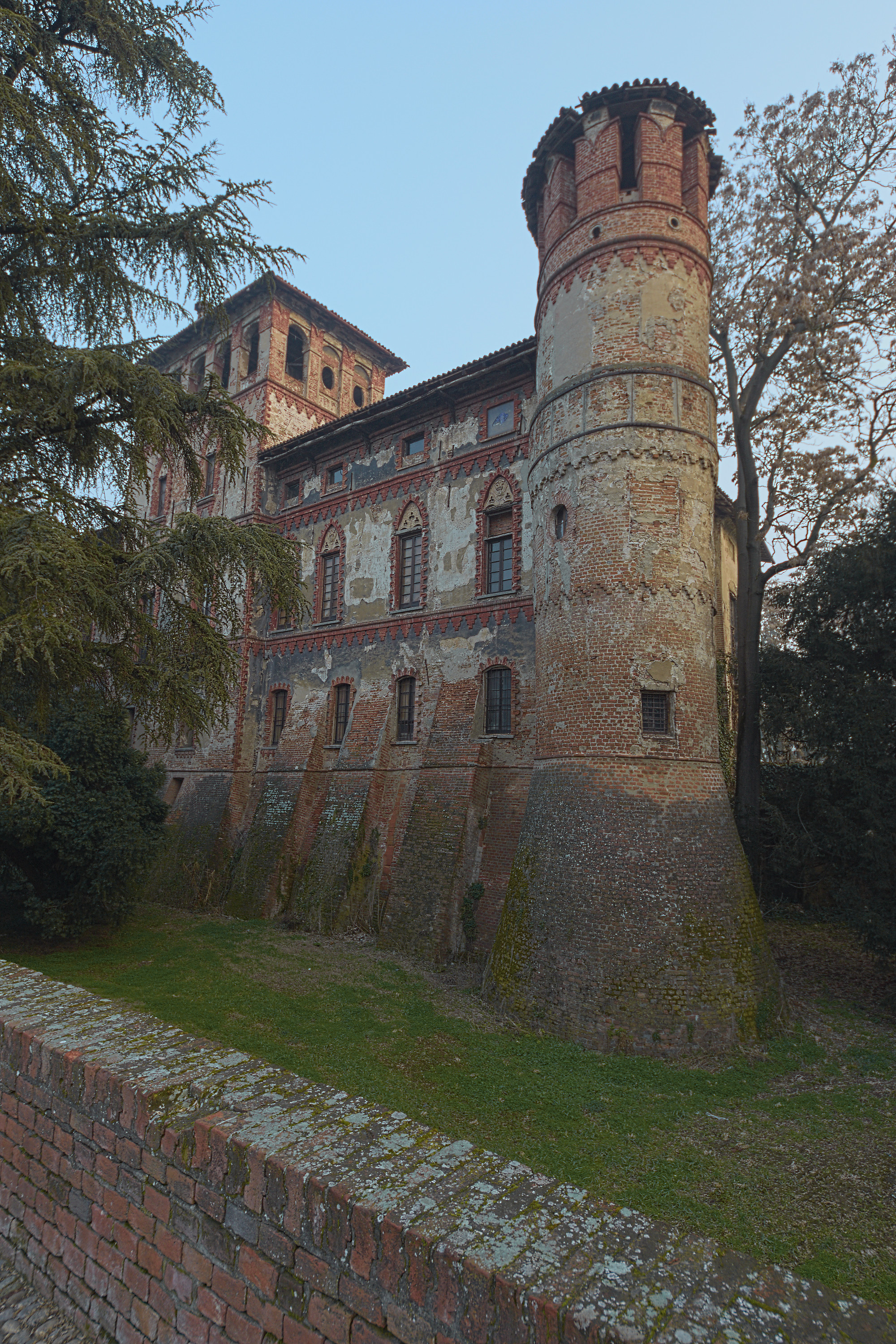

- Location of Piovera in Italy
- Coordinates: 44°57′34″N 08°44′13″E
- Country: Italy
- Region: Piedmont
- Province: Alessandria (AL)
- Comune: Alluvioni Piovera

Area
  - Total: 15.63 km^{2} (6.03 sq mi)
- Elevation: 86 m (282 ft)

Population (2005)
  - Total: 789
  - Density: 50.5/km^{2} (131/sq mi)
- Demonym: Pioverini
- Time zone: UTC+1 (CET)
  - Summer (DST): UTC+2 (CEST)
- Postal code: 15040
- Dialing code: 0131
- Saint day: September 29

Piovera is a frazione of Alluvioni Piovera in the Province of Alessandria in the Italian region Piedmont, located about 80 kilometres (50 mi) east of Turin and about 11 kilometres (7 mi) northeast of Alessandria.
