= Pietra Marazzi =

- Comune
- Comune di Pietra Marazzi
- Coat of arms

- Location within Italy Location within Piedmont
- Coordinates: 44°57′N 8°40′E
- Country: Italy
- Region: Piedmont
- Province: Alessandria (AL)
- Frazioni: Pavone

Government
  - Mayor: Gianfranco Calorio

Area
  - Total: 7.8 km^{2} (3.0 sq mi)
- Elevation: 95 m (312 ft)

Population (2010)
  - Total: 915
  - Density: 120/km^{2} (300/sq mi)
- Demonym: Pietramarazzesi
- Time zone: UTC+1 (CET)
  - Summer (DST): UTC+2 (CEST)
- Postal code: 15040
- Dialing code: 0131

Pietra Marazzi is a comune (municipality) in the Province of Alessandria in the Italian region Piedmont, located about 80 kilometres (50 mi) east of Turin and about 5 kilometres (3 mi) northeast of Alessandria.

Pietra Marazzi borders the following municipalities: Alessandria, Montecastello, and Pecetto di Valenza.
