= Alluvioni Piovera =

- Comune
- Comune di Alluvioni Piovera
- Location of Alluvioni Piovera in Italy Alluvioni Piovera (Piedmont)
- Coordinates: 45°0′N 8°48′E
- Country: Italy
- Region: Piedmont
- Province: Alessandria (AL)
- Frazioni: Alluvioni Cambiò, Piovera

Government
  - Mayor: Giuseppe Francesco Betti

Area
  - Total: 24.79 km^{2} (9.57 sq mi)

Population (31 December 2016)
  - Total: 1,733
  - Density: 69.91/km^{2} (181.1/sq mi)
- Time zone: UTC+1 (CET)
  - Summer (DST): UTC+2 (CEST)
- Postal code: 15040
- Dialing code: 0131
- Website: Official website

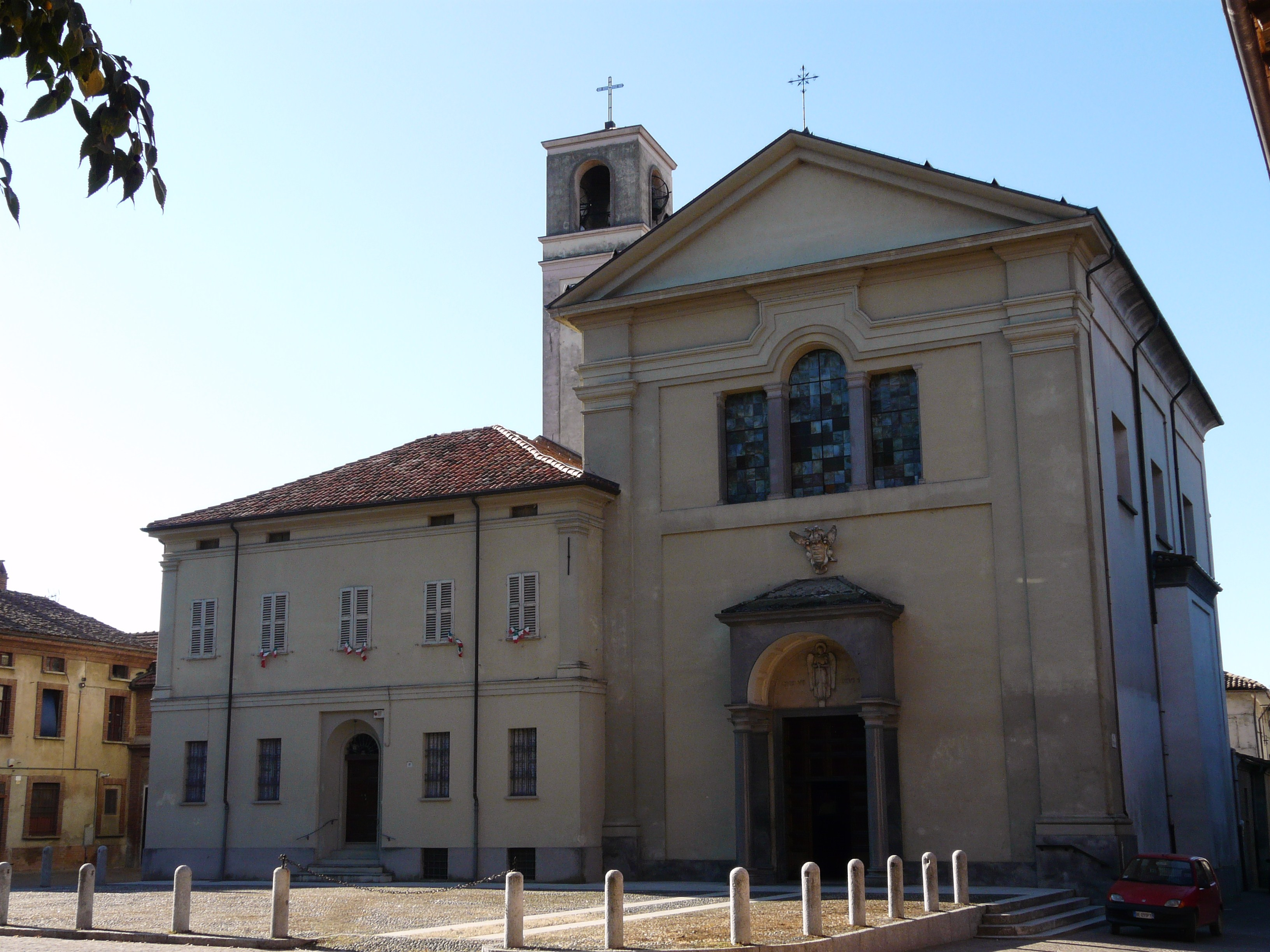
Church of San Michele Arcangelo in Piovera

Alluvioni Piovera is a comune (municipality) in the Province of Alessandria in the Italian region Piedmont.

It was established on 1 January 2018 by the merger of the municipalities of Alluvioni Cambiò and Piovera.
