= Bassignana =

- Comune
- Comune di Bassignana
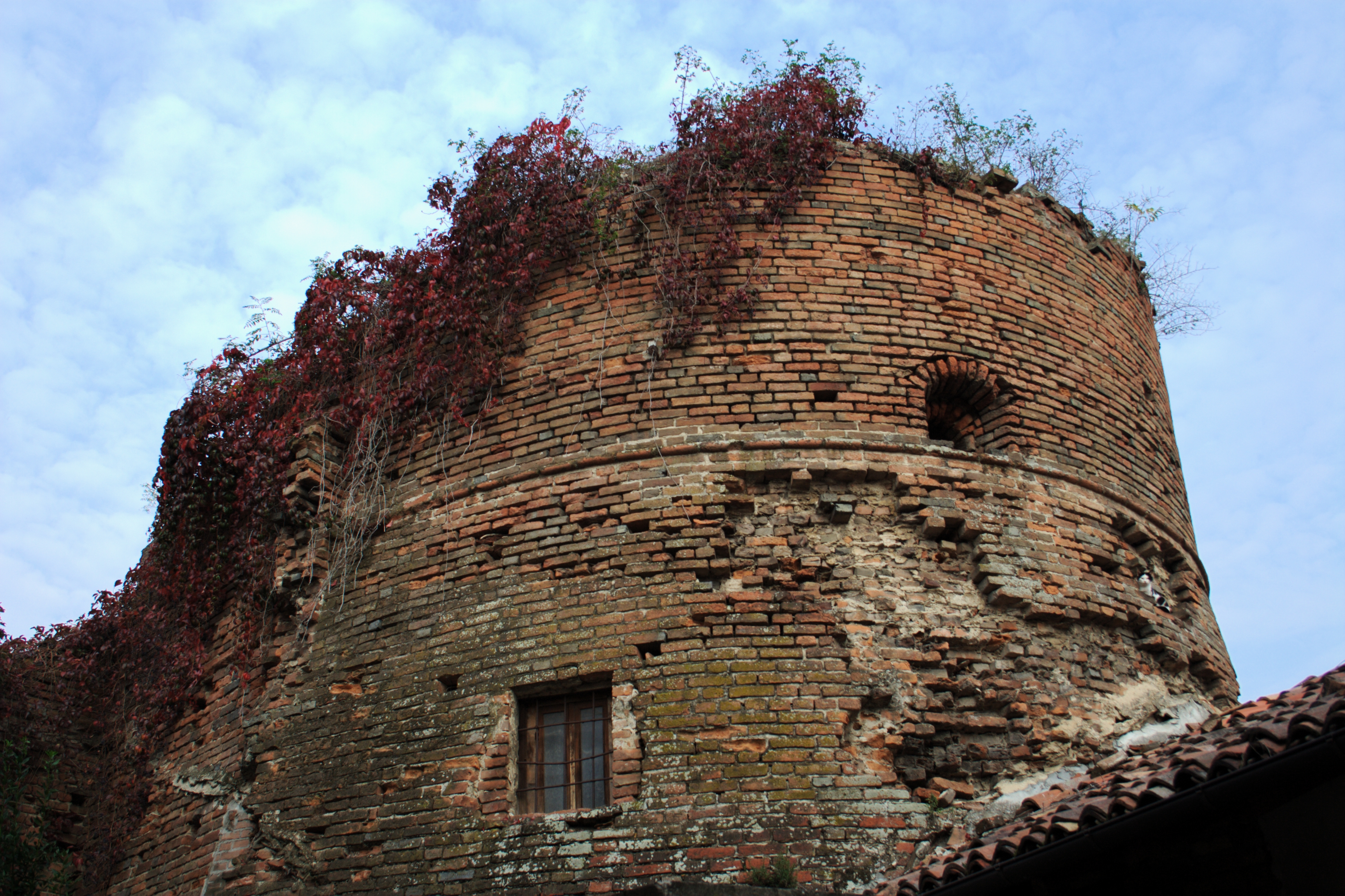
- Remains of the castle.

- Location within Italy Location within Piedmont
- Coordinates: 45°0′8″N 8°43′55″E
- Country: Italy
- Region: Piedmont
- Province: Alessandria (AL)
- Frazioni: Mugarone, Fiondi

Government
  - Mayor: Pier Paolo Barberis

Area
  - Total: 28.71 km^{2} (11.08 sq mi)
- Elevation: 96 m (315 ft)

Population (30 April 2017)
  - Total: 1,667
  - Density: 58.06/km^{2} (150.4/sq mi)
- Demonym: Bassignanesi
- Time zone: UTC+1 (CET)
  - Summer (DST): UTC+2 (CEST)
- Postal code: 15042
- Dialing code: 0131
- Patron saint: Madonna del Carmine
- Saint day: 16 July
- Website: Official website

Bassignana (in Piedmontese dialect Bassgnan-na) is a municipality in the Province of Alessandria, Piedmont, northern Italy. The village is situated near the confluence of the Po River and the Tanaro River.

Main sights include remains of the castle, dating to Lombard times, and a Romanesque pieve (10th century) with 12th century Byzantine frescoes.

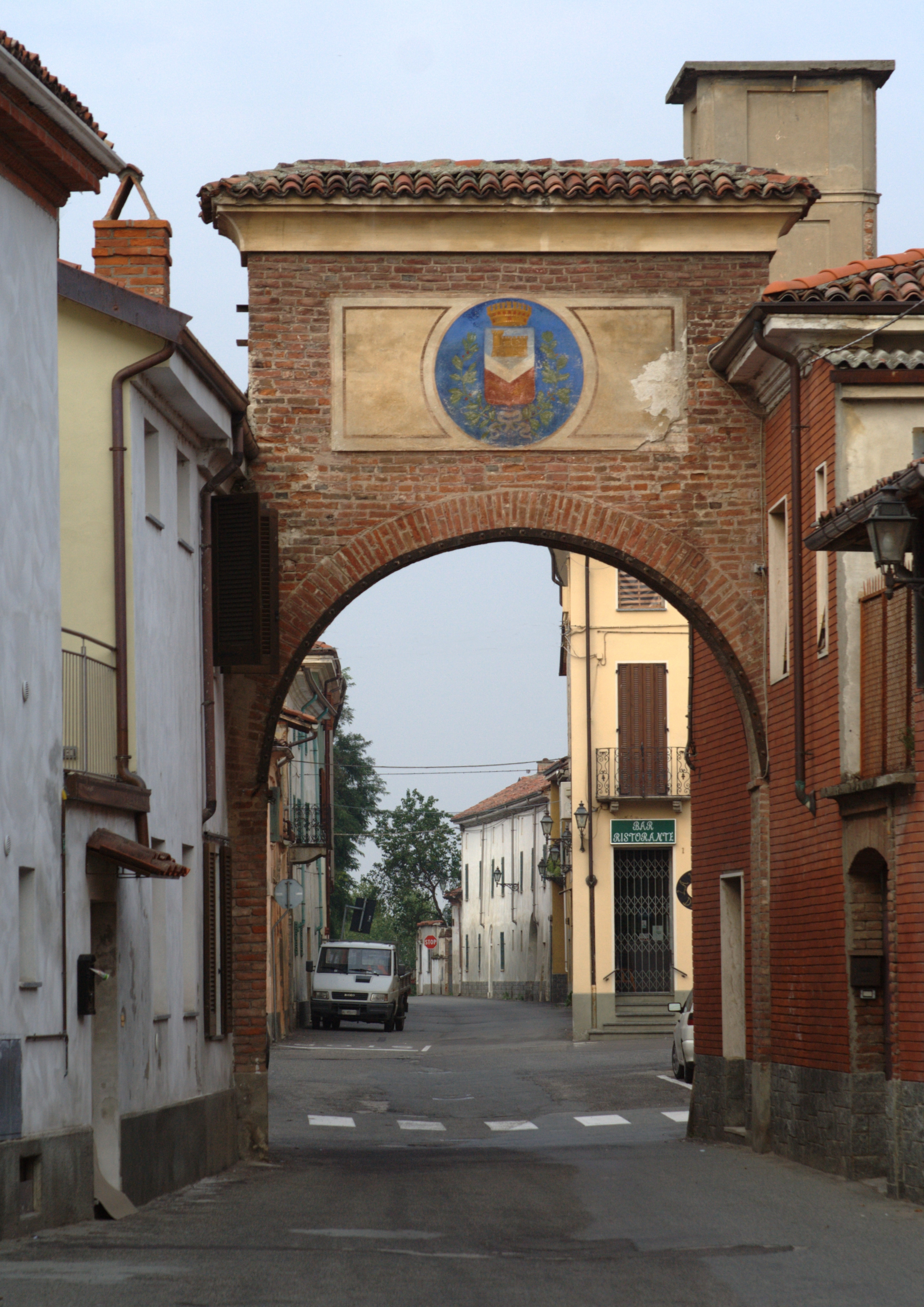
Entry gate with coat of arms

== History ==
The first inhabitants of whom there is written news belonged to the Ligurian tribe of the Marici: they had crossed the Pennine in the postglacial era and had settled south of the Po river, in the area between Stradella and Casale Monferrato. Such people were closely linked to that of the Levi, who had settled further north: the founding of Ticinum, the modern Pavia, is attributed to the Levi and to the Marici. Some toponomastic traces of that period exist in the area: Bosco Marengo stems from Lucus Maricum and Pietra Marazzi from Petra Maricorum or Mariciorum.

In the 6th century BC the Po Valley was occupied by Celtic peoples coming from the north and realistically also Bassignana had contacts and compenetrations with these peoples. In 222 BC the Roman commanders Marcus Claudius Marcellus and Gneus Cornelius Scipio conquered the whole area, which conquest was strengthened by the defeat of the Ligures in 166 BC under the consulate of Gaius Sulpicius Gallus. The toponym of the municipality dates back to that era, coming from the Roman family to whom ownership of the territory was attributed, the gens Bassinia.

After the fall of the Western Roman Empire and the barbaric incursions, Bassignana was first under the rule of the Lombards, then under that of the Franks. In the 10th century, the emperor Otto II attributed Bassignana to the jurisdiction of the bishop of Pavia, Pietro, a jurisdiction relating to the Pieve (plebs) and to the assets connected thereto. At the beginning of the 13th century the area was placed - still following the Emperor's order - under the jurisdiction of the Margrave Pallavicino, already podestà of Alessandria.

In 1350 it became part of the Duchy of Milan. After the Treaty of Utrecht (1713), it was assigned to the House of Savoy-Piedmont.

Many of its inhabitants emigrated to Memphis, in the United States, at the start of the 20th century.
