= List of municipalities of the Province of Pavia =

The following is a list of the 184 municipalities (comuni) of the Province of Pavia in the region of Lombardy in Italy.

== List ==
Municipality	Population (2026)	Area (km²)	Density
Alagna	810	8.34	97.1
Albonese	561	4.33	129.6
Albuzzano	3,667	15.45	237.3
Arena Po	1,530	22.49	68.0
Badia Pavese	408	5.06	80.6
Bagnaria	622	16.66	37.3
Barbianello	888	11.71	75.8
Bascapè	1,825	13.34	136.8
Bastida Pancarana	921	12.50	73.7
Battuda	635	7.14	88.9
Belgioioso	6,439	24.69	260.8
Bereguardo	2,856	17.86	159.9
Borgarello	2,829	4.84	584.5
Borgo Priolo	1,213	28.81	42.1
Borgo San Siro	961	17.64	54.5
Borgoratto Mormorolo	387	16.10	24.0
Bornasco	2,656	12.93	205.4
Bosnasco	624	4.84	128.9
Brallo di Pregola	473	46.15	10.2
Breme	725	18.81	38.5
Bressana Bottarone	3,482	12.69	274.4
Broni	10,164	20.85	487.5
Calvignano	112	6.98	16.0
Campospinoso Albaredo	1,333	12.45	107.1
Candia Lomellina	1,562	27.90	56.0
Canneto Pavese	1,285	5.81	221.2
Carbonara al Ticino	1,418	14.78	95.9
Casanova Lonati	452	4.63	97.6
Casatisma	855	5.48	156.0
Casei Gerola	2,307	24.81	93.0
Casorate Primo	9,190	9.74	943.5
Cassolnovo	6,747	31.74	212.6
Castana	707	5.28	133.9
Casteggio	6,363	17.66	360.3
Castelletto di Branduzzo	1,056	11.77	89.7
Castello d'Agogna	1,079	10.74	100.5
Castelnovetto	546	18.21	30.0
Cava Manara	6,684	17.26	387.3
Cecima	254	10.12	25.1
Ceranova	2,363	4.60	513.7
Ceretto Lomellina	188	7.38	25.5
Cergnago	648	13.56	47.8
Certosa di Pavia	5,623	10.86	517.8
Cervesina	1,103	12.41	88.9
Chignolo Po	4,048	23.39	173.1
Cigognola	1,308	7.88	166.0
Cilavegna	5,438	18.05	301.3
Codevilla	915	12.96	70.6
Colli Verdi	968	41.25	23.5
Confienza	1,546	26.81	57.7
Copiano	1,784	4.34	411.1
Corana	745	12.87	57.9
Cornale e Bastida	785	3.82	205.5
Corteolona e Genzone	2,572	14.09	182.5
Corvino San Quirico	960	4.37	219.7
Costa de' Nobili	358	11.82	30.3
Cozzo	358	17.61	20.3
Cura Carpignano	5,080	11.09	458.1
Dorno	4,608	30.57	150.7
Ferrera Erbognone	1,112	19.17	58.0
Filighera	812	8.25	98.4
Fortunago	367	17.83	20.6
Frascarolo	1,075	24.18	44.5
Galliavola	171	9.23	18.5
Gambarana	174	11.78	14.8
Gambolò	9,813	51.70	189.8
Garlasco	9,665	39.18	246.7
Gerenzago	1,503	5.41	277.8
Giussago	5,385	24.72	217.8
Godiasco	3,294	20.61	159.8
Golferenzo	162	4.42	36.7
Gravellona Lomellina	2,696	20.34	132.5
Gropello Cairoli	4,362	26.22	166.4
Inverno e Monteleone	1,493	9.64	154.9
Landriano	6,551	15.59	420.2
Langosco	365	15.82	23.1
Lardirago	1,163	5.34	217.8
Linarolo	2,797	13.17	212.4
Lomello	2,010	22.36	89.9
Lungavilla	2,407	6.82	352.9
Magherno	1,798	5.25	342.5
Marcignago	2,455	10.12	242.6
Marzano	1,804	9.29	194.2
Mede	6,102	32.89	185.5
Menconico	326	28.14	11.6
Mezzana Bigli	1,061	19.02	55.8
Mezzana Rabattone	457	7.06	64.7
Mezzanino	1,405	12.51	112.3
Miradolo Terme	3,909	9.56	408.9
Montalto Pavese	926	20.82	44.5
Montebello della Battaglia	1,437	15.74	91.3
Montecalvo Versiggia	478	11.40	41.9
Montescano	439	2.40	182.9
Montesegale	239	14.97	16.0
Monticelli Pavese	662	20.19	32.8
Montù Beccaria	1,642	15.49	106.0
Mornico Losana	605	8.30	72.9
Mortara	15,934	51.97	306.6
Nicorvo	288	8.08	35.6
Olevano di Lomellina	723	15.38	47.0
Oliva Gessi	163	3.91	41.7
Ottobiano	1,083	24.98	43.4
Palestro	1,895	18.81	100.7
Pancarana	331	6.10	54.3
Parona	1,858	9.30	199.8
Pavia	71,811	63.24	1,135.5
Pietra de' Giorgi	777	11.20	69.4
Pieve Albignola	792	18.15	43.6
Pieve del Cairo	1,802	25.11	71.8
Pieve Porto Morone	2,730	16.40	166.5
Pinarolo Po	1,654	11.31	146.2
Pizzale	670	7.09	94.5
Ponte Nizza	740	22.96	32.2
Portalbera	1,480	4.48	330.4
Rea	395	2.16	182.9
Redavalle	1,050	5.42	193.7
Retorbido	1,511	11.67	129.5
Rivanazzano Terme	5,150	28.91	178.1
Robbio	6,016	40.54	148.4
Robecco Pavese	510	6.93	73.6
Rocca de' Giorgi	37	10.50	3.5
Rocca Susella	239	12.76	18.7
Rognano	708	9.36	75.6
Romagnese	528	29.72	17.8
Roncaro	1,533	5.05	303.6
Rosasco	560	19.55	28.6
Rovescala	810	8.41	96.3
San Cipriano Po	455	8.50	53.5
San Damiano al Colle	600	6.43	93.3
San Genesio ed Uniti	4,053	9.27	437.2
San Giorgio di Lomellina	986	25.45	38.7
San Martino Siccomario	6,666	14.29	466.5
San Zenone al Po	576	6.89	83.6
Sannazzaro de' Burgondi	5,230	23.33	224.2
Sant'Alessio con Vialone	1,058	6.56	161.3
Sant'Angelo Lomellina	803	10.50	76.5
Santa Cristina e Bissone	1,848	22.42	82.4
Santa Giuletta	1,585	11.59	136.8
Santa Margherita di Staffora	424	36.90	11.5
Santa Maria della Versa	2,275	18.48	123.1
Sartirana Lomellina	1,491	29.54	50.5
Scaldasole	853	11.57	73.7
Semiana	192	9.72	19.8
Silvano Pietra	622	13.67	45.5
Siziano	6,921	11.79	587.0
Sommo	1,117	14.87	75.1
Spessa	567	12.23	46.4
Stradella	11,729	18.84	622.6
Suardi	573	9.85	58.2
Torrazza Coste	1,602	16.23	98.7
Torre Beretti e Castellaro	489	17.66	27.7
Torre d'Arese	942	4.49	209.8
Torre d'Isola	2,497	16.44	151.9
Torre de' Negri	332	4.01	82.8
Torrevecchia Pia	3,539	16.50	214.5
Torricella Verzate	796	3.63	219.3
Travacò Siccomario	4,427	17.05	259.6
Trivolzio	2,494	3.83	651.2
Tromello	3,772	35.50	106.3
Trovo	1,000	8.16	122.5
Val di Nizza	571	29.68	19.2
Valeggio	192	9.85	19.5
Valle Lomellina	2,229	27.24	81.8
Valle Salimbene	1,425	7.16	199.0
Varzi	3,073	57.61	53.3
Velezzo Lomellina	82	8.17	10.0
Vellezzo Bellini	3,528	8.20	430.2
Verretto	380	2.71	140.2
Verrua Po	1,213	11.44	106.0
Vidigulfo	6,821	16.14	422.6
Vigevano	63,480	81.37	780.1
Villa Biscossi	68	4.88	13.9
Villanova d'Ardenghi	762	6.61	115.3
Villanterio	3,441	14.77	233.0
Vistarino	1,595	9.49	168.1
Voghera	40,220	63.44	634.0
Volpara	131	3.77	34.7
Zavattarello	881	28.40	31.0
Zeccone	1,717	5.53	310.5
Zeme	983	24.58	40.0
Zenevredo	481	5.40	89.1
Zerbo	407	6.36	64.0
Zerbolò	1,714	37.19	46.1
Zinasco	3,191	29.74	107.3

== See also ==
- List of municipalities of Lombardy
- List of municipalities of Italy
