= Campospinoso Albaredo =

- Comune
- Comune di Campospinoso Albaredo
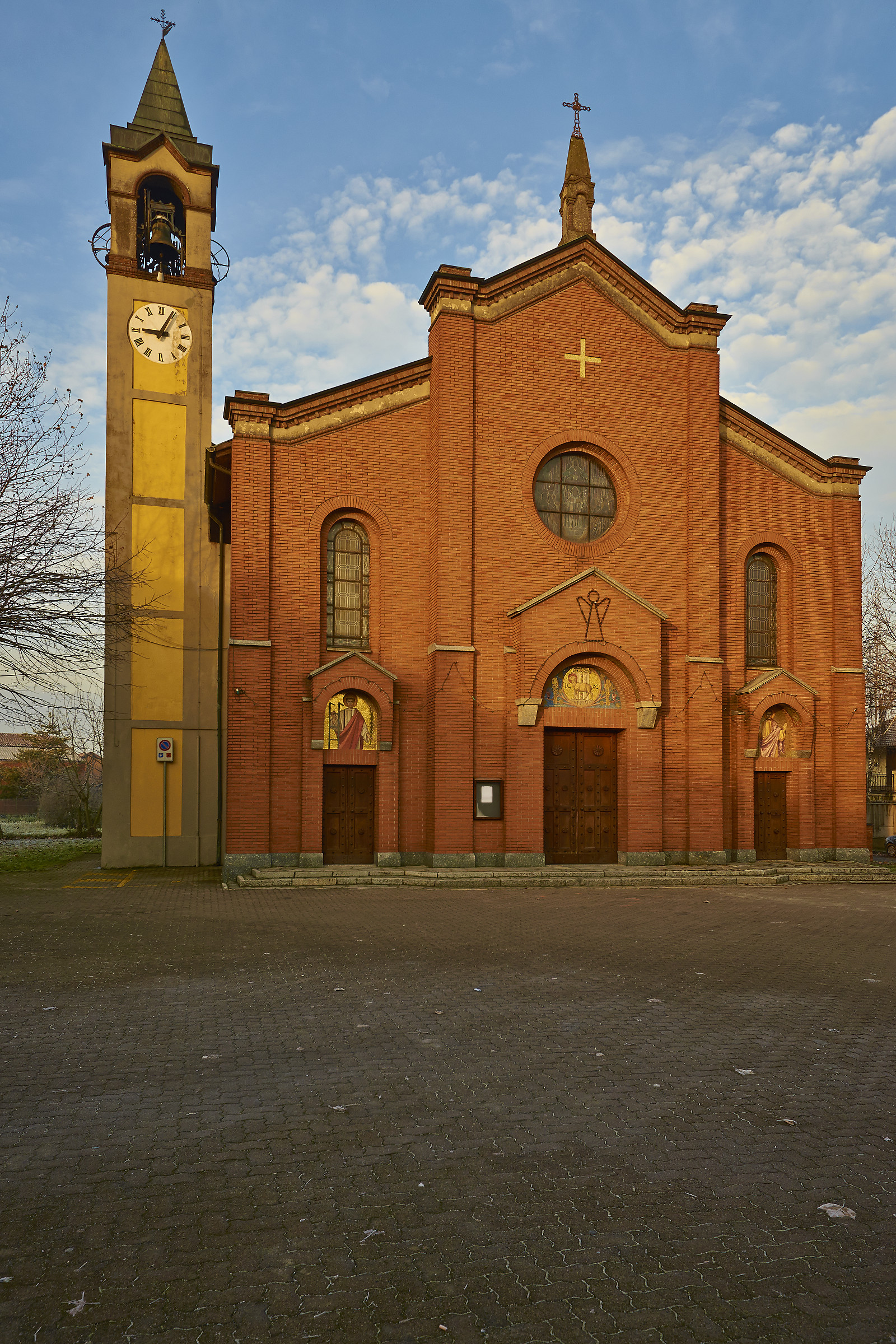
- Santi Lorenzo e Giuseppe church in Campospinoso

- Location within Italy Location within Lombardy
- Coordinates: 45°5′47″N 9°14′44″E
- Country: Italy
- Region: Lombardy
- Province: Pavia

Government
  - Mayor: Olga Volpin

Area
  - Total: 3.69 km^{2} (1.42 sq mi)
- Elevation: 64 m (210 ft)

Population (1 January 2023)
  - Total: 1,092
  - Density: 296/km^{2} (766/sq mi)
- Time zone: UTC+1 (CET)
  - Summer (DST): UTC+2 (CEST)
- Postal code: 27040
- Dialing code: 0385
- Website: Official website

Campospinoso Albaredo is a comune located in the province of Pavia, in the region of Lombardy in northern Italy. It was established in November 2023 from the merger of Campospinoso and Albaredo Arnaboldi. It is located about 12 km (7.5 mi) southeast of the provincial capital of Pavia.

== Geography ==
Campospinoso Albaredo is located in the Oltrepò Pavese on the south bank of the Po, just east of its junction with the Ticino. It borders the comuni of Linarolo to the north, Belgioioso to the northeast, San Cipriano Po to the east, Broni to the southeast, Barbianello to the south, Casanova Lonati to the southwest, and Mezzanino to the northwest.

== History ==
The place names Albaredo and Campospinoso first appear in historical records in 973 and 1250 respectively.

The comuni of Campospinoso and Albaredo Arnaboldi were first merged to form the comune of Campospinoso Albaredo in 1928, but the merger was undone in 1948. From September 2000 onward, the two comuni were governed by a single municipal union, the Unione Campospinoso Albaredo. The citizens of Campospinoso and Albaredo Arnaboldi voted to re-merge the two comuni on 20 November 2022. The Regional Council of Lombardy published the law effecting the merger on 14 November 2023, which went into effect on 18 November 2023.

== Economy and infrastructure ==
Until the end of the 1980s, the local economy was dominated by agriculture; since then, handicrafts and commerce have gained in importance.

State highway 617 runs north to south through the comune, connecting it with Pavia to the north via the Ponte della Becca, and with Stradella and the A21 motorway to the south.
