= Milena Quaglini =

Italian murderess (1957–2001_

- Born: 25 March 1957; Mezzanino, Italy
- Died: 16 October 2001 (aged 44); Vigevano, Italy
- Conviction: Died before trial

Details
- Victims: 3
- Span of crimes: 1995–1999
- Country: Italy
- States: Veneto, Lombardy

Milena Quaglini (25 March 1957 – 16 October 2001) was an Italian woman, who in the late 1990s murdered three men who sexually assaulted her.

== Biography ==
Quaglini was born in 1957 in Mezzanino, near Broni in the Oltrepò Pavese.

After graduating as an accountant in Pavia, at 19 she ran away from home to live between Como and Lodi, working occasionally as a cashier, caregiver and cleaning lady. She married and had a son, but her husband became seriously ill with fulminant diabetes and died, causing her to fall into a depression that would accompany her throughout her life, and also began to drink. Quaglini moved to live in Travacò Siccomario, and after finding a job in San Martino Siccomario, she met Mario Fogli, who would become her second husband. He proved to be an obsessive, closed and jealous alcoholic who occasionally worked as a truck driver. Both Mario and Milena were also activists for the Lega Nord. Quaglini had two daughters from him, but when the bailiffs arrived at their house for an attachment of assets because of the husband's debts, she decided to separate from him and move to Este, with her second daughter. In Veneto, she worked as a concierge for a gym.

The money wasn't enough, so Quaglini found work as a caregiver for an elderly gentleman, 83-year-old Giusto Dalla Pozza, who lent her 4 million lires and then tried to blackmail her. On 25 October 1995, Dalla Pozza told Milena that she could repay him 500,000 lire for a month or pay him in another way. When she refused, he tried to rape her. A scuffle broke out, in which Quaglini struck him on the head with a lamp. She then left the house and left the agonized Dalla Pozza, who was still alive, calling an ambulance. He died ten days later. Milena was accused of this murder, and instead was filed as an accidental fall until her confession. For this reason, she was sentenced to 20 months imprisonment due to excessive legitimate defence.

Quaglini returned to Broni in an attempt to reconcile with her former husband Mario Fogli; but the quarrels started again, with Milena returning to drinking and taking antidepressants. On 2 August 1998, after another quarrel, in a state of strong drunkenness, she killed her husband: she waited for him to fall asleep, put the two girls in bed, then snatched a rope from a shutter and wrapped it around Mario's neck to scare him. This resulted in a scuffle in which Fogli tried in vain to overwhelm her. Quaglini hit him with jewellery box and then strangled him with the shutter rope. She then wrapped her husband's body in the bloodstained blankets and then in a carpet, which she put on the balcony. At 4 pm, she called the Carabinieri of Stradella, saying she had killed her husband: the Carabinieri kept her on the phone while she told them the address. After she gave the phone to her daughters, they said with certainty that the carpet with the body was on the balcony. Milena was arrested, and for this murder was sentenced to six years and eight months, also selling her house because her sentence was reduced due to her semi-insanity. Quaglini was sent to a recovery community for alcoholics, but after a few months she started drinking again. She was taken into a new community, where she met a former carabiniere named Salvatore, who offered her hospitality, but tried to rape her two days later.

Quaglini met Angelo Porrello through an announcement. On 5 October 1999, she killed him in his home in Bascapè after he told her to dress provocatively, which she refused to do. He then slapped her and proceeded to rape her three times. After the situation subsided, in the early afternoon she prepared a coffee for him, dissolving 20 tranquilizer tablets into it. Porrello fell asleep, and then Milena moved his body into the bathtub, filling it with water. She returned a few hours later to check on him, and he had drowned. In the evening, she moved the corpse to the garden. Drugs found in the home and DNA traces brought her to confess after Quaglini was arrested in Porrello's car and returned to prison. On 20 October, two weeks after the murder, the corpse was discovered in an advanced stage of decomposition.

Condemned to serve her sentence in the Vigevano Prison, Quaglini tried to overcome her depression by resuming her passion for painting, but she eventually hanged herself with a bed sheet on 16 October 2001. She was found still alive by a guard at 1:50 am, but she died in the Emergency Room at 2:15 am.

The story of Milena Quaglini had a dedicated episode on La linea d'ombra with Massimo Picozzi on Rai 2, where her story was compared to that of American serial killer Aileen Wuornos, a prostitute who killed seven clients in Florida. In March 2015, Sky Crime dedicated the first episode of Profondo Nero with Carlo Lucarelli to the story of Milena Quaglini. On 7 April 2016, Rai 3 aired the fourth episode of the fourth season of Black Stars conceived and conducted by Marco Marra, dedicated to Milena Quaglini.

== Victims ==
- Giusto Dalla Pozza, 83, died in Este on 4 November 1995, following his injuries
- Mario Fogli, 52, killed on 2 August 1998, in Broni
- Angelo Porrello, 53 years old, was killed on 5 October 1999, in Bascapè

== See also ==
- List of serial killers by country
