= Campospinoso =

- Comune
- Comune di Campospinoso
- Church of Sts. Lorenzo and Giuseppe

- Location within Italy Location within Lombardy
- Coordinates: 45°6′N 9°15′E
- Country: Italy
- Region: Lombardy
- Province: Pavia (PV)

Area
  - Total: 3.7 km^{2} (1.4 sq mi)
- Elevation: 64 m (210 ft)

Population (Dec. 2004)
  - Total: 800
  - Density: 220/km^{2} (560/sq mi)
- Demonym: Campospinosini
- Time zone: UTC+1 (CET)
  - Summer (DST): UTC+2 (CEST)
- Postal code: 27040
- Dialing code: 0385
- Website: Official website

Campospinoso is a former comune (municipality) in the Province of Pavia in the Italian region Lombardy, located about 50 km (31 mi) south of Milan and about 12 km (7.5 mi) southeast of Pavia. It merged with the municipality of Albaredo Arnaboldi in November 2023 to form the new municipality of Campospinoso Albaredo.

Campospinoso bordered the municipalities of Albaredo Arnaboldi, Barbianello, and Broni.
