= Albaredo =

Albaredo may refer to:

- Albaredo Arnaboldi, municipality in the Province of Pavia in the Italian region Lombardy
- Albaredo d'Adige, municipality in the Province of Verona in the Italian region Veneto
- Albaredo per San Marco, municipality in the Province of Sondrio in the Italian region Lombardy
