= Verrua =

Verrua may refer to:

- Verrua Po, a comune in Lombardy, northern Italy
- Verrua Savoia, a comune in Piedmont, northern Italy
