= Daniele Bosone =

Italian politician and neurologist (born 1962)

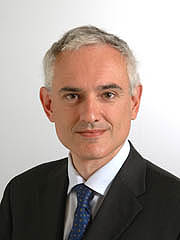

President of the Province of Pavia
- In office 1 June 2011 – 29 August 2016
- Preceded by: Vittorio Poma
- Succeeded by: Vittorio Poma

Senator of the Republic
- In office 28 April 2006 – 14 March 2013
- Constituency: Lombardy

Personal details
- Born: 4 December 1962 (age 63) Pavia, Italy
- Party: Democratic Party
- Education: University of Pavia
- Occupation: Neurologist

Daniele Bosone (born 4 December 1962) is an Italian politician and neurologist. A member of the Democratic Party, he served as a senator of the Republic from 2006 to 2013 and as president of the Province of Pavia from 2011 to 2016. He also served as a member of the Pavia City Council and municipal assessor from 1988 to 2000.
