= Pinarolo Po =

- Comune
- Comune di Pinarolo Po
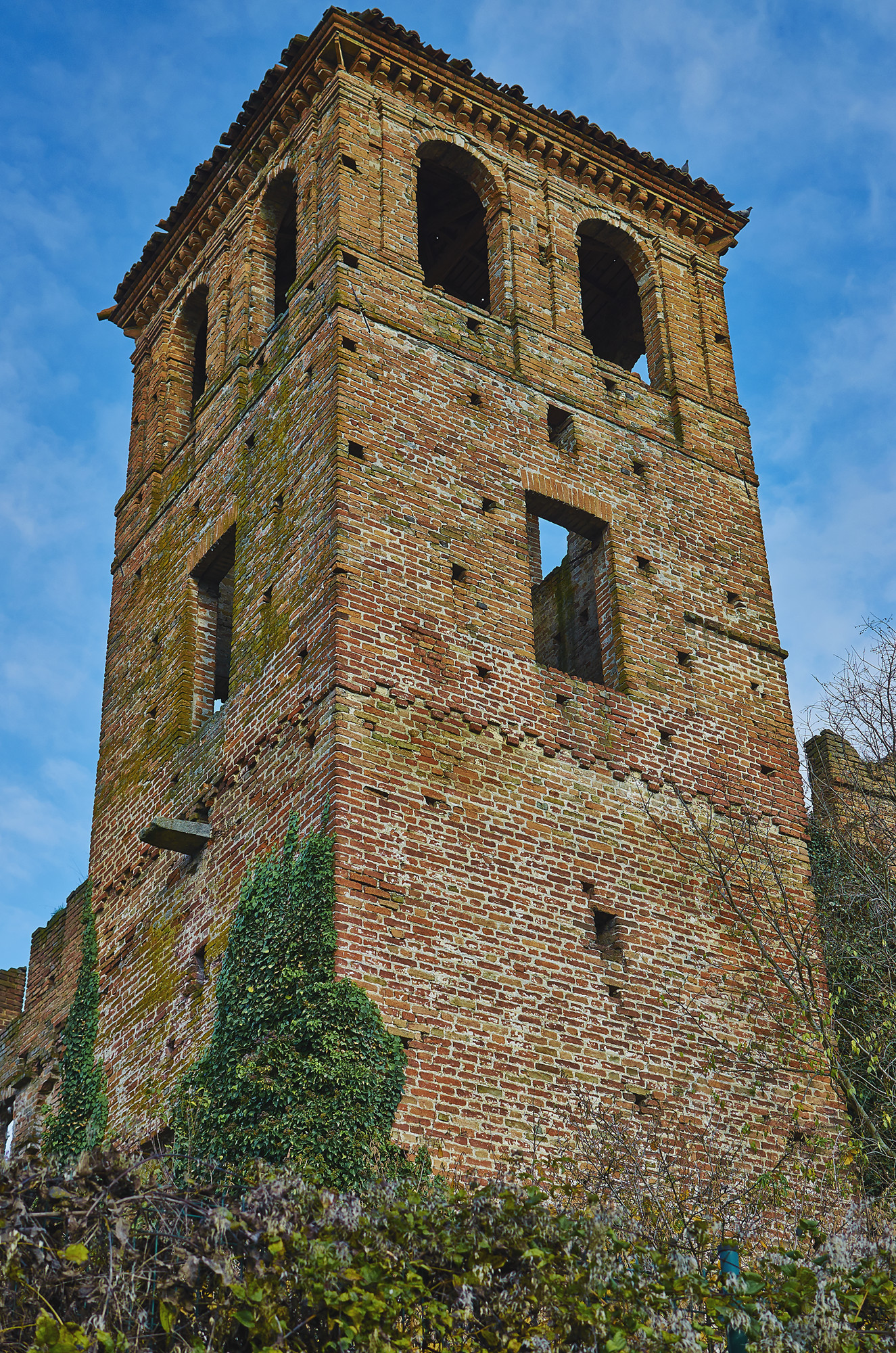

- Location within Italy Location within Lombardy
- Coordinates: 45°4′N 9°12′E
- Country: Italy
- Region: Lombardy
- Province: Province of Pavia (PV)

Government
  - Mayor: Cinzia Carmen Gazzaniga

Area
  - Total: 11.31 km^{2} (4.37 sq mi)
- Elevation: 67 m (220 ft)

Population (31 December 2010)
  - Total: 1,730
  - Density: 153/km^{2} (396/sq mi)
- Demonym: Pinarolesi
- Time zone: UTC+1 (CET)
  - Summer (DST): UTC+2 (CEST)
- Postal code: 27040
- Dialing code: 0383
- Website: Official website

Pinarolo Po is a comune (municipality) in the Province of Pavia in the Italian region Lombardy, located about 45 km south of Milan and about 14 km southeast of Pavia.

Pinarolo Po borders the following municipalities: Barbianello, Bressana Bottarone, Casanova Lonati, Robecco Pavese, Santa Giuletta, Verrua Po.
