= Rea, Lombardy =

Rea
- Comune
- Comune di Rea
- Location within Italy Location within Lombardy
- Coordinates: 45°7′N 9°9′E
- Country: Italy
- Region: Lombardy
- Province: Province of Pavia (PV)

Area
  - Total: 3.0 km^{2} (1.2 sq mi)
- Elevation: 63 m (207 ft)

Population (Dec. 2004)
  - Total: 462
  - Density: 150/km^{2} (400/sq mi)
- Demonym: Reesi
- Time zone: UTC+1 (CET)
  - Summer (DST): UTC+2 (CEST)
- Postal code: 27040
- Dialing code: 0385

Rea is a comune (municipality) in the Province of Pavia in the Italian region Lombardy, located about 40 km (25 mi) south of Milan and about 7 km (4.3 mi) south of Pavia. As of 31 December 2004, it had a population of 462 and an area of 3.0 km^{2} (1.2 sq mi).

Rea borders the following municipalities: Bressana Bottarone, Cava Manara, Travacò Siccomario, Verrua Po.

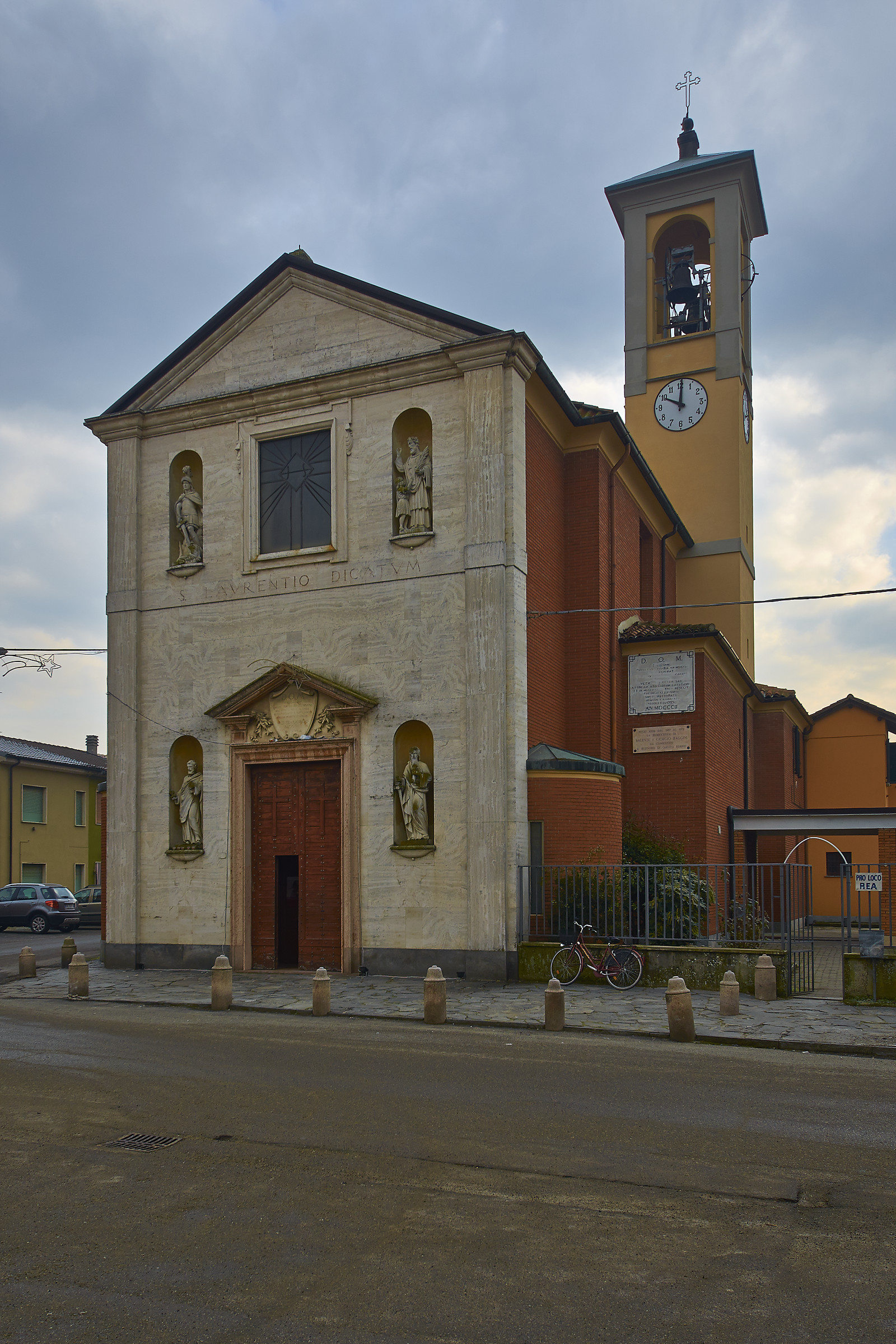
Rea, Province of Pavia, Lombardy, Italy

== Demographic evolution ==
Historical population

Year	Pop.	±%
1861	818	—
1871	875	+7.0%
1881	890	+1.7%
1901	851	−4.4%
1911	969	+13.9%

Year	Pop.	±%
1921	931	−3.9%
1931	905	−2.8%
1936	1,156	+27.7%
1951	837	−27.6%
1961	777	−7.2%

Year	Pop.	±%
1971	678	−12.7%
1981	613	−9.6%
1991	564	−8.0%
2001	498	−11.7%

Source: Data from ISTAT
