= Mezzana =

Mezzana may refer to several Italian towns:

- Mezzana, Trentino a municipality in Trentino
- Mezzana Bigli in the province of Pavia
- Mezzana Mortigliengo in Piedmont
- Mezzana Rabattone in the province of Pavia
- Mezzana, Corsica, natural region of Corsica
