= San Marco, Vigevano =

Abandoned church in Pavia province, Italy

Coordinates: 45°17′22.4″N 08°49′30.0″E

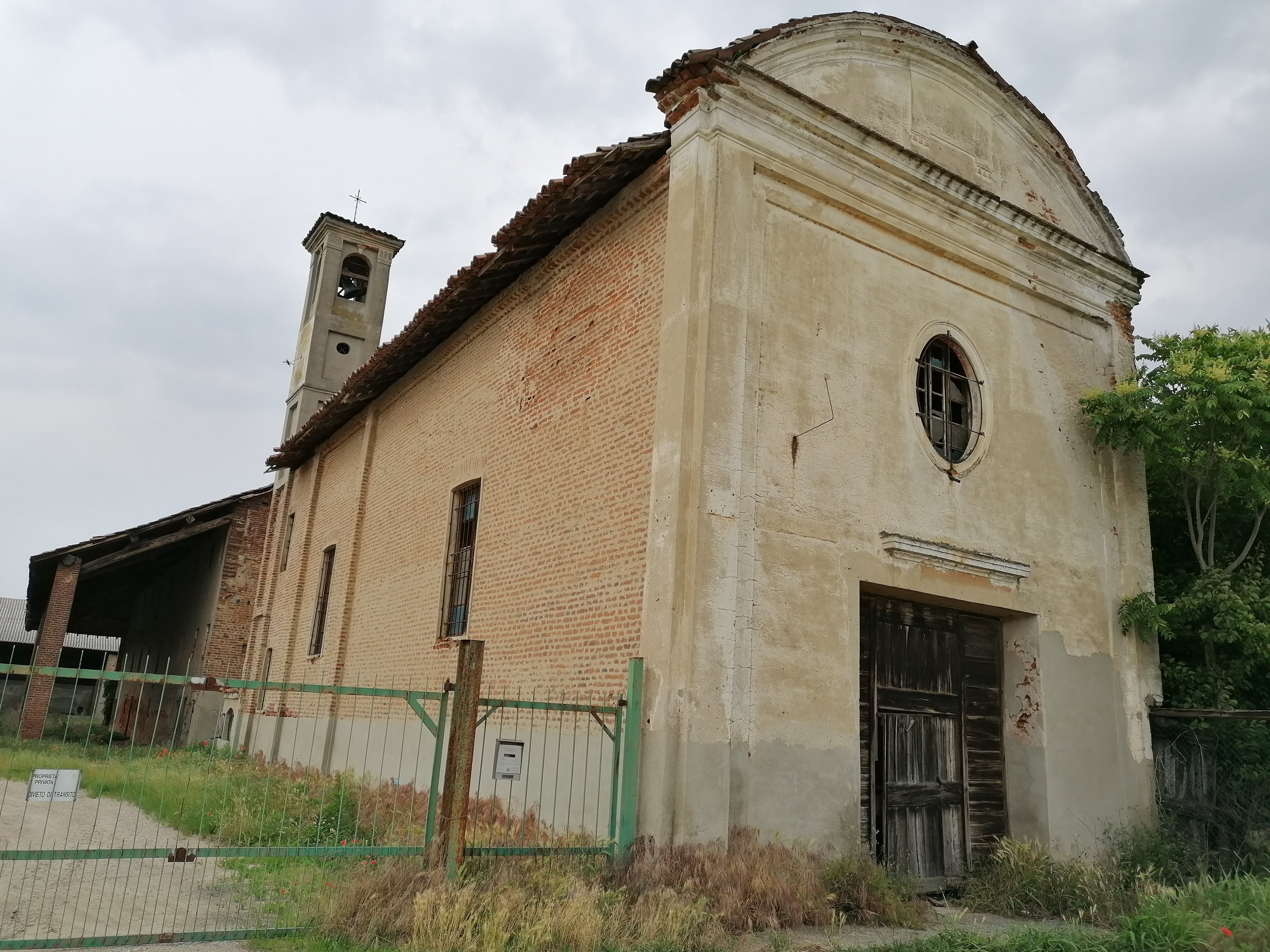
The church.

The Church of San Marco is a religious building located in Vigevano, Italy, in the diocese of Vigevano.

== History ==
The church is located in the locality of Cascina San Marco. It took its name from an ancient church, perhaps from the early Middle Ages, which belonged to the Templars, located near a mill on the Terdoppio. In 1515 the old church, then crumbling, was replaced by one incorporated into the farmhouse. In 1743 the church was again close to ruin. In 1806 Mrs. Bolognara, widow Borgnis, had it rebuilt; in the same year the capitular vicar Tornaghi blessed it.

Little frequented, since the 19th century its use has become increasingly rare, following the abandonment of the farmhouse. It was closed after 1930 and used as a warehouse. In 2020 it was damaged by vandals and, subsequently, part of the roof collapsed.
