= Bastida Pancarana =

- Comune
- Comune di Bastida Pancarana
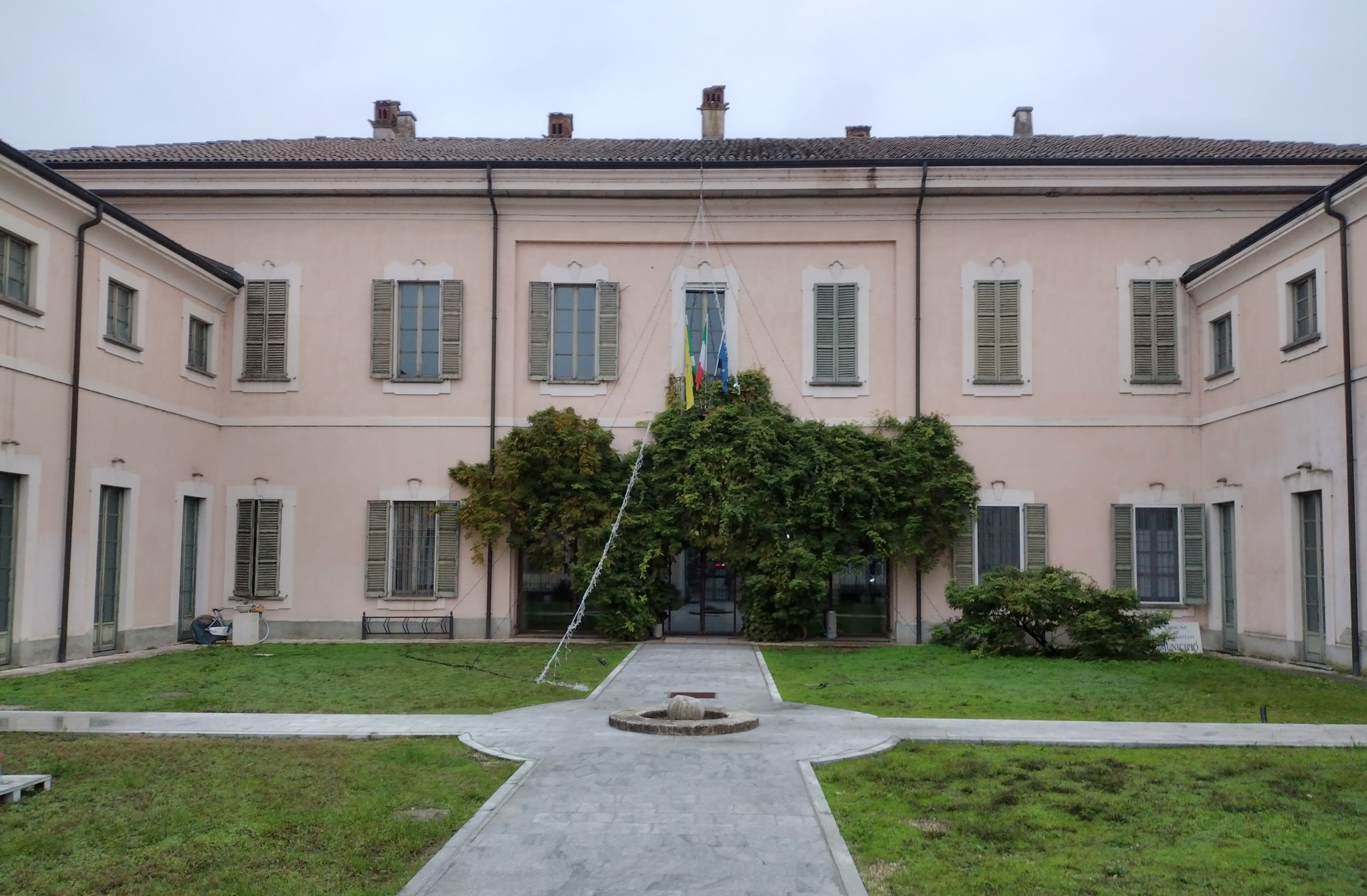
- View of Bastida Pancarana

- Coat of arms

- Location within Italy Location within Lombardy
- Coordinates: 45°5′N 9°3′E
- Country: Italy
- Region: Lombardy
- Province: Pavia (PV)

Government
  - Mayor: Davide Calcanti

Area
  - Total: 13.4 km^{2} (5.2 sq mi)

Population (Dec. 2004)
  - Total: 944
  - Density: 70.4/km^{2} (182/sq mi)
- Demonym: Bastidesi
- Time zone: UTC+1 (CET)
  - Summer (DST): UTC+2 (CEST)
- Postal code: 27050
- Dialing code: 0383

Bastida Pancarana is a comune (municipality) in the Province of Pavia in the Italian region Lombardy, located about 45 km (28 mi) south of Milan and about 14 km (8.7 mi) southwest of Pavia in the Oltrepò Pavese traditional region.

Bastida Pancarana borders the following municipalities: Bressana Bottarone, Castelletto di Branduzzo, Cava Manara, Mezzana Rabattone, Pancarana, Sommo, Zinasco.

== Demographic evolution ==
Historical population

Year	Pop.	±%
1861	1,438	—
1871	1,566	+8.9%
1881	1,630	+4.1%
1901	1,516	−7.0%
1911	1,489	−1.8%

Year	Pop.	±%
1921	1,296	−13.0%
1931	1,235	−4.7%
1936	1,233	−0.2%
1951	1,261	+2.3%
1961	1,292	+2.5%

Year	Pop.	±%
1971	1,131	−12.5%
1981	1,061	−6.2%
1991	969	−8.7%
2001	894	−7.7%

Source: Data from ISTAT
