= Albaredo Arnaboldi =

Albaredo Arnaboldi Albaréd (Lombard)
- Comune
- Comune di Albaredo Arnaboldi
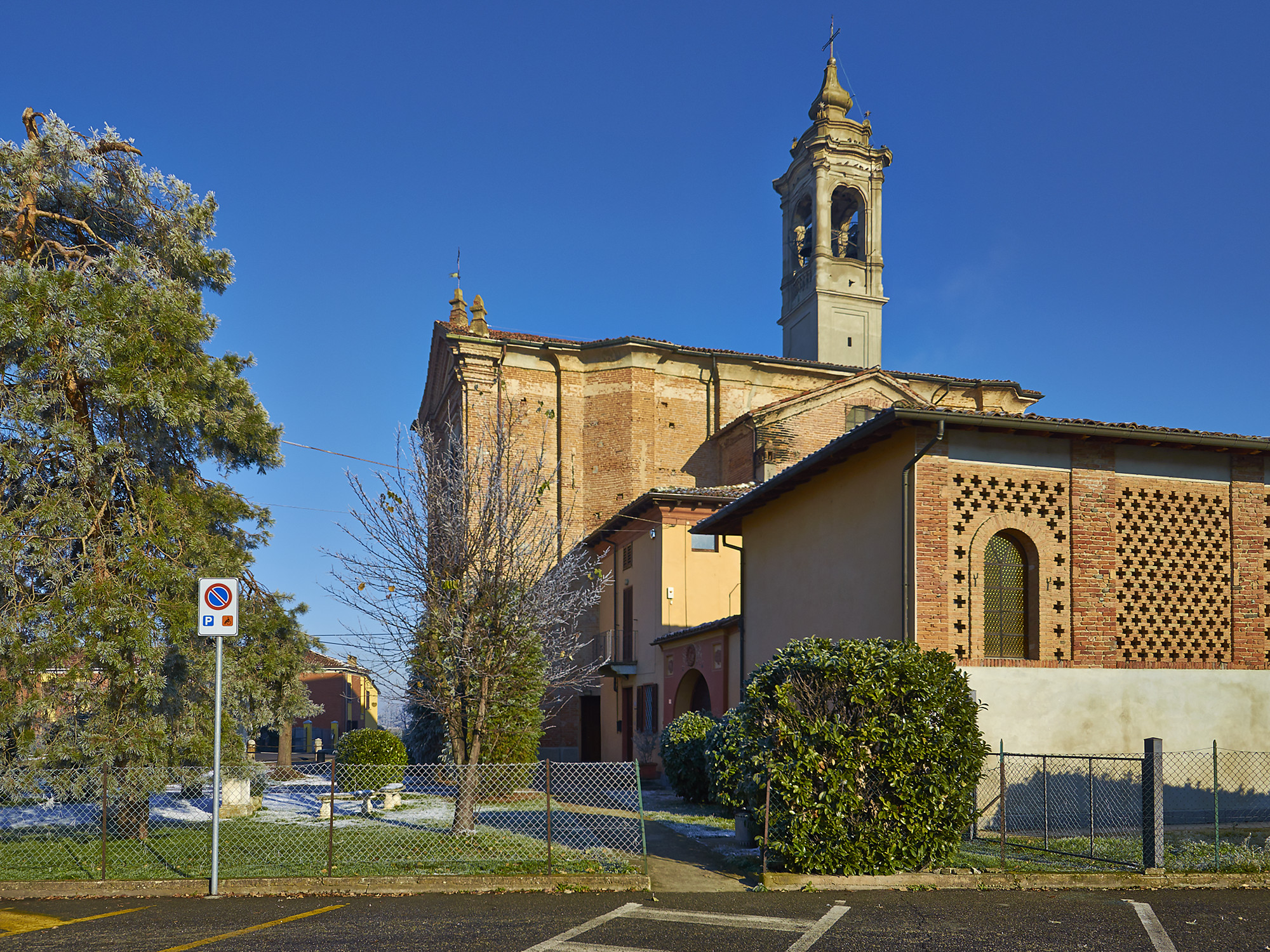
- Chiesa di San Giovanni Battista

- Location of Albaredo Arnaboldi in Italy Albaredo Arnaboldi (Lombardy)
- Coordinates: 45°6′N 9°15′E
- Country: Italy
- Region: Lombardy
- Province: Pavia (PV)

Area
  - Total: 9.2 km^{2} (3.6 sq mi)
- Elevation: 77 m (253 ft)

Population (Dec. 2004)
  - Total: 200
  - Density: 22/km^{2} (56/sq mi)
- Demonym: Albaredesi
- Time zone: UTC+1 (CET)
  - Summer (DST): UTC+2 (CEST)
- Postal code: 27040
- Dialing code: 0385

Albaredo Arnaboldi (Lombard: Albaréd) was a former comune (municipality) in the Province of Pavia in the Italian region of Lombardy, located about 40 km (25 mi) south of Milan and about 12 km (7.5 mi) southeast of Pavia. It merged with the municipality of Campospinoso in November 2023 to form the new municipality of Campospinoso Albaredo.

Albaredo Arnaboldi bordered the following municipalities: Barbianello, Belgioioso, Broni, Campospinoso, Casanova Lonati, Linarolo, Mezzanino, San Cipriano Po.
