= Vaux-en-Bugey =

Commune in Auvergne-Rhône-Alpes, France

- Commune
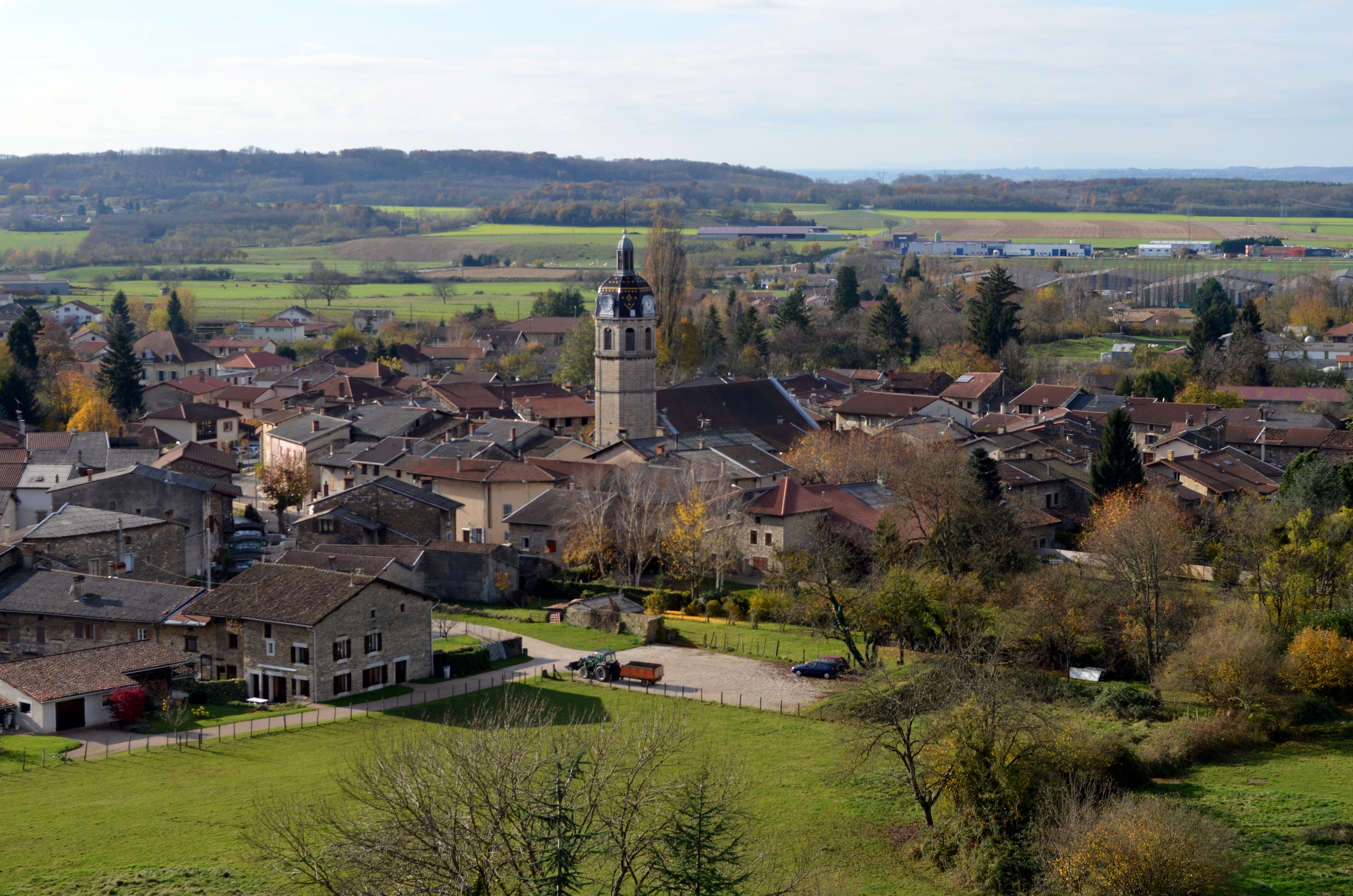

- Coat of arms
- Location of Vaux-en-Bugey
- Location within France Location within Auvergne-Rhône-Alpes
- Coordinates: 45°55′00″N 5°21′00″E
- Country: France
- Region: Auvergne-Rhône-Alpes
- Department: Ain
- Arrondissement: Belley
- Canton: Ambérieu-en-Bugey
- Intercommunality: Plaine de l'Ain

Government
  - Mayor (2026–32): Françoise Veysset-Rabilloud
- Area^{1}: 8.22 km^{2} (3.17 sq mi)
- Elevation: 277 m (909 ft)
- Highest elevation: 681 m (2,234 ft)
- Lowest elevation: 252 m (827 ft)
- Population (2023): 1,201
  - Density: 146/km^{2} (378/sq mi)
- Time zone: UTC+01:00 (CET)
  - Summer (DST): UTC+02:00 (CEST)
- INSEE/Postal code: 01431 /01150
- ^{1} French Land Register data, which excludes lakes, ponds, glaciers > 1 km^{2} (0.386 sq mi or 247 acres) and river estuaries.

Vaux-en-Bugey (French pronunciation: [vo ɑ̃ byʒɛ], lit. 'Vaux in Bugey') is a commune in the Ain department in eastern France.

== Population ==
Historical population
Year	Pop.	±% p.a.
1968	738	—
1975	762	+0.46%
1982	798	+0.66%
1990	881	+1.24%
1999	1,003	+1.45%
2007	1,103	+1.20%
2012	1,200	+1.70%
2017	1,224	+0.40%
2023	1,201	−0.32%
Source: INSEE

== Twin towns ==
Vaux-en-Bugey is twinned with:

- Redavalle, Italy

== See also ==
- Communes of the Ain department
