= Giovanni Palli =

Italian politician (born 1981)

President of the Province of Pavia
- Incumbent
- Assumed office 22 December 2021
- Preceded by: Vittorio Poma

Mayor of Varzi
- Incumbent
- Assumed office 27 May 2019
- Preceded by: Gianfranco Alberti

Personal details
- Born: 26 June 1981 (age 45) Varzi, Lombardy, Italy
- Party: Lega

Giovanni Palli (born 26 June 1981) is an Italian politician serving as president of the Province of Pavia since 2021. He has served as mayor of Varzi since 2019.

In December 2021, Palli, supported by the centre-right coalition, was elected president of the Province of Pavia, defeating Angelo Bargigia by 36,435 weighted votes to 36,174. He was re-elected in December 2025, defeating Matteo Pedrazzoli with 56,545 weighted votes.
