= List of presidents of the Province of Pavia =

President of the Province of Pavia
- Presidente della Provincia di Pavia
- Incumbent; Giovanni Palli since 20 December 2021
- Term length: 4 years
- Inaugural holder: Emilio Pellegrini
- Formation: 1889

The president of the Province of Pavia is the head of the provincial government in Pavia, Lombardy, Italy. The president oversees the administration of the province, coordinates the activities of the municipalities, and represents the province in regional and national matters.

Since December 2021, the office has been held by Giovanni Palli of Lega.

== List ==
=== Presidents of the Provincial Deputation (1889–1927) ===
No.	Portrait	Name	Term of office		Party
No.	Portrait	Name	Start	End	Party
1		Emilio Pellegrini	1889	1898	
2		Ferdinando Albertario	1899	1919 ?	

=== Presidents of the Province (1951–present) ===
No.	Portrait	Name	Term of office		Party
No.	Portrait	Name	Start	End	Party
–		?	?	?	?
		Luigi Panigazzi	1972	1978	Italian Socialist Party
		?	?	?	?
		Tullio Montagna	16 October 1988	25 June 1993	Italian Communist Party; Democratic Party of the Left
		Enzo Casali	25 June 1993	12 May 1997	Lega Nord
		Silvio Beretta	12 May 1997	21 May 2001	Forza Italia
		Silvio Beretta	21 May 2001	30 May 2006	Forza Italia
		Vittorio Poma	30 May 2006	1 June 2011	Forza Italia; The People of Freedom
		Daniele Bosone	1 June 2011	29 August 2016	Democratic Party
		Vittorio Poma	29 August 2016	22 December 2021	Forza Italia
		Giovanni Palli	22 December 2021	21 December 2025	Lega
		Giovanni Palli	21 December 2025	Incumbent	Lega

== Sources ==
- "Storia amministrativa dell'ente". Ministero dell'Interno.
- Menichini, Piera (2005). "I presidenti delle Province dall'Unità alla Grande guerra: repertorio analitico". Storia Amministrazione Costituzione (13): 272–274.
