= Terdoppio =

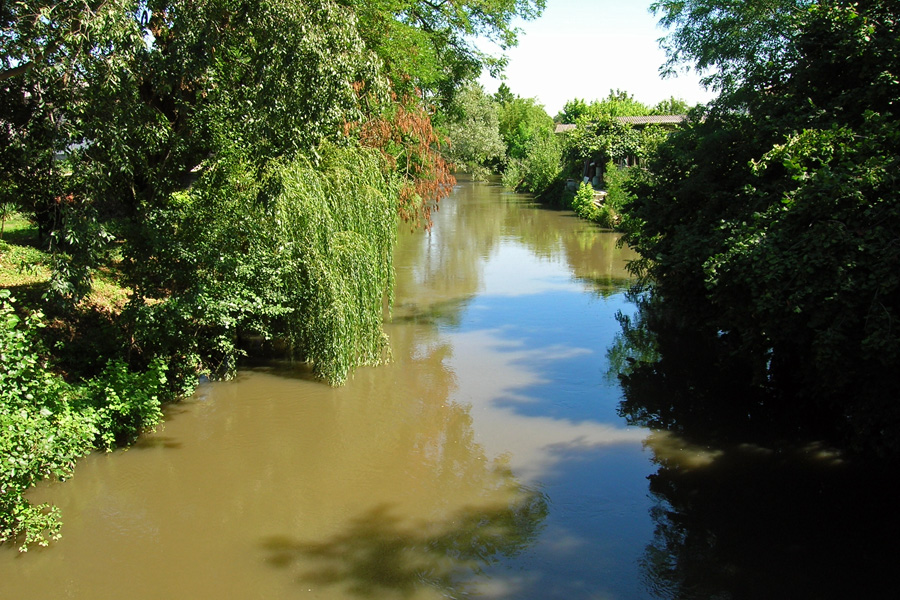
- The torrente Terdoppio at Tromello

Location
- Country: Italy

Physical characteristics
- Source
  - location: Piedmontese Prealps
- Mouth
  - location: Ticino; Po, near Zinasco
  - coordinates: 45.1082°N 9.0770°E
- Length: 86 km (53 mi)
- Basin size: 515 km^{2} (199 sq mi)
- Discharge
  - average: 3.7 m^{3}/s (130 cu ft/s)

Basin features
- Progression: Po→ Adriatic Sea

The Terdoppio is a river of Piedmont and Lombardy (northern Italy). It starts from the Piedmontese Prealps in the area between Lake Orta and Lake Maggiore, and then crosses the province of Novara. Near Cerano, it splits into two different streams: the first joins the Ticino River, while the second flows through the Lomellina (province of Pavia) until it merges with the Po River.

The Terdoppio is 86 kilometres (53 mi) long, with an average discharge of 3.7 cubic metres per second (130 cu ft/s) and a drainage basin of about 515 square kilometres (199 mi^{2}).
