= Cava Manara =

- Comune
- Comune di Cava Manara
- Coat of arms

- Location within Italy Location within Lombardy
- Coordinates: 45°8′N 9°6′E
- Country: Italy
- Region: Lombardy
- Province: Pavia (PV)
- Frazioni: Gerre Chiozzo, Mezzana Corti, Torre de' Torti, Tre Re

Government
  - Mayor: Michele Pini

Area
  - Total: 17.26 km^{2} (6.66 sq mi)
- Elevation: 79 m (259 ft)

Population (30 June 2017)
  - Total: 6,784
  - Density: 393.0/km^{2} (1,018/sq mi)
- Demonym: Cavesi
- Time zone: UTC+1 (CET)
  - Summer (DST): UTC+2 (CEST)
- Postal code: 27051
- Dialing code: 0382
- Patron saint: St. Augustine
- Website: Official website

Cava Manara is a comune (municipality) in the province of Pavia in the Italian region Lombardy, located about 35 km south of Milan and about 7 km southwest of Pavia, not far from the confluence of the Ticino and the Po rivers.

The comune is named after Luciano Manara, an Italian patriot.

Cava Manara borders the following municipalities: Bastida Pancarana, Bressana Bottarone, Carbonara al Ticino, Rea, San Martino Siccomario, Sommo, Travacò Siccomario, Zinasco.

== History ==
Cava Taverna is known since the 13th century. Historically belonging to Lomellina, it was renamed Cava Manara in 1863, and in 1871 it absorbed the suppressed communes of Torre de' Torti and Gerrechiozzo.
