= Valle Salimbene =

- Comune
- Comune di Valle Salimbene
- Location within Italy Location within Lombardy
- Coordinates: 45°10′N 9°14′E
- Country: Italy
- Region: Lombardy
- Province: Province of Pavia (PV)

Area
  - Total: 7.1 km^{2} (2.7 sq mi)

Population (Dec. 2004)
  - Total: 1,368
  - Density: 190/km^{2} (500/sq mi)
- Time zone: UTC+1 (CET)
  - Summer (DST): UTC+2 (CEST)
- Postal code: 27010
- Dialing code: 0382

Valle Salimbene is a comune (municipality) in the Province of Pavia in the Italian region Lombardy, located about 35 km (22 mi) south of Milan and about 7 km (4.3 mi) southeast of Pavia. As of 31 December 2004, it had a population of 1,368 and an area of 7.1 km^{2} (2.7 sq mi).

Valle Salimbene borders the following municipalities: Albuzzano, Cura Carpignano, Linarolo, Pavia, Travacò Siccomario.

== Demographic evolution ==
Historical population

Year	Pop.	±%
1861	654	—
1871	683	+4.4%
1881	718	+5.1%
1901	676	−5.8%
1911	526	−22.2%

Year	Pop.	±%
1921	517	−1.7%
1931	566	+9.5%
1936	561	−0.9%
1951	666	+18.7%
1961	882	+32.4%

Year	Pop.	±%
1971	927	+5.1%
1981	1,140	+23.0%
1991	1,251	+9.7%
2001	1,353	+8.2%

Source: Data from ISTAT
