= San Cipriano Po =

- Comune
- Comune di San Cipriano Po
- Location within Italy Location within Lombardy
- Coordinates: 45°6′N 9°15′E
- Country: Italy
- Region: Lombardy
- Province: Province of Pavia (PV)

Area
  - Total: 8.7 km^{2} (3.4 sq mi)

Population (Dec. 2004)
  - Total: 435
  - Density: 50/km^{2} (130/sq mi)
- Time zone: UTC+1 (CET)
  - Summer (DST): UTC+2 (CEST)
- Postal code: 27043
- Dialing code: 0385

San Cipriano Po is a comune (municipality) in the Province of Pavia in the Italian region Lombardy, located about 40 km (25 mi) south of Milan and about 12 km (7.5 mi) southeast of Pavia. As of 31 December 2004, it had a population of 435 and an area of 8.7 km^{2} (3.4 sq mi).

San Cipriano Po borders the following municipalities: Albaredo Arnaboldi, Belgioioso, Broni, Spessa, Stradella.

== Demographic evolution ==
Historical population

Year	Pop.	±%
1861	944	—
1871	975	+3.3%
1881	995	+2.1%
1901	920	−7.5%
1911	976	+6.1%

Year	Pop.	±%
1921	905	−7.3%
1931	834	−7.8%
1936	819	−1.8%
1951	725	−11.5%
1961	590	−18.6%

Year	Pop.	±%
1971	489	−17.1%
1981	430	−12.1%
1991	412	−4.2%
2001	417	+1.2%

Source: Data from ISTAT
