= Pietra de' Giorgi =

- Comune
- Comune di Pietra de' Giorgi
- Location within Italy Location within Lombardy
- Coordinates: 45°4′N 9°16′E
- Country: Italy
- Region: Lombardy
- Province: Province of Pavia (PV)

Area
  - Total: 11.0 km^{2} (4.2 sq mi)
- Elevation: 311 m (1,020 ft)

Population (Dec. 2004)
  - Total: 857
  - Density: 77.9/km^{2} (202/sq mi)
- Demonym: Predalini
- Time zone: UTC+1 (CET)
  - Summer (DST): UTC+2 (CEST)
- Postal code: 27040
- Dialing code: 0385

Pietra de' Giorgi is a comune (municipality) in the Province of Pavia in the Italian region Lombardy, about 45 km (28 mi) south of Milan and about 15 km (9.3 mi) southeast of Pavia. As of 31 December 2004, it had a population of 857 and an area of 11.0 km^{2} (4.2 sq mi).

Pietra de' Giorgi borders the following municipalities: Broni, Castana, Cigognola, Lirio, Montalto Pavese, Mornico Losana, Redavalle, Santa Giuletta, Santa Maria della Versa.

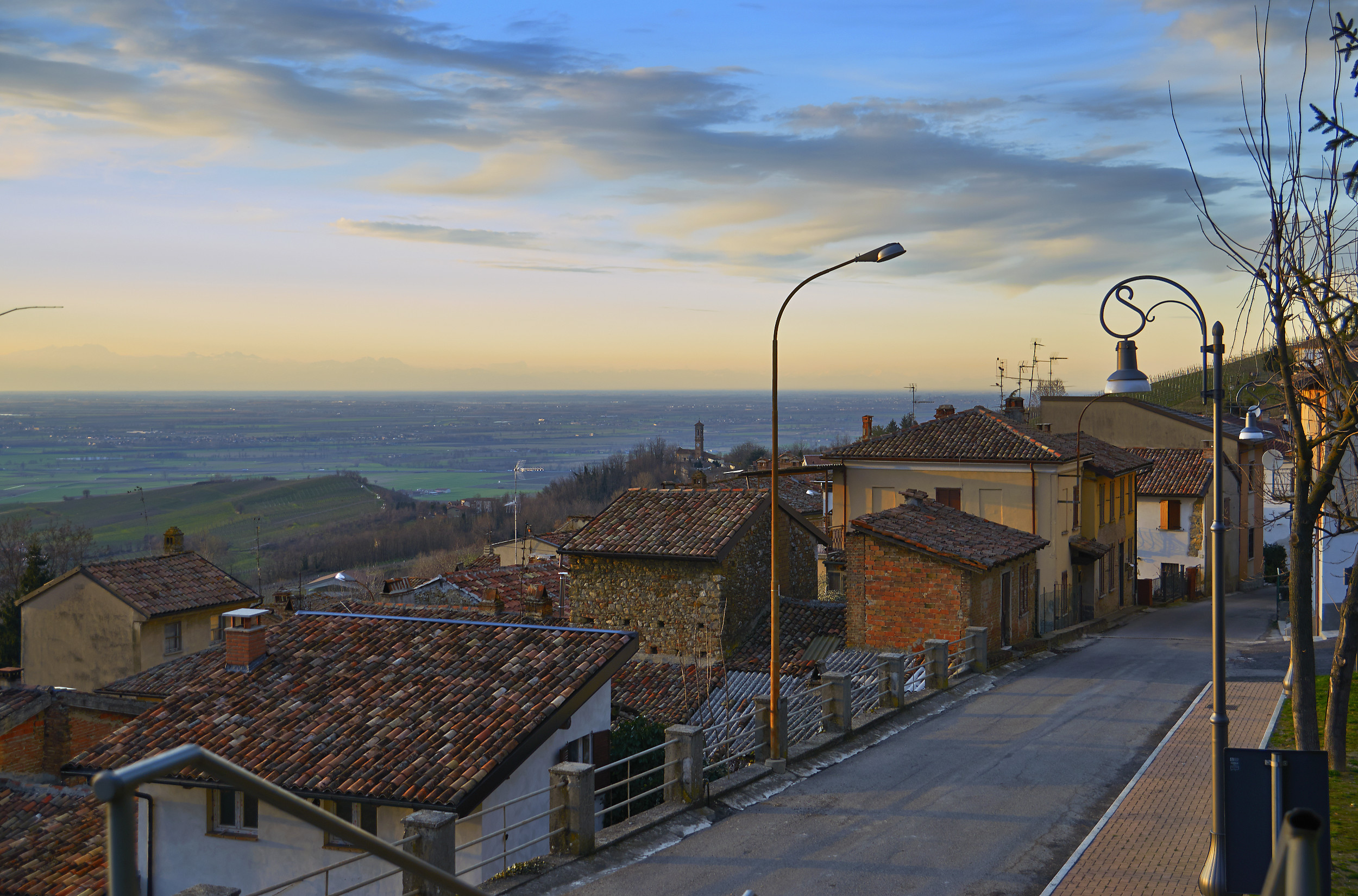

== Demographic evolution ==
Historical population

Year	Pop.	±%
1861	1,671	—
1871	1,747	+4.5%
1881	2,036	+16.5%
1901	2,236	+9.8%
1911	2,259	+1.0%

Year	Pop.	±%
1921	2,048	−9.3%
1931	2,128	+3.9%
1936	2,042	−4.0%
1951	1,816	−11.1%
1961	1,489	−18.0%

Year	Pop.	±%
1971	1,214	−18.5%
1981	1,005	−17.2%
1991	921	−8.4%
2001	875	−5.0%

Source: Data from ISTAT
