= Casanova Lonati =

- Comune
- Comune di Casanova Lonati
- Location within Italy Location within Lombardy
- Coordinates: 45°6′N 9°13′E
- Country: Italy
- Region: Lombardy
- Province: Province of Pavia (PV)

Area
  - Total: 4.6 km^{2} (1.8 sq mi)

Population (Dec. 2004)
  - Total: 455
  - Density: 99/km^{2} (260/sq mi)
- Time zone: UTC+1 (CET)
  - Summer (DST): UTC+2 (CEST)
- Postal code: 27041
- Dialing code: 0385

Casanova Lonati is a comune (municipality) in the Province of Pavia in the Italian region Lombardy, located about 40 km (25 mi) south of Milan and about 11 km (6.8 mi) southeast of Pavia. As of 31 December 2004, it had a population of 455 and an area of 4.6 km^{2} (1.8 sq mi).

Casanova Lonati borders the following municipalities: Albaredo Arnaboldi, Barbianello, Mezzanino, Pinarolo Po, Verrua Po.

== Demographic evolution ==
Historical population

Year	Pop.	±%
1861	553	—
1871	665	+20.3%
1881	655	−1.5%
1901	621	−5.2%
1911	613	−1.3%

Year	Pop.	±%
1921	638	+4.1%
1931	607	−4.9%
1936	596	−1.8%
1951	538	−9.7%
1961	506	−5.9%

Year	Pop.	±%
1971	392	−22.5%
1981	376	−4.1%
1991	422	+12.2%
2001	427	+1.2%

Source: Data from ISTAT
