= Albuzzano =

Albuzzano Albussan (Lombard)
- Comune
- Comune di Albuzzano
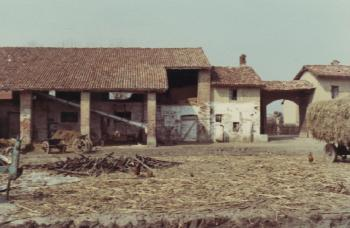
- Cascina Pescarona

- Location within Italy Location within Lombardy
- Coordinates: 45°11′N 9°16′E
- Country: Italy
- Region: Lombardy
- Province: Province of Pavia (PV)
- Frazioni: Barona, Cascina De Mensi, Alperolo, Torre d'Astari, Vigalfo

Area
  - Total: 15.3 km^{2} (5.9 sq mi)
- Elevation: 76 m (249 ft)

Population (Dec. 2004)
  - Total: 2,500
  - Density: 160/km^{2} (420/sq mi)
- Time zone: UTC+1 (CET)
  - Summer (DST): UTC+2 (CEST)
- Postal code: 27010
- Dialing code: 0382
- Website: Official website

Albuzzano (Lombard: Albussan) is a comune (municipality) in the Province of Pavia in the Italian region of Lombardy, located about 30 km (19 mi) south of Milan and about 9 km (5.6 mi) east of Pavia. As of 31 December 2004, it had a population of 2,500 and an area of 15.3 km^{2} (5.9 sq mi).

The municipality of Albuzzano contains the frazioni (subdivisions, mainly villages and hamlets) Barona, Cascina De Mensi, Alperolo, Torre d'Astari, and Vigalfo.

Albuzzano borders the following municipalities: Belgioioso, Cura Carpignano, Filighera, Linarolo, Valle Salimbene, Vistarino.

== Demographic evolution ==
Historical population

Year	Pop.	±%
1861	2,301	—
1871	2,407	+4.6%
1881	2,430	+1.0%
1901	2,382	−2.0%
1911	2,335	−2.0%

Year	Pop.	±%
1921	2,332	−0.1%
1931	2,191	−6.0%
1936	2,225	+1.6%
1951	2,223	−0.1%
1961	2,121	−4.6%

Year	Pop.	±%
1971	2,044	−3.6%
1981	1,938	−5.2%
1991	1,912	−1.3%
2001	2,256	+18.0%

Source: Data from ISTAT
