= Travacò Siccomario =

- Comune
- Comune di Travacò Siccomario
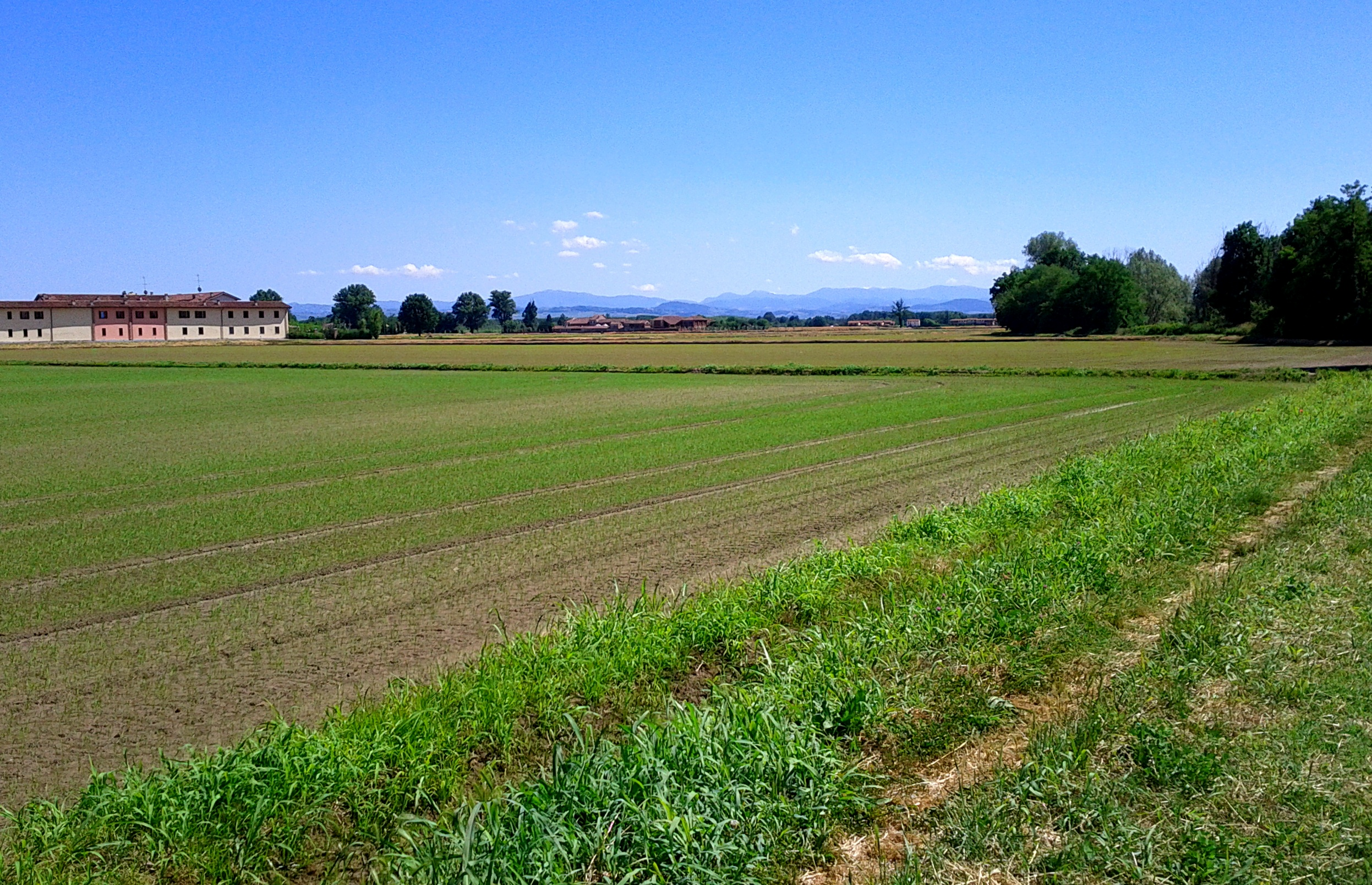
- The countryside in Travacò Siccomario

- Coat of arms

- Location within Italy Location within Lombardy
- Coordinates: 45°9′N 9°10′E
- Country: Italy
- Region: Lombardy
- Province: Pavia (PV)
- Frazioni: Battella, Boschi, Chiavica, Colonne, Frua, Mezzano Siccomario, Rotta, Valbona

Government
  - Mayor: Domizia Clensi

Area
  - Total: 17.05 km^{2} (6.58 sq mi)
- Elevation: 61 m (200 ft)

Population (1 January 2014)
  - Total: 4,471
  - Density: 262.2/km^{2} (679.2/sq mi)
- Demonym: Travacolini
- Time zone: UTC+1 (CET)
  - Summer (DST): UTC+2 (CEST)
- Postal code: 27020
- Dialing code: 0382
- Website: Official website

Travacò Siccomario is a comune (municipality) in the Province of Pavia in the Italian region Lombardy, located about 35 km south of Milan and about 4 km southeast of Pavia, near the confluence of the Po and Ticino rivers.

Travacò Siccomario borders the following municipalities: Cava Manara, Linarolo, Mezzanino, Pavia, Rea, San Martino Siccomario, Valle Salimbene, Verrua Po.

Travacò Siccomario is a member of Cittaslow.

== Twin towns ==
- Camaret-sur-Aigues, France
