= Santa Giuletta =

- Comune
- Comune di Santa Giuletta
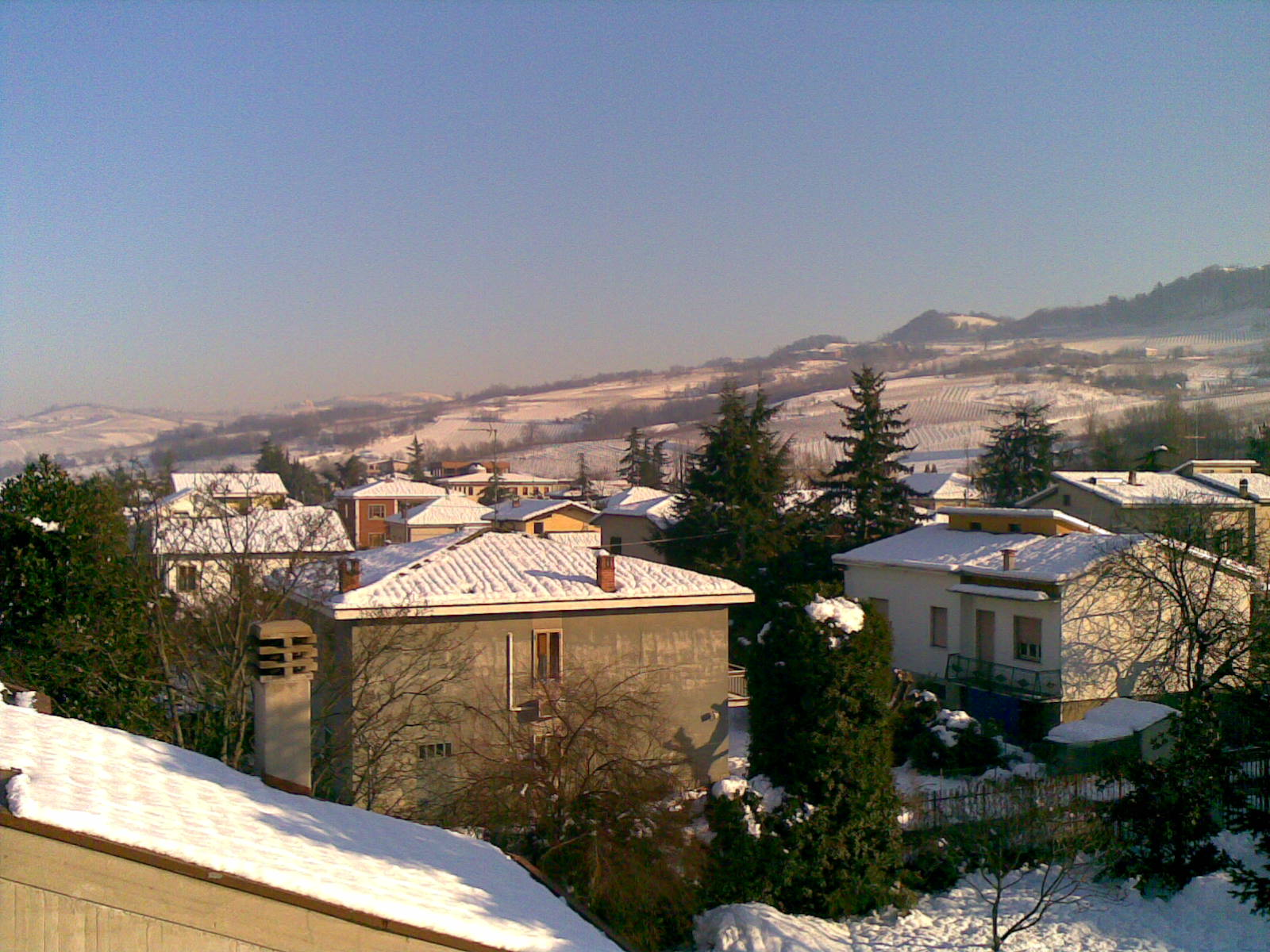
- Eastern part of Santa Giuletta

- Location within Italy Location within Lombardy
- Coordinates: 45°2′N 9°11′E
- Country: Italy
- Region: Lombardy
- Province: Province of Pavia (PV)

Area
  - Total: 11.7 km^{2} (4.5 sq mi)

Population (Dec. 2004)
  - Total: 1,605
  - Density: 137/km^{2} (355/sq mi)
- Time zone: UTC+1 (CET)
  - Summer (DST): UTC+2 (CEST)
- Postal code: 27046
- Dialing code: 0383

Santa Giuletta is a comune (municipality) in the Province of Pavia in the Italian region Lombardy, located about 50 km (31 mi) south of Milan and about 15 km (9.3 mi) south of Pavia. As of 31 December 2004, it had a population of 1,605 and an area of 11.7 km^{2} (4.5 sq mi).

Santa Giuletta borders the following municipalities: Barbianello, Mornico Losana, Pietra de' Giorgi, Pinarolo Po, Redavalle, Robecco Pavese, Torricella Verzate. Santa Giuletta is situated at the end of the Apennines chain. The village has a railway station on the line Alessandria-Voghera-piacenza. It is crossed by the SS10 "Padana inferiore". The area in which Santa Giuletta is located is known as "Oltrepo Pavese".

== Demographic evolution ==
Historical population

Year	Pop.	±%
1861	2,108	—
1871	2,226	+5.6%
1881	2,392	+7.5%
1901	2,372	−0.8%
1911	2,368	−0.2%

Year	Pop.	±%
1921	2,326	−1.8%
1931	2,216	−4.7%
1936	2,173	−1.9%
1951	2,110	−2.9%
1961	2,104	−0.3%

Year	Pop.	±%
1971	2,090	−0.7%
1981	1,934	−7.5%
1991	1,720	−11.1%
2001	1,615	−6.1%

Source: Data from ISTAT

== Twin towns ==
Santa Giuletta is twinned with:

- Mores, Sardinia, Italy
