= Zinasco =

- Comune
- Comune di Zinasco
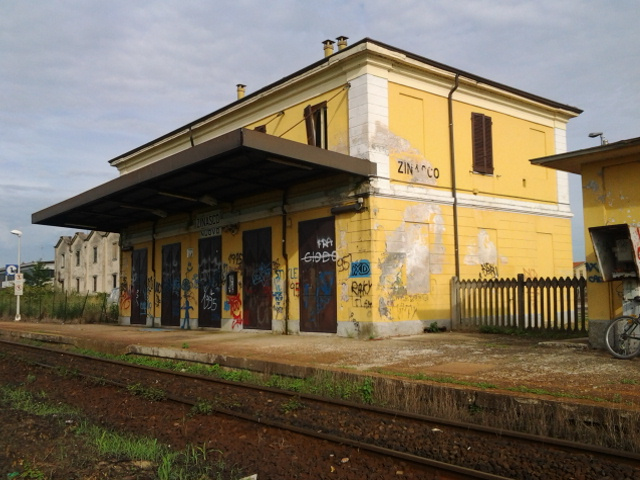

- Coat of arms

- Location within Italy Location within Lombardy
- Coordinates: 45°7′39″N 9°1′44″E
- Country: Italy
- Region: Lombardy
- Province: Pavia (PV)
- Frazioni: Bombardone, Cascinino, Gerone, Sairano

Government
  - Mayor: Giuseppe Miracca

Area
  - Total: 29.5 km^{2} (11.4 sq mi)
- Elevation: 84 m (276 ft)

Population (30 April 2010)
  - Total: 3,215
  - Density: 109/km^{2} (282/sq mi)
- Demonym: Zinaschesi
- Time zone: UTC+1 (CET)
  - Summer (DST): UTC+2 (CEST)
- Postal code: 27030
- Dialing code: 0382
- Patron saint: St. Anthony the Abbot
- Website: Official website

Zinasco is a comune (municipality) in the Province of Pavia in the Italian region Lombardy, located about 40 km south of Milan and about 10 km southwest of Pavia in the Lomellina. It is formed by two villages, Zinasco Vecchio, known from the 12th century, and Zinasco Nuovo ("Old" and "New Zinasco", respectively). It became part of the Savoy-Piedmont in 1713.

Zinasco borders the following municipalities: Bastida Pancarana, Carbonara al Ticino, Cava Manara, Cervesina, Corana, Dorno, Gropello Cairoli, Mezzana Rabattone, Pancarana, Pieve Albignola, Sommo, Villanova d'Ardenghi.
