= Redavalle =

- Comune
- Comune di Redavalle
- Coat of arms

- Location within Italy Location within Lombardy
- Coordinates: 45°2′N 9°11′E
- Country: Italy
- Region: Lombardy
- Province: Pavia (PV)
- Frazioni: Calcababbio, Casa Ramati

Area
  - Total: 5.47 km^{2} (2.11 sq mi)
- Elevation: 85 m (279 ft)

Population (Dec. 2004)
  - Total: 1,028
  - Density: 188/km^{2} (487/sq mi)
- Time zone: UTC+1 (CET)
  - Summer (DST): UTC+2 (CEST)
- Postal code: 27050
- Dialing code: 0385

Redavalle is a comune (municipality) in the Province of Pavia in the Italian region Lombardy, located about 50 km (31 mi) south of Milan and about 15 km (9.3 mi) south of Pavia.

Redavalle borders the following municipalities: Barbianello, Broni, Pietra de' Giorgi, Santa Giuletta.

== History ==
A Roman centre called Cameliomagus, Comillomagus or Camillomagus existed in the area. In the Middle Ages a settlement known as San Martino di Strada (St. Martin on the Road) replaced it, which was acquired by the commune of Pavia in 1164. It had a castle which was set on fire during the war against Frederick Barbarossa. San Martino's population gradually moved to Ridavalle, part of the fief of Broni.

== Demographic evolution ==
Historical population

Year	Pop.	±%
1861	1,158	—
1871	1,197	+3.4%
1881	1,265	+5.7%
1901	1,437	+13.6%
1911	1,388	−3.4%

Year	Pop.	±%
1921	1,389	+0.1%
1931	1,364	−1.8%
1936	1,290	−5.4%
1951	1,339	+3.8%
1961	1,310	−2.2%

Year	Pop.	±%
1971	1,181	−9.8%
1981	1,086	−8.0%
1991	1,019	−6.2%
2001	1,008	−1.1%

Source: Data from ISTAT

== Twin towns ==
- Vaux-en-Bugey, France
