= Sommo =

- Comune
- Comune di Sommo
- Location within Italy Location within Lombardy
- Coordinates: 45°8′N 9°5′E
- Country: Italy
- Region: Lombardy
- Province: Pavia (PV)
- Frazioni: San Fedele, Travedo

Government
  - Mayor: Giovanna Paola Ferrari

Area
  - Total: 14.87 km^{2} (5.74 sq mi)
- Elevation: 80 m (260 ft)

Population (31 December 2010)
  - Total: 1,132
  - Density: 76.13/km^{2} (197.2/sq mi)
- Demonym: Sommesi
- Time zone: UTC+1 (CET)
  - Summer (DST): UTC+2 (CEST)
- Postal code: 27048
- Dialing code: 0382
- Patron saint: St. Roch
- Saint day: August 16
- Website: Official website

Sommo is a comune (municipality) in the province of Pavia in the Italian region Lombardy, about 40 km south of Milan and about 8 km southwest of Pavia, on the eastern border of Lomellina traditional region.

Sommo borders the following municipalities: Bastida Pancarana, Cava Manara, Zinasco.
