= Linarolo =

- Comune
- Comune di Linarolo
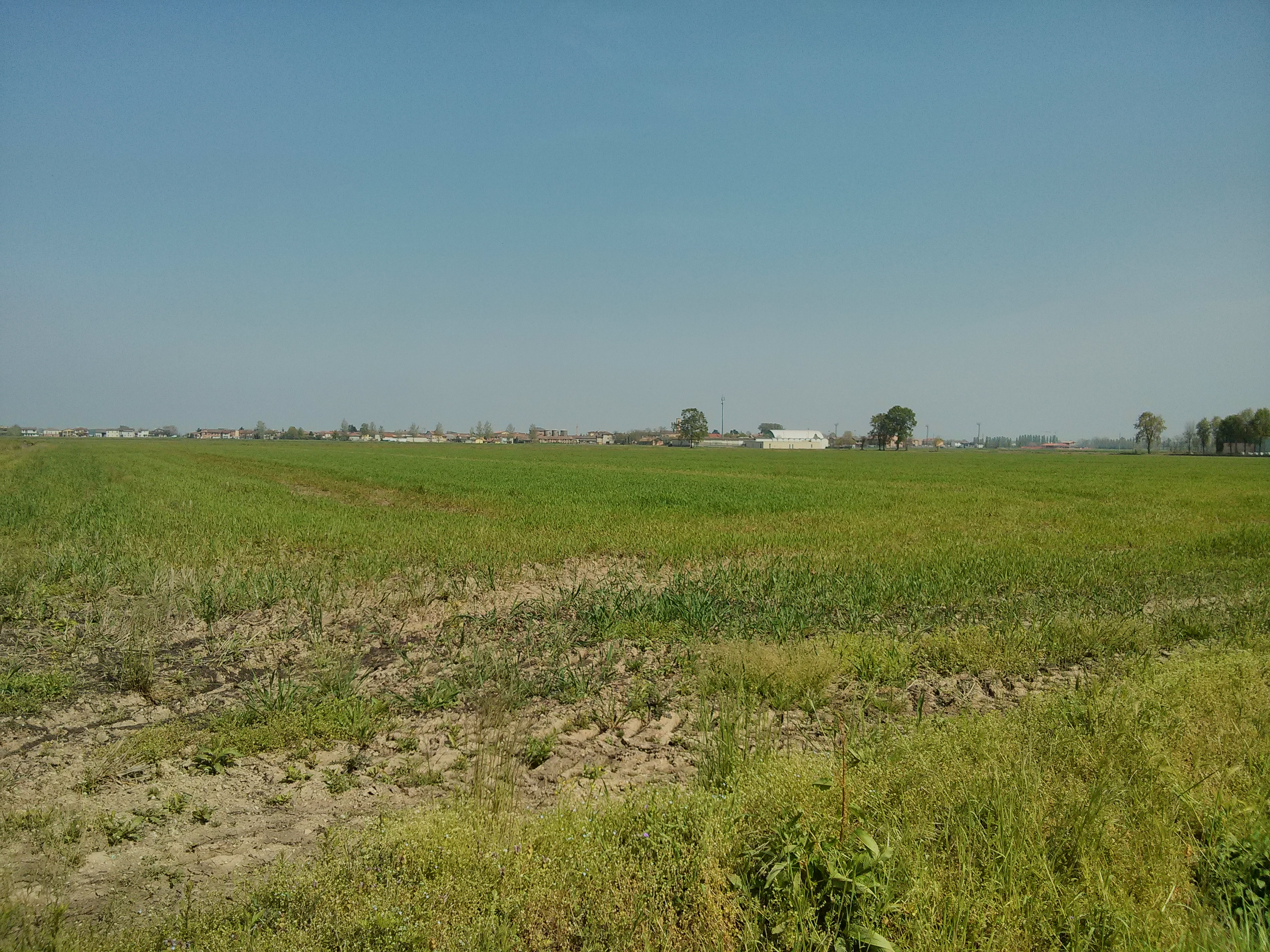

- Location within Italy Location within Lombardy
- Coordinates: 45°10′N 9°16′E
- Country: Italy
- Region: Lombardy
- Province: Province of Pavia (PV)
- Frazioni: Ospedaletto, San Leonardo, Vaccarizza

Area
  - Total: 12.3 km^{2} (4.7 sq mi)
- Elevation: 76 m (249 ft)

Population (Dec. 2004)
  - Total: 2,200
  - Density: 180/km^{2} (460/sq mi)
- Demonym: Linarolesi
- Time zone: UTC+1 (CET)
  - Summer (DST): UTC+2 (CEST)
- Postal code: 27010
- Dialing code: 0382

Linarolo is a comune (municipality) in the Province of Pavia in the Italian region Lombardy, located about 35 km (22 mi) south of Milan and about 9 km (5.6 mi) east of Pavia. As of 31 December 2004, it had a population of 2,200 and an area of 12.3 km^{2} (4.7 sq mi).

The municipality of Linarolo contains the frazioni (subdivisions, mainly villages and hamlets) Ospedaletto, San Leonardo, and Vaccarizza.

Linarolo borders the following municipalities: Albaredo Arnaboldi, Albuzzano, Belgioioso, Mezzanino, Travacò Siccomario, Valle Salimbene.

== Demographic evolution ==
Historical population

Year	Pop.	±%
1861	1,949	—
1871	2,303	+18.2%
1881	2,342	+1.7%
1901	2,315	−1.2%
1911	2,369	+2.3%

Year	Pop.	±%
1921	2,421	+2.2%
1931	2,480	+2.4%
1936	2,580	+4.0%
1951	2,636	+2.2%
1961	2,476	−6.1%

Year	Pop.	±%
1971	2,169	−12.4%
1981	2,079	−4.1%
1991	1,846	−11.2%
2001	2,172	+17.7%

Source: Data from ISTAT
