= San Martino Siccomario =

San Martino Siccomario San Martin
- Comune
- Città di San Martino Siccomario
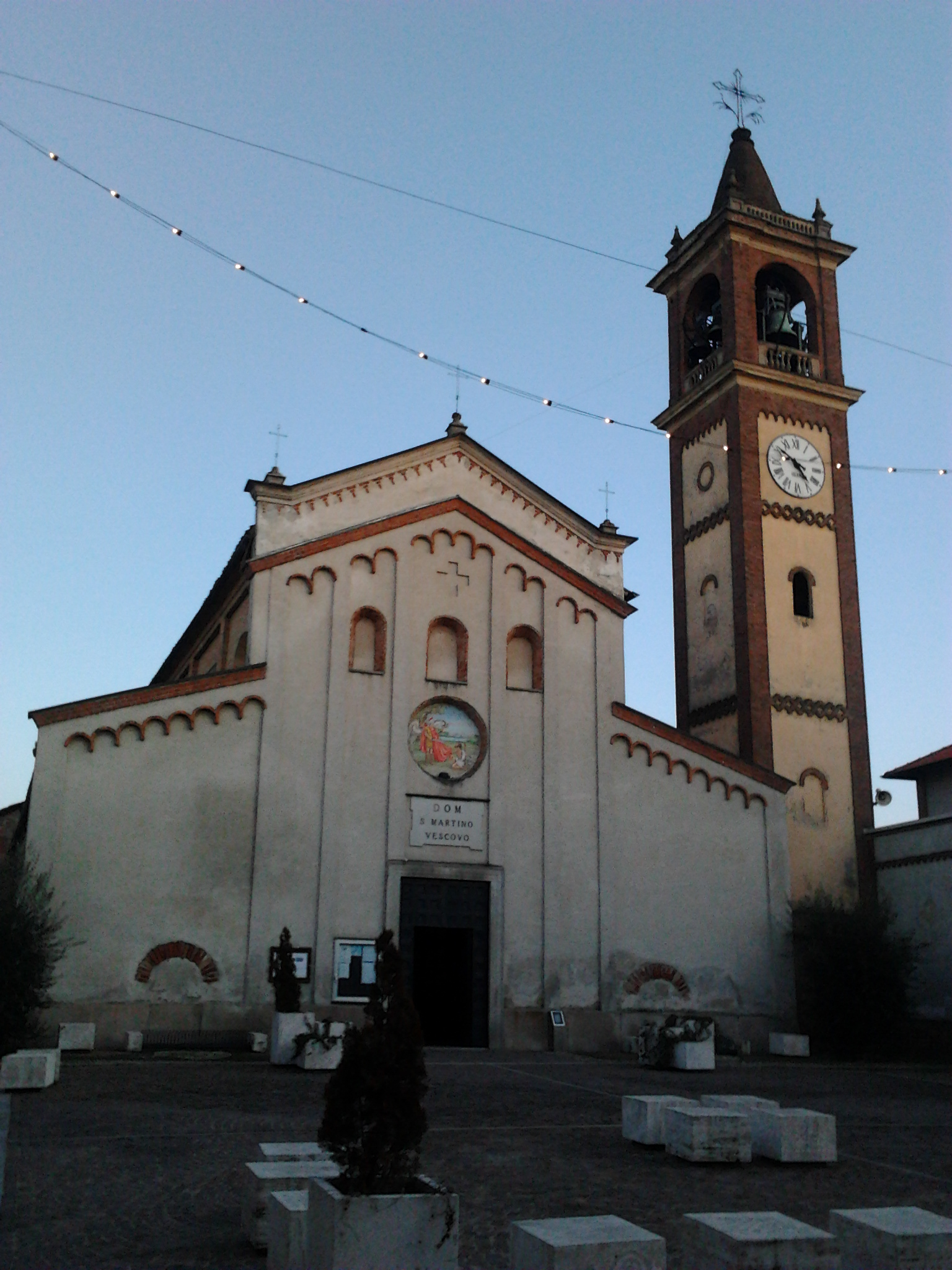
- Parish church.

- Coat of arms

- Location within Italy Location within Lombardy
- Coordinates: 45°9′N 9°8′E
- Country: Italy
- Region: Lombardy
- Province: Pavia (PV)
- Frazioni: Bivio Cava, La Madonna, Paradiso Nuovo, Paradiso Vecchio, Santa Croce

Government
  - Mayor: Alessandro Zocca

Area
  - Total: 14.3 km^{2} (5.5 sq mi)
- Elevation: 63 m (207 ft)

Population (1 January 2015)
  - Total: 6,036
  - Density: 422/km^{2} (1,090/sq mi)
- Demonym: Sammartinesi
- Time zone: UTC+1 (CET)
  - Summer (DST): UTC+2 (CEST)
- Postal code: 27028
- Dialing code: 0382
- Patron saint: St. Martin
- Saint day: August 5
- Website: Official website

San Martino Siccomario (Lombard: San Martin) is a comune in the Province of Pavia in the Italian region Lombardy, located about 35 km south of Milan and about 4 km southwest of Pavia. It is now effectively part of Pavia metropolitan area.

San Martino Siccomario borders the following municipalities: Carbonara al Ticino, Cava Manara, Pavia, Travacò Siccomario.

== History ==
According to legend, St. Martin of Tours lived here as a child; in the 9th century a monastery entitled to the saint existed here. Later it was a fief of the Beccaria family (see Montù Beccaria) and other families. In 1743 it was annexed to the Kingdom of Sardinia (Piedmont), remaining the boundary with the Austrian-controlled Lombardy-Venetia until 1859.

On the Gravellone stream, in 1848, king Charles Albert of Sardinia assigned for the first time to his army the Tricolore, which was to become Italy's flag.
