= Broni =

- Comune
- Comune di Broni
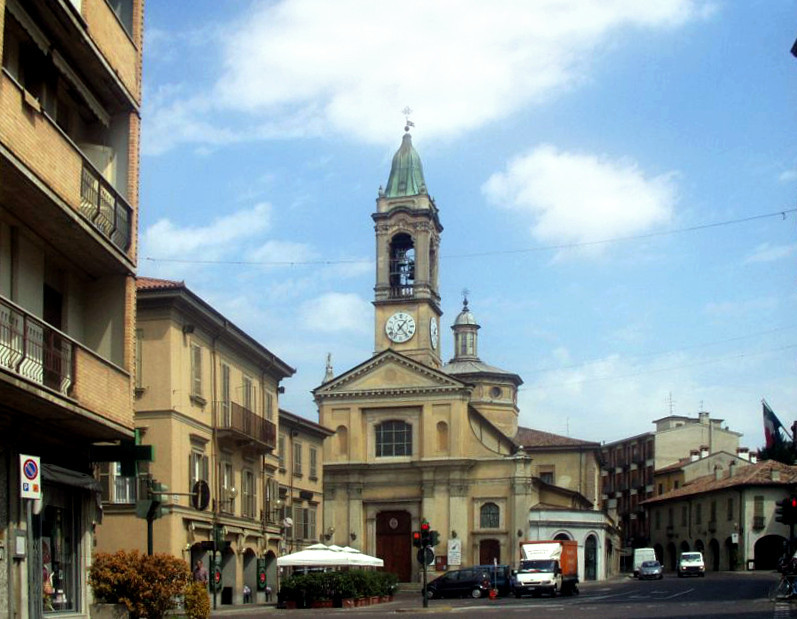
- Church in Broni

- Location within Italy Location within Lombardy
- Coordinates: 45°4′N 9°16′E
- Country: Italy
- Region: Lombardy
- Province: Pavia (PV)

Government
  - Mayor: Antonio Riviezzi

Area
  - Total: 20.9 km^{2} (8.1 sq mi)
- Elevation: 88 m (289 ft)

Population (Dec. 2004)
  - Total: 9,279
  - Density: 444/km^{2} (1,150/sq mi)
- Demonym: Bronesi
- Time zone: UTC+1 (CET)
  - Summer (DST): UTC+2 (CEST)
- Postal code: 27043
- Dialing code: 0385
- Website: Official website

Broni is a comune (municipality) in the Province of Pavia in the Italian region Lombardy, located about 45 km south of Milan and about 15 km southeast of Pavia.

Broni borders the following municipalities: Albaredo Arnaboldi, Barbianello, Campospinoso, Canneto Pavese, Cigognola, Pietra de' Giorgi, Redavalle, San Cipriano Po, Stradella.

== Notable people ==
- Cecilia Zandalasini (born 1996), WNBA small forward for the Golden State Valkyries

== Twin towns ==
Broni is twinned with:

- Ferrara, Italy, since 2001
