= Barbianello =

Barbianello Barbiané (Lombard)
- Comune
- Comune di Barbianello
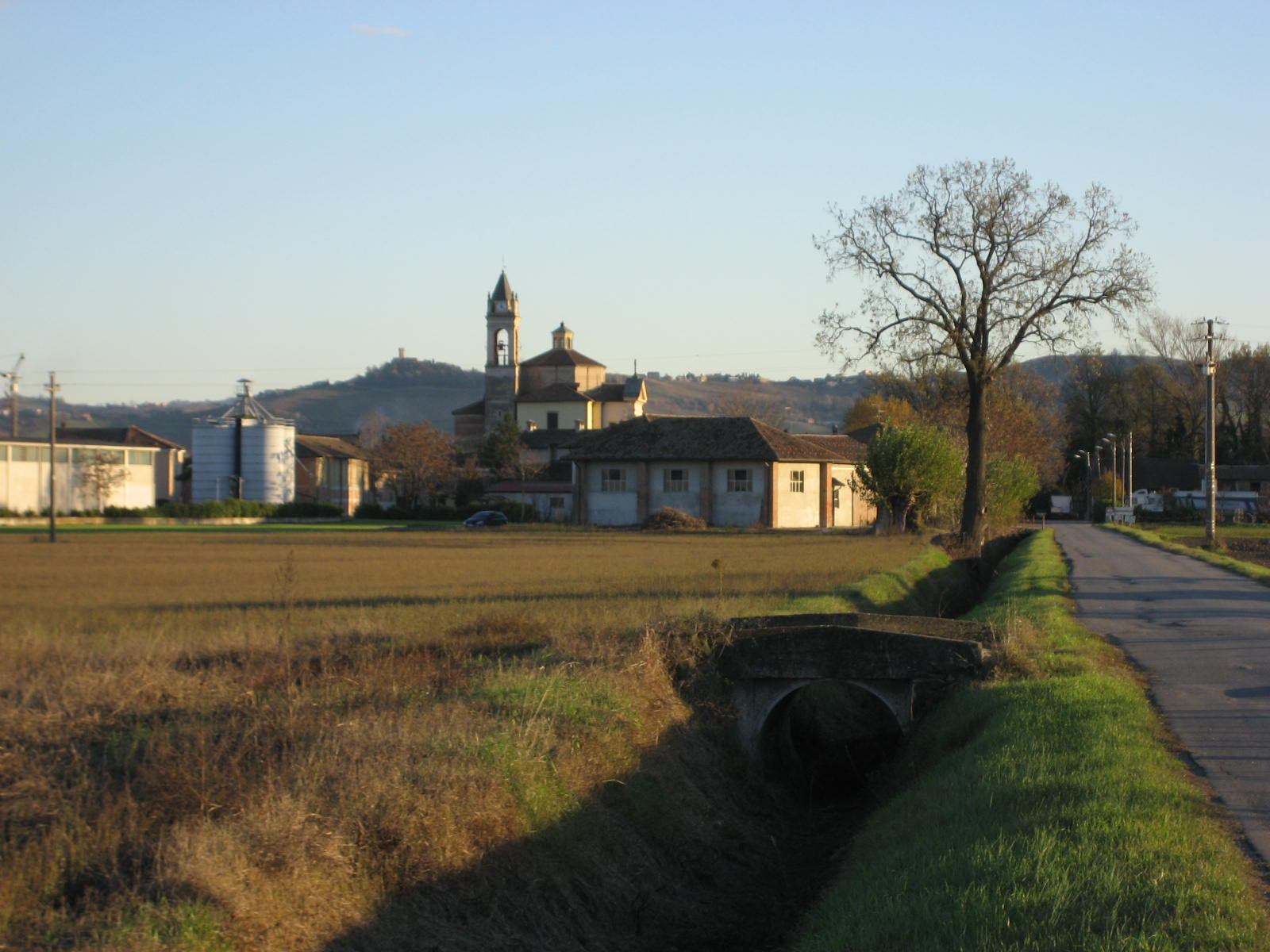
- View of Barbianello

- Coat of arms

- Location within Italy Location within Lombardy
- Coordinates: 45°4′N 9°12′E
- Country: Italy
- Region: Lombardy
- Province: Pavia (PV)
- Frazioni: Bottarolo, San Re

Government
  - Mayor: Giorgio Falbo

Area
  - Total: 11.83 km^{2} (4.57 sq mi)
- Elevation: 63 m (207 ft)

Population (2005)
  - Total: 847
  - Density: 71.6/km^{2} (185/sq mi)
- Demonym: Barbianellesi
- Time zone: UTC+1 (CET)
  - Summer (DST): UTC+2 (CEST)
- Postal code: 27041
- Dialing code: 0385
- Patron saint: St. George
- Website: Official website

Barbianello (Lombard: Barbiané) is a comune (municipality) in the Province of Pavia in the Italian region of Lombardy, located about 45 km south of Milan and about 14 km southeast of Pavia.

Barbianello borders the following municipalities: Albaredo Arnaboldi, Broni, Campospinoso, Casanova Lonati, Pinarolo Po, Redavalle, Santa Giuletta.
