= Mezzanino =

- Comune
- Comune di Mezzanino
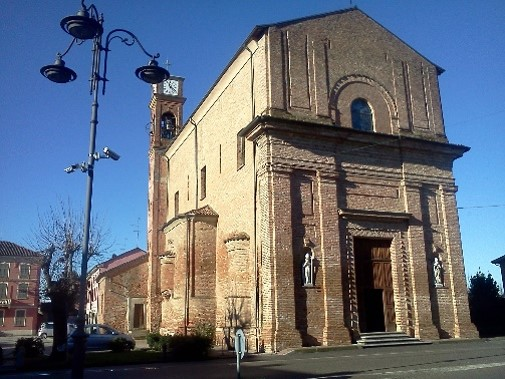

- Location within Italy Location within Lombardy
- Coordinates: 45°8′N 9°12′E
- Country: Italy
- Region: Lombardy
- Province: Province of Pavia (PV)
- Frazioni: Cassinetta, Malpensata di Sopra, Malpensata di Sotto, Busca, Tornello, Alberelli, Palazzo, Maccabruna, Calcedonia, Caldera, Oratorio

Area
  - Total: 13.9 km^{2} (5.4 sq mi)
- Elevation: 62 m (203 ft)

Population (Dec. 2004)
  - Total: 1,435
  - Density: 103/km^{2} (267/sq mi)
- Demonym: Mezzaninesi
- Time zone: UTC+1 (CET)
  - Summer (DST): UTC+2 (CEST)
- Postal code: 27040
- Dialing code: 0385
- Website: Official website

Mezzanino is a comune (municipality) in the Province of Pavia in the Italian region Lombardy, located about 35 km (22 mi) south of Milan and about 7 km (4.3 mi) southeast of Pavia. As of 31 December 2004, it had a population of 1,435 and an area of 13.9 km^{2} (5.4 sq mi).

The municipality of Mezzanino contains the frazioni (subdivisions, mainly villages and hamlets) Cassinetta, Malpensata di Sopra, Malpensata di Sotto, Busca, Tornello, Alberelli, Palazzo, Maccabruna, Calcedonia, Caldera, and Oratorio.

Mezzanino borders the following municipalities: Albaredo Arnaboldi, Casanova Lonati, Linarolo, Travacò Siccomario, Verrua Po.

== Demographic evolution ==
Historical population

Year	Pop.	±%
1861	1,569	—
1871	1,843	+17.5%
1881	1,826	−0.9%
1901	1,842	+0.9%
1911	1,904	+3.4%

Year	Pop.	±%
1921	1,719	−9.7%
1931	1,713	−0.3%
1936	1,693	−1.2%
1951	1,709	+0.9%
1961	1,589	−7.0%

Year	Pop.	±%
1971	1,439	−9.4%
1981	1,441	+0.1%
1991	1,409	−2.2%
2001	1,468	+4.2%

Source: Data from ISTAT

== Notable people ==
- Josefina Passadori
