= Mezzana Rabattone =

- Comune
- Comune di Mezzana Rabattone
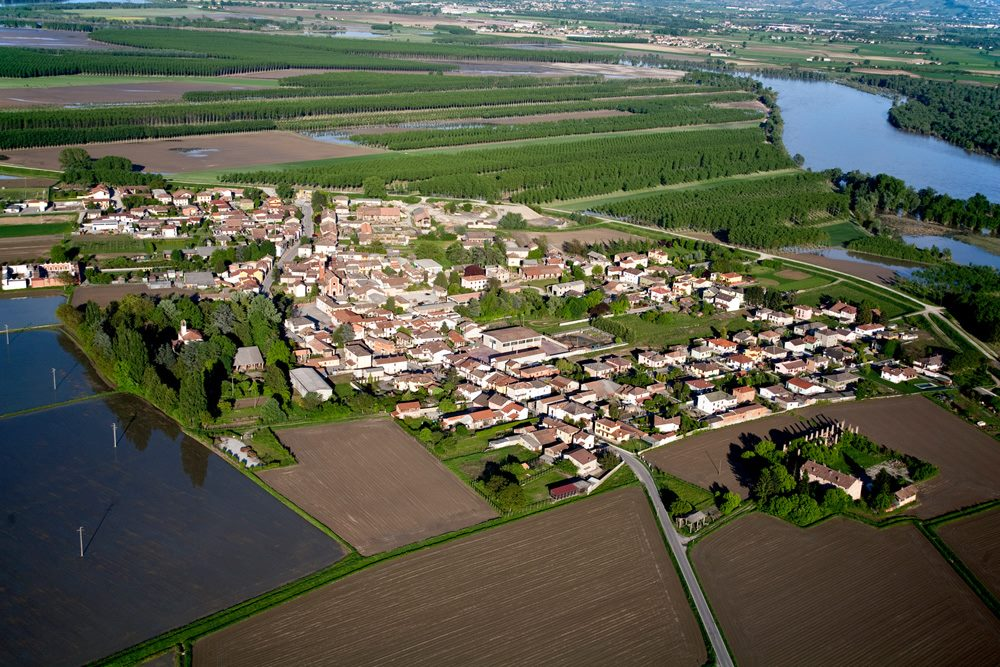

- Coat of arms

- Location within Italy Location within Lombardy
- Coordinates: 45°6′N 9°2′E
- Country: Italy
- Region: Lombardy
- Province: Pavia (PV)

Government
  - Mayor: Giorgio Facchina

Area
  - Total: 7.0 km^{2} (2.7 sq mi)
- Elevation: 68 m (223 ft)

Population (31 August 2007)
  - Total: 507
  - Density: 72/km^{2} (190/sq mi)
- Demonym: Mezzanesi
- Time zone: UTC+1 (CET)
  - Summer (DST): UTC+2 (CEST)
- Postal code: 27030
- Dialing code: 0382
- Website: Official website

Mezzana Rabattone is a comune (municipality) in the Province of Pavia in the Italian region Lombardy, located about 40 kilometres (25 mi) south of Milan and about 13 kilometres (8 mi) southwest of Pavia.

It is part of the lower Lomellina in the Po River valley, near its confluence with the Terdoppio.
