= Stradella, Lombardy =

Stradella Stradéla (Lombard)
- Comune
- Città di Stradella
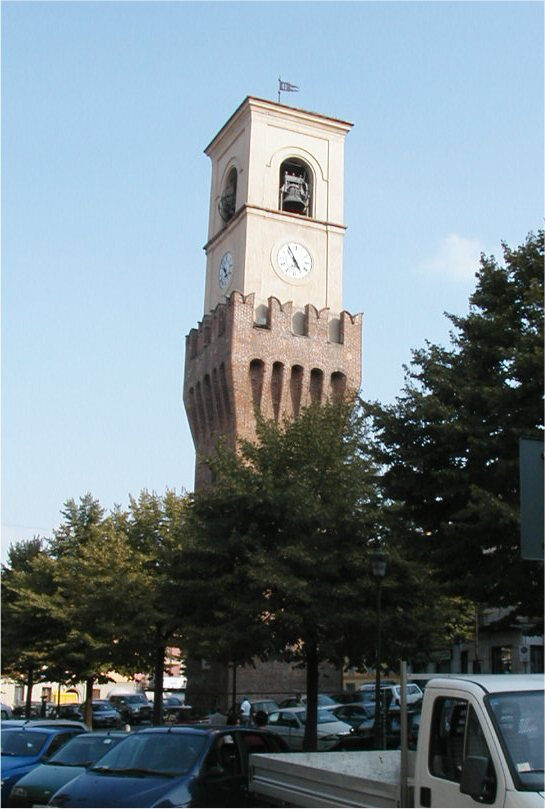
- Civic tower of Stradella

- Coat of arms

- Location within Italy Location within Lombardy
- Coordinates: 45°5′N 9°18′E
- Country: Italy
- Region: Lombardy
- Province: Pavia (PV)
- Frazioni: Casamassimini, Torre Sacchetti, Colombetta-Piane, Boccazza, Casa Agati, Casa Berni, Cassinello, Montebruciato, Orzoni, Plessa, Sant'Antonio, Santa Croce, Santa Maria, Solinga, Valle Muto

Government
  - Mayor: Pietro Angelo Lombardi

Area
  - Total: 18.77 km^{2} (7.25 sq mi)
- Elevation: 101 m (331 ft)

Population (31 December 2004)
  - Total: 10,922
  - Density: 581.9/km^{2} (1,507/sq mi)
- Demonym: Stradellini
- Time zone: UTC+1 (CET)
  - Summer (DST): UTC+2 (CEST)
- Postal code: 27049
- Dialing code: 0385
- Patron saint: Sts. Nabore and Felice
- Saint day: 12 July
- Website: www.comune.stradella.pv.it

Stradella (Lombard: Stradéla) is a town and comune (municipality) of the Oltrepò Pavese in the Province of Pavia in the northern Italian region of Lombardy. It is situated in the Padan Plain, about 5 km (3 mi) south of the river Po and has a population of 10,922.

== History ==
Stradella, together with what is now the almost disinhabited locality of Montalino, was under the suzerainty of the bishop of Pavia in the early Middle Ages (being the most important center of the fief in the 11th century). Montalino and Pavia were repeatedly ravaged in the course of the Wars of the Guelphs and Ghibellines, particularly in 1373 by John Hawkwood's troops.

The bishop's seigniory ended in 1797 with the abolition of feudalism. It obtained the status of town in 1865. Stradella received the honorary title of city with a royal decree on May 25, 1865.

== Musical tradition ==
The city was once an important centre for the production of accordions and still hosts a museum dedicated to this instrument. Mariano Dallapé was the first accordion builder in Stradella, his business was continued by his sons and further descendants. Later famous names include the brothers Crosio Fratelli.

== Personalities ==
Stradella was the birthplace of Agostino Depretis.

== Sport ==
Football:

- Stradellina, Promozione, group G
- Oratorio Stradella, Terza Categoria, group C

Basketball:

- Pallacanestro Stradella, Promozione
