= Bressana Bottarone =

- Comune
- Comune di Bressana Bottarone
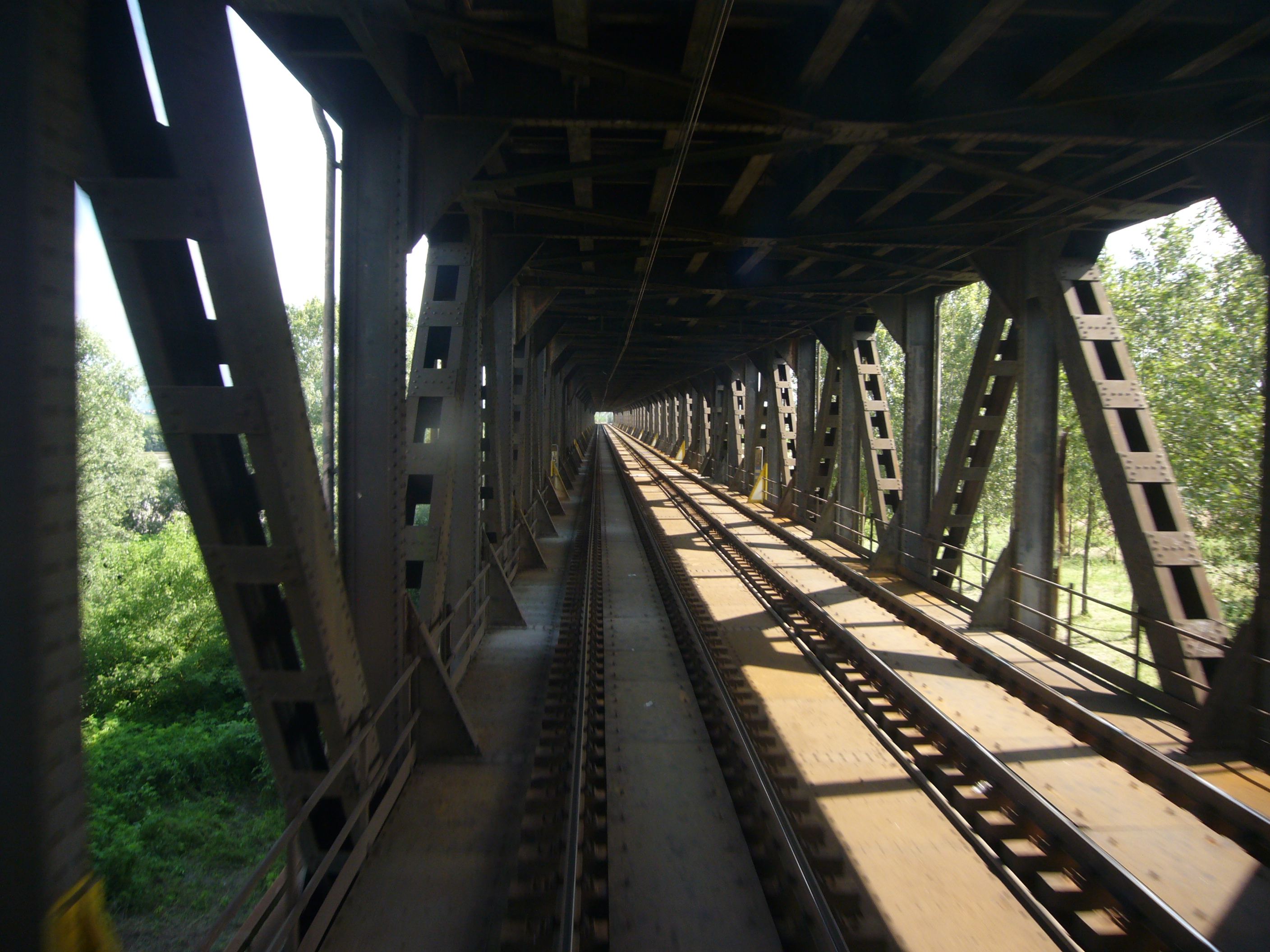
- The bridge over the Po on the Genoa–Milan railway at Bressana Bottarone

- Coat of arms

- Location within Italy Location within Lombardy
- Coordinates: 45°5′N 9°8′E
- Country: Italy
- Region: Lombardy
- Province: Pavia (PV)

Government
  - Mayor: Maria Teresa Toretta

Area
  - Total: 12.69 km^{2} (4.90 sq mi)
- Elevation: 69 m (226 ft)

Population (30 April 2017)
  - Total: 3,500
  - Density: 280/km^{2} (710/sq mi)
- Demonym: Bressanesi
- Time zone: UTC+1 (CET)
  - Summer (DST): UTC+2 (CEST)
- Postal code: 27042
- Dialing code: 0383
- Website: Official website

Bressana Bottarone is a comune (municipality) in the Province of Pavia in the Italian region Lombardy, located about 45 km south of Milan and about 11 km south of Pavia.
