= Province of Pavia =

Province of Italy, located in the Lombardy region

Coordinates: 45°11′N 9°9′E

Province of Pavia Provincia di Pavia (Italian)
- Province
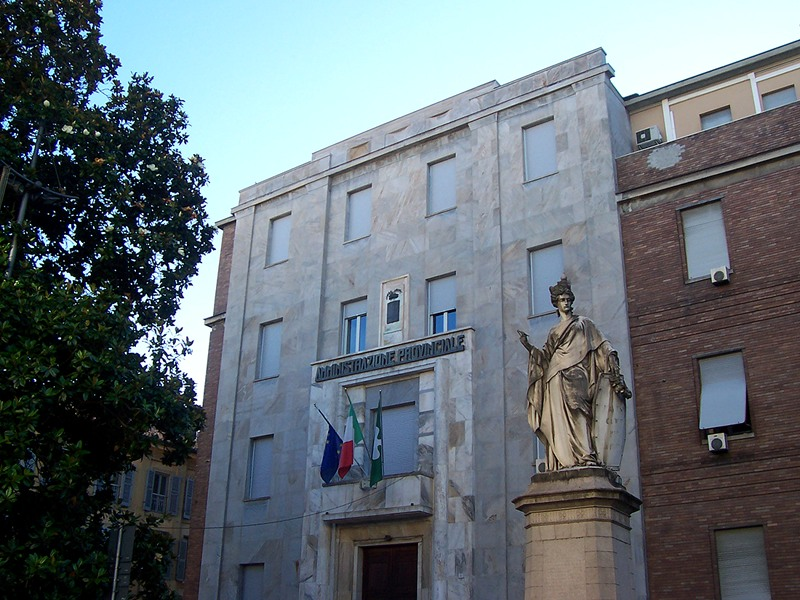
- Palazzo della Provincia, the seat of the province

- Coat of arms

- Location of the province of Pavia in Italy
- Country: Italy
- Region: Lombardy
- Capital(s): Pavia
- Municipalities: 184

Government
  - President: Giovanni Palli

Area
  - Total: 2,968.64 km^{2} (1,146.20 sq mi)

Population (2026)
  - Total: 546,023
  - Density: 183.930/km^{2} (476.377/sq mi)

GDP
  - Total: €13.188 billion (2015)
  - Per capita: €24,052 (2015)
- Time zone: UTC+1 (CET)
  - Summer (DST): UTC+2 (CEST)
- Postal code: 27010-27027, 27029-27030, 27032, 27034-27055, 27057-27059, 27100
- Telephone prefix: 0381, 0382, 0383, 0384, 0385
- Vehicle registration: PV
- ISTAT: 018

The province of Pavia (Italian: provincia di Pavia) is a province in the region of Lombardy in Italy. Its capital is Pavia.

It has a population of 546,023 in an area of 2,968.64 square kilometres (1,146.20 sq mi) across its 184 municipalities.

== History ==
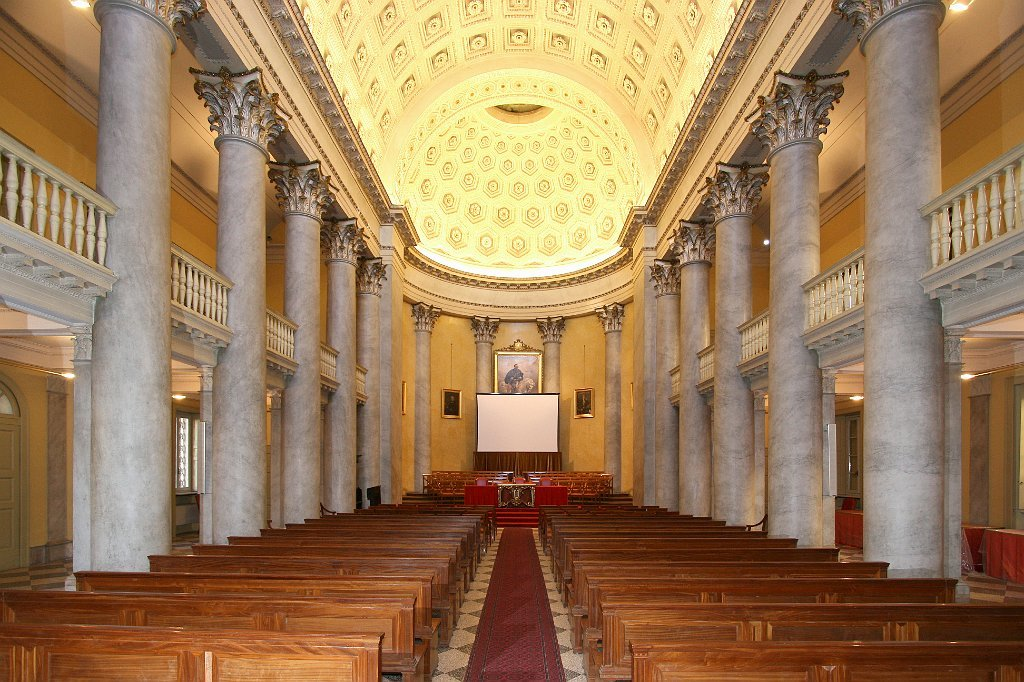
Interior of the University of Pavia, founded in 1361

The city Pavia was initially settled by the Ligures and was later occupied by Gaulish tribes; it was conquered by the Romans in 220 BCE. Named "Ticinum" by the Romans, the town was reinforced and became a key part of their defenses in northern Italy; despite this, the town was sacked by Attila, the ruler of the Hunnic Empire, in 452 CE, and then again by Odoacer in 476 CE. In the sixth century it was the capital of German tribe the Lombards and survived an attempted Frankish invasion. However, following the death of Charlemagne, the Lombard territory became part of Frankish territory.

In the 12th century, it became a commune after Frankish rule ceased, and Frederick I, Holy Roman Emperor fortified areas of the commune and he was crowned in Pavia in 1155. The University of Pavia was founded in 1361. Starting from 1359, Pavia and its neighbourhood were owned by the Visconti and then the Sforza of Milan. On 12 June 1499, the county, under the direct rule of the Duke of Milan, was elevated to the rank of principality (Fürst) by the Emperor Maximilian I, becoming the Principality of Pavia. Sforza rule came to an end when, in 1499, the Duchy of Milan became a Spanish possession. It was the scene of a Franco-Imperial battle in 1525, in which Charles V, Holy Roman Emperor defeated Francis I of France. In 1707 and again 1774, parts of the so-called "principality of Pavia", a province of the Duchy under the Spaniards, were sold to Piedmont; these changes were restored after the collapse of the French Empire in 1814.

== Geography ==
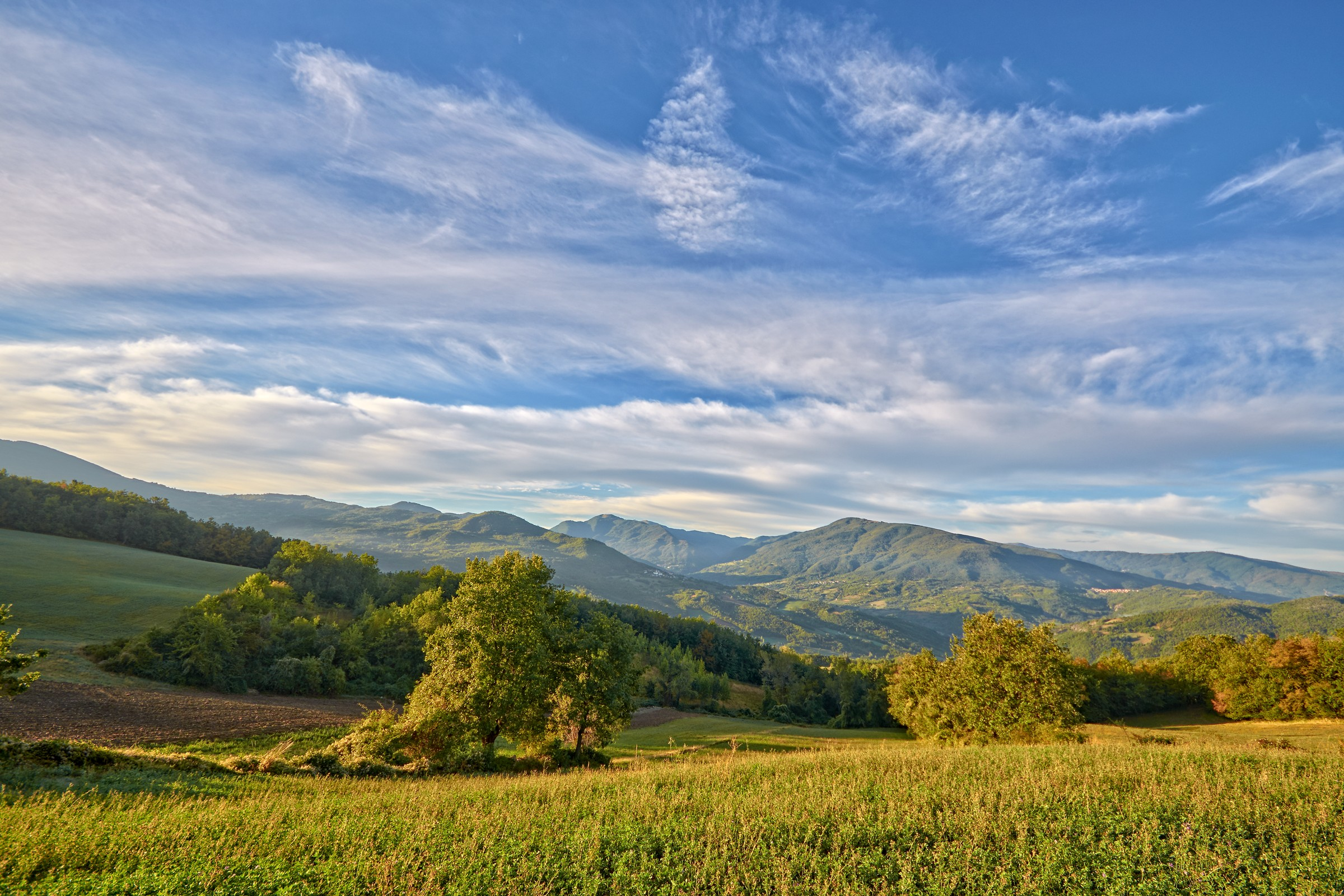
View of Oltrepò Pavese

The Province of Pavia is in the region of Lombardy in northwestern Italy. It is bounded to the north by the provinces of Milan and Lodi, to the southeast by the Province of Piacenza (Emilia-Romagna), and to the southwest it is bounded by the Province of Alessandria (Piedmont). The province is crossed by the rivers Ticino and Po, which meet four kilometres south of the capital, Pavia. The province contains 190 communes and the River Po is navigable up to its confluence with the Ticino. There are three regions of the province, the Pavese, which is entirely in the Po Valley, the Lomellina, which is also completely in the Po Valley but between the Ticino and the Po, and Oltrepò, to the south of the Po and which includes Monte Lesima (1,724 m (5,656 ft)), a mountain in the Apennine Mountains which is the highest point in the province. The territory of Siccomario, at the confluence of the two great rivers, should properly be included in Lomellina, but for historical reasons it is considered part of Pavese. Another large river flowing through the province is the Olona.

The province is mostly flat with the northwestern part of the province being good agricultural land. The southern part rises to low hills which give way to the Ligurian Apennines. The town of Pavia has a major position in northern Italy's textile industry and is renowned for hatmaking. It also plays its part in the country's engineering and metallurgical industries. This is an important winemaking district and produces sparkling wines. It is the largest area in Italy for the production of Pinot noir.

=== Regions ===
The province is mainly divided into 3 geographical regions:

Region	Population	Area (km²)	Seat	Municipalities	Map
Lomellina	214,494	1,097	Vigevano	58	
Oltrepò Pavese	146,579	1,240	Voghera	78	
Pavese	189,394	650	Pavia	52	

== Municipalities ==
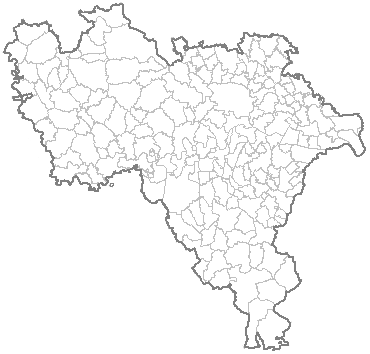
Map of the municipalities of the province

The province has 184 municipalities:

- Alagna
- Albonese
- Albuzzano
- Arena Po
- Badia Pavese
- Bagnaria
- Barbianello
- Bascapè
- Bastida Pancarana
- Battuda
- Belgioioso
- Bereguardo
- Borgarello
- Borgo Priolo
- Borgo San Siro
- Borgoratto Mormorolo
- Bornasco
- Bosnasco
- Brallo di Pregola
- Breme
- Bressana Bottarone
- Broni
- Calvignano
- Campospinoso Albaredo
- Candia Lomellina
- Canneto Pavese
- Carbonara al Ticino
- Casanova Lonati
- Casatisma
- Casei Gerola
- Casorate Primo
- Cassolnovo
- Castana
- Casteggio
- Castelletto di Branduzzo
- Castello d'Agogna
- Castelnovetto
- Cava Manara
- Cecima
- Ceranova
- Ceretto Lomellina
- Cergnago
- Certosa di Pavia
- Cervesina
- Chignolo Po
- Cigognola
- Cilavegna
- Codevilla
- Colli Verdi
- Confienza
- Copiano
- Corana
- Cornale e Bastida
- Corteolona e Genzone
- Corvino San Quirico
- Costa de' Nobili
- Cozzo
- Cura Carpignano
- Dorno
- Ferrera Erbognone
- Filighera
- Fortunago
- Frascarolo
- Galliavola
- Gambarana
- Gambolò
- Garlasco
- Gerenzago
- Giussago
- Godiasco
- Golferenzo
- Gravellona Lomellina
- Gropello Cairoli
- Inverno e Monteleone
- Landriano
- Langosco
- Lardirago
- Linarolo
- Lomello
- Lungavilla
- Magherno
- Marcignago
- Marzano
- Mede
- Menconico
- Mezzana Bigli
- Mezzana Rabattone
- Mezzanino
- Miradolo Terme
- Montalto Pavese
- Montebello della Battaglia
- Montecalvo Versiggia
- Montescano
- Montesegale
- Monticelli Pavese
- Montù Beccaria
- Mornico Losana
- Mortara
- Nicorvo
- Olevano di Lomellina
- Oliva Gessi
- Ottobiano
- Palestro
- Pancarana
- Parona
- Pavia
- Pietra de' Giorgi
- Pieve Albignola
- Pieve del Cairo
- Pieve Porto Morone
- Pinarolo Po
- Pizzale
- Ponte Nizza
- Portalbera
- Rea
- Redavalle
- Retorbido
- Rivanazzano Terme
- Robbio
- Robecco Pavese
- Rocca de' Giorgi
- Rocca Susella
- Rognano
- Romagnese
- Roncaro
- Rosasco
- Rovescala
- San Cipriano Po
- San Damiano al Colle
- San Genesio ed Uniti
- San Giorgio di Lomellina
- San Martino Siccomario
- San Zenone al Po
- Sannazzaro de' Burgondi
- Sant'Alessio con Vialone
- Sant'Angelo Lomellina
- Santa Cristina e Bissone
- Santa Giuletta
- Santa Margherita di Staffora
- Santa Maria della Versa
- Sartirana Lomellina
- Scaldasole
- Semiana
- Silvano Pietra
- Siziano
- Sommo
- Spessa
- Stradella
- Suardi
- Torrazza Coste
- Torre Beretti e Castellaro
- Torre d'Arese
- Torre d'Isola
- Torre de' Negri
- Torrevecchia Pia
- Torricella Verzate
- Travacò Siccomario
- Trivolzio
- Tromello
- Trovo
- Val di Nizza
- Valeggio
- Valle Lomellina
- Valle Salimbene
- Varzi
- Velezzo Lomellina
- Vellezzo Bellini
- Verretto
- Verrua Po
- Vidigulfo
- Vigevano
- Villa Biscossi
- Villanova d'Ardenghi
- Villanterio
- Vistarino
- Voghera
- Volpara
- Zavattarello
- Zeccone
- Zeme
- Zenevredo
- Zerbo
- Zerbolò
- Zinasco

== Demographics ==
As of 2026, the population is 546,023, of which 49.4% are male, and 50.6% are female. Minors make up 14.1% of the population, and seniors make up 25.5%.

Historical population

Year	Pop.	±%
1861	403,149	—
1871	438,794	+8.8%
1881	458,638	+4.5%
1901	484,313	+5.6%
1911	498,370	+2.9%
1921	488,883	−1.9%
1931	487,323	−0.3%
1936	492,166	+1.0%

Year	Pop.	±%
1951	506,511	+2.9%
1961	518,193	+2.3%
1971	526,389	+1.6%
1981	512,895	−2.6%
1991	490,898	−4.3%
2001	493,753	+0.6%
2011	535,822	+8.5%
2021	534,506	−0.2%

Source: ISTAT

=== Immigration ===
As of 2025, immigrants make up 15.0% of the population. The 5 largest foreign countries of birth are Romania, Albania, Egypt, Morocco, and Ukraine.

== Transport ==
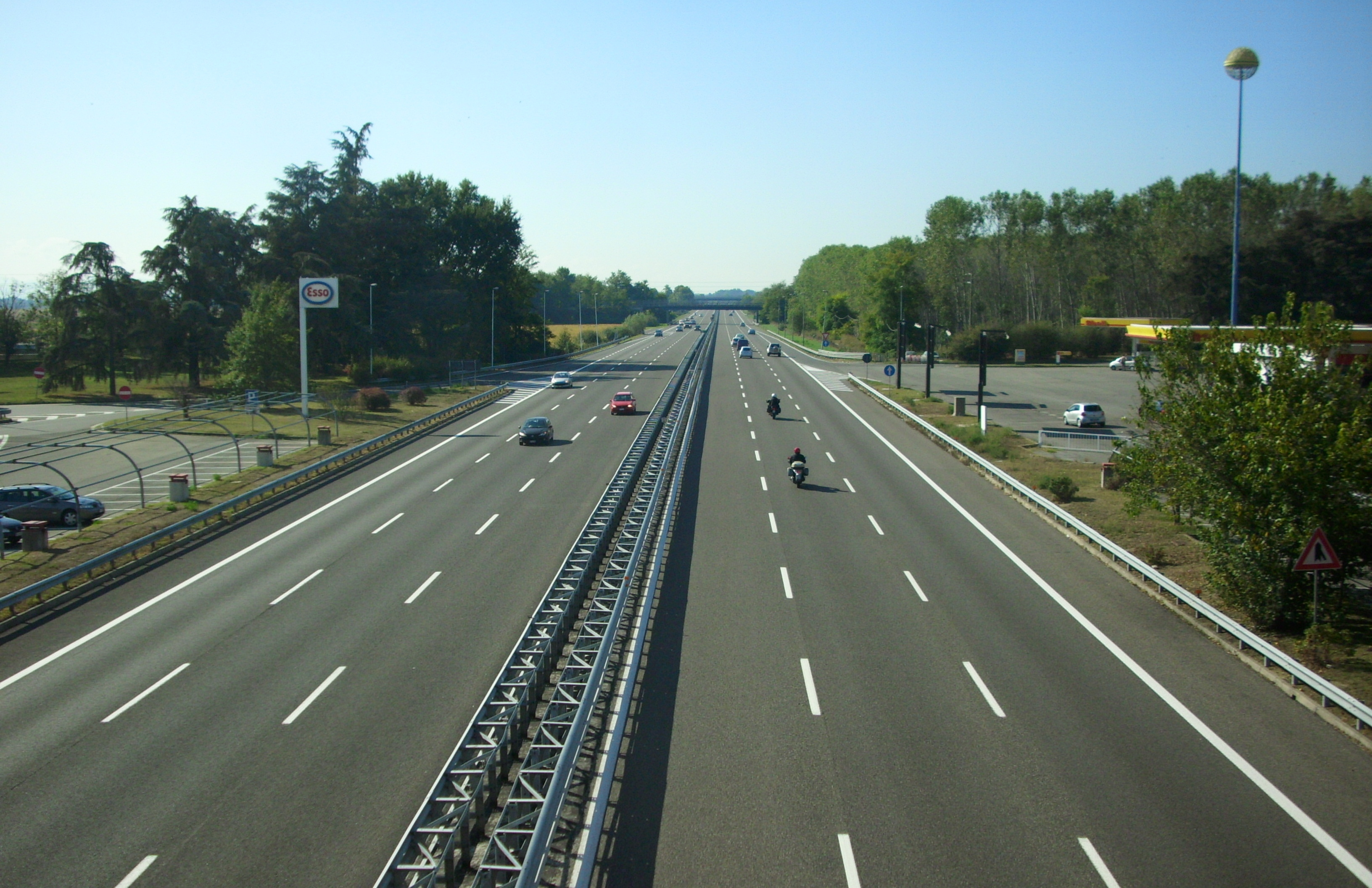
Autostrada A7 near Gropello Cairoli

=== Motorways ===
- Autostrada A7: Milan-Genoa
- Autostrada A21: Turin-Brescia

=== Railway lines ===
- Alessandria–Piacenza railway
- Milan–Genoa railway
- Pavia–Stradella railway
- Vercelli–Pavia railway
- Pavia–Alessandria railway
- Mortara–Milan railway
