= Verrua Po =

- Comune
- Comune di Verrua Po
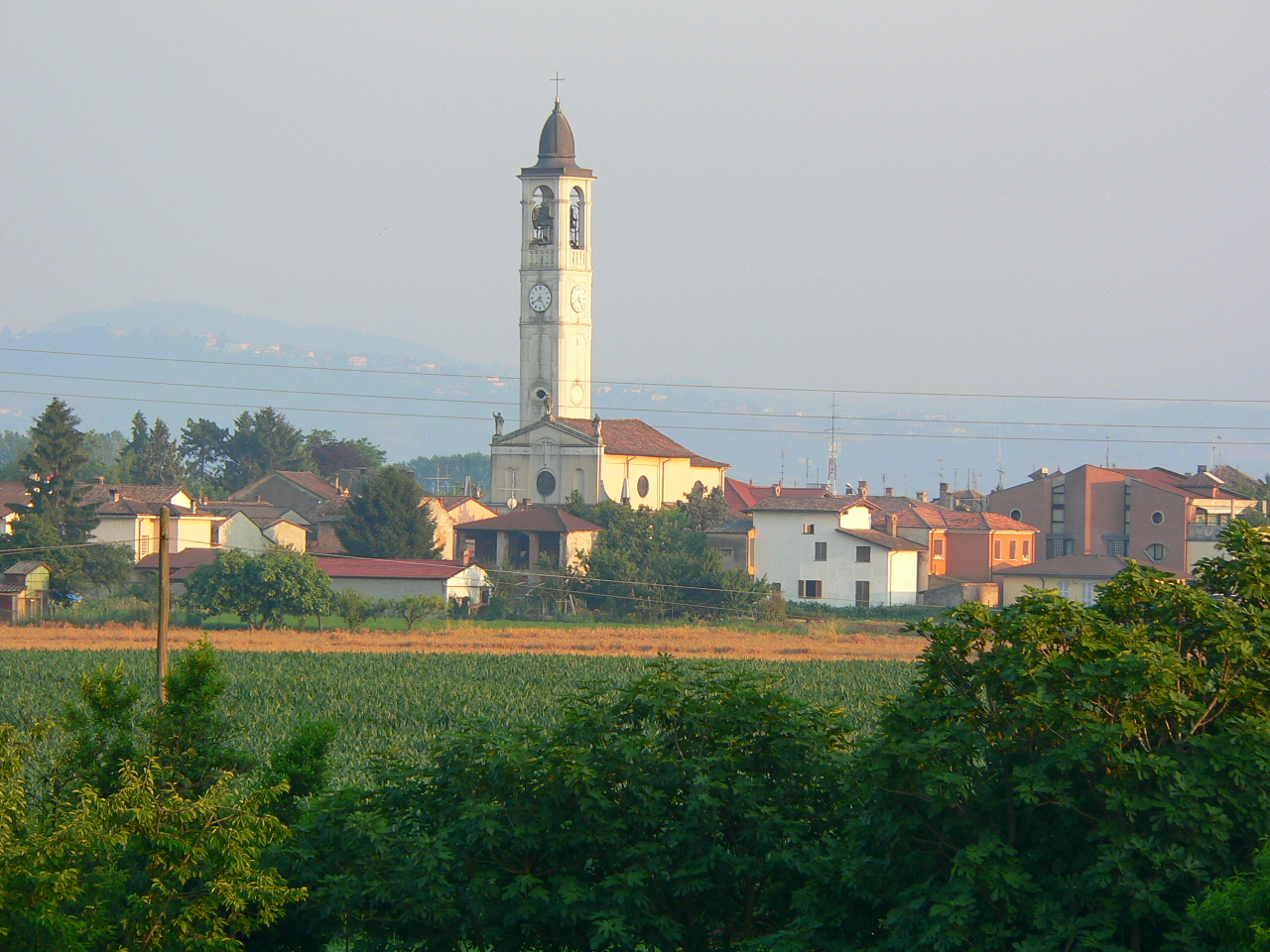

- Coat of arms
- Nickname: Vrüa : derives from the word verruca that means wart because in some roads of verrua are raised from the ground due to the floods of the po river. This nickname is written in the oltrepó dialect
- Location within Italy Location within Lombardy
- Coordinates: 45°5′N 9°8′E
- Country: Italy
- Region: Lombardy
- Province: Pavia (PV)

Government
  - Mayor: Pierangelo Lazzari (Insieme per verrua)

Area
  - Total: 11.44 km^{2} (4.42 sq mi)
- Elevation: 64 m (210 ft)

Population (1 January 2024)
  - Total: 1,185
  - Density: 103.6/km^{2} (268.3/sq mi)
- Demonym: Verruesi
- Time zone: UTC+1 (CET)
  - Summer (DST): UTC+2 (CEST)
- Postal code: 27040
- Dialing code: 0385
- Patron saint: St. John Baptist
- Saint day: 24 june
- Website: Official website

Verrua Po is a comune (municipality) in the Province of Pavia in the Italian region Lombardy, located about 45 km south of Milan and about 11 km south of Pavia. It is on the right side of the Po River; before the 1710s it was on the left side.
