= Colli Verdi =

- Comune
- Comune di Colli Verdi
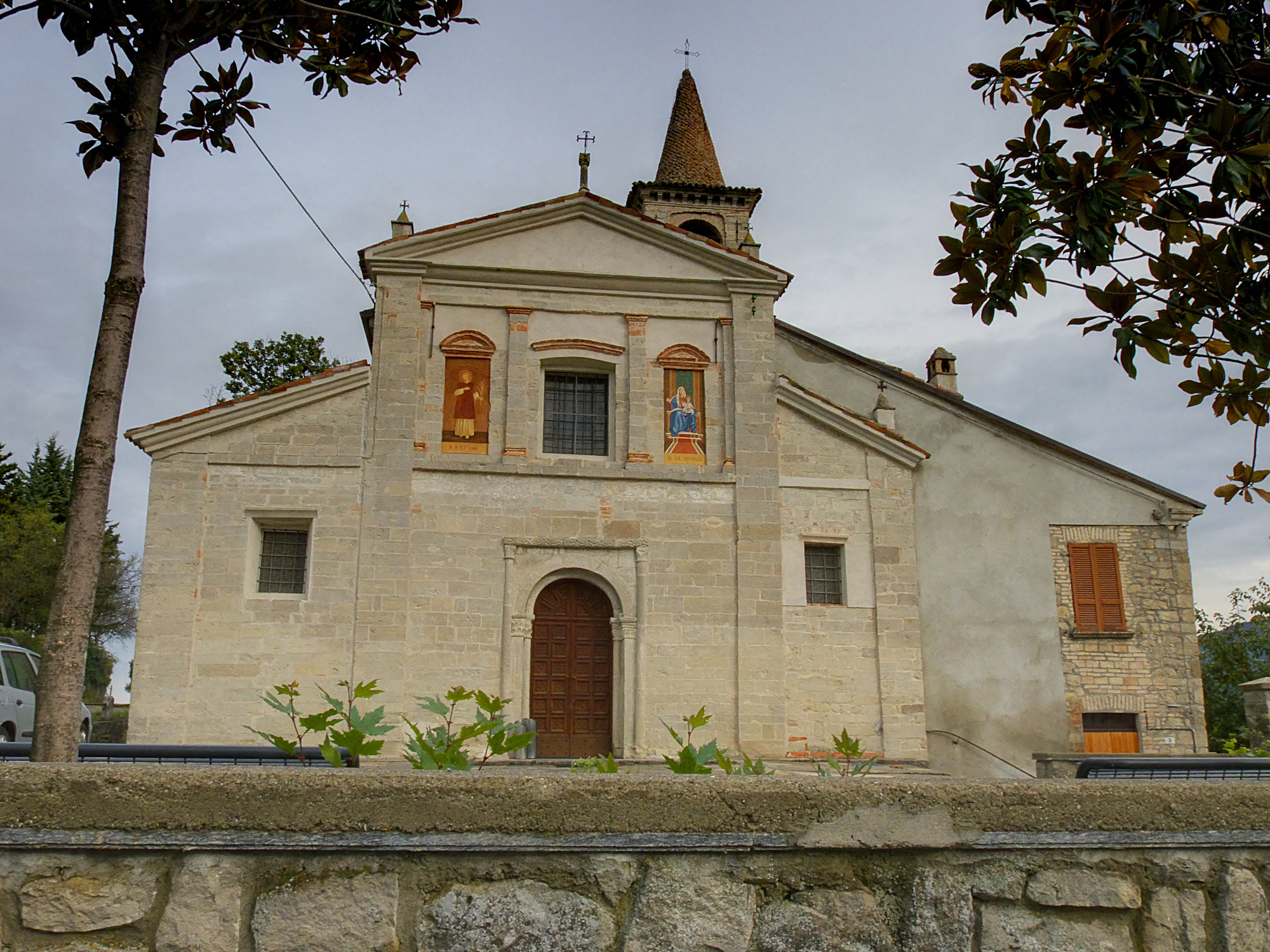

- Location within Italy Location within Lombardy
- Coordinates: 44°55′39″N 9°16′35″E
- Country: Italy
- Region: Lombardy
- Province: Pavia (PV)
- Frazioni: Bozzola, Ca del Matto, Ca del Zerbo, Calghera, Canavera, Canevino, Carmine Passo, Carmine Bivio, Casa Andrini, Casa d'Agosto, Casa Porri, Casa Zanellino, Caseo, Colombara, Costa Trentini, Fontana, Mandasco, Moglio, Mombelli, Montelungo, Montù Berchielli, Pometo, Ruino, Torre degli Alberi, Valverde

Government
  - Mayor: Sergio Lodigiani

Area
  - Total: 41.25 km^{2} (15.93 sq mi)

Population (31 August 2019)
  - Total: 1,074
  - Density: 26.04/km^{2} (67.43/sq mi)
- Time zone: UTC+1 (CET)
  - Summer (DST): UTC+2 (CEST)
- Postal code: 27061
- Dialing code: 0383, 0385

Colli Verdi is a comune (municipality) in the province of Pavia, Lombardy, northern Italy. It was formed on 1 January 2019 by the merger of the previous comuni of Canevino, Ruino and Valverde.
