= Nibbiano =

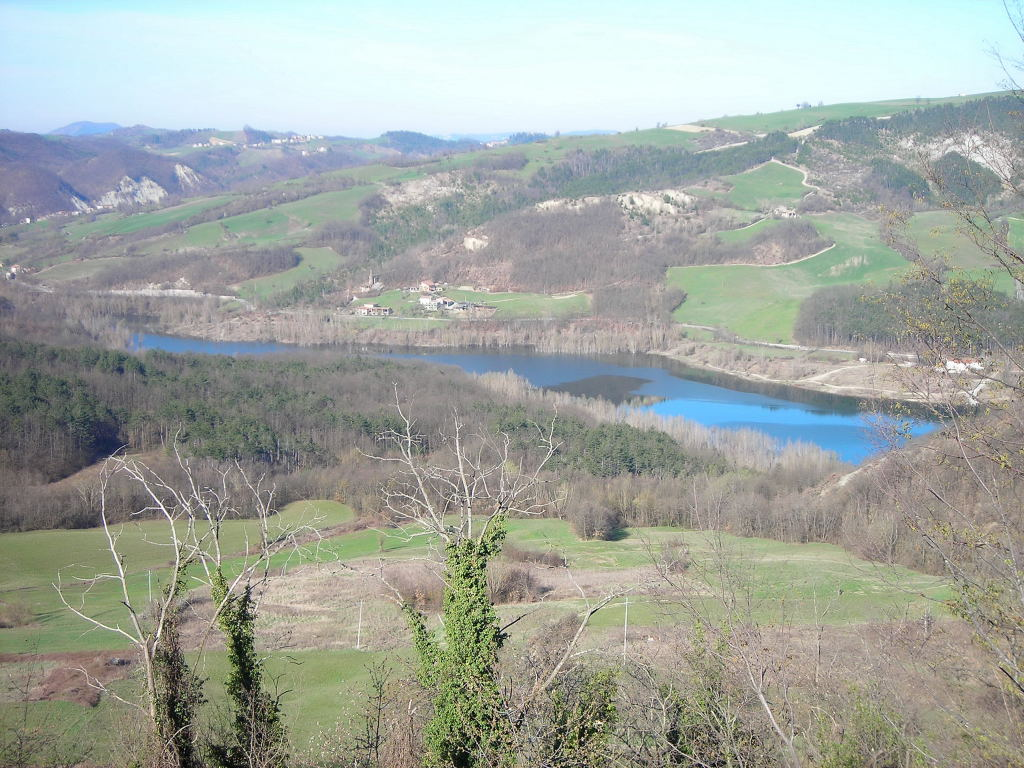
Lake of Trebecco in the area of the former comune of Nibbiano.

Nibbiano is a former comune (municipality) in the Province of Piacenza in the Italian region Emilia-Romagna. On 1 January, it was merged with Caminata and Pecorara into the new comune of Alta Val Tidone.

Nibbiano was founded as a castle, whose first known mention is in 1029 document. The nearby castle of Trebecco is mentioned for the first time in 971.

Due to the risk of landslides, Camerino, part of the village, might have to relocate as of 2024.

== See also ==
- Earthquakes in Italy
