= Castello di Montesegale =

Coordinates: 44.9072°N 9.1264°E

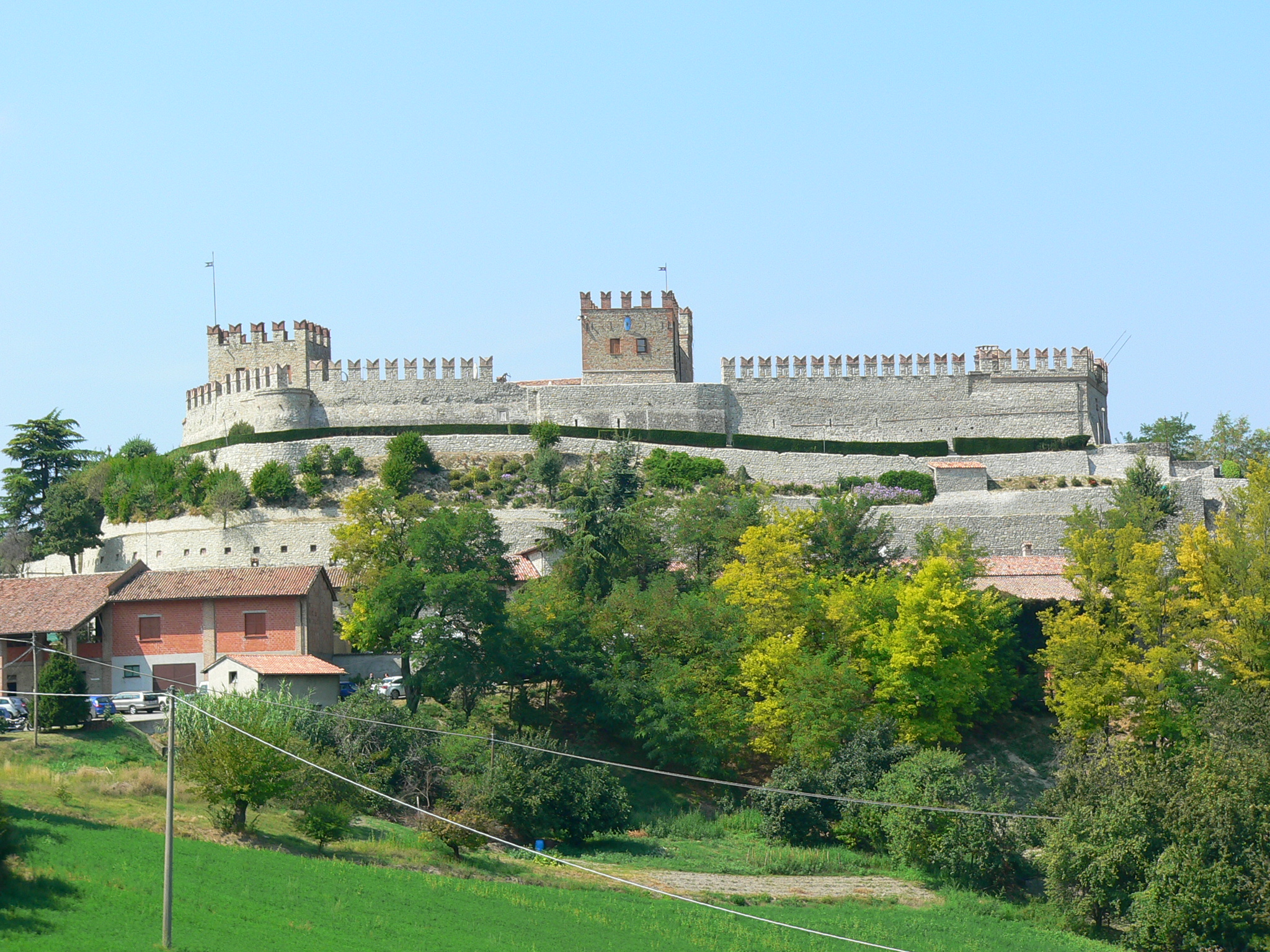
The Montesegale castle

The Castello di Montesegale or Castle of Montesegale is a rural hilltop medieval fortress in the hamlet of Montesegale, Province of Pavia, region of Lombardy, Italy.

== History ==
The castle was originally built in the 14th century but over the next centuries was destroyed and rebuilt. An earlier 11th-century tower may have existed at the site.

Documents from 1164 indicate that Emperor Federico Barbarossa conceded a castle or fortress at Montesegale to Pavia. The property was owned by the Count Gambarana by 1311, who became the lord of Montesegale. In 1415, in retribution for a rebellion against Filippo Maria Visconti, his general Carmagnola captured and destroyed the castle. Count Guido Gambarana was captured, tortured, and executed. In 1451, Palatine Count Ottino Gambarana, the son of Guido, obtained from Duke Francesco Sforza restoration of his feudal inheritance. The position of the counts of Montesegale was confirmed by Emperor Charles V in 1525. The property passed on the Giussani family in 19th century, and then to the Jannuzzelli family.

The castle has outer walls and an inner walled keep. The interior walls were restored in 1900 by Agostino Gambarotta. The portal to the inner courtyard has a Latin epigraph that reads "Fiat pax in virtute tua et habondantia in turribus tuis" (Psalms 121:7 [Vulgate]: "May there be peace in your strength and prosperity within your towers"). The castle portico has heraldic shields of the Gambarana family.

In 1975, the castle became the site of the local museum of contemporary art.
