= Alta Val Tidone =

- Comune
- Comune di Alta Val Tidone
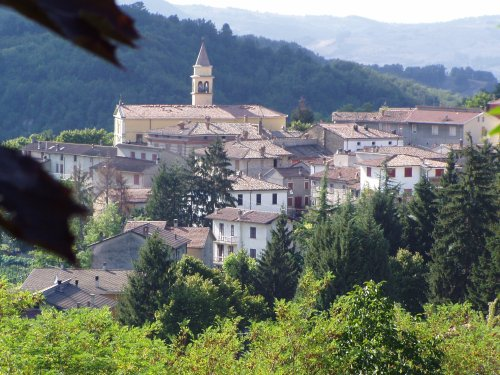
- View of Pecorara, one of the town in the comune.

- Location of Alta Val Tidone in Italy Alta Val Tidone (Emilia-Romagna)
- Coordinates: 44°54′18″N 9°19′35″E
- Country: Italy
- Region: Emilia-Romagna
- Province: Piacenza (PC)
- Frazioni: Caminata, Nibbiano Pecorara

Government
  - Mayor: Franco Albertini

Area
  - Total: 100.87 km^{2} (38.95 sq mi)
- Elevation: 284 m (932 ft)

Population (31 December 2016)
  - Total: 3,148
  - Density: 31.21/km^{2} (80.83/sq mi)
- Time zone: UTC+1 (CET)
  - Summer (DST): UTC+2 (CEST)
- Dialing code: 0523
- Website: Official website

Alta Val Tidone is a new comune (municipality) in the Province of Piacenza in the Italian region of Emilia-Romagna, located about 180 kilometres (110 mi) northwest of Bologna and approximately 30 kilometres (19 mi) southwest of Piacenza.

Alta Val Tidone borders the following municipalities: Bobbio, Borgonovo Val Tidone, Canevino, Golferenzo, Pianello Val Tidone, Piozzano, Romagnese, Ruino, Santa Maria della Versa, Travo, Volpara, Zavattarello, Ziano Piacentino

It was established on 1 January 2018 by the merger of Caminata, Nibbiano and Pecorara.
