= Lirio, Lombardy =

Lirio
- Comune
- Comune di Lirio
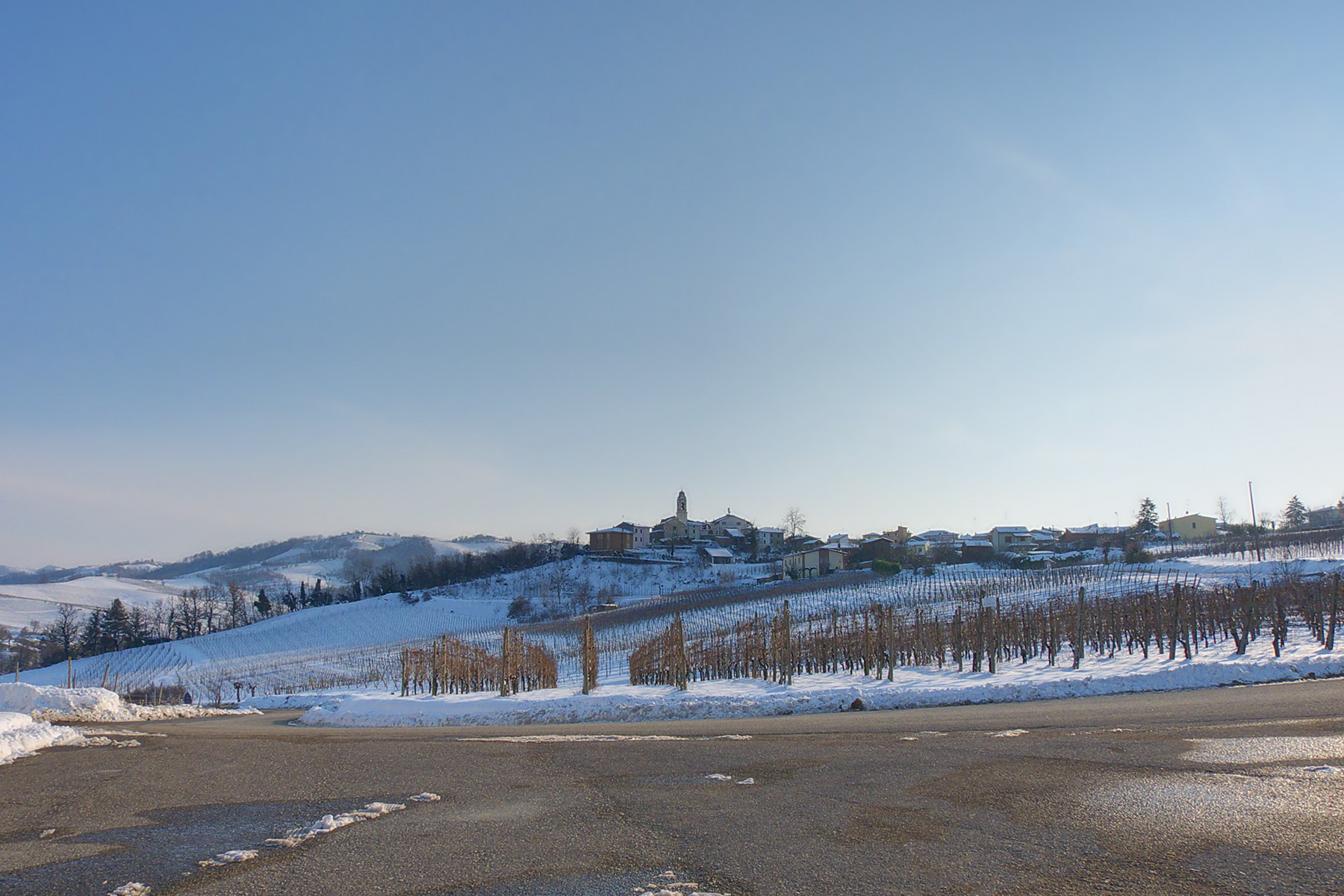

- Location within Italy Location within Lombardy
- Coordinates: 45°0′N 9°15′E
- Country: Italy
- Region: Lombardy
- Province: Province of Pavia (PV)

Area
  - Total: 1.7 km^{2} (0.66 sq mi)

Population (Dec. 2004)
  - Total: 153
  - Density: 90/km^{2} (230/sq mi)
- Time zone: UTC+1 (CET)
  - Summer (DST): UTC+2 (CEST)
- Postal code: 27043
- Dialing code: 0385

Lirio is a former comune (municipality) in the Province of Pavia in the Italian region Lombardy, located about 50 km (31 mi) south of Milan and about 20 km (12 mi) southeast of Pavia. As of 31 December 2004, it had a population of 153 and an area of 1.7 km^{2} (0.66 sq mi).

Lirio bordered the following municipalities: Montalto Pavese, Montecalvo Versiggia, Pietra de' Giorgi, Santa Maria della Versa.

On 31 January 2026, it was annexed to the Montalto Pavese comune.

== Demographic evolution ==
Historical population

Year	Pop.	±%
1861	424	—
1871	479	+13.0%
1881	490	+2.3%
1901	520	+6.1%
1911	585	+12.5%

Year	Pop.	±%
1921	548	−6.3%
1931	499	−8.9%
1936	510	+2.2%
1951	408	−20.0%
1961	327	−19.9%

Year	Pop.	±%
1971	234	−28.4%
1981	202	−13.7%
1991	167	−17.3%
2001	147	−12.0%

Source: Data from ISTAT
