= Borgo Priolo =

- Comune
- Comune di Borgo Priolo
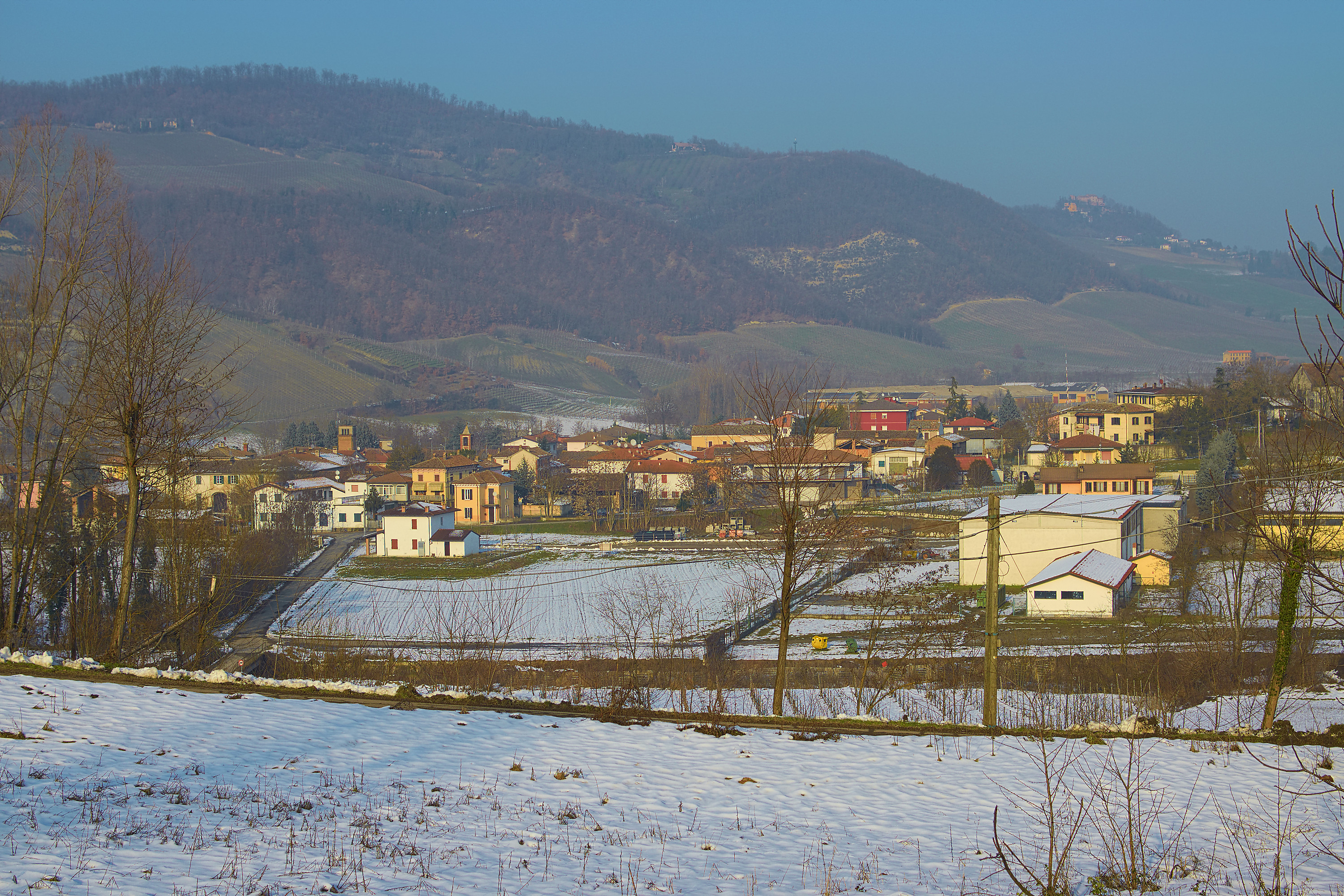
- View of Borgo Priolo

- Location within Italy Location within Lombardy
- Coordinates: 44°58′N 9°9′E
- Country: Italy
- Region: Lombardy
- Province: Province of Pavia (PV)

Area
  - Total: 29.0 km^{2} (11.2 sq mi)

Population (Dec. 2004)
  - Total: 1,399
  - Density: 48.2/km^{2} (125/sq mi)
- Time zone: UTC+1 (CET)
  - Summer (DST): UTC+2 (CEST)
- Postal code: 27040
- Dialing code: 0383

Borgo Priolo is a comune (municipality) in the Province of Pavia in the Italian region Lombardy, located about 60 km (37 mi) south of Milan and about 25 km (16 mi) south of Pavia. As of 31 December 2004, it had a population of 1,399 and an area of 29.0 km^{2} (11.2 sq mi).

Borgo Priolo borders the following municipalities: Borgoratto Mormorolo, Calvignano, Casteggio, Fortunago, Montalto Pavese, Montebello della Battaglia, Montesegale, Rocca Susella, Torrazza Coste.

Historical population

Year	Pop.	±%
1861	1,739	—
1871	1,969	+13.2%
1881	1,978	+0.5%
1901	2,210	+11.7%
1911	2,475	+12.0%

Year	Pop.	±%
1921	2,496	+0.8%
1931	2,429	−2.7%
1936	2,242	−7.7%
1951	2,089	−6.8%
1961	1,837	−12.1%

Year	Pop.	±%
1971	1,562	−15.0%
1981	1,450	−7.2%
1991	1,447	−0.2%
2001	1,405	−2.9%

Source: Data from ISTAT
