= Santa Maria della Versa =

Santa Maria della Versa La Madòna
- Comune
- Comune di Santa Maria della Versa
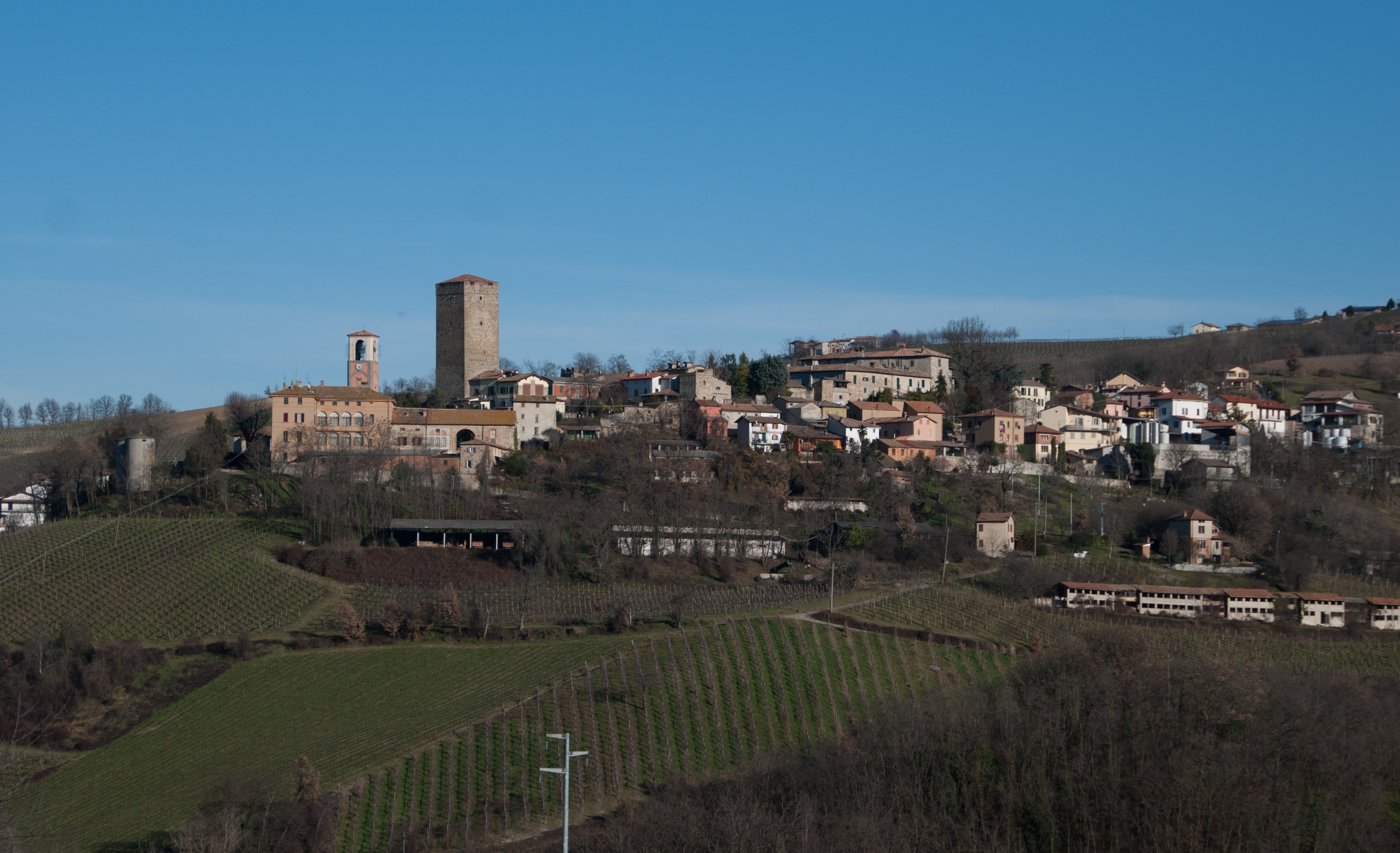
- The frazione of Soriasco.

- Location within Italy Location within Lombardy
- Coordinates: 44°59′N 9°18′E
- Country: Italy
- Region: Lombardy
- Province: Pavia (PV)

Government
  - Mayor: Maurizio Ordali

Area
  - Total: 18.48 km^{2} (7.14 sq mi)
- Elevation: 199 m (653 ft)

Population (31 December 2015)
  - Total: 2,430
  - Density: 131/km^{2} (341/sq mi)
- Demonym: Mariesi
- Time zone: UTC+1 (CET)
  - Summer (DST): UTC+2 (CEST)
- Postal code: 27047
- Dialing code: 0385
- Website: Official website

Santa Maria della Versa (Lombard: La Madòna) is a comune (municipality) in the Province of Pavia in the Italian region Lombardy, located about 50 km south of Milan and about 25 km southeast of Pavia.

Santa Maria della Versa borders the following municipalities: Alta Val Tidone, Castana, Golferenzo, Lirio, Montecalvo Versiggia, Montù Beccaria, Pietra de' Giorgi, Rovescala, Ziano Piacentino.
