= Canneto Pavese =

- Comune
- Comune di Canneto Pavese
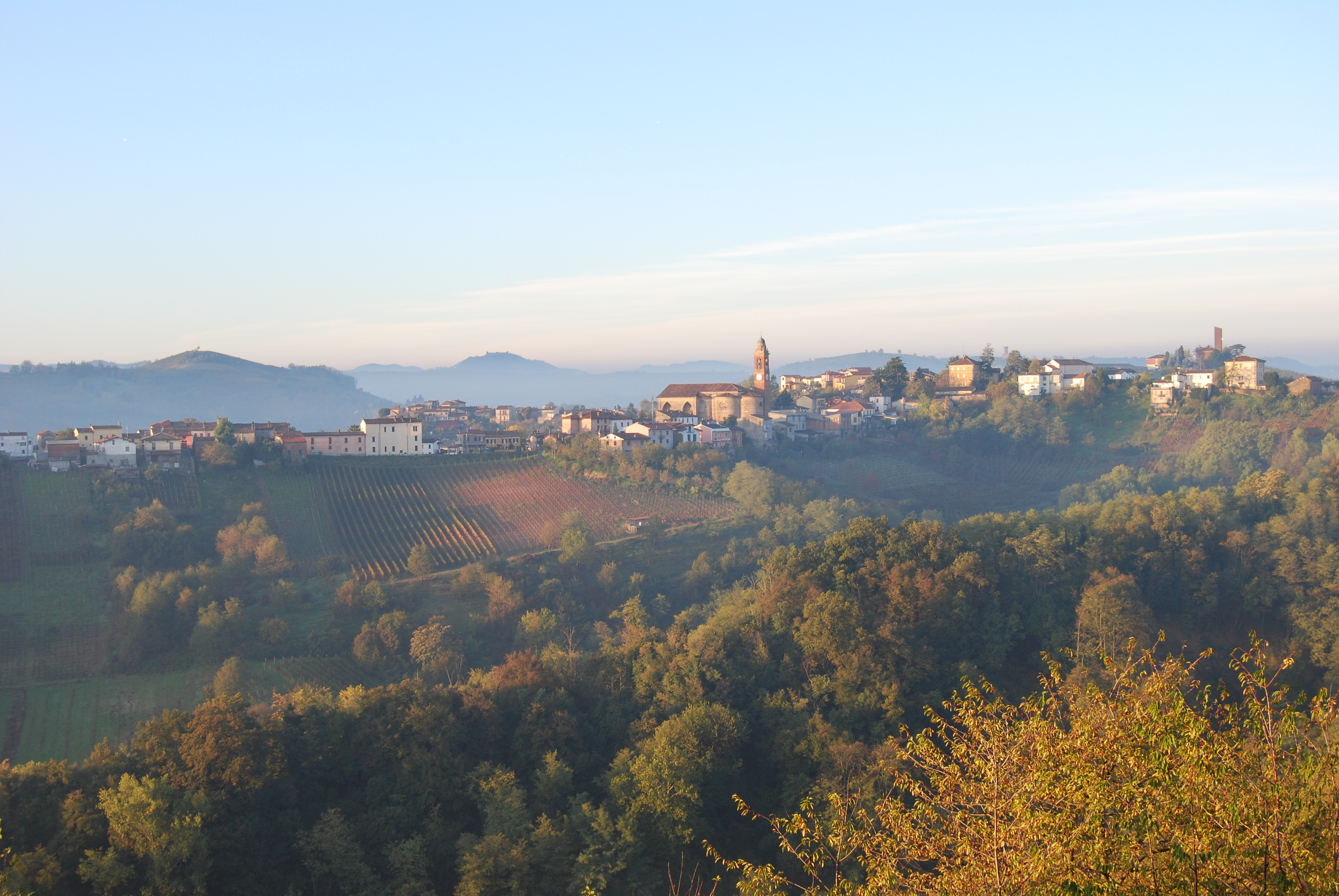

- Location within Italy Location within Lombardy
- Coordinates: 45°3′N 9°17′E
- Country: Italy
- Region: Lombardy
- Province: Pavia (PV)

Government
  - Mayor: Francesca Panizzari

Area
  - Total: 5.81 km^{2} (2.24 sq mi)
- Elevation: 233 m (764 ft)

Population (Dec. 2004)
  - Total: 1,428
  - Density: 246/km^{2} (637/sq mi)
- Demonym: Cannetesi
- Time zone: UTC+1 (CET)
  - Summer (DST): UTC+2 (CEST)
- Postal code: 27044
- Dialing code: 0385
- Website: Official website

Canneto Pavese is a comune (municipality) in the Province of Pavia in the Italian region of Lombardy, located about 45 km (28 mi) south of Milan and about 20 km (12 mi) southeast of Pavia.

Canneto Pavese borders the following municipalities: Broni, Castana, Cigognola, Montescano, Montù Beccaria, Stradella.
