= Volpara =

- Comune
- Comune di Volpara

- Location within Italy Location within Lombardy
- Coordinates: 44°57′N 9°18′E
- Country: Italy
- Region: Lombardy
- Province: Pavia (PV)

Government
  - Mayor: Matteo Bossi

Area
  - Total: 3.77 km^{2} (1.46 sq mi)
- Elevation: 357 m (1,171 ft)

Population (31 December 2010)
  - Total: 129
  - Density: 34.2/km^{2} (88.6/sq mi)
- Demonym: Volparesi
- Time zone: UTC+1 (CET)
  - Summer (DST): UTC+2 (CEST)
- Postal code: 27047
- Dialing code: 0385
- Website: Official website

Volpara is a comune (municipality) in the Province of Pavia in the Italian region Lombardy, located about 60 km south of Milan and about 30 km southeast of Pavia.

Volpara borders the following municipalities: Alta Val Tidone, Canevino, Golferenzo, Montecalvo Versiggia.
