= CS Minia =

Halifax Cable Ship notable for its retrieval of Titanic victim's bodies

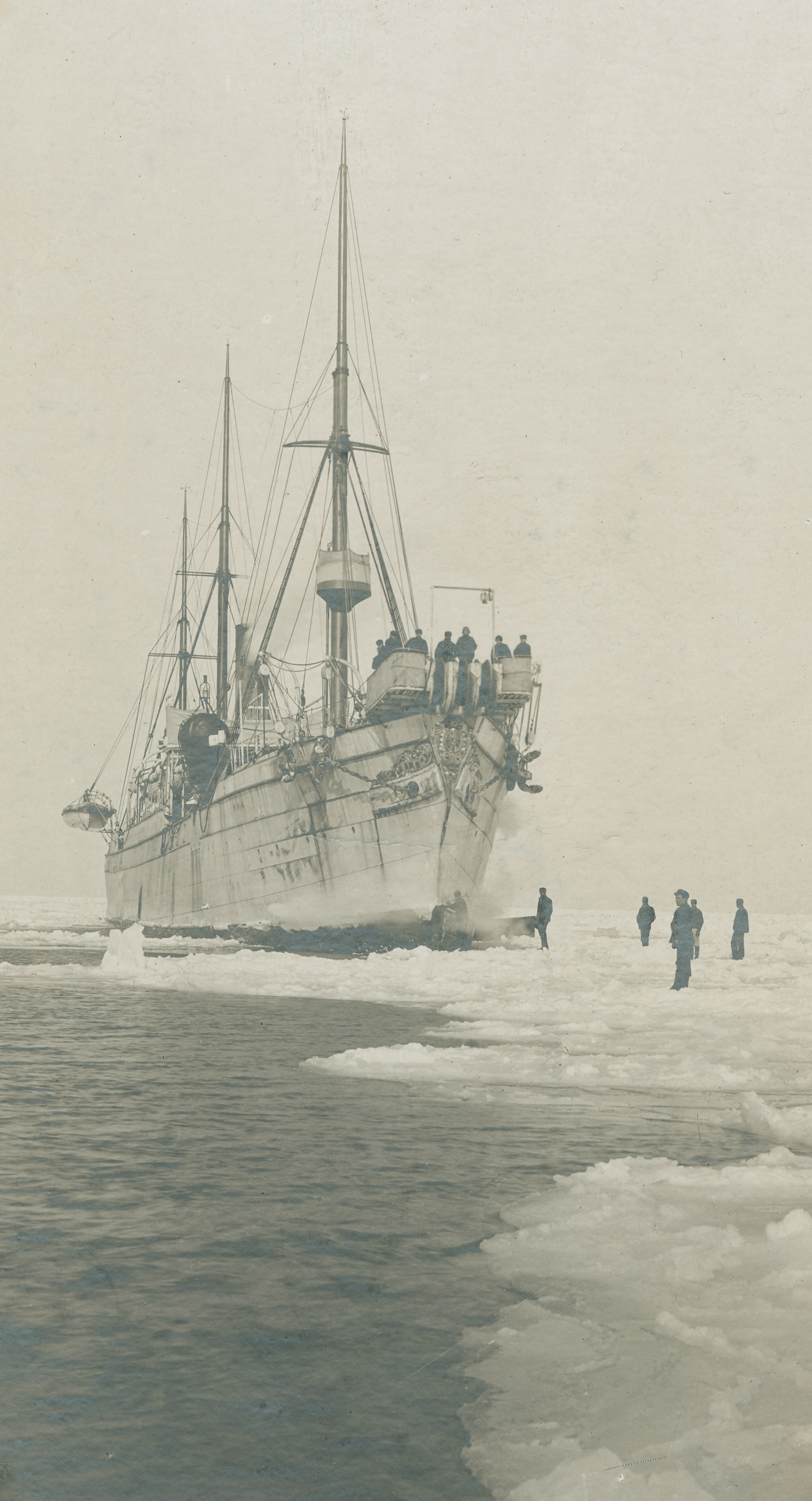
- CS Minia around 1905

History

United Kingdom
- Name: Minia
- Operator: Western Union (1866–1871); Telegraph Construction and Maintenance Company (1871–1874); Atlantic Telegraph Company (1874–1912); Western Union (1912–1922)
- Port of registry: London, England
- Builder: London and Glasgow Shipbuilding Company, Glasgow
- Laid down: 1866
- Launched: 12 July 1866
- Completed: 1866
- Acquired: 1866
- In service: 1866
- Out of service: 1922
- Identification: Official number: 56762
- Fate: Scrapped in 1922
- Notes: Call letters: HRJL

General characteristics
- Type: Cable ship
- Tonnage: 2,061 GRT
- Length: 100.1 m (328 ft 5 in)
- Beam: 10.87 m (35 ft 8 in)
- Depth: 7.65 m (25 ft 1 in)

CS Minia was a British transatlantic cable-laying and cable-repair ship that is most notable for being the second ship that was chartered by the White Star Line to recover the bodies of the victims of the sinking of RMS Titanic.

== Construction ==
Minia was launched on 12 July 1866 at the London and Glasgow Shipbuilding Company shipyard in Glasgow, United Kingdom, and completed later that same year. The ship was 100.1 metres (328 ft 5 in) long, with a beam of 10.87 metres (35 ft 8 in) and a depth of 7.65 metres (25 ft 1 in). The ship was assessed at 2,061 gross register tons (GRT) and possessed three masts and one funnel.

== Early career ==
After five years of service with Western Union, Minia was sold to the Telegraph Construction and Maintenance Company in 1871 and converted to a cable-laying vessel. Minia was originally fitted for shallow water work and under the command of Captain J. H. Martin completed several cable-laying operations alongside other vessels which included a connection between Saigon and Hong Kong in 1871, between Porthcurno, Vigo and Lisbon in 1873, between Jamaica, Puerto Rico and Saint Croix in 1874 and the end of the Atlantic cable at Newfoundland shore also in 1874. After these operations, Minia was sold to the Atlantic Telegraph Company and refitted for deep water cable repairs. The ship completed a total of 120 cable repairs in the ten year period from 1885 to 1895, most of those in the Atlantic Ocean. Minia was leased to Western Union (her original owner) in 1912.

== Titanic disaster ==
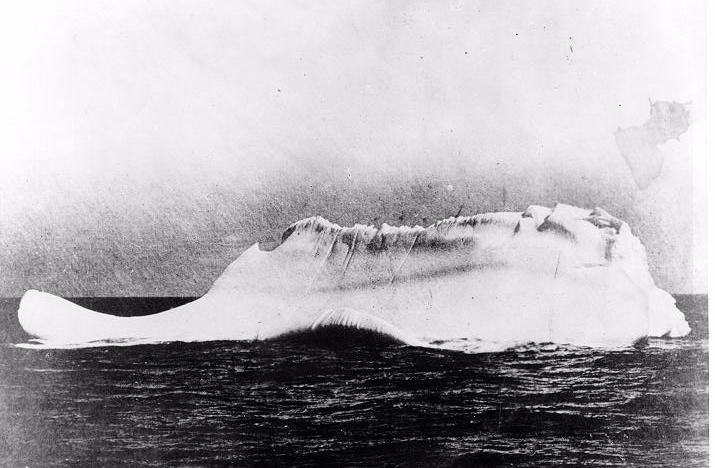
Picture of an iceberg taken by Minia Captain William Squares DeCarteret who believed this to be the iceberg that sank RMS Titanic upon arriving at her wrecksite on 26 April 1912.

Minia was sailing towards Halifax, Nova Scotia, Canada on 15 April 1912 when RMS Titanic struck an iceberg and sank in the Atlantic Ocean with great loss of life while she was travelling to New York. RMS Carpathia picked up all 712 survivors of the sinking of RMS Titanic and made way for New York. However, at that time, the true scale of the Titanic disaster was not known yet to the people on land, and many hoped that the nearly 1,500 missing passengers and crew of Titanic had been saved by another ship that was near the disaster site. After it was revealed that two ships who were thought to carry the many missing, SS Parisian and RMS Virginian, had not been able to reach Titanic's position before she sank, all hope was settled on Minia being the rumoured second rescue ship. However, when Minia arrived at Halifax on 17 April 1912, awaited by members of the press, it was revealed that the ship had not been within 400 miles of Titanic's wrecksite and therefore had not picked up any more survivors, meaning that all those who weren't rescued by the Carpathia had been lost. By this time, the cable ship Mackay-Bennett was chartered by the White Star Line (owner of the lost Titanic) to recover the bodies of the Titanic's dead. The recovery ship departed from Halifax that same day.

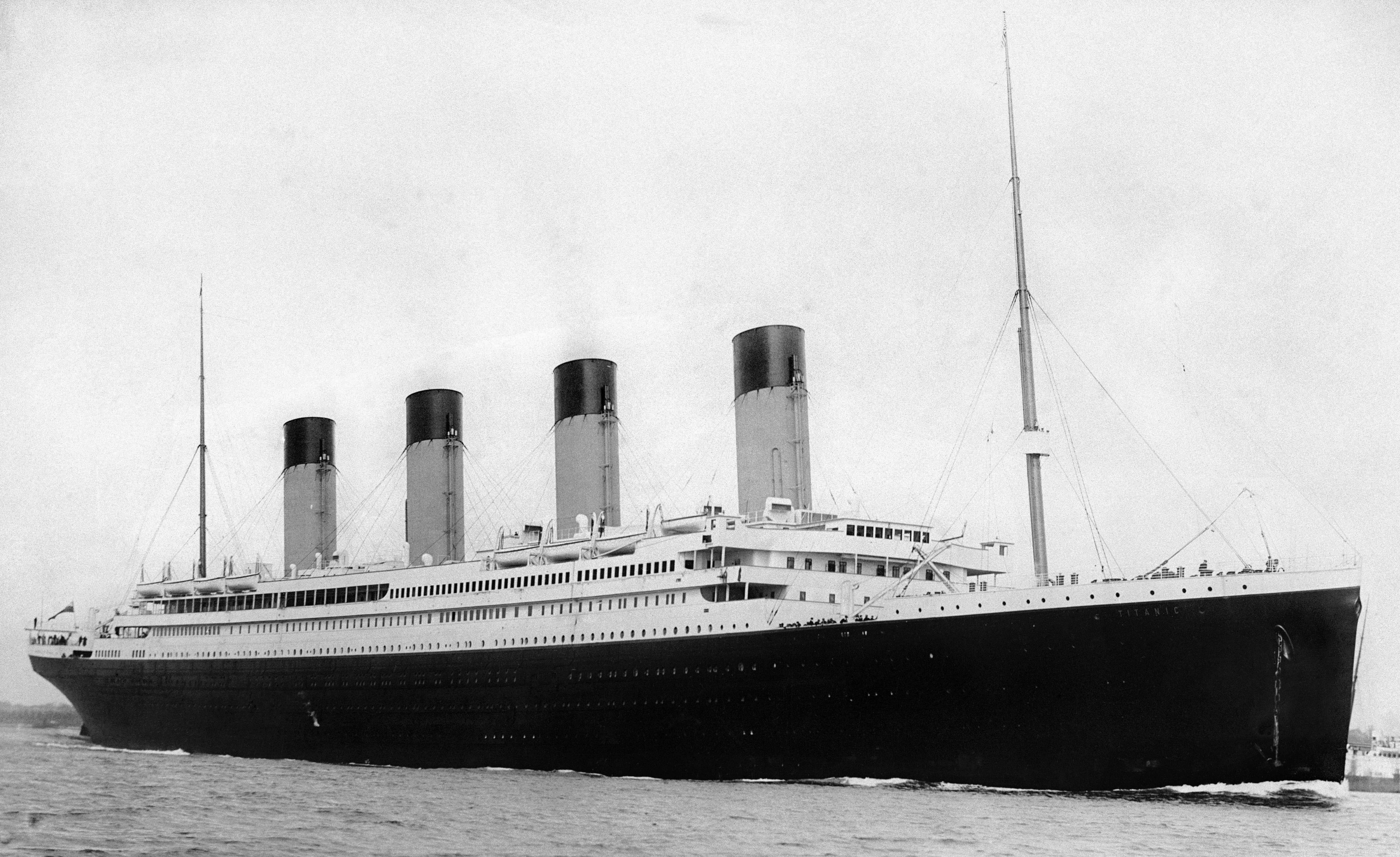
RMS Titanic on 10 April 1912.

=== Recovery of bodies ===
As it had become clear that there were more bodies than Mackay-Bennet could handle as soon as she arrived at the wrecksite, Minia was chartered by the White Star Line to recover additional bodies on 22 April 1912. Minia, under the command of Captain William George Squares deCarteret, was loaded with 150 coffins, 20 tons of ice and 10 tons of grate iron and departed Halifax within hours of being chartered, leaving in such a haste that there had not even been time to unload the ship's cable. Also on board this recovery mission were the Anglican priest Henry Ward Cunningham, embalmer William H. Snow and assistant undertaker and surgeon Will Mosher. Minia reached Titanic's wrecksite on 26 April and joined up with Mackay-Bennet. Mackay-Bennet sent a lifeboat to Minia in order to retrieve more supplies such as embalming fluid before Mackay-Bennet made her way back to Halifax having recovered hundreds of bodies. Minia's crew were shocked by the amount of debris that was present at the wrecksite, making them believe that Titanic had exploded as she sank as much of the wreckage seemed to have come from below deck and 1.22-metre (4 ft 0 in) thick main deck planks were split and broken. Many wreckage was recovered such as pieces of Titanic's aft Grand Staircase and First Class Smoking Room, several deck chairs, cabinets, Titanic's wheelhouse door and various pieces of shattered paneling. Some of these recovered wreckage pieces were kept by Minia's crew as memorabilia and some wooden wreckage was refurbished into things like picture frames by Minia's chief carpenter William Parker. Some of the recovered wreckage is at display in the Maritime Museum of the Atlantic in Halifax.

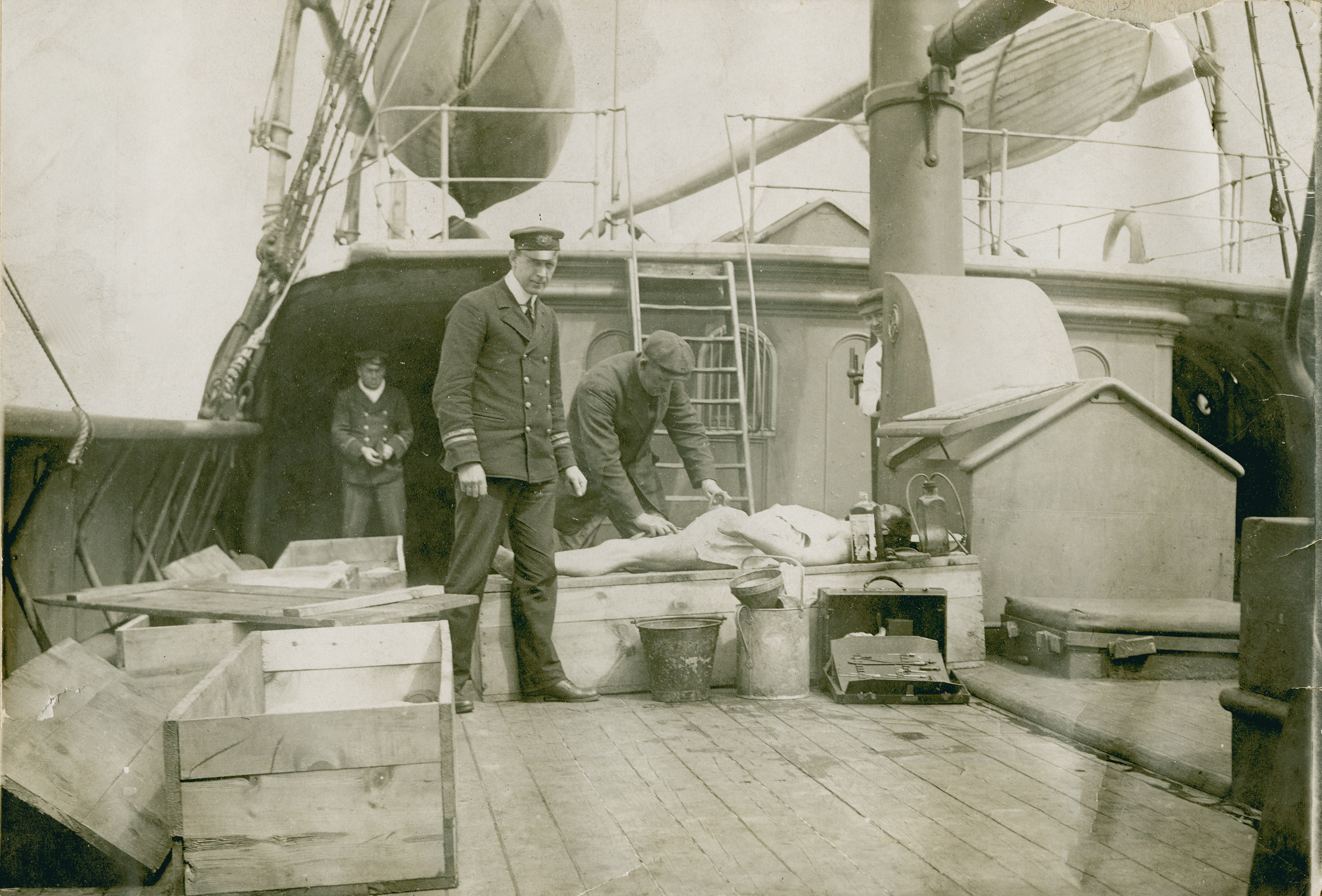
A recovered body being embalmed aboard Minia.

Minia recovered her first body the same day she arrived at the wrecksite. The victim (body no.307) was identified as First Class passenger and Grand Trunk Railway president Charles Melville Hays. Minia's wireless operator Francis Dyke relayed the information of the recovery of Mr. Hays' body to Halifax so the news could reach the Grand Trunk Railway offices, which would send a private railcar to pick up the body once Minia would return to Halifax.

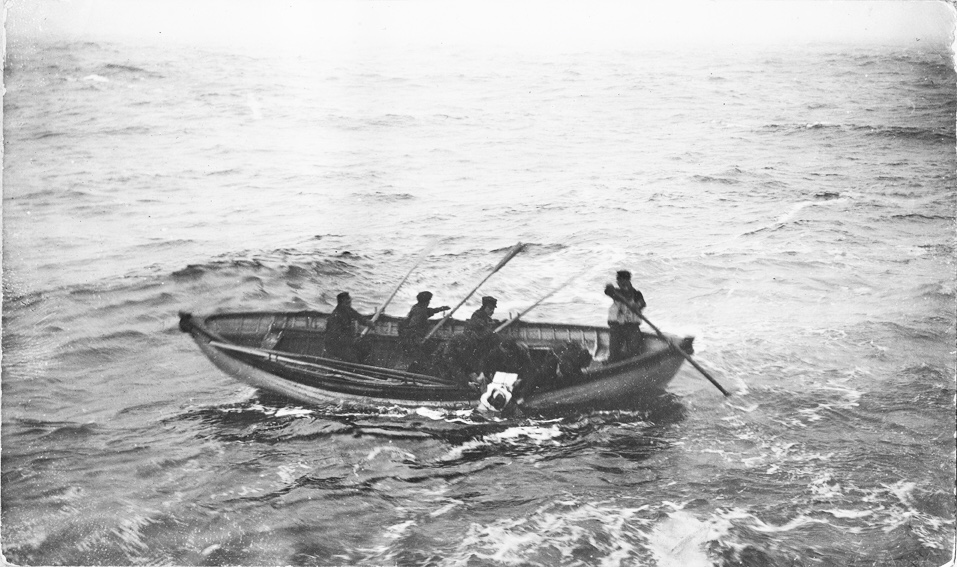
Victim being recovered

The search for bodies was hampered by bad weather and the fact that bodies were spread out too far, which resulted in Minia only retrieving 17 bodies, including Hays and restaurant manager Luigi Gatti, (body numbers 307 to 323) following a week of searching. Two of the recovered bodies were buried at sea as they were both unidentified firemen who were in too bad of a condition to be preserved. On 3 May 1912, Minia began her voyage back to Halifax with the 15 bodies she had recovered, arriving there on 6 May. All bodies were send to the temporary morgue at the ice rink of the local Mayflower Curling Club to be placed along the already recovered Titanic victims from Mackay-Bennet for identification, save for the body of Charles Melville Hays which was picked up by his private railcar Canada to be brought to Montreal for burial. The railcar is still preserved and on display at the Canadian Railway Museum near Delson, Quebec. All of Minia's unused coffins and embalming fluid were transferred over to CGS Montmagny, which became the third ship that was set out to search for additional bodies but would only recover three more victims.

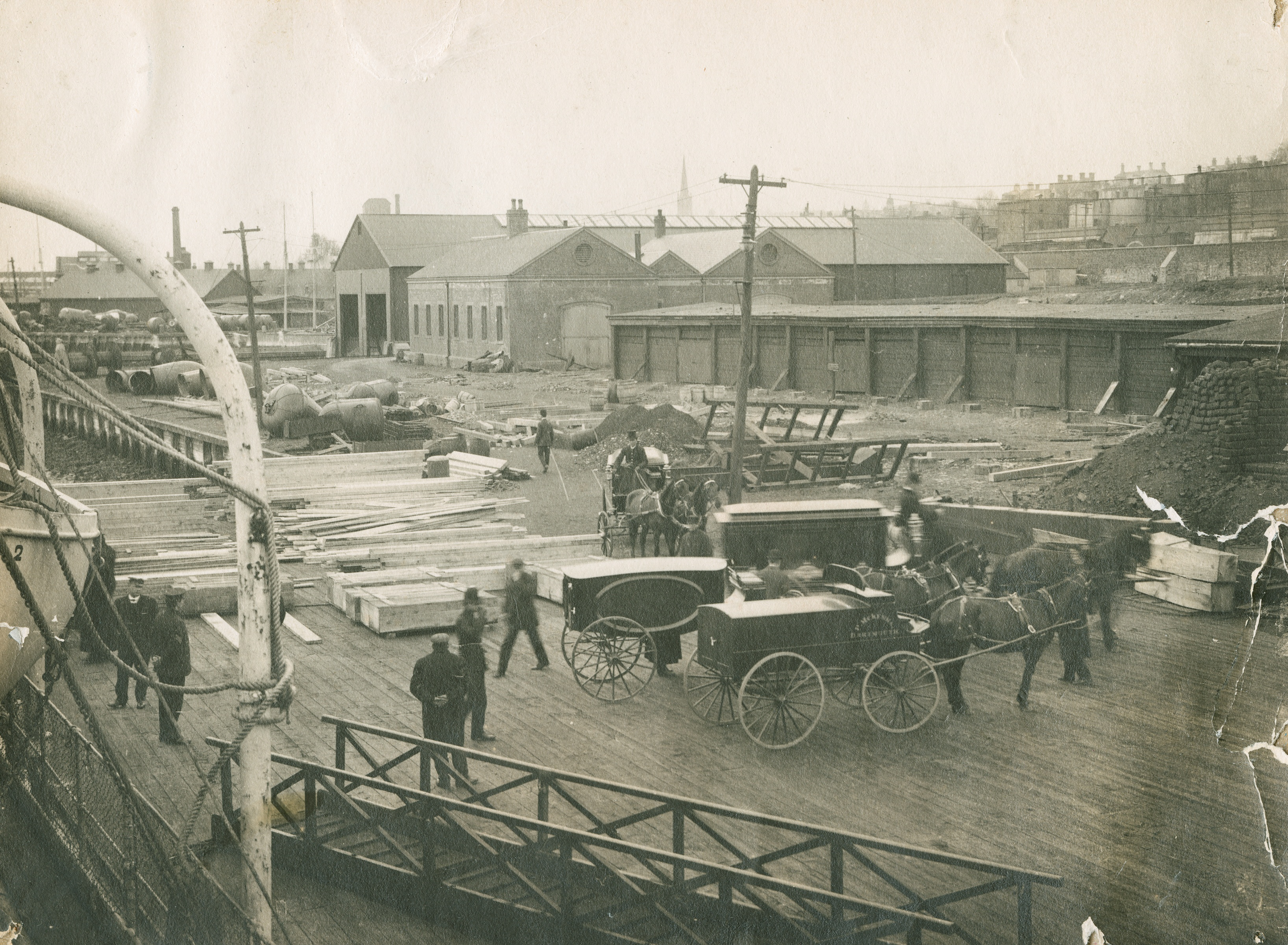
Hearses lined up on Halifax wharf to carry RMS Titanic victims to funeral parlours upon the arrival of Minia on 6 May 1912.

== Final years ==
Minia remained in service until she was sold for scrap in 1922, having laid 50,000 nautical miles worth of cable and having repaired many more cables around the world by that time.
