= Zavattarello =

- Comune
- Comune di Zavattarello
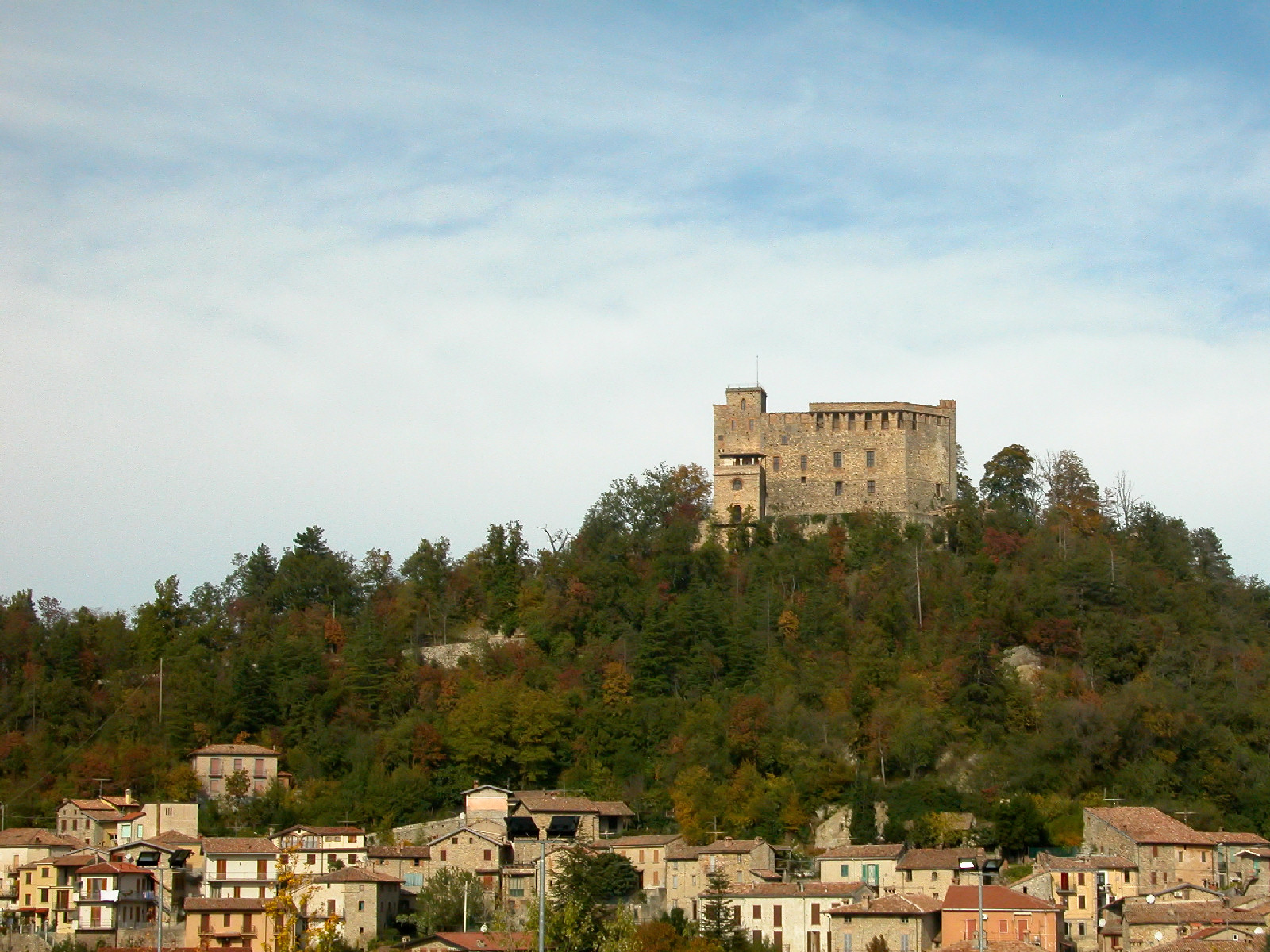
- View of Zavattarello Castle

- Location within Italy Location within Lombardy
- Coordinates: 44°52′N 9°16′E
- Country: Italy
- Region: Lombardy
- Province: Pavia (PV)

Government
  - Mayor: Simone Tiglio

Area
  - Total: 28.4 km^{2} (11.0 sq mi)
- Elevation: 600 m (2,000 ft)

Population (31 December 2015)
  - Total: 991
  - Density: 34.9/km^{2} (90.4/sq mi)
- Demonym: Zavattarellesi
- Time zone: UTC+1 (CET)
  - Summer (DST): UTC+2 (CEST)
- Postal code: 27059
- Dialing code: 0383
- Website: Official website

Zavattarello is a comune (municipality) in the Province of Pavia in the Italian region Lombardy, located about 70 km south of Milan and about 35 km south of Pavia. Zavattarello borders the following municipalities: Alta Val Tidone, Menconico, Romagnese, Ruino, Valverde, Varzi.

It is one of I Borghi più belli d'Italia ("The most beautiful villages of Italy"). The main sights is the castle, also known as Castello Del Verme, which overlooks the town. It once housed the war school of Italian Renaissance condottiero Jacopo Dal Verme.
