= Montescano =

- Comune
- Comune di Montescano
- Location within Italy Location within Lombardy
- Coordinates: 45°2′N 9°18′E
- Country: Italy
- Region: Lombardy
- Province: Pavia (PV)

Government
  - Mayor: Enrica Brega

Area
  - Total: 2.4 km^{2} (0.93 sq mi)
- Elevation: 208 m (682 ft)

Population (Dec. 2004)
  - Total: 384
  - Density: 160/km^{2} (410/sq mi)
- Demonym: Montescanesi
- Time zone: UTC+1 (CET)
  - Summer (DST): UTC+2 (CEST)
- Postal code: 27040
- Dialing code: 0385
- Website: Official website

Montescano is a comune (municipality) in the Province of Pavia in the Italian region Lombardy, located about 50 km (31 mi) south of Milan and about 20 km (12 mi) southeast of Pavia.

Montescano borders the following municipalities: Canneto Pavese, Castana, Montù Beccaria.
