= Borgoratto Mormorolo =

- Comune
- Comune di Borgoratto Mormorolo
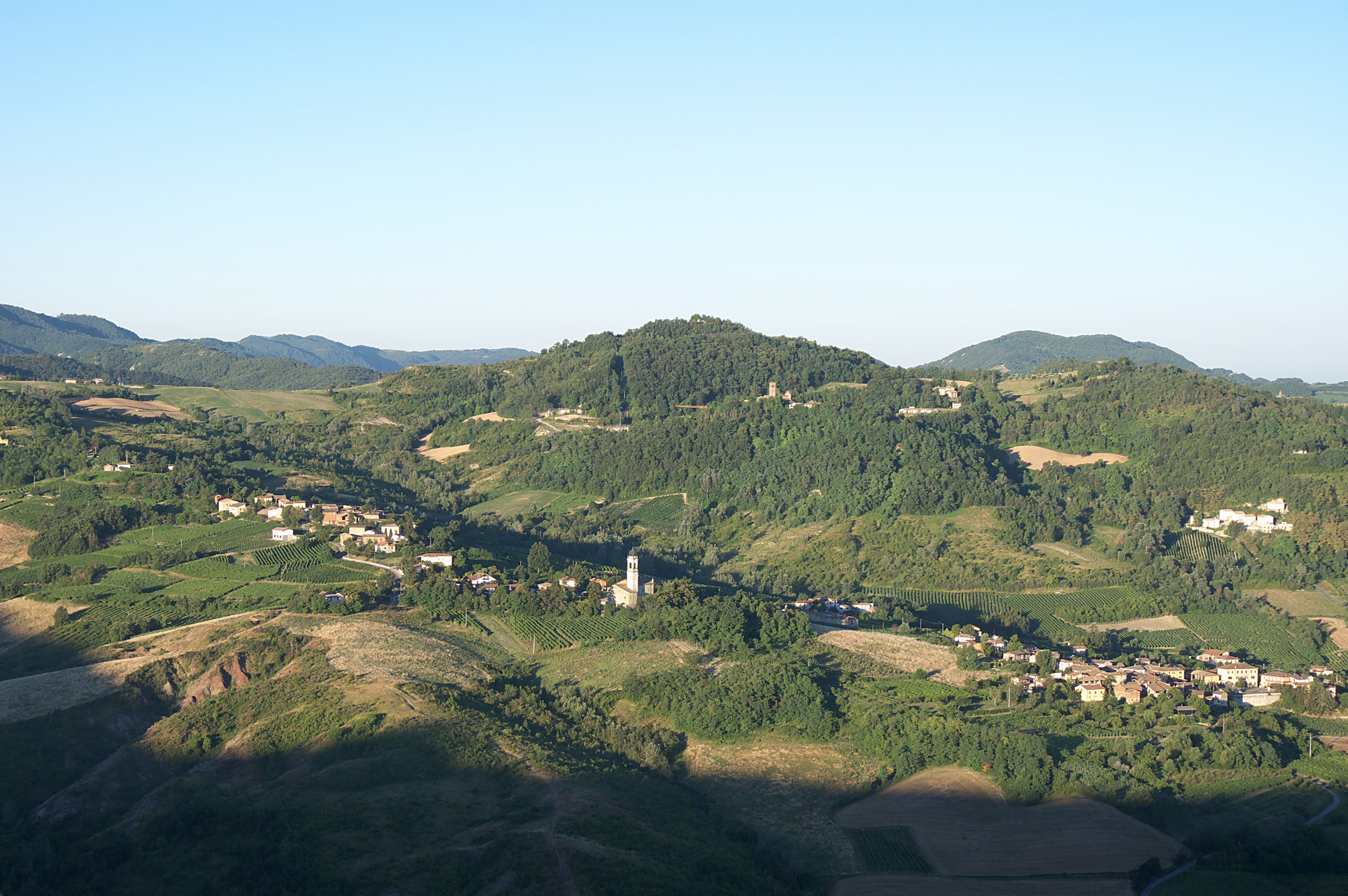

- Location within Italy Location within Lombardy
- Coordinates: 44°56′N 9°12′E
- Country: Italy
- Region: Lombardy
- Province: Province of Pavia (PV)

Area
  - Total: 16.0 km^{2} (6.2 sq mi)

Population (Dec. 2004)
  - Total: 415
  - Density: 25.9/km^{2} (67.2/sq mi)
- Time zone: UTC+1 (CET)
  - Summer (DST): UTC+2 (CEST)
- Postal code: 27040
- Dialing code: 0383

Borgoratto Mormorolo is a comune (municipality) in the Province of Pavia in the Italian region Lombardy, located about 60 km (37 mi) south of Milan and about 30 km (19 mi) south of Pavia. As of 31 December 2004, it had a population of 415 and an area of 16.0 km^{2} (6.2 sq mi).

Borgoratto Mormorolo borders the following municipalities: Borgo Priolo, Fortunago, Montalto Pavese, Ruino.

== Demographic evolution ==
Historical population

Year	Pop.	±%
1861	822	—
1871	864	+5.1%
1881	823	−4.7%
1901	861	+4.6%
1911	1,021	+18.6%

Year	Pop.	±%
1921	1,155	+13.1%
1931	1,081	−6.4%
1936	1,011	−6.5%
1951	980	−3.1%
1961	759	−22.6%

Year	Pop.	±%
1971	633	−16.6%
1981	544	−14.1%
1991	496	−8.8%
2001	434	−12.5%

Source: Data from ISTAT
