= Romagnese =

- Comune
- Comune di Romagnese
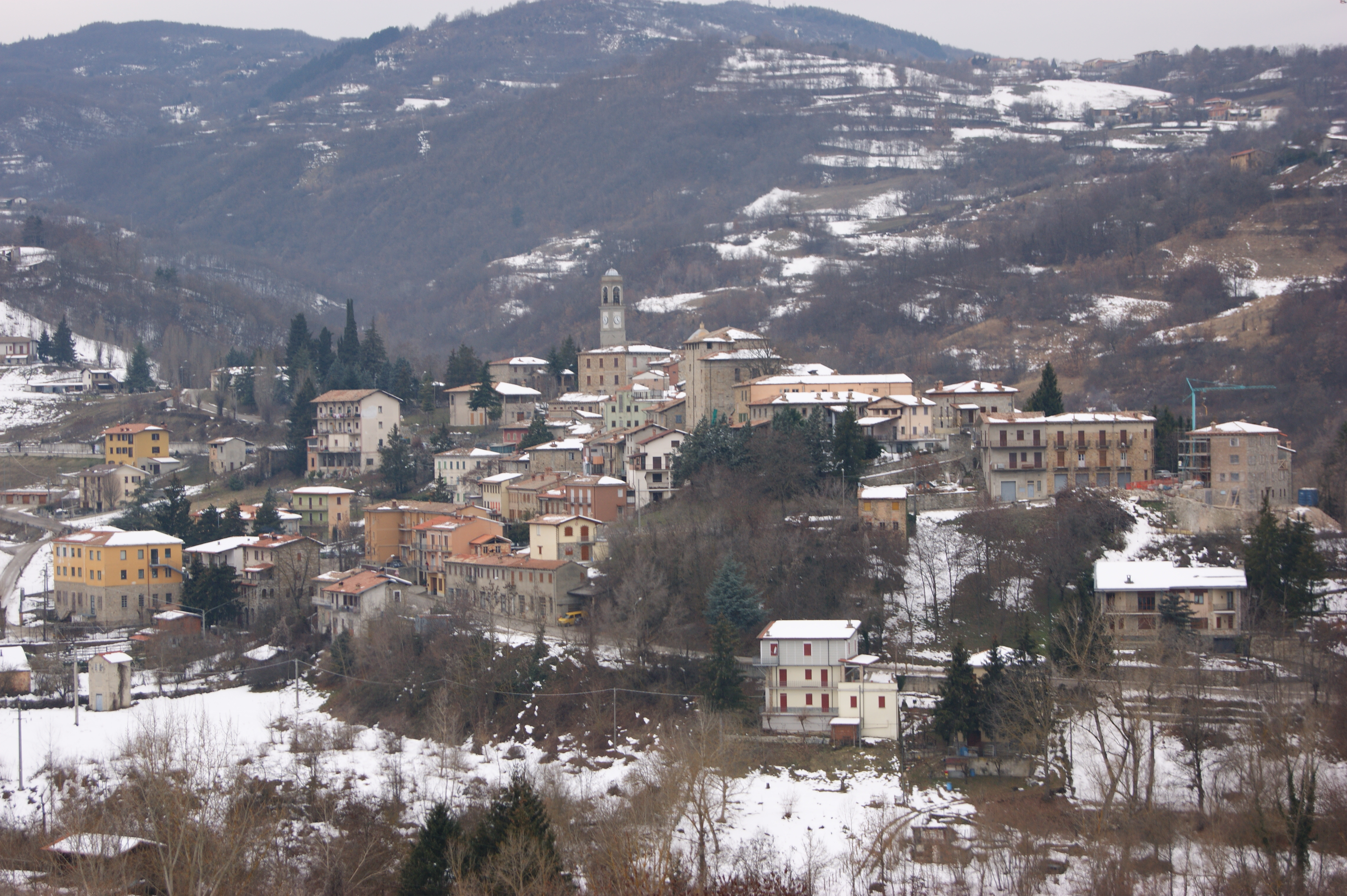

- Location within Italy Location within Lombardy
- Coordinates: 44°50′N 9°20′E
- Country: Italy
- Region: Lombardy
- Province: Pavia (PV)

Government
  - Mayor: Aurelio Bramanti

Area
  - Total: 29.72 km^{2} (11.47 sq mi)
- Elevation: 630 m (2,070 ft)

Population (31 July 2017)
  - Total: 685
  - Density: 23.0/km^{2} (59.7/sq mi)
- Demonym: Romagnoli
- Time zone: UTC+1 (CET)
  - Summer (DST): UTC+2 (CEST)
- Postal code: 27050
- Dialing code: 0383
- Website: Official website Visit Romagnese

Romagnese is a comune (municipality) in the Province of Pavia in the Italian region Lombardy, located about 70 km south of Milan and about 40 km southeast of Pavia.

Romagnese borders the following municipalities: Alta Val Tidone, Bobbio, Menconico, Varzi, Zavattarello.

== Main sights ==
- Giardino Botanico Alpino di Pietra Corva, a botanical garden
