= Val di Nizza =

- Comune
- Comune di Val di Nizza
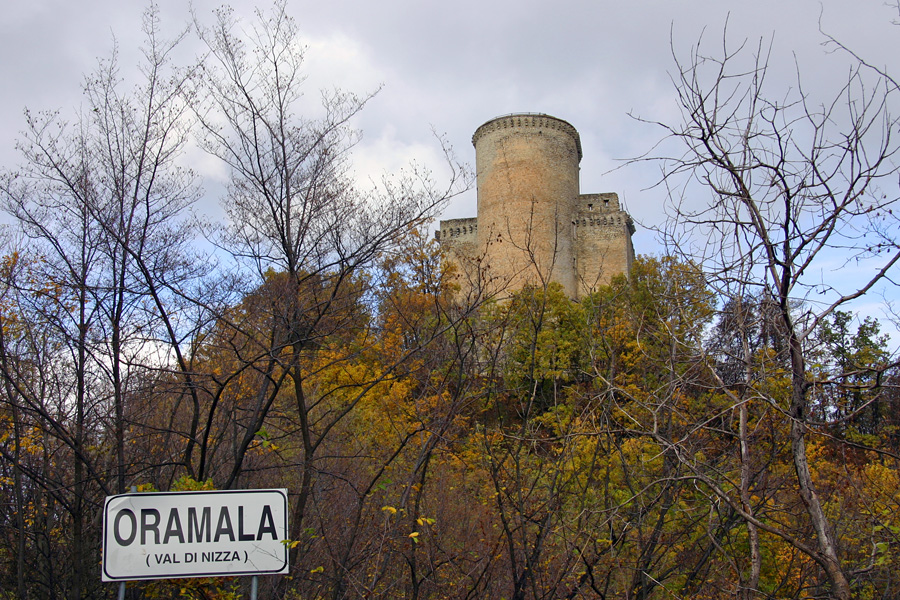

- Location within Italy Location within Lombardy
- Coordinates: 44°53′N 9°10′E
- Country: Italy
- Region: Lombardy
- Province: Province of Pavia (PV)

Area
  - Total: 29.5 km^{2} (11.4 sq mi)

Population (Dec. 2004)
  - Total: 701
  - Density: 23.8/km^{2} (61.5/sq mi)
- Time zone: UTC+1 (CET)
  - Summer (DST): UTC+2 (CEST)
- Postal code: 27050
- Dialing code: 0383
- Website: Official website

Val di Nizza is a comune (municipality) in the Province of Pavia in the Italian region Lombardy, located about 60 km (37 mi) south of Milan and about 35 km (22 mi) south of Pavia. As of 31 December 2004, it had a population of 701 and an area of 29.5 km^{2} (11.4 sq mi).

Val di Nizza borders the following municipalities: Fortunago, Montesegale, Ponte Nizza, Ruino, Valverde, Varzi.

== Demographic evolution ==
Historical population

Year	Pop.	±%
1861	1,652	—
1871	1,859	+12.5%
1881	1,809	−2.7%
1901	1,689	−6.6%
1911	1,671	−1.1%

Year	Pop.	±%
1921	1,788	+7.0%
1931	1,760	−1.6%
1936	1,786	+1.5%
1951	1,478	−17.2%
1961	1,176	−20.4%

Year	Pop.	±%
1971	921	−21.7%
1981	876	−4.9%
1991	782	−10.7%
2001	688	−12.0%

Source: Data from ISTAT
