= Cigognola =

- Comune
- Comune di Cigognola
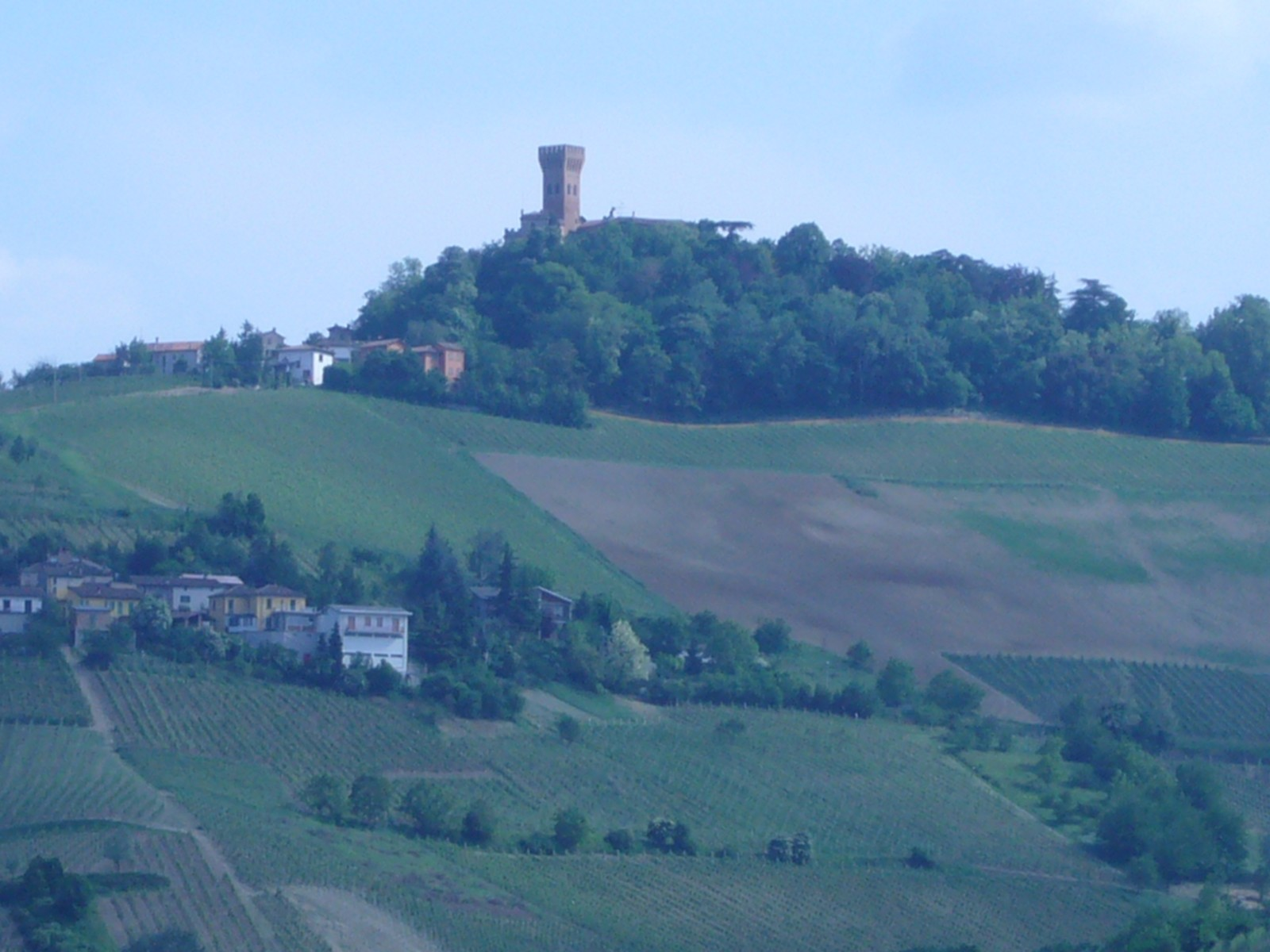
- Castle of Cigognola.

- Location within Italy Location within Lombardy
- Coordinates: 45°2′N 9°14′E
- Country: Italy
- Region: Lombardy
- Province: Pavia (PV)

Government
  - Mayor: Rossana Rovati

Area
  - Total: 8.0 km^{2} (3.1 sq mi)
- Elevation: 309 m (1,014 ft)

Population (Dec. 2004)
  - Total: 1,386
  - Density: 170/km^{2} (450/sq mi)
- Demonym: Cigognolesi
- Time zone: UTC+1 (CET)
  - Summer (DST): UTC+2 (CEST)
- Postal code: 27014
- Dialing code: 0385
- Website: Official website

Cigognola is a comune (municipality) in the Province of Pavia in the Italian region Lombardy, located about 50 km (31 mi) south of Milan and about 20 km (12 mi) southeast of Pavia.

Cigognola borders the following municipalities: Broni, Canneto Pavese, Castana, Pietra de' Giorgi.
