= Castana, Lombardy =

Administrative division in Lombardy, Italy

Castana
- Comune
- Comune di Castana
- Location within Italy Location within Lombardy
- Coordinates: 45°2′N 9°16′E
- Country: Italy
- Region: Lombardy
- Province: Province of Pavia (PV)

Area
  - Total: 5.2 km^{2} (2.0 sq mi)

Population (Dec. 2004)
  - Total: 739
  - Density: 140/km^{2} (370/sq mi)
- Time zone: UTC+1 (CET)
  - Summer (DST): UTC+2 (CEST)
- Postal code: 27040
- Dialing code: 0385

Castana is a comune (municipality) in the Province of Pavia in the Italian region Lombardy, located about 50 km (31 mi) south of Milan and about 20 km (12 mi) southeast of Pavia. As of 31 December 2004, it had a population of 739 and an area of 5.2 km^{2} (2.0 sq mi).

Castana borders the following municipalities: Canneto Pavese, Cigognola, Montescano, Montù Beccaria, Pietra de' Giorgi, Santa Maria della Versa.

== Demographic evolution ==
Historical population

| Year | Pop. | ±% |
|---|---|---|
| 1861 | 1,629 | — |
| 1871 | 1,710 | +5.0% |
| 1881 | 1,981 | +15.8% |
| 1901 | 2,219 | +12.0% |
| 1911 | 1,854 | −16.4% |

| Year | Pop. | ±% |
|---|---|---|
| 1921 | 1,641 | −11.5% |
| 1931 | 1,627 | −0.9% |
| 1936 | 1,443 | −11.3% |
| 1951 | 1,289 | −10.7% |
| 1961 | 1,185 | −8.1% |

| Year | Pop. | ±% |
|---|---|---|
| 1971 | 949 | −19.9% |
| 1981 | 811 | −14.5% |
| 1991 | 771 | −4.9% |
| 2001 | 754 | −2.2% |

Source: Data from ISTAT
