= Montalto Pavese =

- Comune
- Comune di Montalto Pavese
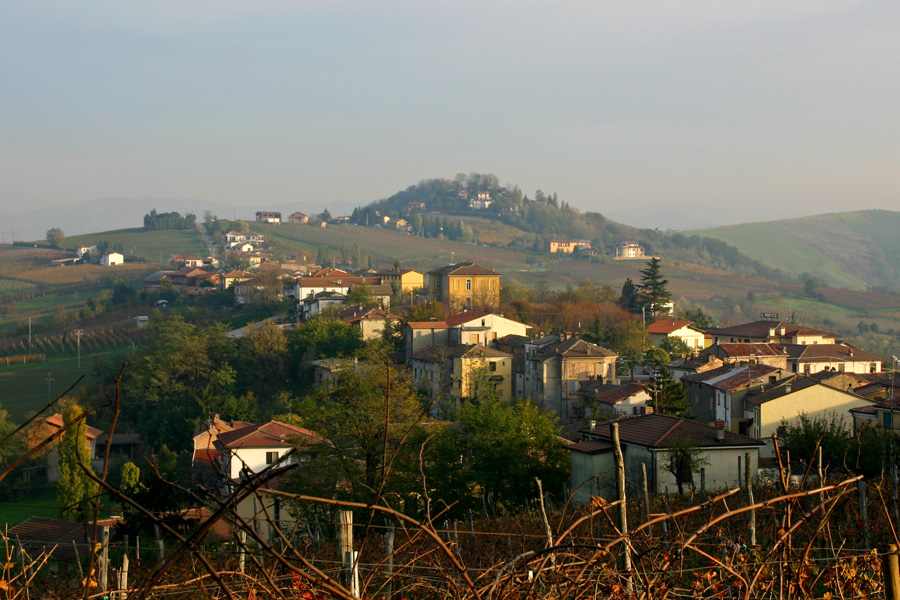

- Location within Italy Location within Lombardy
- Coordinates: 44°59′N 9°13′E
- Country: Italy
- Region: Lombardy
- Province: Province of Pavia (PV)

Area
  - Total: 19.1 km^{2} (7.4 sq mi)

Population (Jan. 2025)
  - Total: 821
  - Density: 43.0/km^{2} (111/sq mi)
- Time zone: UTC+1 (CET)
  - Summer (DST): UTC+2 (CEST)
- Postal code: 27040
- Dialing code: 0383

Montalto Pavese is a comune (municipality) in the Province of Pavia in the Italian region Lombardy, located about 50 km (31 mi) south of Milan and about 25 km (16 mi) south of Pavia. As of 1st of January 2025, it had a population of 821 and an area of 19.1 km^{2} (7.4 sq mi).

Montalto Pavese borders the following municipalities: Borgo Priolo, Borgoratto Mormorolo, Calvignano, Lirio, Montecalvo Versiggia, Mornico Losana, Oliva Gessi, Pietra de' Giorgi, Rocca de' Giorgi, and Ruino. It is the hometown of Luigi Gatti, the famous restaurateur best known as the manager of the À la Carte restaurant on the RMS Titanic, being one of the numerous victims of the sinking.

== Demographic evolution ==
Historical population

Year	Pop.	±%
1861	1,445	—
1871	1,554	+7.5%
1881	1,632	+5.0%
1901	1,523	−6.7%
1911	1,751	+15.0%

Year	Pop.	±%
1921	1,952	+11.5%
1931	2,052	+5.1%
1936	2,054	+0.1%
1951	1,939	−5.6%
1961	1,506	−22.3%

Year	Pop.	±%
1971	1,235	−18.0%
1981	1,125	−8.9%
1991	1,048	−6.8%
2001	963	−8.1%

Source: Data from ISTAT
