= Montecalvo Versiggia =

- Comune
- Comune di Montecalvo Versiggia
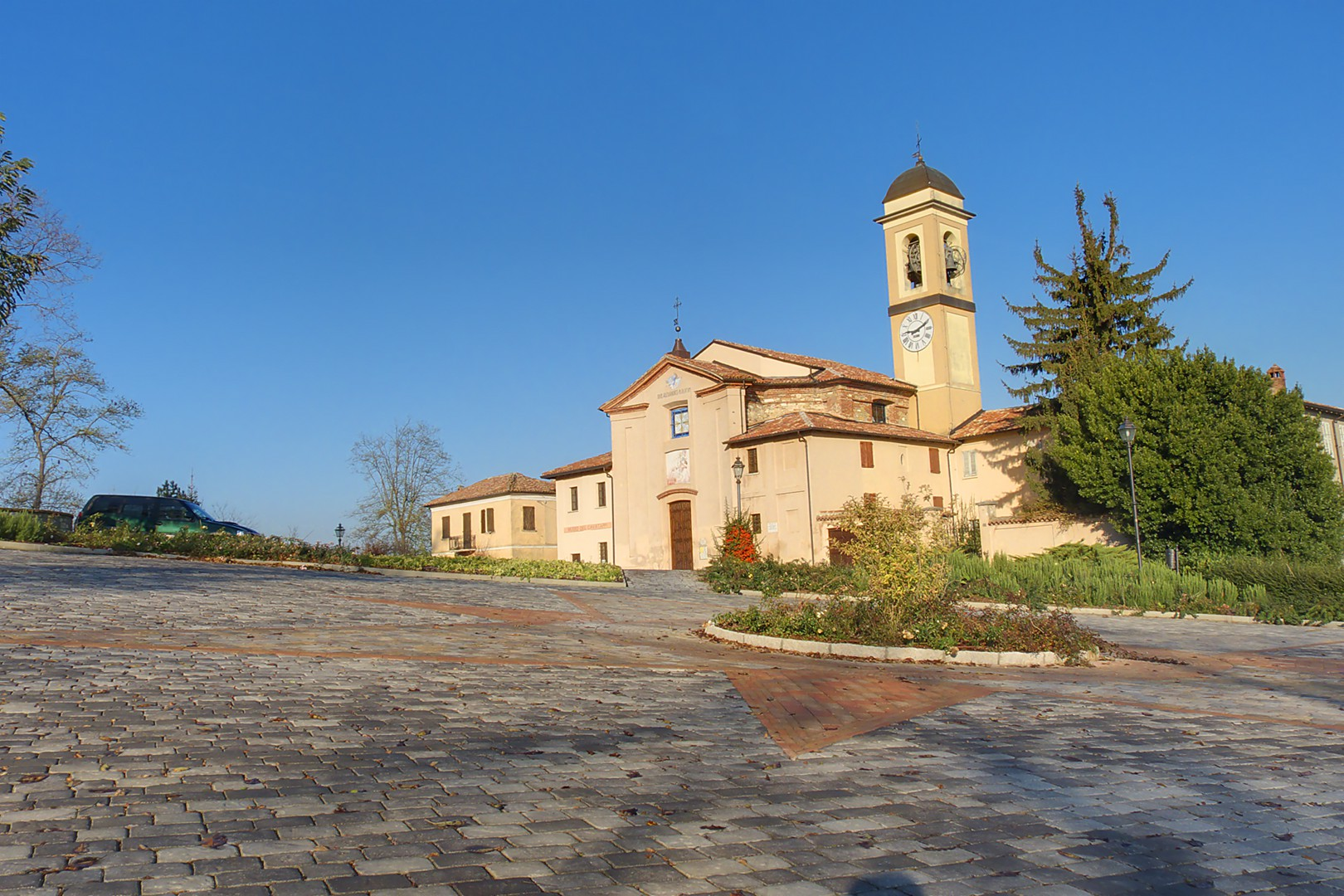

- Montecalvo within the Province of Pavia

- Location within Italy Location within Lombardy
- Coordinates: 44°58′N 9°16′E
- Country: Italy
- Region: Lombardy
- Province: Pavia (PV)
- Frazioni: Bagarello, Carolo, Casella, Castelrotto, Cerchiara, Colombato, Crocetta, Francia, Michelazza

Government
  - Mayor: Roberto Delmonte

Area
  - Total: 11.4 km^{2} (4.4 sq mi)
- Elevation: 360 m (1,180 ft)

Population (30 November 2017)
  - Total: 541
  - Density: 47.5/km^{2} (123/sq mi)
- Time zone: UTC+1 (CET)
  - Summer (DST): UTC+2 (CEST)
- Postal code: 27047
- Dialing code: 0385
- Website: Official website

Montecalvo Versiggia is a comune (municipality) in the Province of Pavia in the Italian region Lombardy, located about 60 kilometres (37 mi) south of Milan and about 25 kilometres (16 mi) southeast of Pavia.

Montecalvo Versiggia borders the following municipalities: Canevino, Golferenzo, Lirio, Montalto Pavese, Rocca de' Giorgi, Santa Maria della Versa and Volpara.
