= Montù Beccaria =

- Comune
- Comune di Montù Beccaria
- Location within Italy Location within Lombardy
- Coordinates: 45°2′N 9°19′E
- Country: Italy
- Region: Lombardy
- Province: Province of Pavia (PV)

Area
  - Total: 15.6 km^{2} (6.0 sq mi)
- Elevation: 280 m (920 ft)

Population (Dec. 2004)
  - Total: 1,736
  - Density: 111/km^{2} (288/sq mi)
- Demonym: Montuensi
- Time zone: UTC+1 (CET)
  - Summer (DST): UTC+2 (CEST)
- Postal code: 27040
- Dialing code: 0385

Montù Beccaria is a comune (municipality) in the Province of Pavia in the Italian region Lombardy, located about 50 km (31 mi) south of Milan and about 20 km (12 mi) southeast of Pavia. As of 31 December 2004, it had a population of 1,736 and an area of 15.6 km^{2} (6 sq mi).

Montù Beccaria borders the following municipalities: Bosnasco, Canneto Pavese, Castana, Montescano, Rovescala, San Damiano al Colle, Santa Maria della Versa, Stradella, Zenevredo.

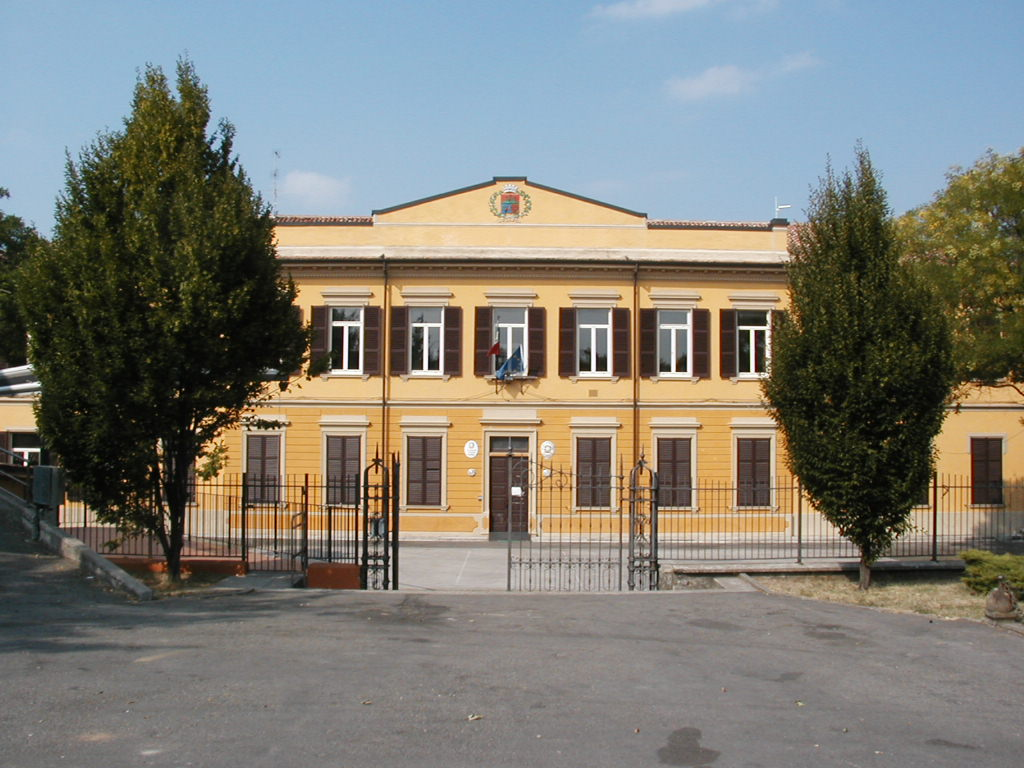
Montù Beccaria

== Demographic evolution ==
Historical population

| Year | Pop. | ±% |
|---|---|---|
| 1861 | 3,486 | — |
| 1871 | 3,979 | +14.1% |
| 1881 | 4,030 | +1.3% |
| 1901 | 4,309 | +6.9% |
| 1911 | 4,361 | +1.2% |

| Year | Pop. | ±% |
|---|---|---|
| 1921 | 4,173 | −4.3% |
| 1931 | 3,922 | −6.0% |
| 1936 | 3,727 | −5.0% |
| 1951 | 3,348 | −10.2% |
| 1961 | 2,796 | −16.5% |

| Year | Pop. | ±% |
|---|---|---|
| 1971 | 2,282 | −18.4% |
| 1981 | 1,994 | −12.6% |
| 1991 | 1,756 | −11.9% |
| 2001 | 1,683 | −4.2% |

Source: Data from ISTAT
