= Rocca de' Giorgi =

Rocca de' Giorgi Roca di Giorgi (Lombard)
- Comune
- Comune di Rocca de' Giorgi
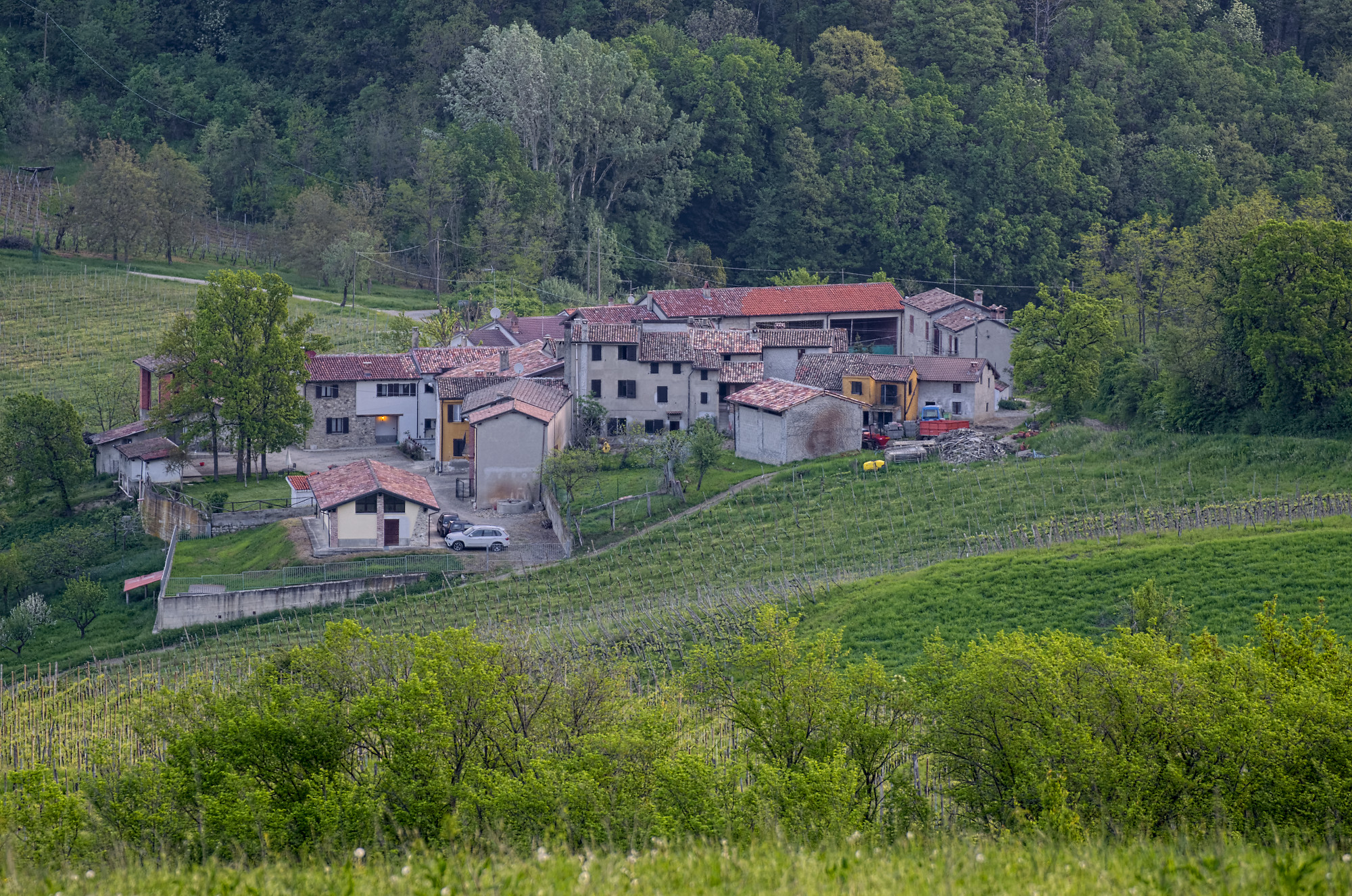
- Vallorsa

- Location within Italy Location within Lombardy
- Coordinates: 44°57′N 9°15′E
- Country: Italy
- Region: Lombardy
- Province: Pavia (PV)
- Frazioni: Cerchiara-Cuccagna, Vallorsa, Villa Fornace

Area
  - Total: 10.50 km^{2} (4.05 sq mi)

Population (2026)
  - Total: 37
  - Density: 3.5/km^{2} (9.1/sq mi)
- Time zone: UTC+1 (CET)
  - Summer (DST): UTC+2 (CEST)
- Postal code: 27043
- Dialing code: 0385

Rocca de' Giorgi (Lombard: Roca di Giorgi) is a comune (municipality) in the Province of Pavia in the region of Lombardy in Italy, located about 60 kilometres (37 mi) south of Milan and about 25 kilometres (16 mi) southeast of Pavia. It has 37 inhabitants.

Rocca de' Giorgi borders the municipalities of Canevino, Montalto Pavese, Montecalvo Versiggia, and Ruino.

== Demographics ==
As of 2026, the population is 37, of which 48.6% are male, and 51.4% are female. Minors make up 27% of the population, and seniors make up 8.1%.

Historical population

Year	Pop.	±%
1861	382	—
1871	440	+15.2%
1881	462	+5.0%
1901	447	−3.2%
1911	493	+10.3%
1921	536	+8.7%
1931	577	+7.6%
1936	585	+1.4%

Year	Pop.	±%
1951	552	−5.6%
1961	498	−9.8%
1971	297	−40.4%
1981	229	−22.9%
1991	130	−43.2%
2001	98	−24.6%
2011	79	−19.4%
2021	60	−24.1%

Source: ISTAT

=== Immigration ===
As of 2025, immigrants make up 28.9% of the population. The foreign countries of birth are Romania, Bulgaria, the Dominican Republic, Germany, and Bolivia.
