= Fortunago =

- Comune
- Comune di Fortunago
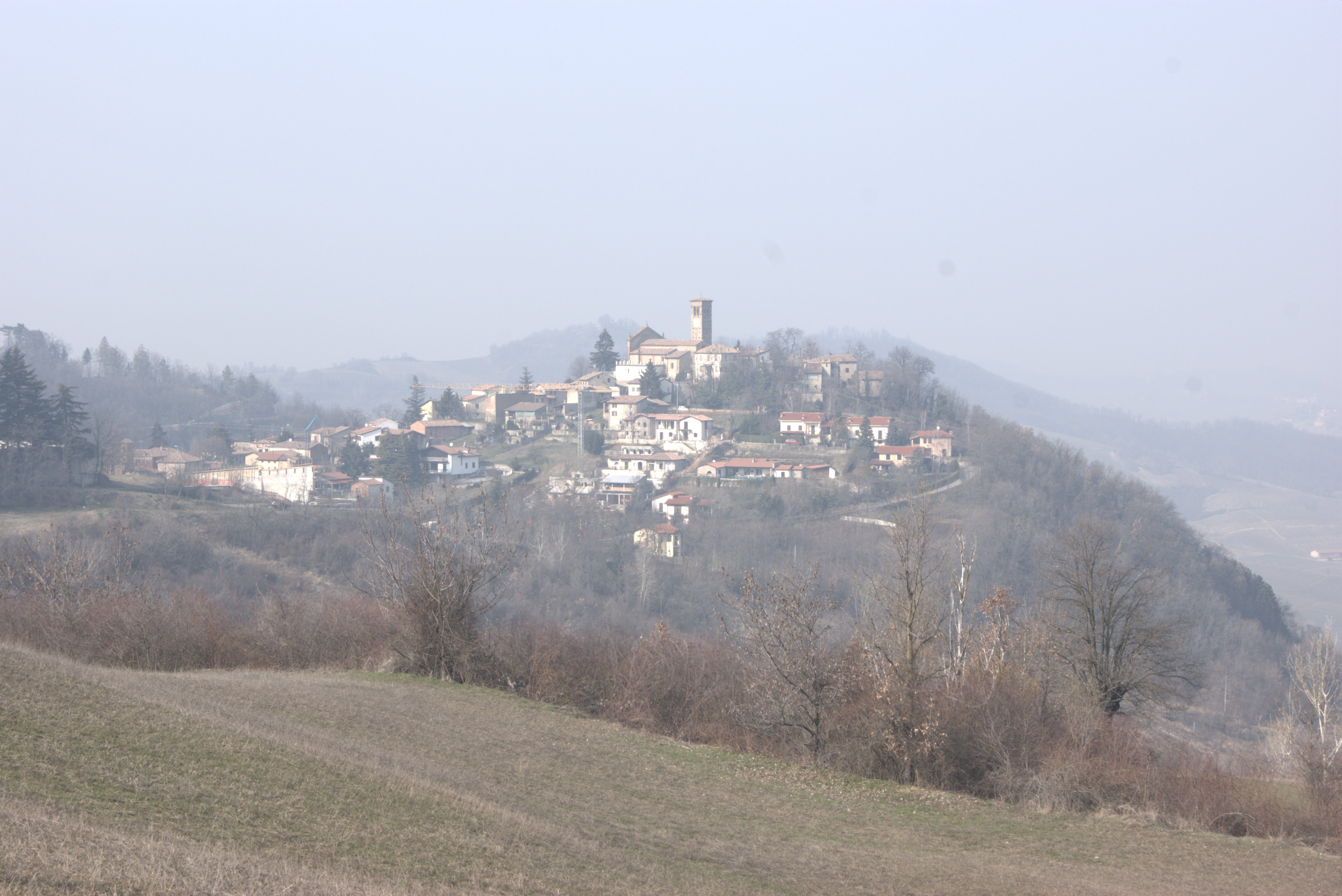

- Location within Italy Location within Lombardy
- Coordinates: 44°55′N 9°11′E
- Country: Italy
- Region: Lombardy
- Province: Province of Pavia (PV)

Government
  - Mayor: Achille Lanfranchi

Area
  - Total: 18.0 km^{2} (6.9 sq mi)

Population (April 2010)
  - Total: 380
  - Density: 21/km^{2} (55/sq mi)
- Time zone: UTC+1 (CET)
  - Summer (DST): UTC+2 (CEST)
- Postal code: 27040
- Dialing code: 0383
- Website: Official website

Fortunago is a comune (municipality) in the Province of Pavia in the Italian region Lombardy, located about 91 km (57 mi) south of Milan and about 42 km (26 mi) south of Pavia. As of 31 December 2004, it had a population of 407 and an area of 18.0 km^{2} (6.9 sq mi).

Fortunago borders the following municipalities: Borgo Priolo, Borgoratto Mormorolo, Montesegale, Ruino, Val di Nizza. It is one of I Borghi più belli d'Italia ("The most beautiful villages of Italy").

Fortunago was also the location for the film Human Capital by Italian filmmaker Paolo Virzì. Some of the scenes of the film were shot at the Villa "La Dominante", placed in Montebelletto, in the nearby of the village.

== Demographic evolution ==
Historical population

Year	Pop.	±%
1861	854	—
1871	992	+16.2%
1881	879	−11.4%
1901	897	+2.0%
1911	1,052	+17.3%

Year	Pop.	±%
1921	1,142	+8.6%
1931	1,140	−0.2%
1936	1,164	+2.1%
1951	1,047	−10.1%
1961	796	−24.0%

Year	Pop.	±%
1971	582	−26.9%
1981	522	−10.3%
1991	454	−13.0%
2001	420	−7.5%

Source: Data from ISTAT
