= Golferenzo =

- Comune
- Comune di Golferenzo
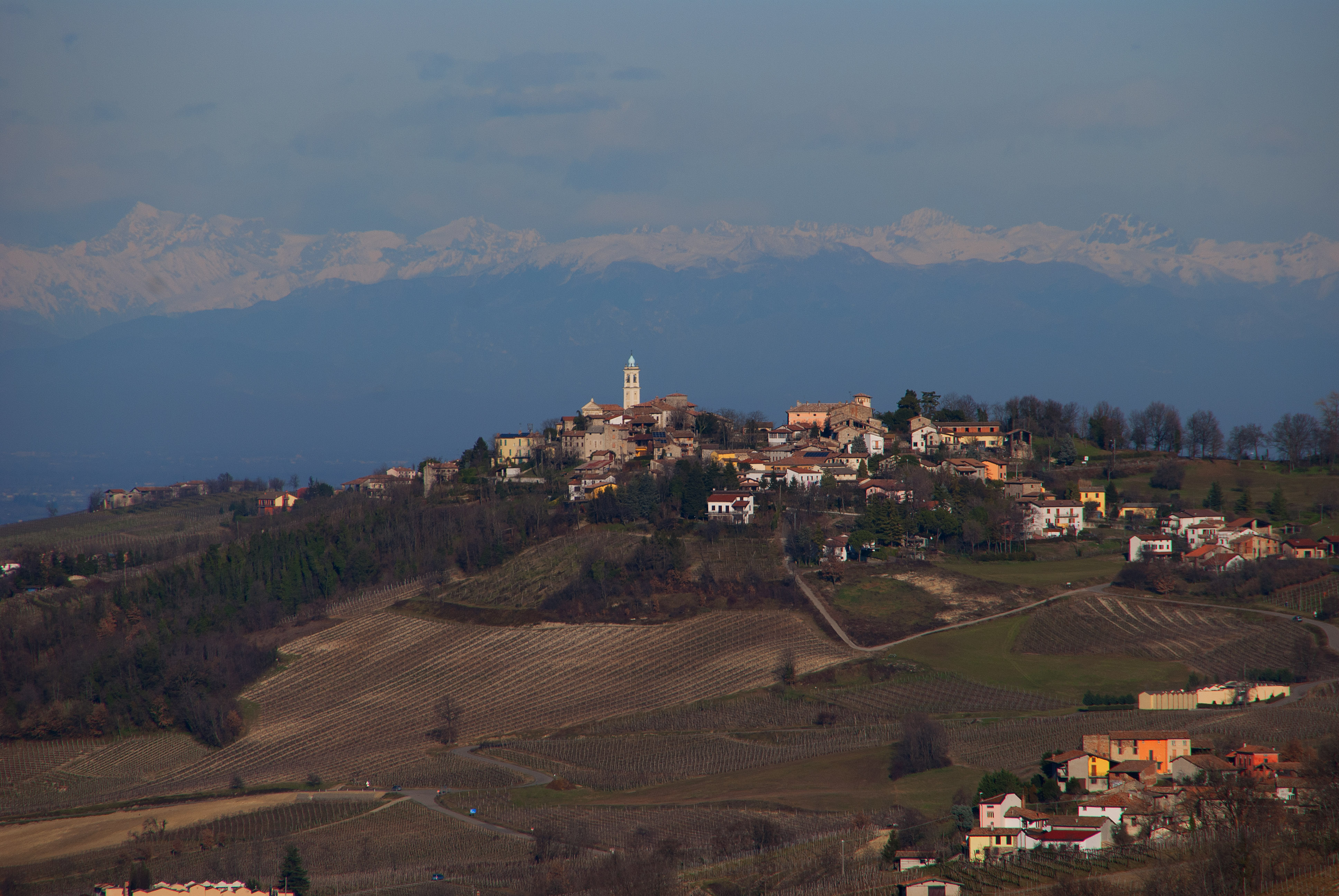

- Location within Italy Location within Lombardy
- Coordinates: 44°58′N 9°18′E
- Country: Italy
- Region: Lombardy
- Province: Pavia (PV)

Government
  - Mayor: Claudio Scabini

Area
  - Total: 4.3 km^{2} (1.7 sq mi)

Population (31 August 2017)
  - Total: 194
  - Density: 45/km^{2} (120/sq mi)
- Time zone: UTC+1 (CET)
  - Summer (DST): UTC+2 (CEST)
- Postal code: 27047
- Dialing code: 0385
- Website: Official website

Golferenzo is a comune (municipality) in the Province of Pavia in the Italian region Lombardy, located about 60 kilometres (37 mi) south of Milan and about 25 kilometres (16 mi) southeast of Pavia.

Golferenzo borders the following municipalities: Alta Val Tidone, Montecalvo Versiggia, Santa Maria della Versa, Volpara. It is one of I Borghi più belli d'Italia ("The most beautiful villages of Italy").
