= Luigi Gatti (restaurateur) =

Italian Titanic restaurateur (1875–1912)

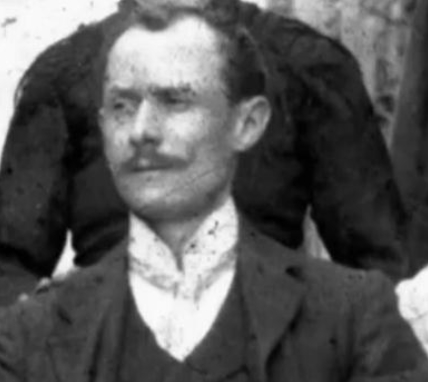
- Born: Gaspare Antonio Pietro Gatti; 3 January 1875; Montalto Pavese, Lombardy, Italy
- Died: 15 April 1912 (aged 37); North Atlantic Ocean
- Resting place: Fairview Cemetery, Halifax, Nova Scotia, Canada
- Occupation: Restaurant entrepreneur
- Spouse: Edith Kate Cheese
- Children: 1

Gaspare Antonio Pietro "Luigi" Gatti (3 January 1875 – 15 April 1912) was an Italian businessman and restaurateur, best known as the manager of the À la Carte restaurant on the RMS Titanic, catering to passengers for whom first-class service was not exclusive enough. He died on the Titanic during her ill-faited maiden voyage.

== Early life ==
Gatti was born on 3 January 1875 in Montalto Pavese, Italy. He was one of eleven children born to Paolo Gatti, a local councillor and magistrate, and Maria Nascimbene.

== Personal life ==
In 1902, at St Luke's, Hammersmith, Gatti married Edith Kate Cheese, the daughter of steward William James Cheese and his wife Emily of Chelsea. They had a son, Luigi Victor, "Vittorio" born in 1904. In 1902, they were living in Hammersmith, in 1911 in Great Titchfield Street, Marylebone, London, and in 1912 in Southampton.

== Career ==
Gatti owned and ran two restaurants in London, Gatti's Adelphi and Gatti's Strand.

== Olympic and Titanic restaurants ==
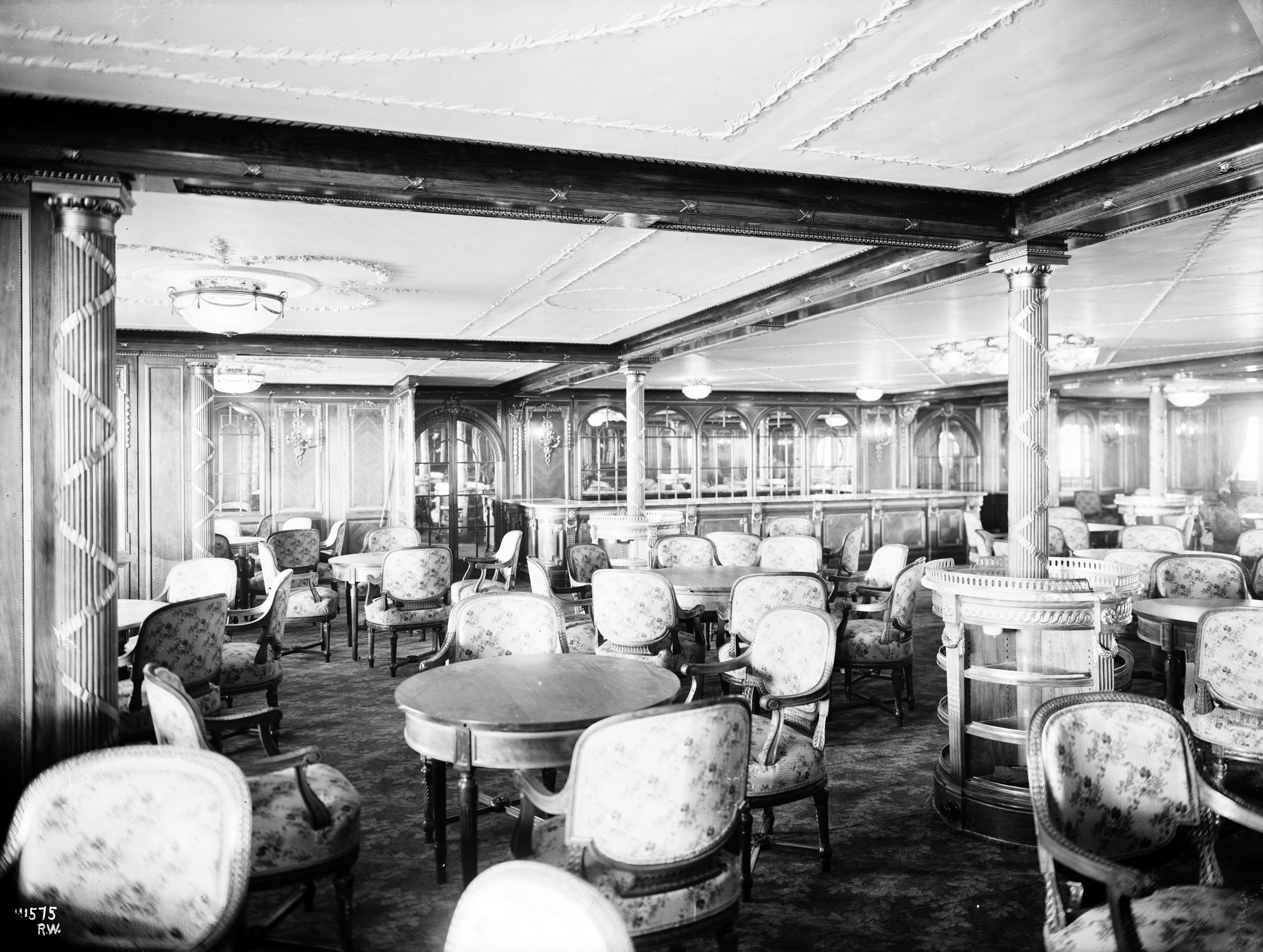
The À la Carte Restaurant, on board the RMS Olympic, very similar to her sister ship, the Titanic

Gatti was already running the À la Carte restaurant on the RMS Olympic, and because of its success, Titanic's À la Carte was even larger, able to seat over 150, with over 60 staff, mostly Italian and French, all employed directly by Gatti, who ran these restaurants as concessions. For Titanic's maiden voyage, both Gatti and his head chef on Olympic sailed to ensure the new restaurant's success.

Only first-class passengers were permitted; they had to book tables in advance and pay a supplement to the first-class fare, which included full board in the first-class dining room. Even into the 1890s, dining in public was not considered socially acceptable by some in the upper classes, especially the nobility and "old money", so it was felt necessary in effect to further divide the first class passengers. There was also a reception area for pre-dinner drinks, and a Café Parisien designed to appeal to Americans. The À la Carte restaurant used different china and silver plate from the main first-class restaurant.

== Death ==
Gatti went down with the ship on 15 April 1912. His body was recovered by the CS Minia between 26 April and 6 May 1912, and buried in Fairview Cemetery, Halifax, Nova Scotia, Canada.
