= Menconico =

- Comune
- Comune di Menconico
- Location within Italy Location within Lombardy
- Coordinates: 44°48′N 9°17′E
- Country: Italy
- Region: Lombardy
- Province: Province of Pavia (PV)

Area
  - Total: 28.2 km^{2} (10.9 sq mi)

Population (Dec. 2004)
  - Total: 465
  - Density: 16.5/km^{2} (42.7/sq mi)
- Time zone: UTC+1 (CET)
  - Summer (DST): UTC+2 (CEST)
- Postal code: 27050
- Dialing code: 0383

Menconico is a comune (municipality) in the Province of Pavia in the Italian region Lombardy, located about 70 km (43 mi) south of Milan and about 45 km (28 mi) south of Pavia. As of 31 December 2004, it had a population of 465 and an area of 28.2 km^{2} (10.9 sq mi).

Menconico borders the following municipalities: Bobbio, Romagnese, Santa Margherita di Staffora, Varzi, Zavattarello.

== Demographic evolution ==
Historical population

Year	Pop.	±%
1861	1,297	—
1871	1,260	−2.9%
1881	1,249	−0.9%
1901	1,297	+3.8%
1911	1,217	−6.2%

Year	Pop.	±%
1921	1,275	+4.8%
1931	1,295	+1.6%
1936	1,315	+1.5%
1951	1,167	−11.3%
1961	1,028	−11.9%

Year	Pop.	±%
1971	819	−20.3%
1981	700	−14.5%
1991	591	−15.6%
2001	494	−16.4%

Source: Data from ISTAT
