= Caminata =

Town in Emilia-Romagna, Italy

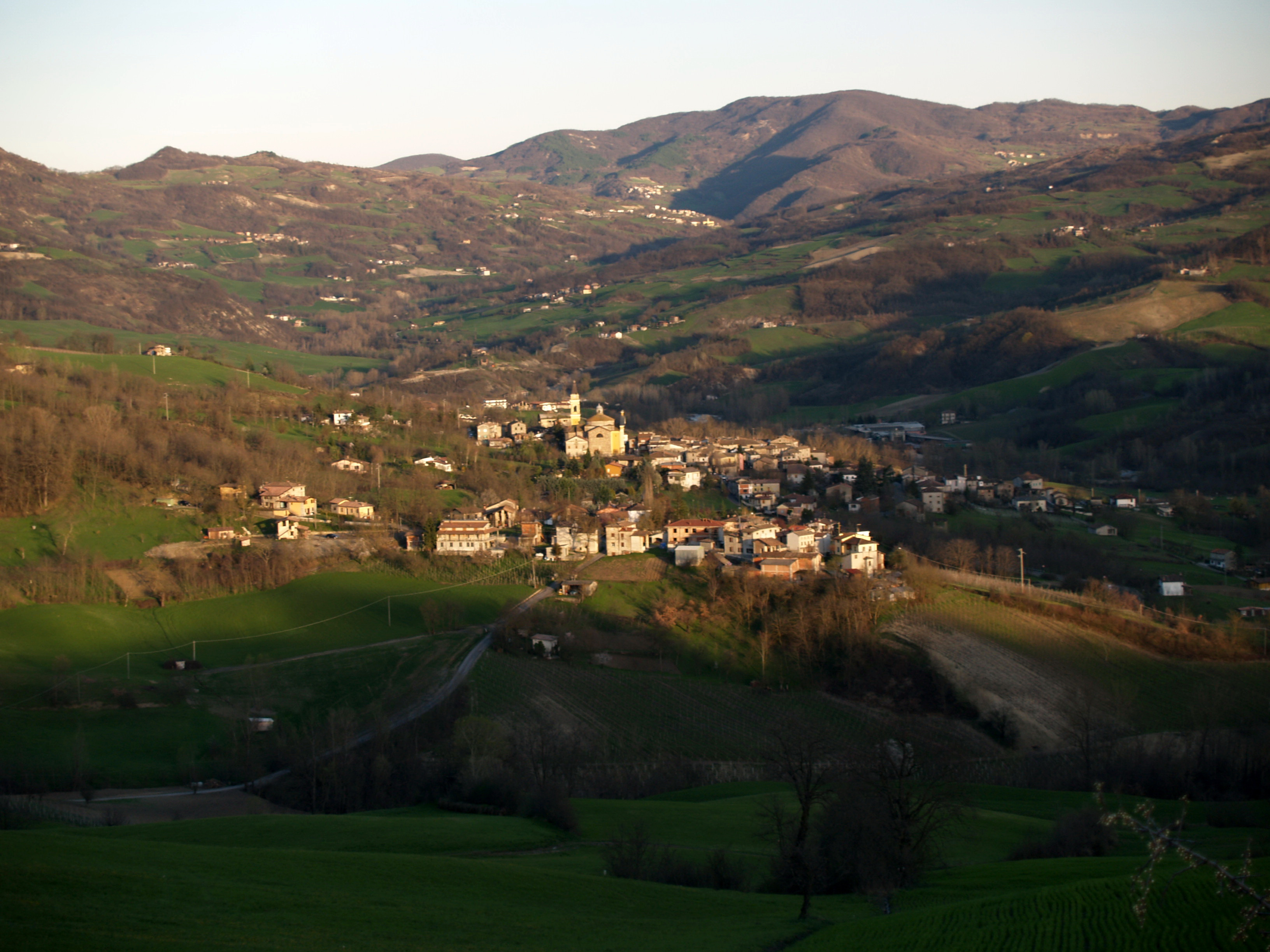
View of Caminata

Caminata is a town and former comune (municipality) in the Province of Piacenza in the Italian region Emilia-Romagna, located about 170 kilometres (110 mi) northwest of Bologna and about 35 kilometres (22 mi) southwest of Piacenza. It is now part of the comune of Alta Val Tidone.
