= Valverde, Lombardy =

Valverde
- Comune
- Comune di Valverde
- Location within Italy Location within Lombardy
- Coordinates: 44°52′N 9°14′E
- Country: Italy
- Region: Lombardy
- Province: Province of Pavia (PV)

Area
  - Total: 14.8 km^{2} (5.7 sq mi)

Population (Dec. 2004)
  - Total: 333
  - Density: 22.5/km^{2} (58.3/sq mi)
- Time zone: UTC+1 (CET)
  - Summer (DST): UTC+2 (CEST)
- Postal code: 27050
- Dialing code: 0383

Valverde is a comune (municipality) in the Province of Pavia in the Italian region of Lombardy, located about 70 km (43 mi) south of Milan and about 35 km (22 mi) south of Pavia. As of 31 December 2004, it had a population of 333 and an area of 14.8 km^{2} (5.7 sq mi).

Valverde borders the following municipalities: Ruino, Val di Nizza, Varzi, Zavattarello.

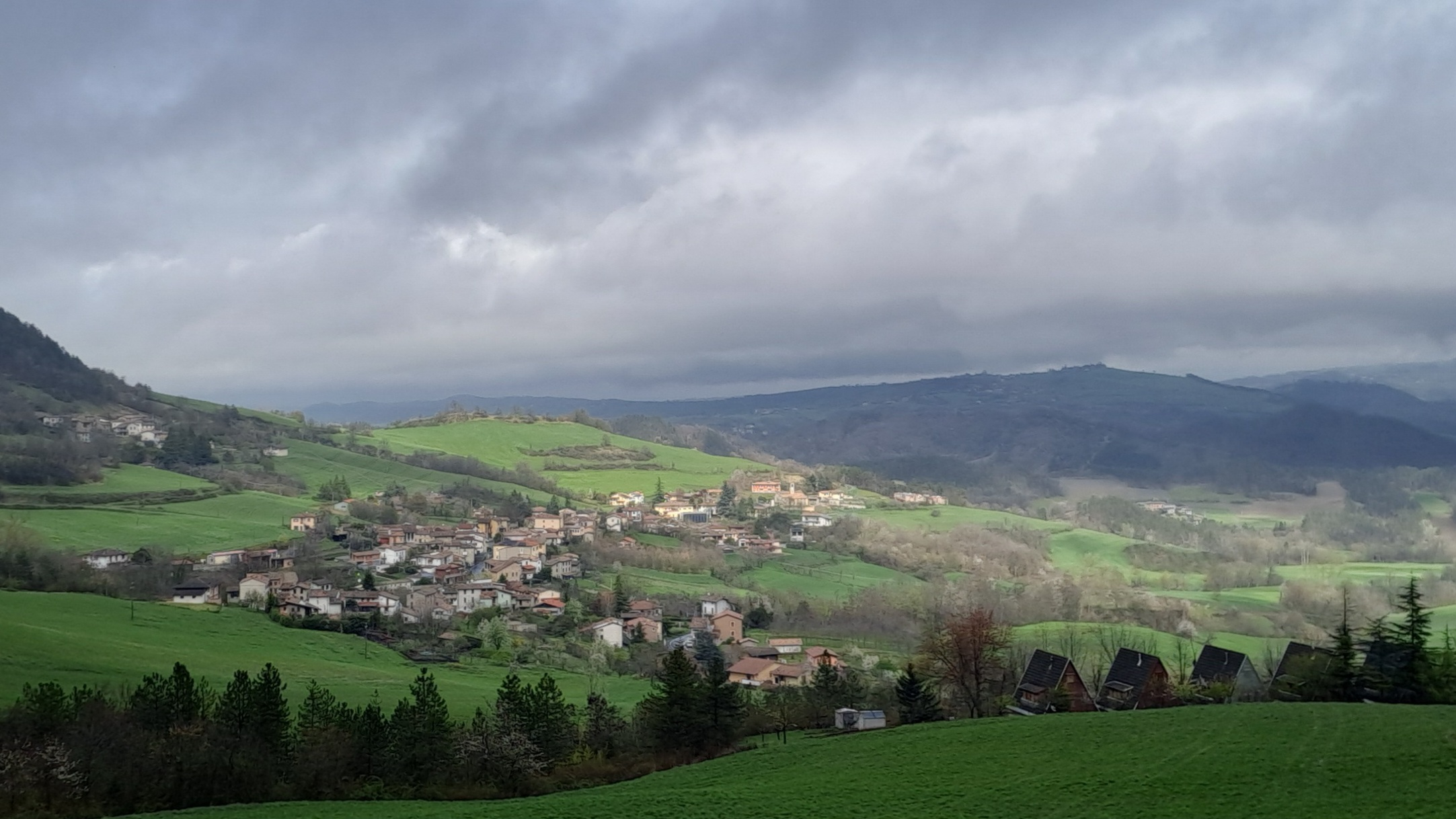

== Demographic evolution ==
Historical population

Year	Pop.	±%
1861	956	—
1871	1,013	+6.0%
1881	947	−6.5%
1901	840	−11.3%
1911	879	+4.6%

Year	Pop.	±%
1921	989	+12.5%
1931	1,020	+3.1%
1936	1,032	+1.2%
1951	845	−18.1%
1961	645	−23.7%

Year	Pop.	±%
1971	538	−16.6%
1981	466	−13.4%
1991	399	−14.4%
2001	341	−14.5%

Source: Data from ISTAT
