= Montesegale =

- Comune
- Comune di Montesegale
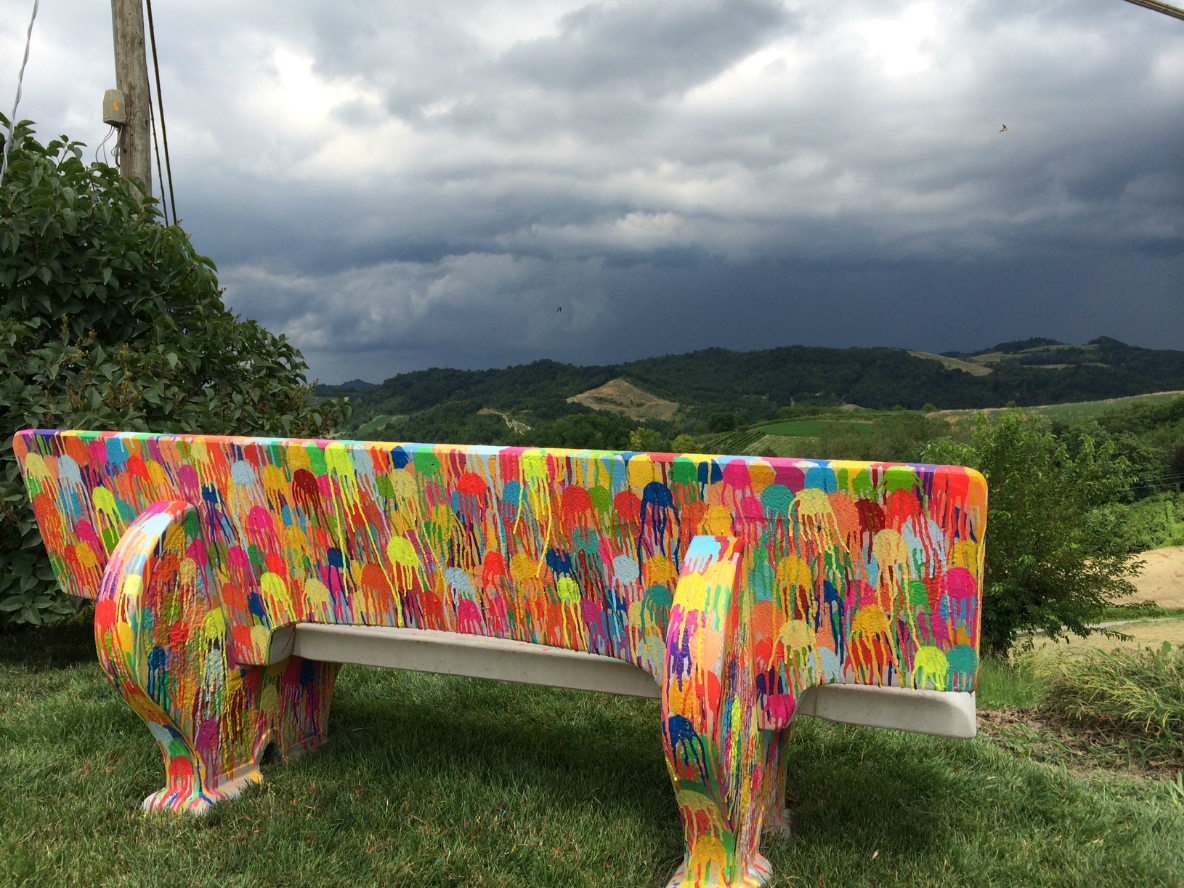
- Il Dolce far Nulla by the artist Omar Hassan

- Location within Italy Location within Lombardy
- Coordinates: 44°54′25″N 9°7′35″E
- Country: Italy
- Region: Lombardy
- Province: Pavia (PV)

Government
  - Mayor: Carlo Ferrari

Area
  - Total: 14.8 km^{2} (5.7 sq mi)
- Elevation: 326 m (1,070 ft)

Population (30 November 2017)
  - Total: 285
  - Density: 19.3/km^{2} (49.9/sq mi)
- Demonym: Montesegalesi
- Time zone: UTC+1 (CET)
  - Summer (DST): UTC+2 (CEST)
- Postal code: 27052
- Dialing code: 0383

Montesegale is a comune (municipality) in the Province of Pavia in the Italian region Lombardy, located about 60 km (37 mi) south of Milan and about 30 km (19 mi) south of Pavia.

Montesegale borders the following municipalities: Borgo Priolo, Fortunago, Godiasco, Ponte Nizza, Rocca Susella, Val di Nizza.

== Demographic evolution ==
Historical population

Year	Pop.	±%
1861	787	—
1871	880	+11.8%
1881	818	−7.0%
1901	849	+3.8%
1911	918	+8.1%

Year	Pop.	±%
1921	944	+2.8%
1931	907	−3.9%
1936	903	−0.4%
1951	803	−11.1%
1961	620	−22.8%

Year	Pop.	±%
1971	489	−21.1%
1981	411	−16.0%
1991	365	−11.2%
2001	319	−12.6%

Source: Data from ISTAT

== Twin towns ==
Montesegale is twinned with:

- Valbelle, France, since 1999
