= Canevino =

- Comune
- Comune di Canevino
- Location within Italy Location within Lombardy
- Coordinates: 44°56′N 9°17′E
- Country: Italy
- Region: Lombardy
- Province: Pavia (PV)
- Frazioni: aseo (municipal seat), Colombara, Fontana

Government
  - Mayor: Luigi Chiesa

Area
  - Total: 4.81 km^{2} (1.86 sq mi)
- Elevation: 511 m (1,677 ft)

Population (31 December 2017)
  - Total: 108
  - Density: 22.5/km^{2} (58.2/sq mi)
- Demonym: Canevinesi
- Time zone: UTC+1 (CET)
  - Summer (DST): UTC+2 (CEST)
- Postal code: 27040
- Dialing code: 0385
- Website: Official website

Canevino is a comune (municipality) in the Province of Pavia in the Italian region Lombardy, located about 60 kilometres (37 mi) south of Milan and about 30 kilometres (19 mi) southeast of Pavia.

Canevino borders the following municipalities: Alta Val Tidone, Montecalvo Versiggia, Rocca de' Giorgi, Ruino, Volpara.
