= Pecorara =

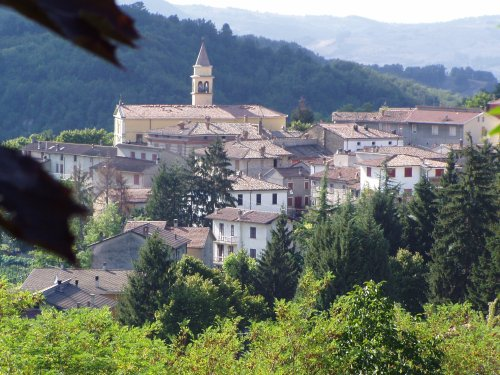
Pecorara

Pecorara is a town and former comune (municipality) in the Province of Piacenza in the Italian region Emilia-Romagna, located about 160 kilometres (99 mi) northwest of Bologna and about 30 kilometres (19 mi) southwest of Piacenza. Since 2018, it has been a frazione of the comune of Alta Val Tidone.

Since 1952, Pecorara has had an alpine festival annually.
