= Ruino =

- Comune
- Comune di Ruino
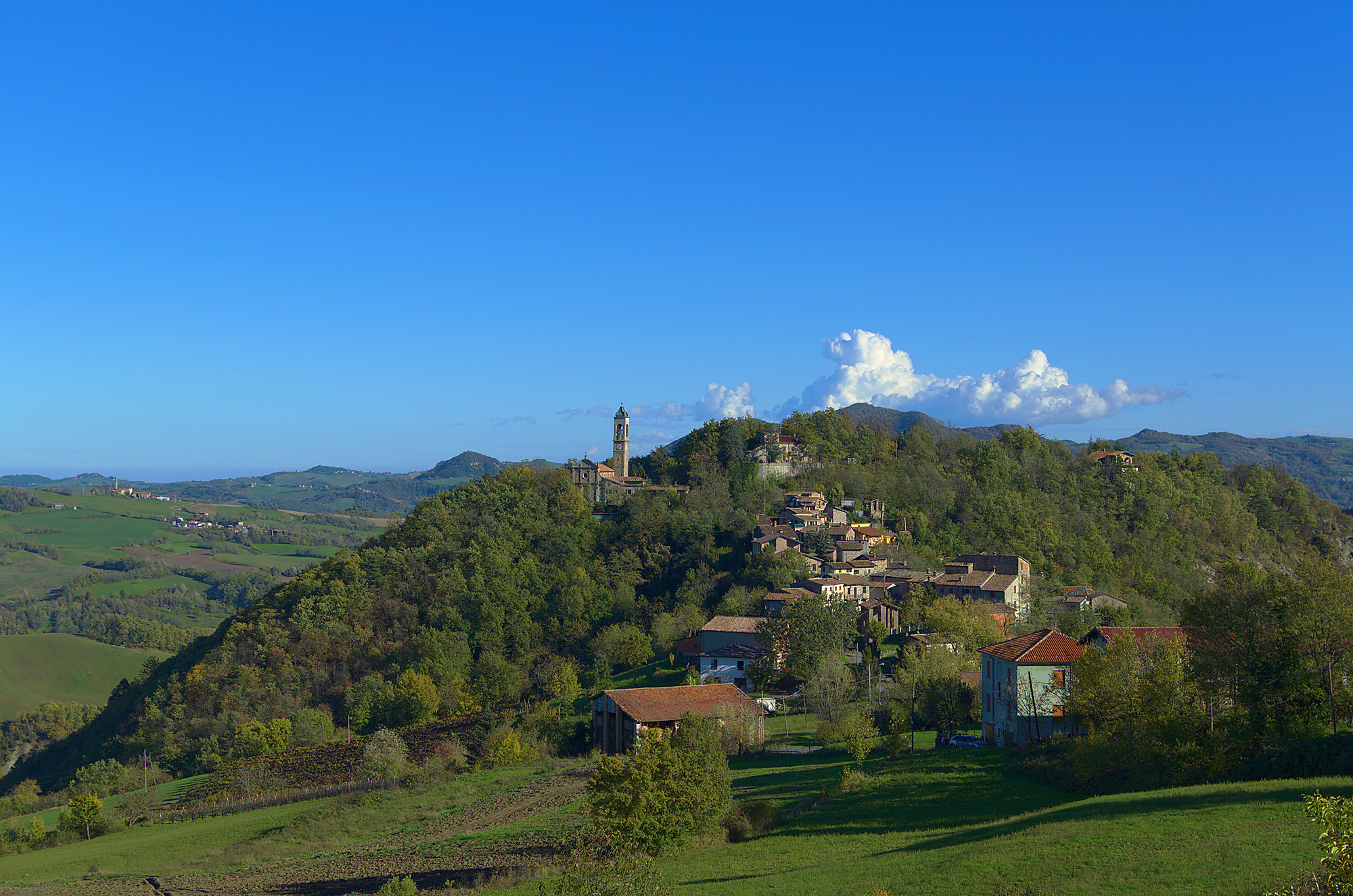

- Location within Italy Location within Lombardy
- Coordinates: 44°55′N 9°17′E
- Country: Italy
- Region: Lombardy
- Province: Pavia (PV)
- Frazioni: Ca del Matto, Ca del Zerbo, Canavera, Carmine Passo, Carmine Bivio, Costa Trentini, Montelungo, Montù Berchielli, Pometo (municipal seat), Torre degli Alberi

Government
  - Mayor: Sergio Lodigiani

Area
  - Total: 21.46 km^{2} (8.29 sq mi)
- Elevation: 541 m (1,775 ft)

Population (31 December 2010)
  - Total: 755
  - Density: 35.2/km^{2} (91.1/sq mi)
- Demonym: Ruinesi
- Time zone: UTC+1 (CET)
  - Summer (DST): UTC+2 (CEST)
- Postal code: 27040
- Dialing code: 0385
- Website: Official website

Ruino is a comune (municipality) in the Province of Pavia in the Italian region Lombardy, located about 60 km (37 mi) south of Milan and about 30 km (19 mi) southeast of Pavia.

The center of the municipality is the village of Pometo. Pometo, whose population numbers 200, is known for bread production.

Ruino borders the following municipalities: Alta Val Tidone, Borgoratto Mormorolo, Canevino, Fortunago, Montalto Pavese, Rocca de' Giorgi, Val di Nizza, Valverde, Zavattarello.
