= Staffora =

Tributary of the Po River in Pavia Province, Italy

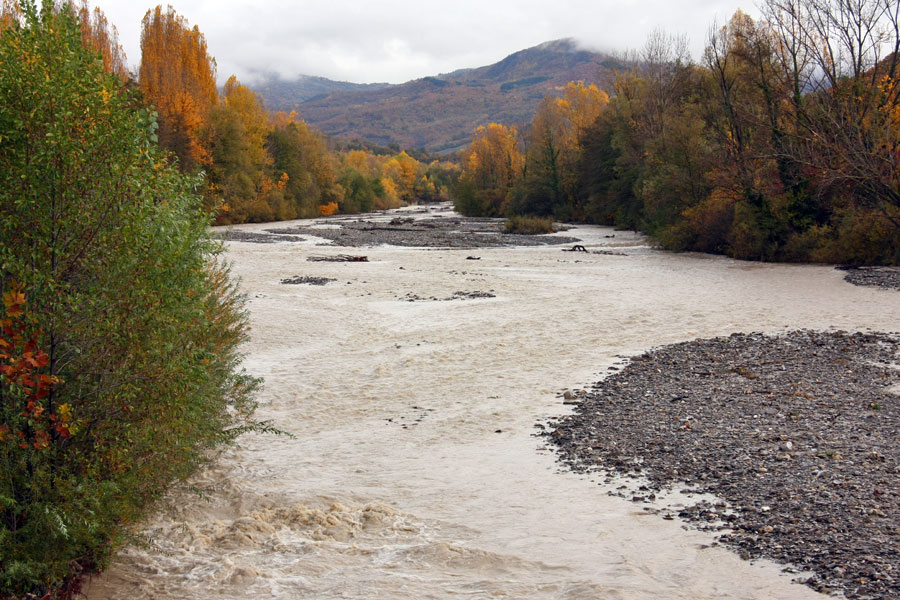

Location
- Country: Italy

Physical characteristics
- Source
  - location: Ligurian Apennines, Passo del Giovà
  - elevation: 1,343 m (4,406 ft)
- Mouth
  - location: Po, west of Cervesina
  - coordinates: 45.0824°N 9.0294°E
- Length: 58 km (36 mi)
- Basin size: 337.5 km^{2} (130.3 sq mi)
- Discharge
  - average: Varies from 0.7 to 675 cubic metres per second (25 to 23,837 cu ft/s)

Basin features
- Progression: Po→ Adriatic Sea

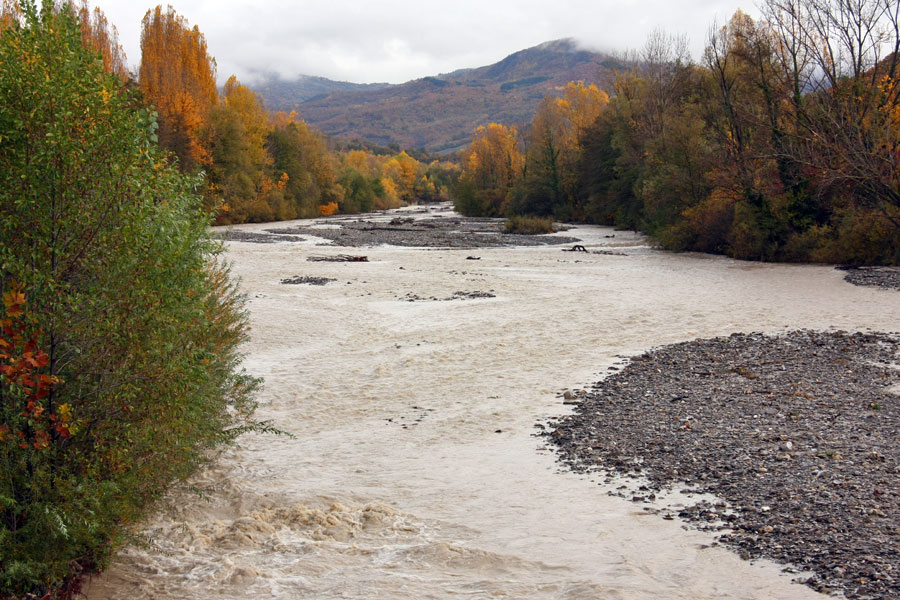

The Staffora is a river of the Oltrepò Pavese in the Province of Pavia, north-west Italy and a right-side tributary of the Po. It is probably the river known to the Romans as the Iria.

== Course ==
The river rises in the Ligurian Apennines at the Fontana di S. Giacomo, elevation 1,343 metres (4,406 ft), near the Passo del Giovà, which lies just to the east of the peak of Monte Chiappo in the commune of Santa Margherita di Staffora. It flows at first through a deep and narrow valley, receiving from the right the waters of the torrents Montagnola and Aronchio before reaching Varzi where the valley begins to widen. The torrent Crenna enters from the right and the Lella from the left before the Staffora receives its major affluents: from the right: the torrent Nizza at Ponte Nizza and the torrent Ardivestra at Godiasco and from the left the torrent Semola near Ponte Nizza. The river flows through Salice Terme (administratively a frazione of Godiasco) before entering the Pianura Padana at Rivanazzano Terme. The Staffora then passes through the eastern outskirts of Voghera, the principal town on its course, before entering the Po near Cervesina.

== Regime ==
Although the river flows throughout the year, fed by perennial springs as well as by seasonal rains and melting ice, the regime is torrential: its discharge can vary between 0.7 and 675 cubic metres per second (25 and 23,837 cu ft/s)

== History ==
The river is usually identified with the Roman Iria, following the derivation of ‘Voghera’, which lies on the left bank of the Staffora, from Vicus Iria. Some, however, have identified the Iria with the Scrivia.

The Roman Emperor Majorian was beheaded on the 7th of August 461 AD, after 5 days of torture by his Magister Militum Ricimer, near the river.

The word ‘Stàffora’, once ‘Stàfula’, comes from the Lombard "Staffel", which first referred to a place on the river's course near Voghera: cascina Stàffela.
