= San Sebastiano Curone =

- Comune
- Comune di San Sebastiano Curone
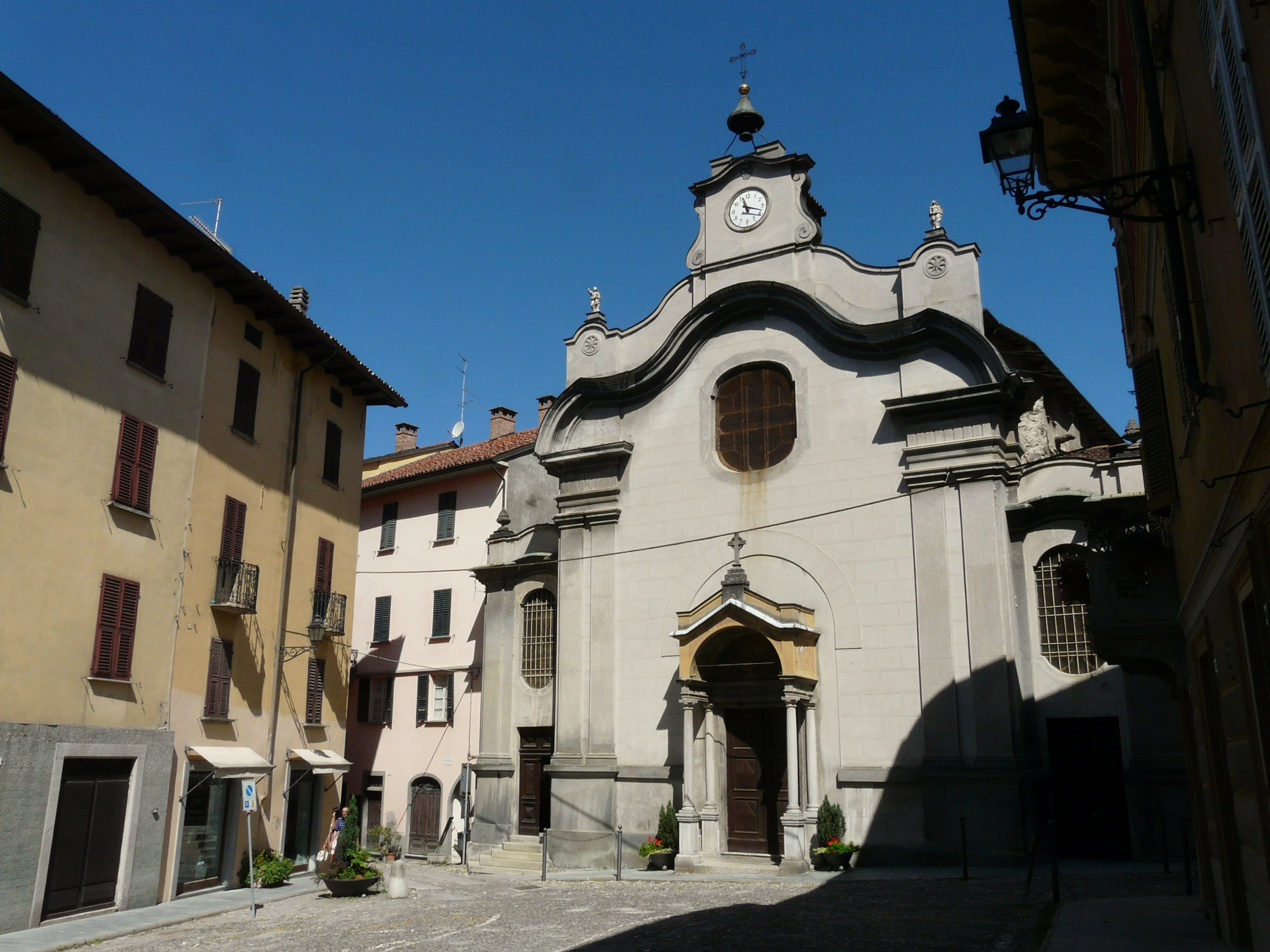
- Church of San Sebastiano.

- Location within Italy Location within Piedmont
- Coordinates: 44°47′N 9°4′E
- Country: Italy
- Region: Piedmont
- Province: Alessandria (AL)
- Frazioni: Marguata, Sant'Antonio, Telecco

Government
  - Mayor: Vincenzo Caprile

Area
  - Total: 3.89 km^{2} (1.50 sq mi)
- Elevation: 342 m (1,122 ft)

Population (30 November 2017)
  - Total: 571
  - Density: 147/km^{2} (380/sq mi)
- Demonym: Sansebastianesi
- Time zone: UTC+1 (CET)
  - Summer (DST): UTC+2 (CEST)
- Postal code: 15056
- Dialing code: 0131
- Patron saint: St. Sebastian
- Saint day: January 20
- Website: Official website

San Sebastiano Curone (Piedmontese: San Bastiau Curou ) is a comune (municipality) in the Province of Alessandria in the Italian region Piedmont, located about 110 kilometres (68 mi) southeast of Turin and about 40 kilometres (25 mi) southeast of Alessandria, at the confluence of the Curone and Museglia streams.

San Sebastiano Curone borders the municipalities of Brignano-Frascata, Dernice, Gremiasco, and Montacuto.

== History ==
Part of the commune of Fabbrica Curone it was under the dominations of the Malaspina and Fieschi from Genoa. In the 16th century, under the Doria, it became an important market centre for salt, fish and cereals.

It is the birthplace of Felice Giani, a neo-classicist painter.

William Elford Leach FRS (1790–1836), zoologist and marine biologist, died in San Sebastiano Curone.
