= Fieschi Letter =

1337 letter to Edward III of England

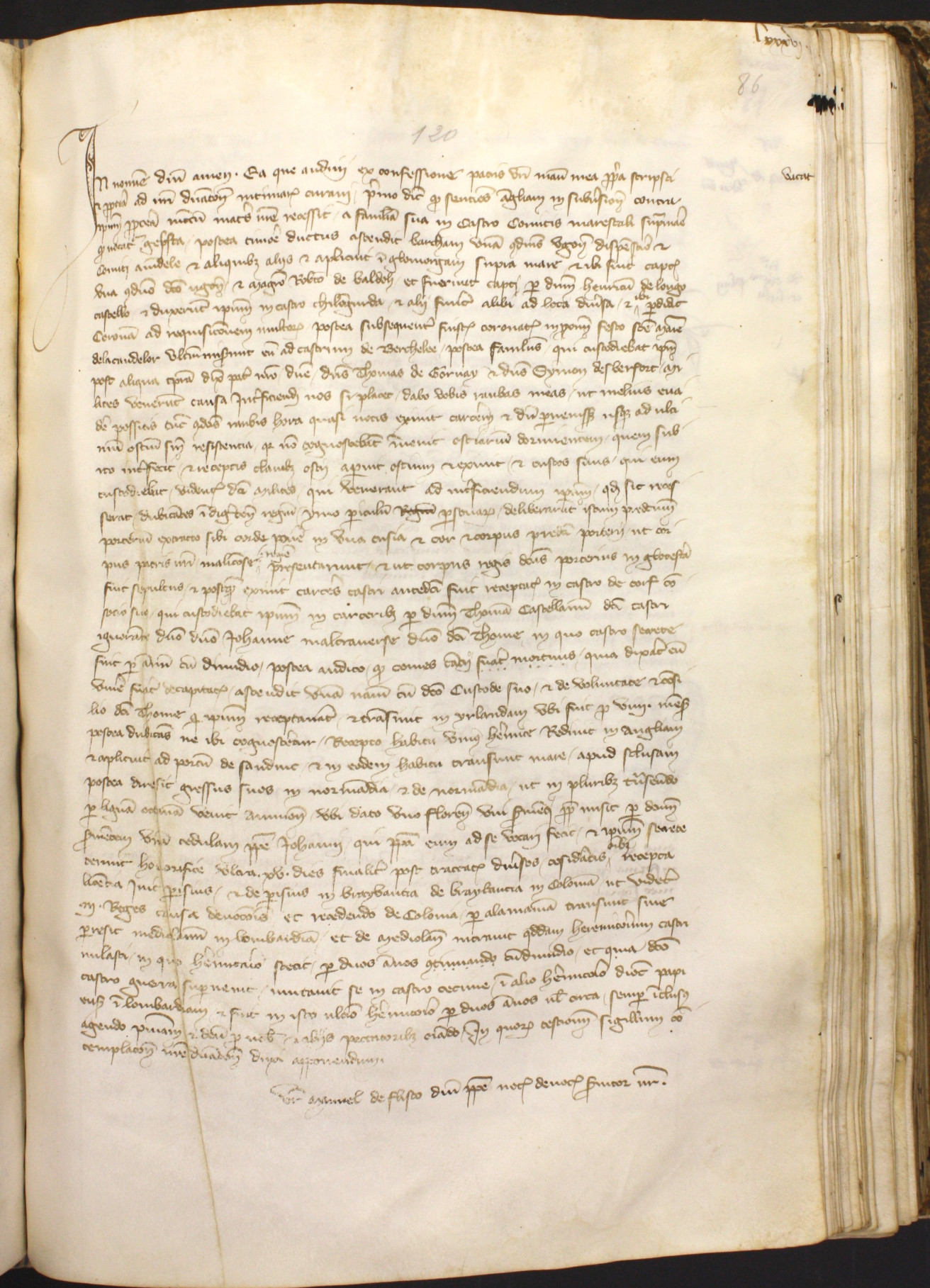
Image of the letter

The Fieschi Letter was written to the English king Edward III in circa 1337 by a Genoese priest at Avignon, Manuele Fieschi (d. 1349). He was a papal notary and a member of the influential Fieschi family, who later became bishop of Vercelli. The letter is best known for its claim that Edward II was not murdered in 1327 but escaped and spent the remainder of his life in exile in Europe. It has been a source of controversy ever since a copy was discovered in 1878 in Montpellier.

== Contents of the letter ==
The Fieschi letter begins by following the historically accepted story that Edward II fled to South Wales after the invasion of England by Isabella of France and Roger Mortimer before being arrested and imprisoned at Kenilworth Castle and Berkeley Castle in 1326. But according to Fieschi, when the king heard that he was to be killed at Berkeley Castle he changed clothes with a servant. Using this disguise he reached the gate and escaped by killing the gatekeeper. He then went to Corfe Castle, where he remained for 18 months.

Edward is then said to have stayed in Ireland for nine months. He then crossed to the Low Countries and travelled to Italy, visiting the pope in Avignon on his way through France. Edward reported to have lived the rest of his life in monastic hermitages near Cecima in the Diocese of Pavia, most likely in Sant'Alberto di Butrio abbey, Ponte Nizza.

== Provenance ==
The letter was discovered by a French archivist in an official register dated before 1368 which had been the property of Gaucelm de Deaux, bishop of Maguelonne, and was preserved in the Archives Departmentales d'Herault at Montpelier. It is still there today. The letter has been tested and is not a later forgery. Fieschi is a well known historical figure. He had several livings in England and knew the country though the letter shows a confusion between the rank of a knight and that of a lord.

== Theories in support ==
No one doubts the authenticity of Fieschi's letter, only its veracity, and it contains details that few people knew at the time and was written long before the accepted accounts of the flight, imprisonment and murder.

Ian Mortimer has argued that it is "almost certain" that Edward II did not die in 1327. It is possible that Edward II knew he had no support at home and never tried to regain the throne, especially after his son, Edward III, had removed Roger Mortimer. In the Italian town of Cecima (75 km from Milan), there is a tradition that a king of England was buried there and there is an empty medieval tomb said to be the place of his burial before his body was repatriated to England by his son.

The elaborate funeral in Gloucester of the person supposed to be Edward II may have been that of the gatekeeper. Many local dignitaries were invited to view the body from a distance, but it had been embalmed and may have been unrecognisable. For the first time a carved wooden effigy of the dead king was carried through the streets rather than the body on a bier.

Diplomatic documents also show in 1338 that Edward III travelled to Koblenz to be installed as vicar of the Holy Roman Empire and there he met someone called William le Galeys, or William the Welshman, who claimed to be the king's father. (Edward II was born in Caernarvon and was the first son of an English king to be given the title Prince of Wales.) Claiming to be the king's father would have been dangerous, and it is not known what happened to William. Some historians claim that the person was a man named William Ockle.

== Arguments against ==
Opponents who challenge the veracity of the contents of the letter argue that the letter should be seen rather as an attempt by the bishop of Maguelone (who had been sent to Germany to disrupt an Anglo-German alliance) to blackmail Edward III by undermining his position at the German court. Fieschi held various church appointments in England from 1319 and may also have been attempting to gain royal patronage. In a lengthy response to Mortimer's assertions, historian David Carpenter has argued that the letter "should not be taken as evidence of Edward II’s survival". He also states that "Adam Murimuth, in his chronicle of the time, says that many abbots, priors, knights and burgesses of Bristol and Gloucester were called to see the body [of Edward II]] and viewed it ‘superficially’, but this probably means that they couldn’t examine how the king died, not that they couldn’t see his face. It is hard to imagine a quicker way of adding to the rumours that the king was alive than for large numbers of people to see a corpse with the face covered up."

== Popular culture ==
The main plot of Ken Follett's novel, World Without End, is built around a similar letter. However, the fictional letter in the book was written by the King himself, and would have constituted an unquestionable proof.
