= Turbi =

Turbi may refer to:

- Another term for the qanbus, a Yemeni lute
- Druine Turbi, a 1950s French light aircraft
- Turbi (Somalia), a destrict in Balanbale, West Galgaduud.
- Turbi, an area in Marsabit County, Kenya
- Al Turbi, the Lombard language name for the municipality of Retorbido, Pavia province, Italy
- Tu mi turbi ("You Upset Me"), a 1983 Italian comedy film
