= Gremiasco =

- Comune
- Comune di Gremiasco
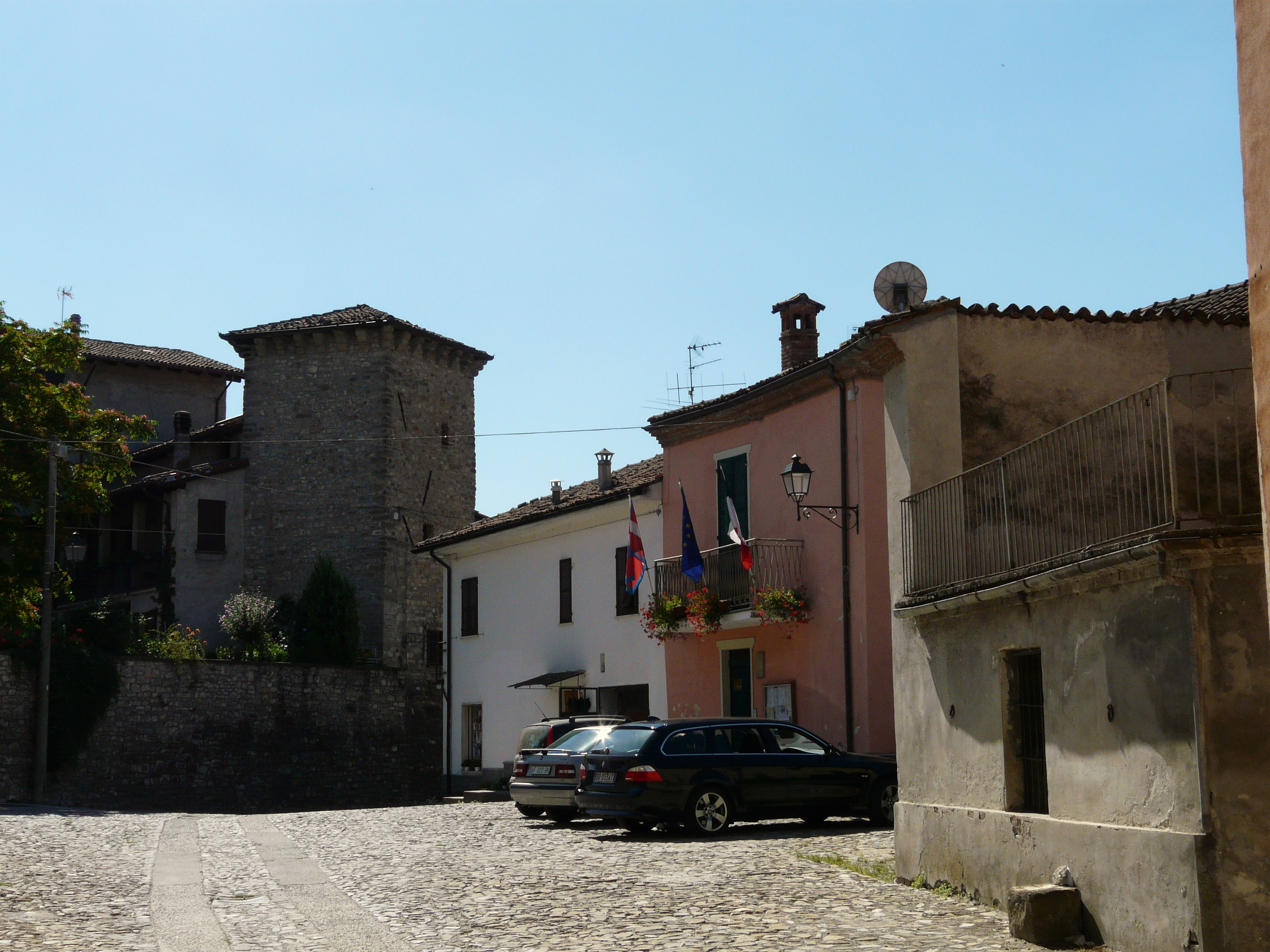

- Location within Italy Location within Piedmont
- Coordinates: 44°47′N 9°6′E
- Country: Italy
- Region: Piedmont
- Province: Alessandria (AL)
- Frazioni: Bernona, Cascina Bricchetti, Cascina Guardamonte, Cascina Marianna, Casotto, Castagnola, Codevico, Colombassi, Fovia, Malvista, Martinetto, Mulino di Colombassi, Musigliano, Pradelle, Principessa, Riarasso, Ronco, Solaro, Stemigliano, Val Beccara

Government
  - Mayor: Germano Giovanni Nuvione

Area
  - Total: 17.38 km^{2} (6.71 sq mi)
- Elevation: 395 m (1,296 ft)

Population (31 August 2017)
  - Total: 318
  - Density: 18.3/km^{2} (47.4/sq mi)
- Demonym: Gremiaschesi
- Time zone: UTC+1 (CET)
  - Summer (DST): UTC+2 (CEST)
- Postal code: 15050
- Dialing code: 0131
- Website: Official website

Gremiasco is a comune (municipality) in the Province of Alessandria in the Italian region Piedmont, located about 110 kilometres (68 mi) southeast of Turin and about 40 kilometres (25 mi) southeast of Alessandria.

Gremiasco borders the following municipalities: Bagnaria, Brignano-Frascata, Cecima, Fabbrica Curone, Montacuto, Ponte Nizza, San Sebastiano Curone, and Varzi.
