= Dernice =

- Comune
- Comune di Dernice
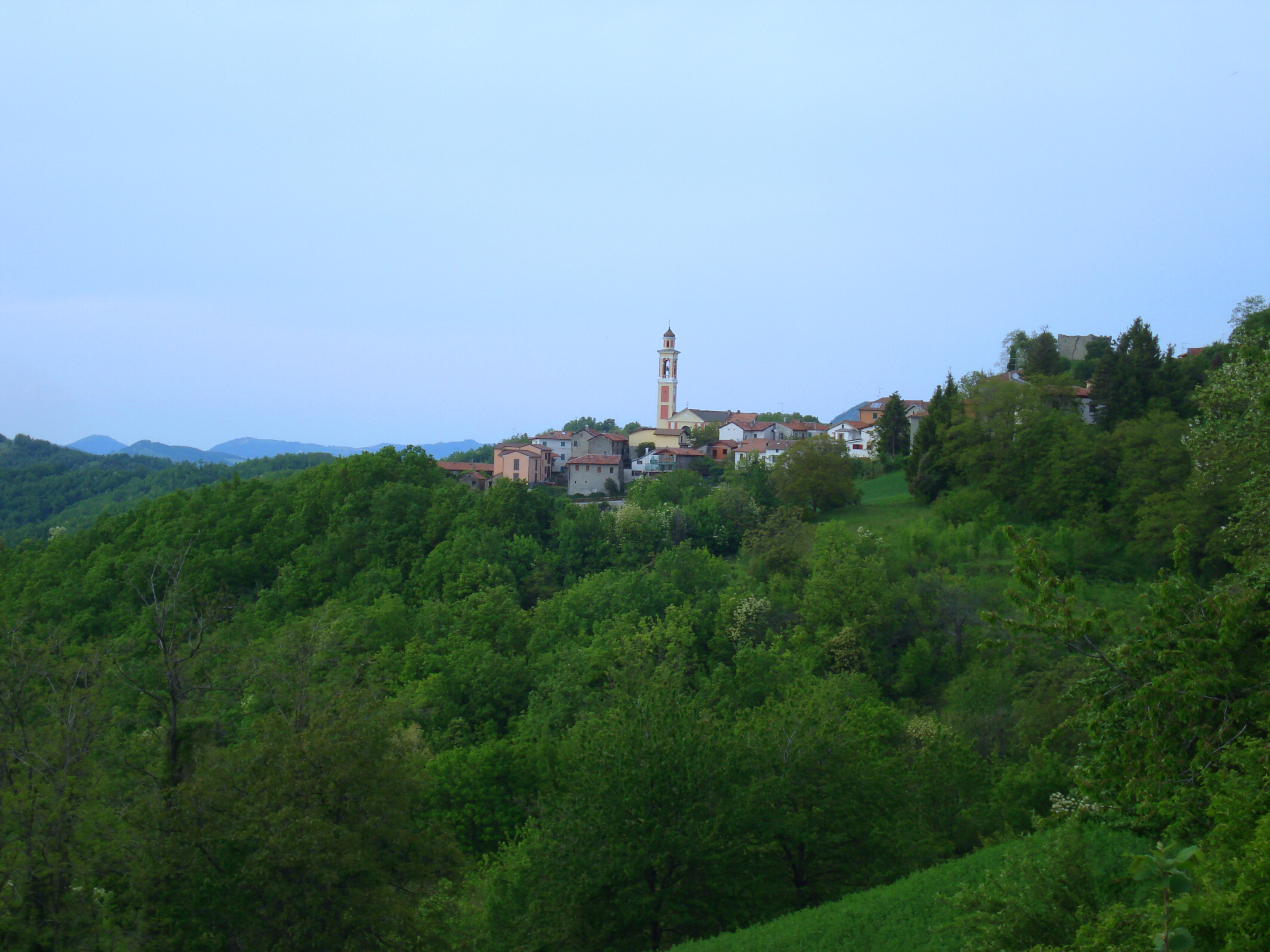

- Location within Italy Location within Piedmont
- Coordinates: 44°46′N 9°3′E
- Country: Italy
- Region: Piedmont
- Province: Alessandria (AL)
- Frazioni: Montebore

Government
  - Mayor: Carlo Buscaglia

Area
  - Total: 18.3 km^{2} (7.1 sq mi)
- Elevation: 600 m (2,000 ft)

Population (30 June 2017)
  - Total: 182
  - Density: 9.95/km^{2} (25.8/sq mi)
- Demonym: Dernicesi
- Time zone: UTC+1 (CET)
  - Summer (DST): UTC+2 (CEST)
- Postal code: 15056
- Dialing code: 0131
- Patron saint: Santa Lucia
- Website: Official website

Dernice is a comune (municipality) in the Province of Alessandria in the Italian region Piedmont, located about 110 kilometres (68 mi) southeast of Turin and about 40 kilometres (25 mi) southeast of Alessandria. It is located across the ancient Salt road, a former commercial road between Genoa and the Padan Plain. It is the seat of production of the Montebore cheese, in the eponymous frazione. It was once home to a castle, now in ruins.

Dernice borders the following municipalities: Borghetto di Borbera, Brignano-Frascata, Cantalupo Ligure, Garbagna, Montacuto, and San Sebastiano Curone.
