= Brignano =

Brignano may refer to:

- Brignano Gera d'Adda, a comune in Lombardy, Italy
- Brignano-Frascata, a comune in Piedmont, Italy
- Brignano, a village frazione of Salerno, Italy
- Enrico Brignano, an Italian actor
