= Brallo di Pregola =

Brallo di Pregola Brallo ad Preigheura (Ligurian)
- Comune
- Comune di Brallo di Pregola
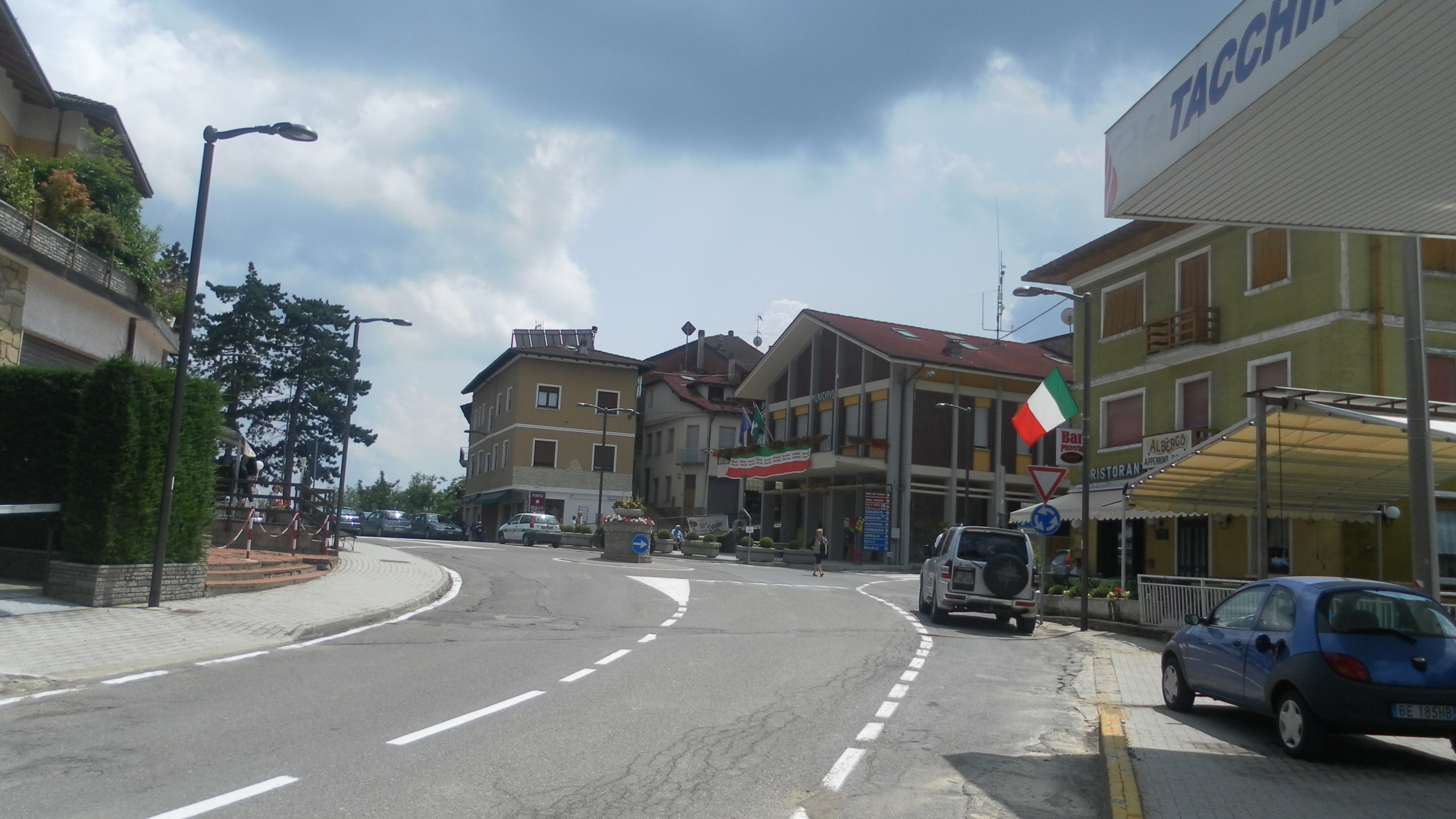
- Piazza del Municipio

- Brallo di Pregola within the Province of Pavia

- Location within Italy Location within Lombardy
- Coordinates: 44°44′N 9°17′E
- Country: Italy
- Region: Lombardy
- Province: Pavia (PV)

Area
  - Total: 46.15 km^{2} (17.82 sq mi)
- Elevation: 951 m (3,120 ft)

Population (2026)
  - Total: 473
  - Density: 10.2/km^{2} (26.5/sq mi)
- Demonym: Brallesi
- Time zone: UTC+1 (CET)
  - Summer (DST): UTC+2 (CEST)
- Postal code: 27050
- Dialing code: 0383

Brallo di Pregola (Ligurian: Brallo ad Preigheura) is a town and comune (municipality) in the Province of Pavia in the region of Lombardy in Italy, located about 80 kilometres (50 mi) south of Milan and about 50 kilometres (31 mi) south of Pavia. It has 473 inhabitants.

== Geography ==
Located in the Oltrepò Pavese, at the borders of Lombardy with Emilia-Romagna, Brallo di Pregola borders the municipalities of Bobbio (PC), Cerignale (PC), Corte Brugnatella (PC), Santa Margherita di Staffora and Zerba (PC).

== Demographics ==
As of 2026, the population is 473, of which 53.9% are male, and 46.1% are female. Minors make up 4.7% of the population, and seniors make up 49.7%.

Historical population

Year	Pop.	±%
1861	2,366	—
1871	2,349	−0.7%
1881	2,418	+2.9%
1901	2,670	+10.4%
1911	2,913	+9.1%
1921	2,702	−7.2%
1931	2,653	−1.8%
1936	2,826	+6.5%

Year	Pop.	±%
1951	2,585	−8.5%
1961	2,231	−13.7%
1971	1,686	−24.4%
1981	1,398	−17.1%
1991	1,183	−15.4%
2001	930	−21.4%
2011	689	−25.9%
2021	514	−25.4%

Source: ISTAT

=== Immigration ===
As of 2025, of the known countries of birth of 473 residents, the most numerous are: Italy (448 – 94.7%), Romania (13 – 2.7%), Cuba (4 – 0.8%), Argentina (3 – 0.6%).
