= Zerba =

Zerba Ṡèrba (Piacentino)
- Comune
- Comune di Zerba
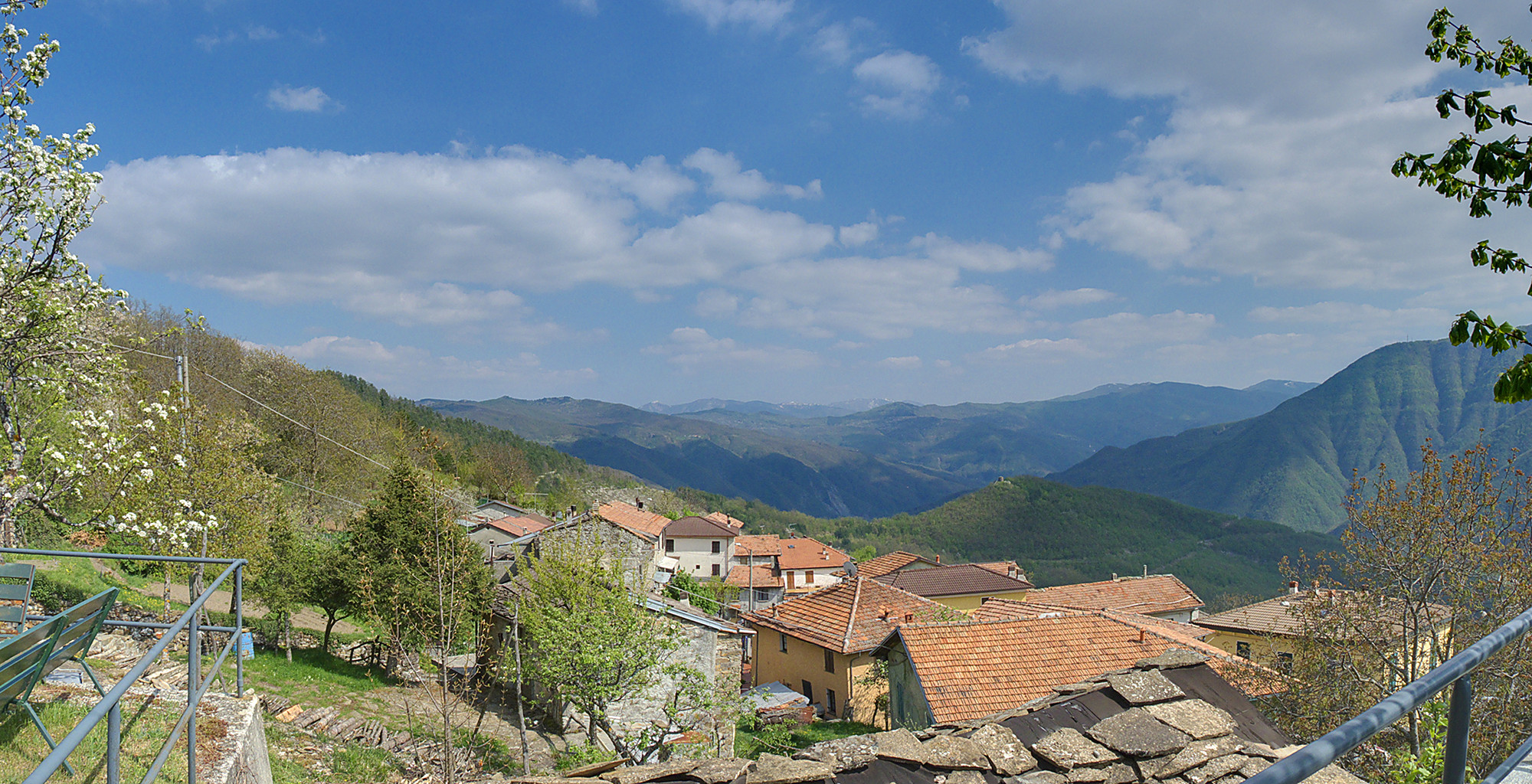
- View of Zerba

- Coat of arms

- Location within Italy Location within Emilia-Romagna
- Coordinates: 44°40′N 9°17′E
- Country: Italy
- Region: Emilia-Romagna
- Province: Piacenza (PC)
- Frazioni: Capannette di Pej, Casa della Torre, Cerreto, Codeviglio, Conca d'Oro, Pej, Samboneto, Vesimo

Government
  - Mayor: Giovanni Razzari

Area
  - Total: 24.13 km^{2} (9.32 sq mi)

Population (2026)
  - Total: 66
  - Density: 2.7/km^{2} (7.1/sq mi)
- Time zone: UTC+1 (CET)
  - Summer (DST): UTC+2 (CEST)
- Postal code: 29020
- Dialing code: 0523
- Website: Official website

Zerba (Piacentino: Ṡèrba) is a village and comune (municipality) in the Province of Piacenza in the region of Emilia-Romagna in Italy, located about 170 kilometres (110 mi) west of Bologna and about 50 kilometres (31 mi) southwest of Piacenza. It has 66 inhabitants.

Zerba borders the municipalities of Brallo di Pregola, Cabella Ligure, Cerignale, Fabbrica Curone, Ottone, and Santa Margherita di Staffora.

== Demographics ==
As of 2026, the population is 66, of which 54.5% are male, and 45.5% are female. Minors make up 6.1% of the population, and seniors make up 45.5%.

Historical population

Year	Pop.	±%
1861	1,556	—
1871	1,647	+5.8%
1881	1,495	−9.2%
1901	1,453	−2.8%
1911	1,335	−8.1%
1921	1,103	−17.4%
1931	928	−15.9%
1936	847	−8.7%

Year	Pop.	±%
1951	699	−17.5%
1961	541	−22.6%
1971	339	−37.3%
1981	199	−41.3%
1991	155	−22.1%
2001	140	−9.7%
2011	92	−34.3%
2021	70	−23.9%

Source: ISTAT

=== Immigration ===
As of 2025, immigrants make up 10.1% of the total population. The foreign countries of birth are Argentina, Costa Rica, Germany, Mozambique, Panama, and Romania.
