= Torrazza Coste =

- Comune
- Comune di Torrazza Coste
- Location within Italy Location within Lombardy
- Coordinates: 44°59′N 9°4′E
- Country: Italy
- Region: Lombardy
- Province: Province of Pavia (PV)

Area
  - Total: 16.1 km^{2} (6.2 sq mi)
- Elevation: 159 m (522 ft)

Population (Dec. 2004)
  - Total: 1,516
  - Density: 94.2/km^{2} (244/sq mi)
- Demonym: Torrazzesi
- Time zone: UTC+1 (CET)
  - Summer (DST): UTC+2 (CEST)
- Postal code: 27050
- Dialing code: 0383

Torrazza Coste is a comune (municipality) in the Province of Pavia in the Italian region Lombardy, located about 50 km (31 mi) south of Milan and about 25 km (16 mi) southwest of Pavia. As of 31 December 2004, it had a population of 1,516 and an area of 16.1 km^{2} (6 sq mi).

Torrazza Coste borders the following municipalities: Borgo Priolo, Codevilla, Montebello della Battaglia, Retorbido, Rocca Susella.

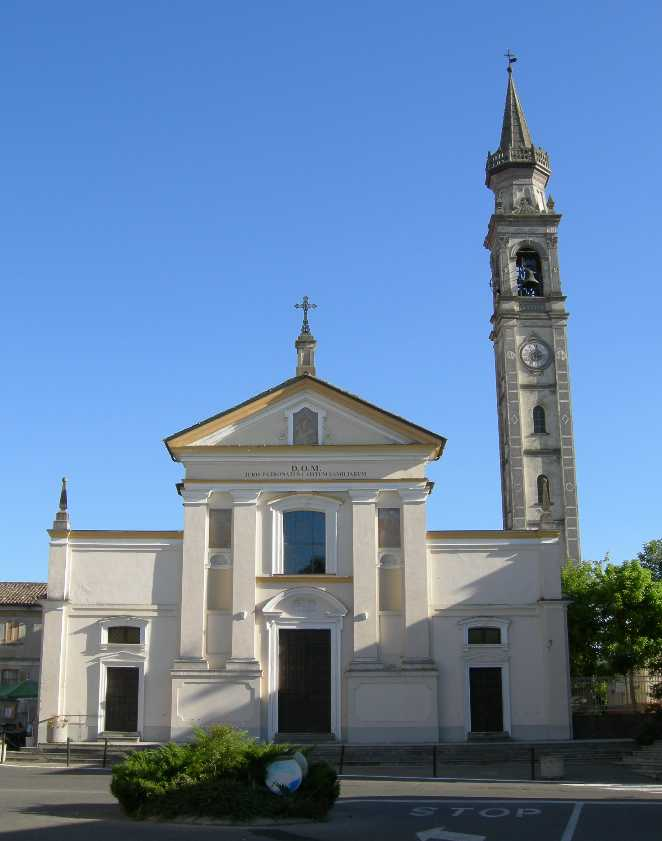

== Demographic evolution ==
Historical population

Year	Pop.	±%
1861	1,574	—
1871	1,687	+7.2%
1881	1,720	+2.0%
1901	2,090	+21.5%
1911	2,367	+13.3%

Year	Pop.	±%
1921	2,323	−1.9%
1931	2,100	−9.6%
1936	2,088	−0.6%
1951	1,963	−6.0%
1961	1,776	−9.5%

Year	Pop.	±%
1971	1,519	−14.5%
1981	1,363	−10.3%
1991	1,400	+2.7%
2001	1,518	+8.4%

Source: Data from ISTAT
