= Fabbrica Curone =

- Comune
- Comune di Fabbrica Curone
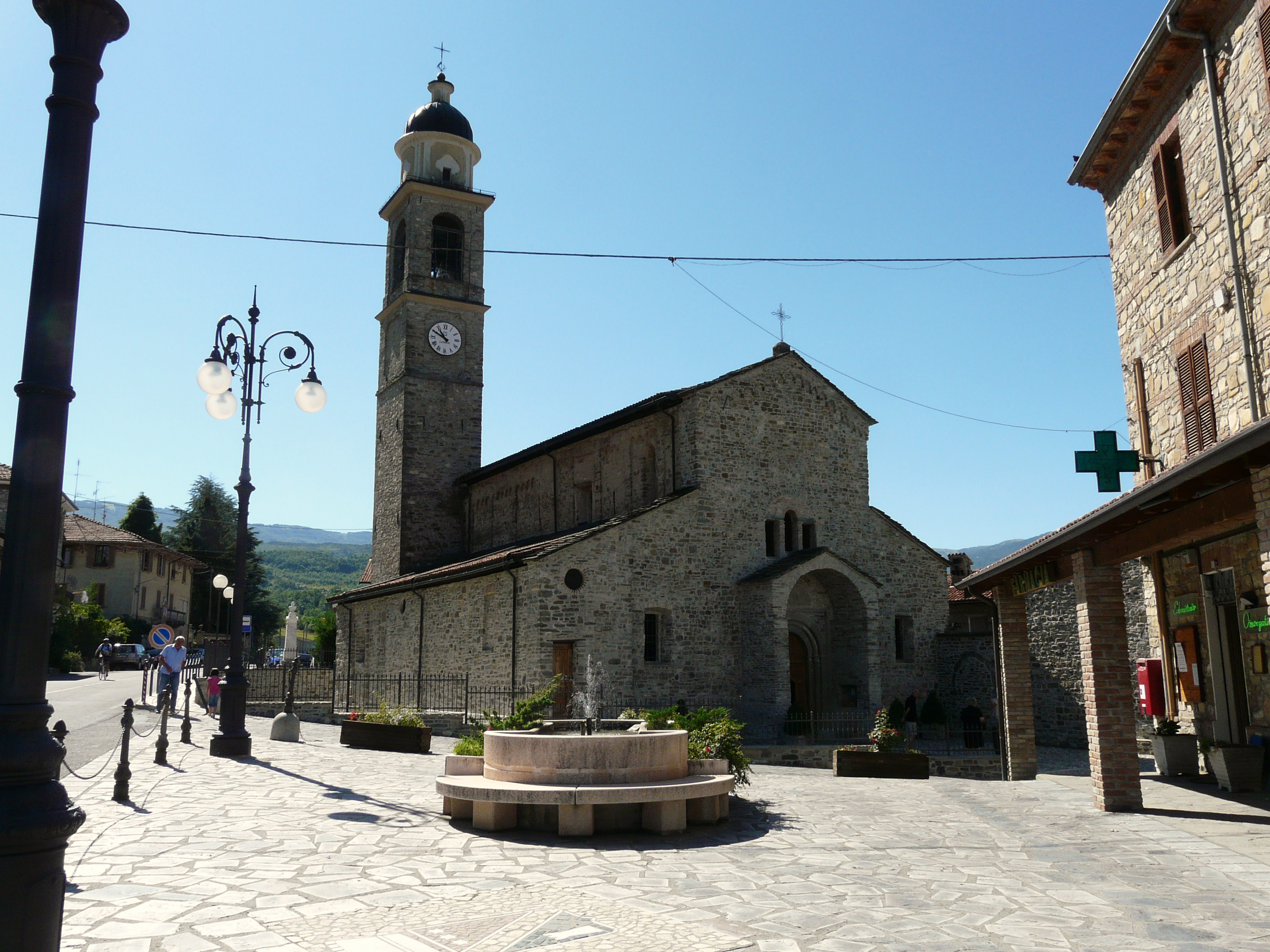

- Coat of arms

- Location within Italy Location within Piedmont
- Coordinates: 44°47′N 9°8′E
- Country: Italy
- Region: Piedmont
- Province: Alessandria (AL)
- Frazioni: Caldirola, Forotondo, Selvapiana, Garadassi, Montecapraro, Salogni, Bruggi, Lunassi, Pareto, Morigliassi

Area
  - Total: 53.7 km^{2} (20.7 sq mi)
- Elevation: 440 m (1,440 ft)

Population (Dec. 2004)
  - Total: 808
  - Density: 15.0/km^{2} (39.0/sq mi)
- Demonym: Fabbricacuronesi
- Time zone: UTC+1 (CET)
  - Summer (DST): UTC+2 (CEST)
- Postal code: 15050
- Dialing code: 0131
- Patron saint: Santa Maria Assunta
- Website: Official website

Fabbrica Curone (Piedmontese: Frògna) is a comune (municipality) in the Province of Alessandria in the Italian region Piedmont, located in the upper valley of the Curone stream, about 120 kilometres (75 mi) southeast of Turin and about 45 kilometres (28 mi) southeast of Alessandria.

Fabbrica Curone borders the following municipalities: Albera Ligure, Cabella Ligure, Gremiasco, Montacuto, Santa Margherita di Staffora, Varzi, and Zerba.

== History ==
A possession of the Abbey of San Colombano of Bobbio, it received a castle and was under the bishops of Tortona after 1157. Later it was an imperial fief under the Malaspina, who held it until 1797.

== Main sights ==
- Pieve of Santa Maria Assunta, a Romanesque edifice with a stone portal surmounted by a Romanesque lunette.
- Museum of the Peasant Civilization, in the frazione of Lunassi.

The other frazione of Caldirola, elevation 1,110 metres (3,640 ft) is a ski resort.

== Demographic evolution ==
Historical population

Year	Pop.	±%
1861	2,402	—
1871	2,586	+7.7%
1881	2,677	+3.5%
1901	3,245	+21.2%
1911	2,975	−8.3%

Year	Pop.	±%
1921	2,929	−1.5%
1931	2,567	−12.4%
1936	2,585	+0.7%
1951	2,147	−16.9%
1961	1,827	−14.9%

Year	Pop.	±%
1971	1,424	−22.1%
1981	1,126	−20.9%
1991	952	−15.5%
2001	838	−12.0%

Source: Data from ISTAT
