= Rivanazzano Terme =

- Comune
- Comune di Rivanazzano Terme
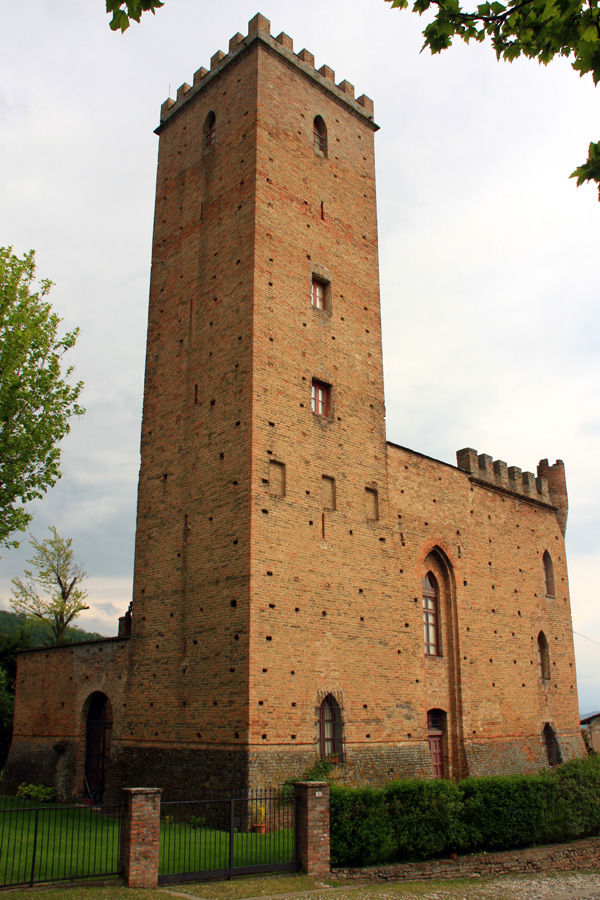

- Location within Italy Location within Lombardy
- Coordinates: 44°56′N 9°1′E
- Country: Italy
- Region: Lombardy
- Province: Pavia (PV)

Area
  - Total: 29.0 km^{2} (11.2 sq mi)
- Elevation: 153 m (502 ft)

Population (30 November 2017)
  - Total: 5,346
  - Density: 184/km^{2} (477/sq mi)
- Demonym: Rivanazzanesi
- Time zone: UTC+1 (CET)
  - Summer (DST): UTC+2 (CEST)
- Postal code: 27055
- Dialing code: 0383

Rivanazzano Terme (Lombard: La Riva; known simply as Rivanazzano before 30 July 2009) is a comune (municipality) in the Province of Pavia in the Italian region Lombardy. It is located in the Oltrepò Pavese on the Staffora torrent, about 60 km south of Milan, about 30 km southwest of Pavia and on the boundary with the Province of Alessandria.

Rivanazzano Terme borders the following municipalities: Casalnoceto, Godiasco, Pontecurone, Retorbido, Rocca Susella, Voghera.
