= Cerignale =

- Comune
- Comune di Cerignale
- Location within Italy Location within Emilia-Romagna
- Coordinates: 44°41′N 9°21′E
- Country: Italy
- Region: Emilia-Romagna
- Province: Province of Piacenza (PC)
- Frazioni: Cà d'Abrà, Cariseto, Carisasca, Casale, Castello, La Serra, Lisore, Loc. Madonna, Oneto, Ponte Organasco, Rovereto, Santa Maria, Selva, Zermogliana

Government
  - Mayor: Fausta Pizzaghi

Area
  - Total: 31.5 km^{2} (12.2 sq mi)

Population (Dec. 2004)
  - Total: 197
  - Density: 6.25/km^{2} (16.2/sq mi)
- Demonym: Cerignalesi
- Time zone: UTC+1 (CET)
  - Summer (DST): UTC+2 (CEST)
- Postal code: 29020
- Dialing code: 0523
- Website: Official website

Cerignale (Ligurian: Serignâ, locally Sergnâ; Piacentino: Cerignäl) is a comune (municipality) in the Province of Piacenza in the Italian region Emilia-Romagna, located about 160 kilometres (99 mi) west of Bologna and about 50 kilometres (31 mi) southwest of Piacenza. As of 31 December 2004, it had a population of 197 and an area of 31.5 square kilometres (12.2 mi^{2}).

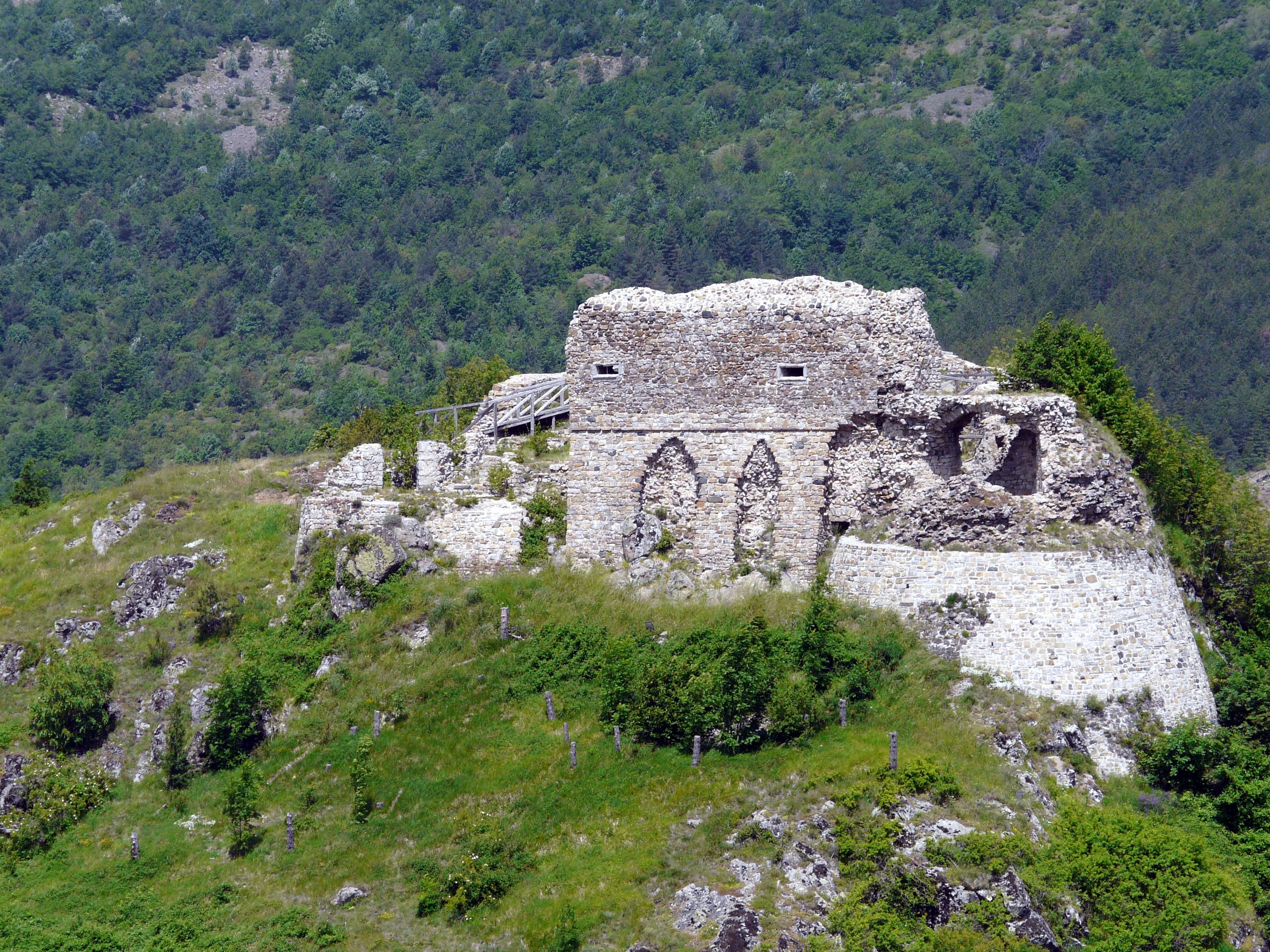
The old castle

The municipality of Cerignale contains the frazioni (subdivisions, mainly villages and hamlets) Cà d'Abrà, Cariseto, Carisasca, Casale, Castello, La Serra, Lisore, Loc. Madonna, Oneto, Ponte Organasco, Rovereto, Santa Maria, Selva, and Zermogliana.

Cerignale borders the following municipalities: Brallo di Pregola, Corte Brugnatella, Ferriere, Ottone, Zerba.

== Demographic evolution ==
Historical population

Year	Pop.	±%
1861	1,264	—
1871	1,286	+1.7%
1881	1,111	−13.6%
1901	1,153	+3.8%
1911	1,053	−8.7%

Year	Pop.	±%
1921	1,146	+8.8%
1931	1,037	−9.5%
1936	938	−9.5%
1951	889	−5.2%
1961	772	−13.2%

Year	Pop.	±%
1971	607	−21.4%
1981	454	−25.2%
1991	317	−30.2%
2001	224	−29.3%

Source: Data from ISTAT
