= Codevilla =

- Comune
- Comune di Codevilla
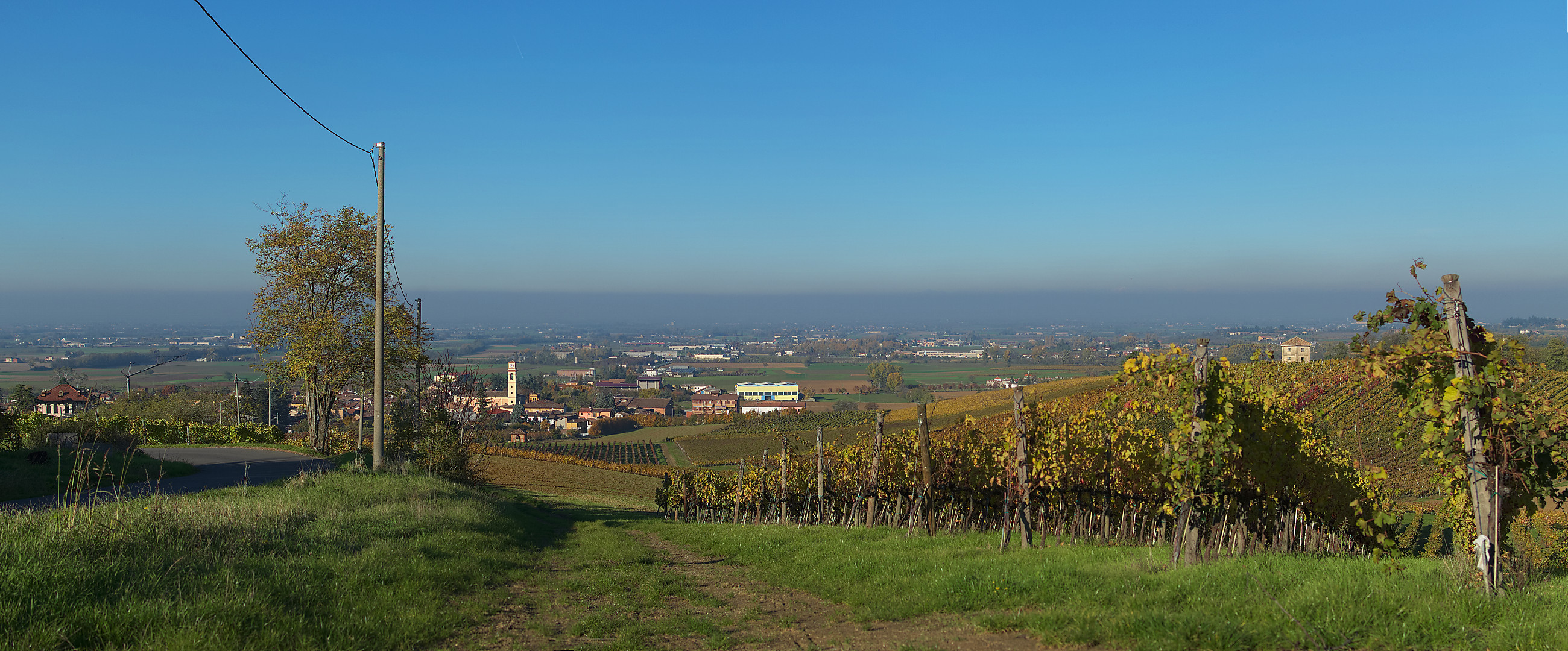

- Location within Italy Location within Lombardy
- Coordinates: 44°58′N 9°3′E
- Country: Italy
- Region: Lombardy
- Province: Province of Pavia (PV)

Area
  - Total: 13.0 km^{2} (5.0 sq mi)

Population (Dec. 2004)
  - Total: 955
  - Density: 73.5/km^{2} (190/sq mi)
- Demonym: Codevillesi
- Time zone: UTC+1 (CET)
  - Summer (DST): UTC+2 (CEST)
- Postal code: 27050
- Dialing code: 0383

Codevilla is a comune (municipality) in the Province of Pavia in the Italian region Lombardy, located about 60 km (37 mi) south of Milan and about 25 km (16 mi) southwest of Pavia. As of 31 December 2004, it had a population of 955 and an area of 13.0 km^{2} (5.0 sq mi).

Codevilla borders the following municipalities: Montebello della Battaglia, Retorbido, Torrazza Coste, Voghera.

== Demographic evolution ==
Historical population

Year	Pop.	±%
1861	1,784	—
1871	1,843	+3.3%
1881	1,937	+5.1%
1901	2,123	+9.6%
1911	2,138	+0.7%

Year	Pop.	±%
1921	2,032	−5.0%
1931	2,035	+0.1%
1936	1,715	−15.7%
1951	1,635	−4.7%
1961	1,503	−8.1%

Year	Pop.	±%
1971	1,333	−11.3%
1981	1,160	−13.0%
1991	974	−16.0%
2001	917	−5.9%

Source: Data from ISTAT
