= Momperone =

- Comune
- Comune di Momperone
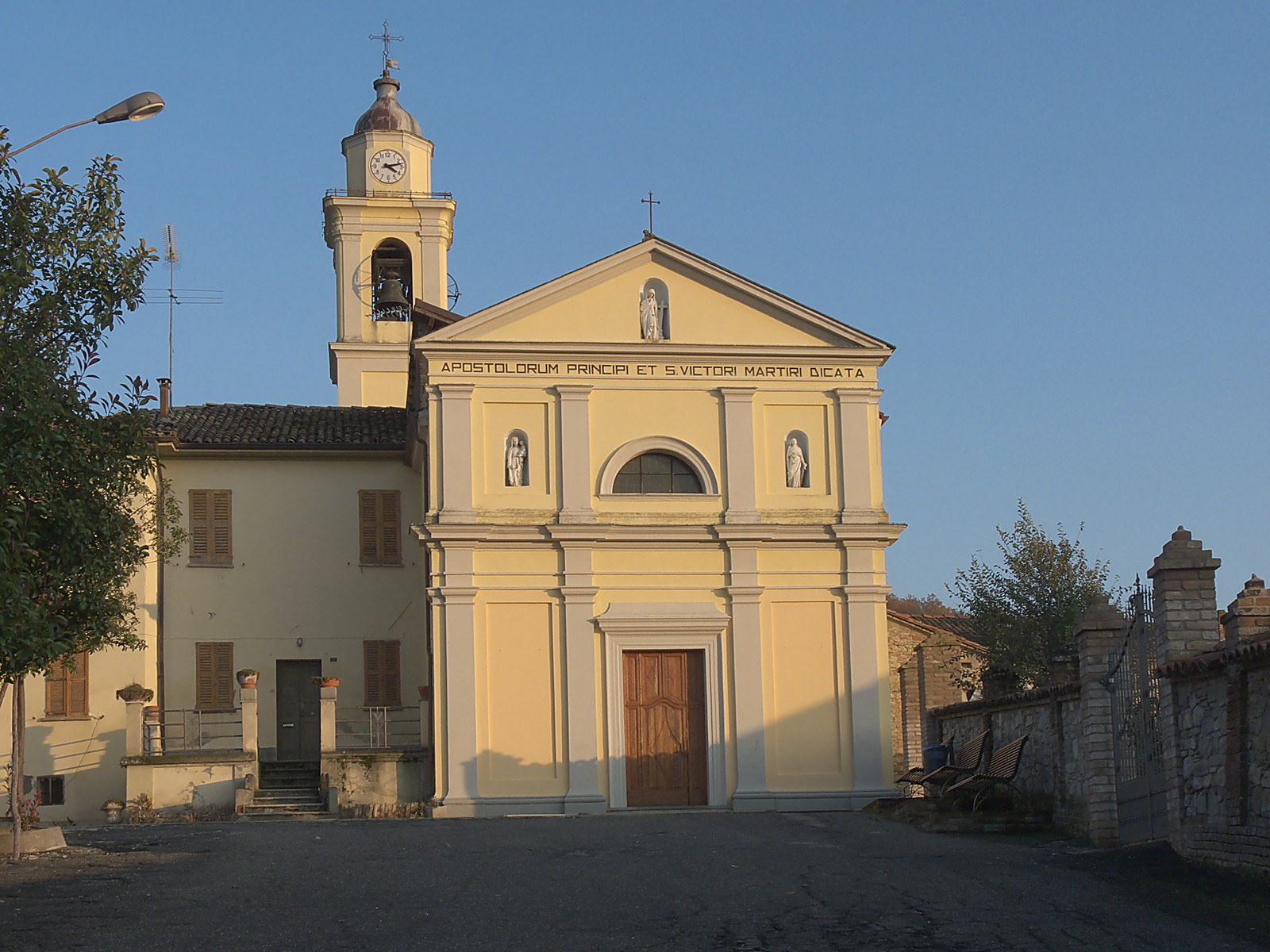
- The Church of Momperone

- Location within Italy Location within Piedmont
- Coordinates: 44°50′N 9°2′E
- Country: Italy
- Region: Piedmont
- Province: Alessandria (AL)

Government
  - Mayor: Claudio Penacca

Area
  - Total: 8.54 km^{2} (3.30 sq mi)
- Elevation: 279 m (915 ft)

Population (31 October 2017)
  - Total: 223
  - Density: 26.1/km^{2} (67.6/sq mi)
- Demonym: Momperonesi
- Time zone: UTC+1 (CET)
  - Summer (DST): UTC+2 (CEST)
- Postal code: 15050
- Dialing code: 0131
- Website: Official website

Momperone is a comune (municipality) in the Province of Alessandria in the Italian region Piedmont, located about 110 kilometres (68 mi) east of Turin and about 35 kilometres (22 mi) southeast of Alessandria.

Momperone borders the following municipalities: Brignano-Frascata, Casasco, Cecima, Montemarzino, and Pozzol Groppo.
