= Cecima =

- Comune
- Comune di Cecima
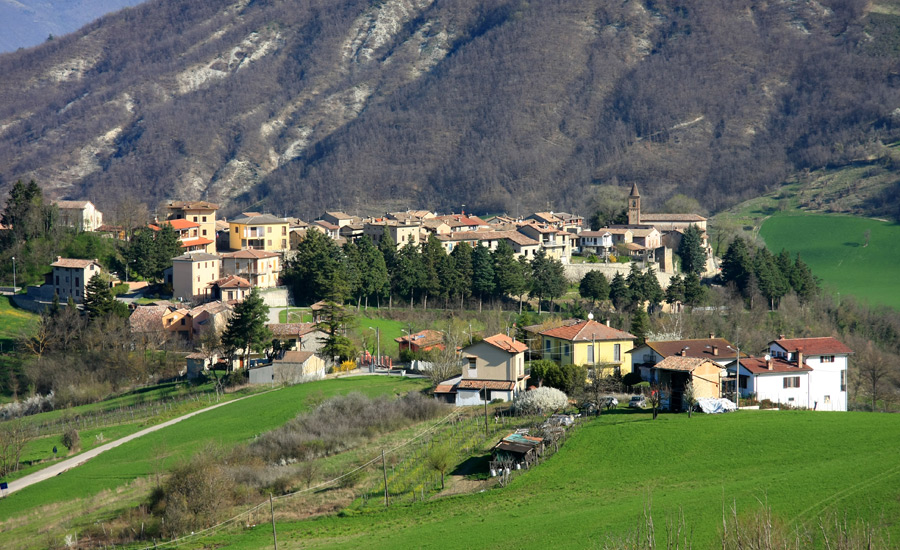

- Location within Italy Location within Lombardy
- Coordinates: 44°51′N 9°5′E
- Country: Italy
- Region: Lombardy
- Province: Pavia (PV)

Government
  - Mayor: Andrea Milanesi

Area
  - Total: 10.12 km^{2} (3.91 sq mi)
- Elevation: 331 m (1,086 ft)

Population (30 June 2017) 1
  - Total: 242
  - Density: 23.9/km^{2} (61.9/sq mi)
- Demonym: Cecimesi
- Time zone: UTC+1 (CET)
  - Summer (DST): UTC+2 (CEST)
- Postal code: 27050
- Dialing code: 0383
- Website: Official website

Cecima is a comune (municipality) in the Province of Pavia in the Italian region Lombardy, located about 70 km south of Milan and about 35 km south of Pavia.

Cecima borders the following municipalities: Brignano-Frascata, Godiasco, Gremiasco, Momperone, Ponte Nizza, Pozzol Groppo.
