= Pozzol Groppo =

- Comune
- Comune di Pozzol Groppo
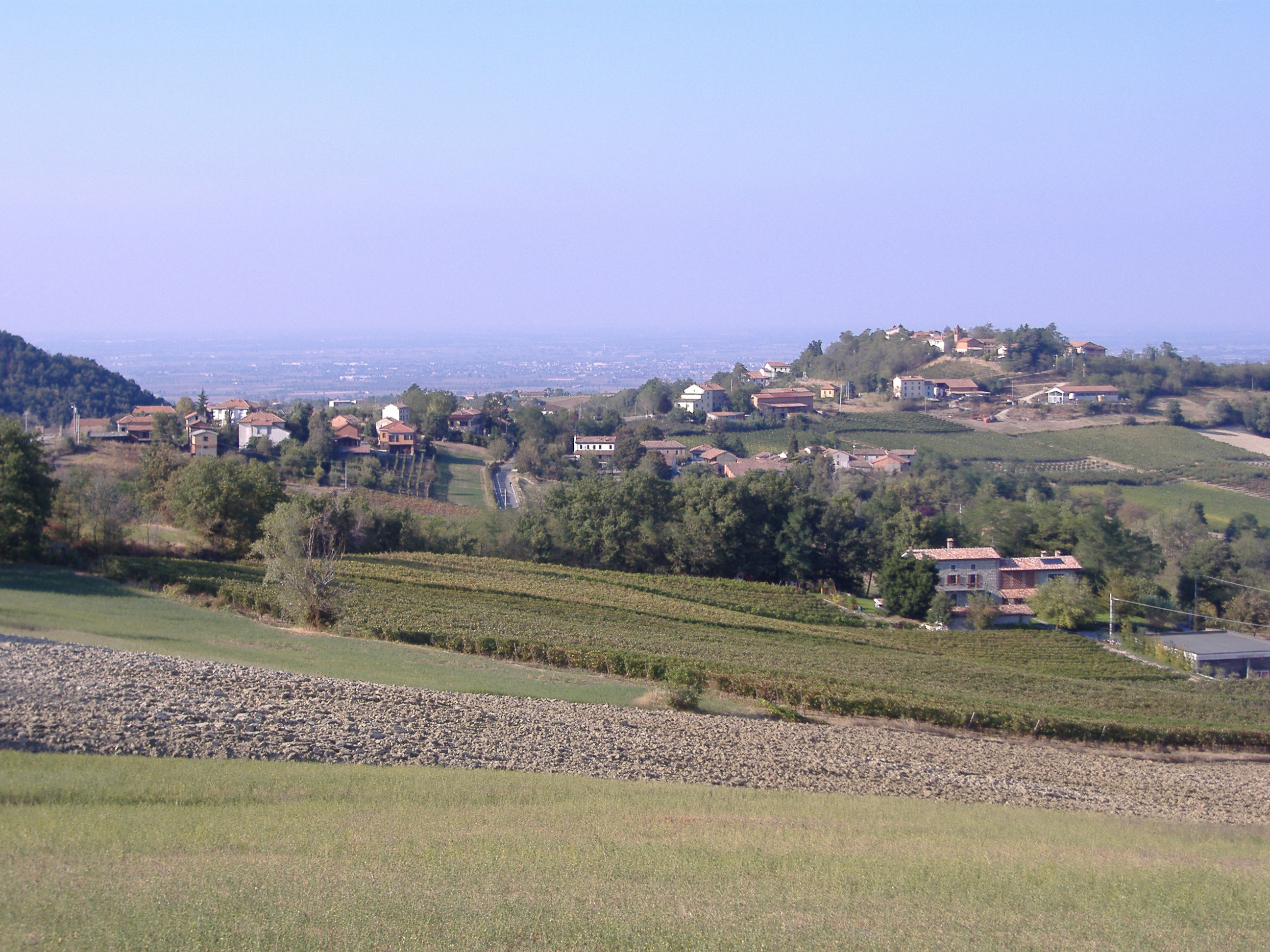

- Location within Italy Location within Piedmont
- Coordinates: 44°53′N 9°2′E
- Country: Italy
- Region: Piedmont
- Province: Alessandria (AL)
- Frazioni: Biagasco, Brienzone, Ca' D'Andrino, Ca' di Bruno, Casa Franchini, Casa Lucchi, Fracchio, Groppo Superiore, Monastero, Mongarizzo, Montemerlano, Monticelli, San Lorenzo (City Hall)

Government
  - Mayor: Pietro Draghi

Area
  - Total: 13.9 km^{2} (5.4 sq mi)
- Elevation: 200 m (660 ft)

Population (30 November 2017)
  - Total: 304
  - Density: 21.9/km^{2} (56.6/sq mi)
- Demonym: Pozzolgroppesi
- Time zone: UTC+1 (CET)
  - Summer (DST): UTC+2 (CEST)
- Postal code: 15050
- Dialing code: 0131

Pozzol Groppo is a comune (municipality) in the Province of Alessandria in the Italian region Piedmont, located about 110 kilometres (68 mi) east of Turin and about 35 kilometres (22 mi) east of Alessandria.

Pozzol Groppo borders the following municipalities: Cecima, Godiasco, Momperone, Montemarzino, and Volpedo.

The actual comune was formed from the merging, in 1929, of the two previous Pozzolo del Groppo and Groppo.

== History ==
Documents prove that Pozzolo del Groppo and Pozzolo have been under the dominion of the city of Tortona since the twelfth century, so much so that they rushed to the aid of the latter when it was besieged by Frederick Barbarossa in 1155.

In 1449 the area came under the control of the Sforza family of Milan, who in 1480 sent an expedition to punish the people of Pozzolo, accused of being a den of bandits.

In 1530 the marquis Cesare Malaspina of Godiasco took control and rebuilt the castle, then came the marquises of Gavi and finally, in 1595, the Spinola family on behalf of the Duchy of Milan.

Joined with the territories of Bobbio to the Kingdom of Sardinia in 1743, according to the Treaty of Worms, then became part of the province of Bobbio. In 1801 the territory was annexed to France by Napoleon, until 1814. In 1818 it passed to the province of Voghera and in 1859 to the province of Pavia.

In 1928 the Groppo and Pozzolo were aggregated, forming the current Pozzol Groppo and being included in the province of Alessandria.

During World War II was the scene of battles between partisans and fascists. On January 31, 1945, in the hamlet of Biagasco, a military unit of fascists surprised and killed in the night some members of a partisan division. A shrine remembers the massacre.

== Main sights ==
- The Malaspina castle, a powerful and noble family, feudal lord and lady of the lands of Pozzol Groppo for centuries, was built on the site of a Roman watch tower. The imposing building preserves inside a beautiful courtyard with a medieval well and sumptuous rooms with fireplaces, wooden ceilings and fresco decoration, keeping alive the prestige of an illustrious past.
- The parish church, dedicated to San Lorenzo, is first documented in the 16th century.
- In the hamlet of Biagasco is the oldest church in the village, mentioned in documents of the twelfth century
- Near the church the shrine erected in memory of the 1945 massacre.
