= Montacuto =

- Comune
- Comune di Montacuto
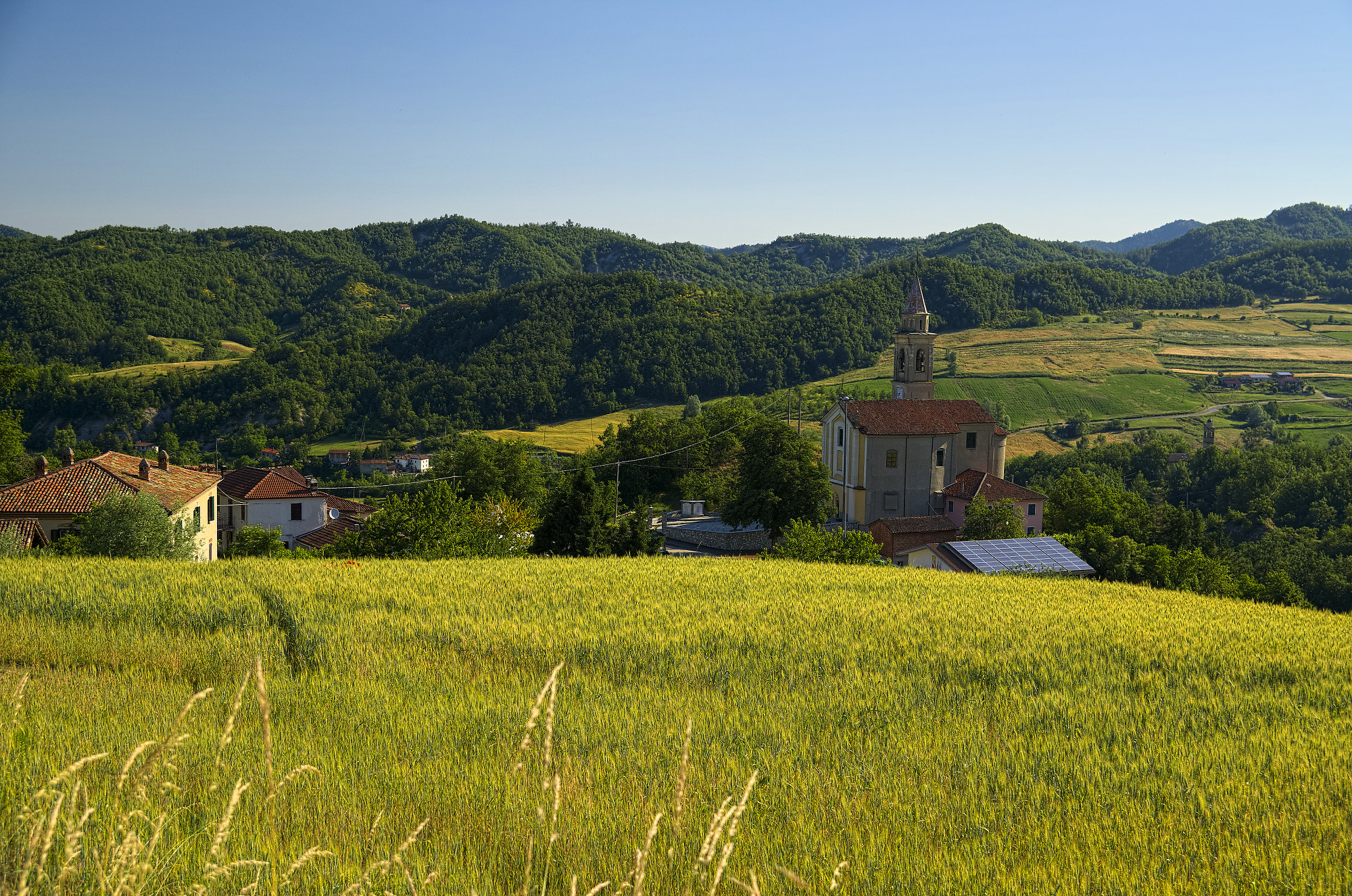

- Location within Italy Location within Piedmont
- Coordinates: 44°46′N 9°6′E
- Country: Italy
- Region: Piedmont
- Province: Alessandria (AL)

Government
  - Mayor: Giovanni Carlo Ferrari

Area
  - Total: 23.7 km^{2} (9.2 sq mi)
- Elevation: 525 m (1,722 ft)

Population (31 October 2017)
  - Total: 263
  - Density: 11.1/km^{2} (28.7/sq mi)
- Demonym: Monteacutesi
- Time zone: UTC+1 (CET)
  - Summer (DST): UTC+2 (CEST)
- Postal code: 15050
- Dialing code: 0131

Montacuto is a comune (municipality) in the Province of Alessandria in the Italian region Piedmont, located about 120 kilometres (75 mi) southeast of Turin and about 40 kilometres (25 mi) southeast of Alessandria.

Montacuto borders the following municipalities: Albera Ligure, Cantalupo Ligure, Dernice, Fabbrica Curone, Gremiasco, and San Sebastiano Curone.
