= Bagnaria =

Bagnaria Bagnèra (Lombard)
- Comune
- Comune di Bagnaria
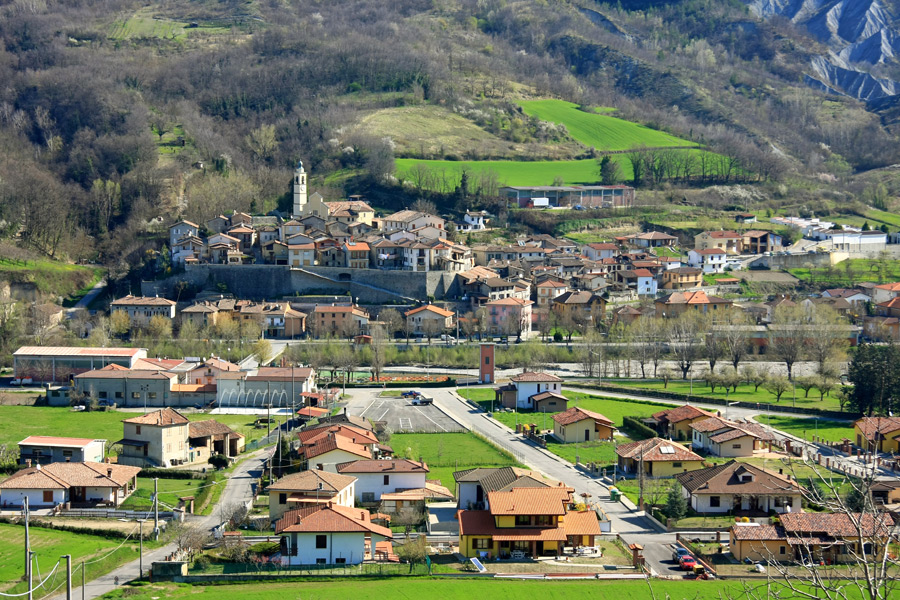
- View of Bagnaria

- Location within Italy Location within Lombardy
- Coordinates: 44°50′N 9°7′E
- Country: Italy
- Region: Lombardy
- Province: Province of Pavia (PV)

Area
  - Total: 16.6 km^{2} (6.4 sq mi)

Population (Dec. 2004)
  - Total: 640
  - Density: 39/km^{2} (100/sq mi)
- Time zone: UTC+1 (CET)
  - Summer (DST): UTC+2 (CEST)
- Postal code: 27050
- Dialing code: 0383

Bagnaria (Lombard: Bagnèra) is a comune (municipality) in the Province of Pavia in the Italian region of Lombardy, located about 70 km (43 mi) south of Milan and about 40 km (25 mi) south of Pavia. As of 31 December 2004, it had a population of 640 and an area of 16.6 km^{2} (6.4 sq mi).

Bagnaria borders the following municipalities: Gremiasco, Ponte Nizza, Varzi.

== Demographic evolution ==
Historical population

Year	Pop.	±%
1861	835	—
1871	896	+7.3%
1881	920	+2.7%
1901	747	−18.8%
1911	861	+15.3%

Year	Pop.	±%
1921	973	+13.0%
1931	981	+0.8%
1936	1,025	+4.5%
1951	1,008	−1.7%
1961	776	−23.0%

Year	Pop.	±%
1971	647	−16.6%
1981	675	+4.3%
1991	689	+2.1%
2001	639	−7.3%

Source: Data from ISTAT
