= Rocca Susella =

- Comune
- Comune di Rocca Susella
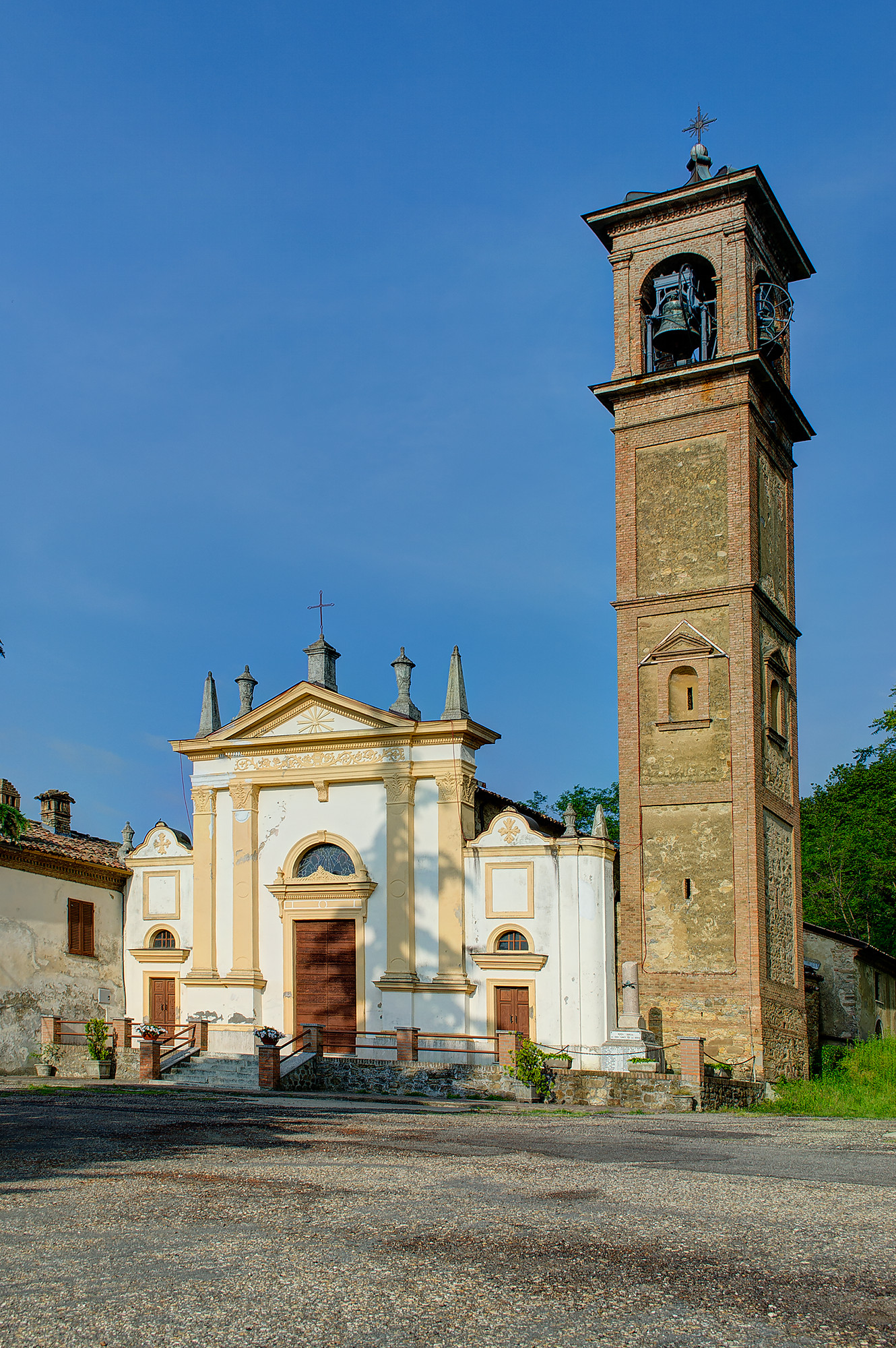

- Location within Italy Location within Lombardy
- Coordinates: 44°55′N 9°5′E
- Country: Italy
- Region: Lombardy
- Province: Pavia (PV)

Government
  - Mayor: Pierluigi Barzon

Area
  - Total: 12.9 km^{2} (5.0 sq mi)
- Elevation: 525 m (1,722 ft)

Population (31 December 2010)
  - Total: 237
  - Density: 18.4/km^{2} (47.6/sq mi)
- Demonym: Roccasusellesi
- Time zone: UTC+1 (CET)
  - Summer (DST): UTC+2 (CEST)
- Postal code: 27052
- Dialing code: 0383

Rocca Susella is a comune (municipality) in the Province of Pavia in the Italian region Lombardy, located about 60 km south of Milan and about 30 km south of Pavia.

Rocca Susella borders the following municipalities: Borgo Priolo, Godiasco, Montesegale, Retorbido, Rivanazzano Terme, Torrazza Coste.
