= Tempio della Fraternità dei Popoli =

Roman Catholic sanctuary or church in Lombardy, Italy

The Tempio della Fraternitá dei Popoli (Temple of Peoples' Fraternity) is a Roman Catholic sanctuary or church located on the top of a hill in Cella di Varzi, a small village close to Varzi, in the province of Pavia, region of Lombardy, Italy.

== History ==
A small rural sanctuary was present at the site. However, the present structure mainly results from the obsession of a former military chaplain, don Adamo Accosa of the Division Monterosa, the alpine army during the Repubblica Sociale Italiana, who wished to literally create a temple from the ruins left after World War II and other conflicts, as a way to promote convivenza (more akin to common living in English), or confraternity, among humanity.

Starting in 1951-1952, he began to request fragments and remnants of the prior war to embellish as spolia for the church. In this goal, he was aided and encouraged by the Apostolic Nunzio Monsignor Angelo Roncalli (later Pope John XXIII), who provided him with stones from an altar from a church near Coutances, fragmented during the battle of Normandy in 1944. Other such fragments have been collected from throughout Europe and other sites in the world.

The baptismal font is built from the remnants of a cannon turret of the Italian battleship Andrea Doria. A crucifix is made from rifles and pistols. The pulpit is made from portions of a British landing craft. However, much of the grounds awkwardly garners the appearance of military museum with displays of uniforms, weapons, and military machinery, rather than a sanctuary dedicated to the abhorrence of war. Some of the monuments are dedicated to battle groups, or to carabinieri.
