= Chiesa dei Cappuccini, Varzi =

Roman Catholic church in Lombardy, Italy

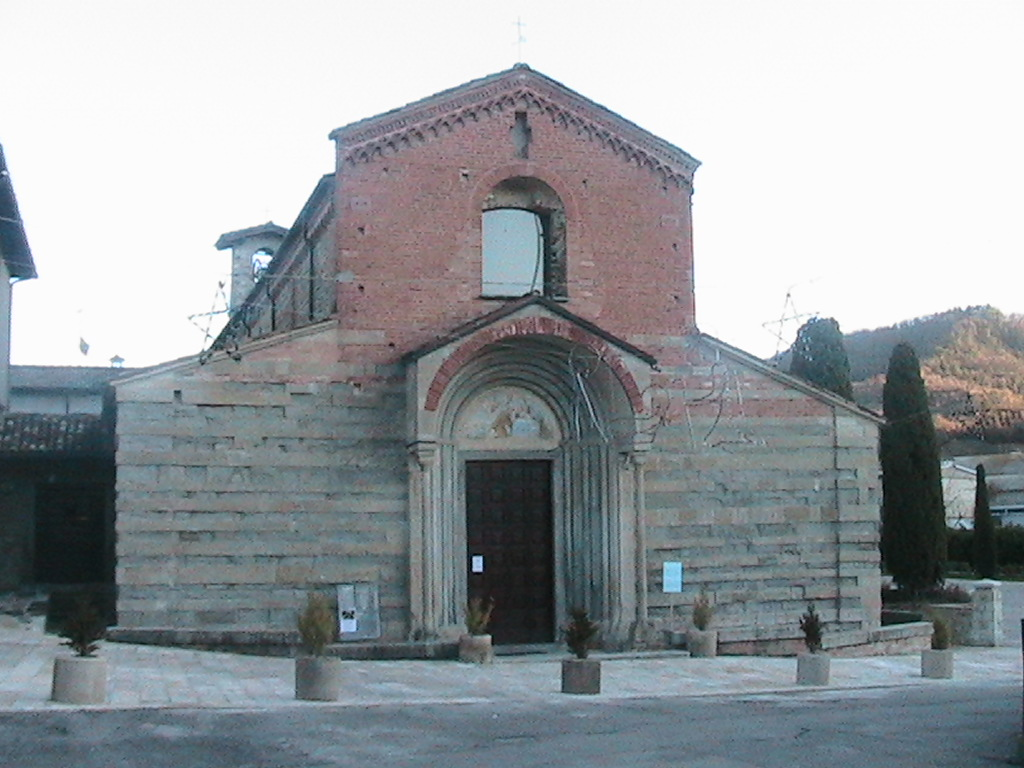
Varzi - Capuchin Church - facade

The Chiesa dei Cappuccini or Church of the Capuchin Monks is a Romanesque style, Roman Catholic church in the town of Varzi, province of Pavia, region of Lombardy, Italy.

== History ==
Construction of the church began in the 12th century and was only completed by the early 14th century. The façade with a local stone base, and brick superior zone has a portal with multiple columns and a fresco in the lunette from the 17th century. In 1623 the Cappuccini (a Franciscan order) were assigned to this church. They erected an adjacent convent, and remained here until suppressed by the Napoleonic government in 1802.

The Capuchin order returned and reconsecrated the church in 1903. During restorations in the 1971, a large fresco was found in the apse, depicting the Annunciation. The work is attributed to two friars, Franceschino and Manfredino Baxilio, and dated to 1484. Of the fresco, only the Virgin remains. The apse maintains the baroque wooden altar with a painting of the Madonna della Neve, St Francis and St Lawrence of Brindisi. In the left nave is a canvas by Guglielmo Caccia, detto il Moncalvo, and in the right nave is a Madonna with St Felice da Cantalice, attributed to a son of Moncalvo.
