= Chiesa dei Rossi, Varzi =

Roman Catholic church in Lombardy, Italy

Coordinates: 44°49′23″N 9°11′47″E

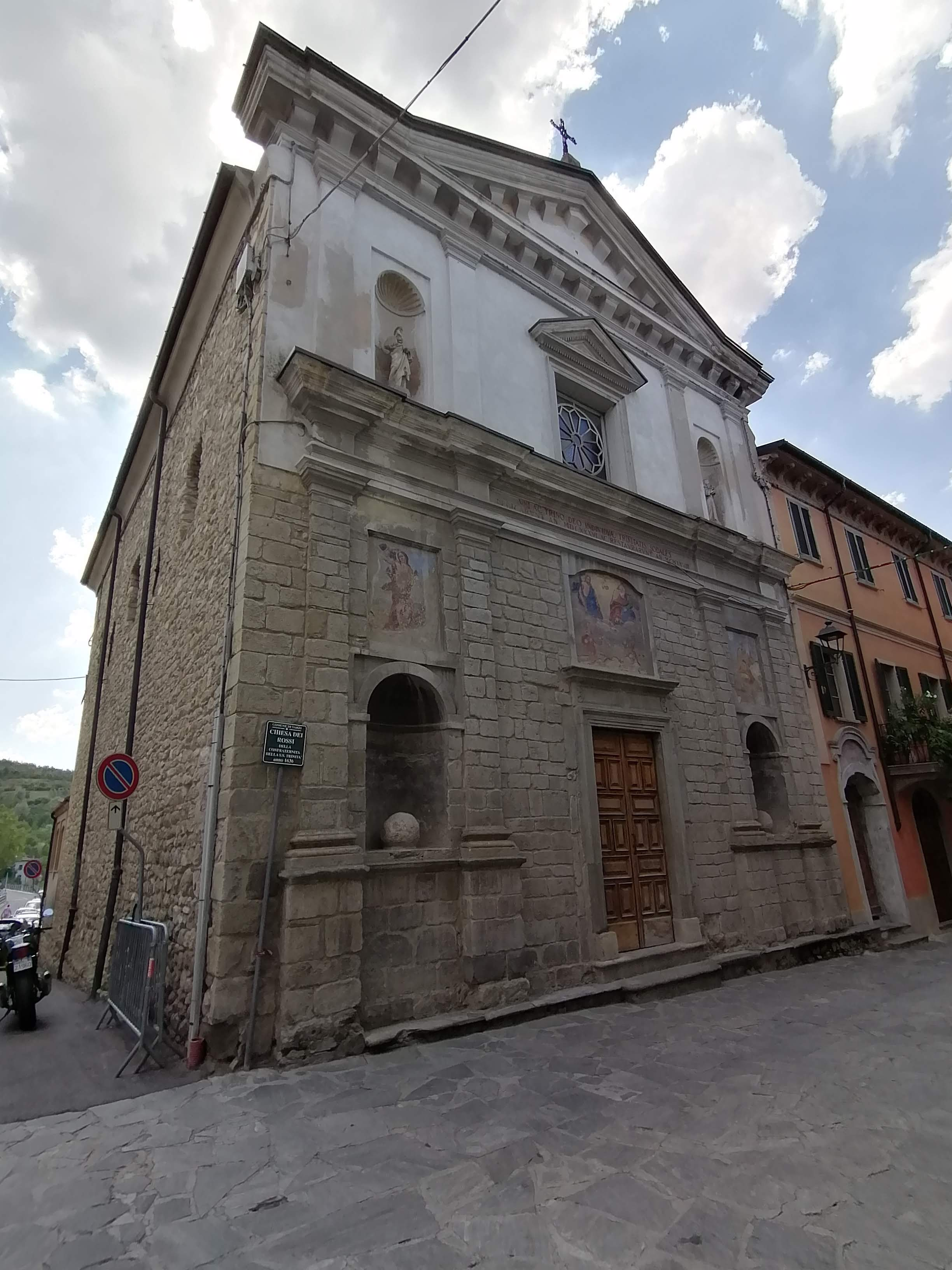

The Chiesa dei Rossi or Church of the Red is a Baroque-style, Roman Catholic small church in the town of Varzi, province of Pavia, region of Lombardy, Italy. The church was originally an oratory of a confraternity of flagellants (battuti), the Confraternity of the Holiest Trinity, known for the red (Rossi) color in their processional vestments.

== History ==
Located within the medieval walls, an oratory was first erected here in 1275. The present church was rebuilt by 1636. The single nave contains a wooden statue of a Guardian Angel (1684) by Antonio Perico, with gilding by Ambrogio Giussano. The walnut pulpit is carved in 15th-century style.
