= Santa Margherita di Staffora =

- Comune
- Comune di Santa Margherita di Staffora
- Location within Italy Location within Lombardy
- Coordinates: 44°44′N 9°17′E
- Country: Italy
- Region: Lombardy
- Province: Province of Pavia (PV)

Area
  - Total: 36.7 km^{2} (14.2 sq mi)

Population (Dec. 2004)
  - Total: 589
  - Density: 16.0/km^{2} (41.6/sq mi)
- Time zone: UTC+1 (CET)
  - Summer (DST): UTC+2 (CEST)
- Postal code: 27050
- Dialing code: 0383

Santa Margherita di Staffora is a comune (municipality) in the Province of Pavia in the Italian region Lombardy, located about 80 km (50 mi) south of Milan and about 50 km (31 mi) south of Pavia. As of 31 December 2004, it had a population of 589 and an area of 36.7 km^{2} (14.2 sq mi).

Santa Margherita di Staffora borders the following municipalities: Bobbio, Brallo di Pregola, Fabbrica Curone, Menconico, Varzi, Zerba.

== Demographic evolution ==
Historical population

Year	Pop.	±%
1861	1,639	—
1871	1,639	+0.0%
1881	1,697	+3.5%
1901	1,847	+8.8%
1911	1,841	−0.3%

Year	Pop.	±%
1921	1,928	+4.7%
1931	1,953	+1.3%
1936	1,912	−2.1%
1951	1,755	−8.2%
1961	1,464	−16.6%

Year	Pop.	±%
1971	1,030	−29.6%
1981	880	−14.6%
1991	761	−13.5%
2001	617	−18.9%

Source: Data from ISTAT
