= Godiasco Salice Terme =

Godiasco Salice Terme Gudiass
- Comune
- Comune di Godiasco Salice Terme
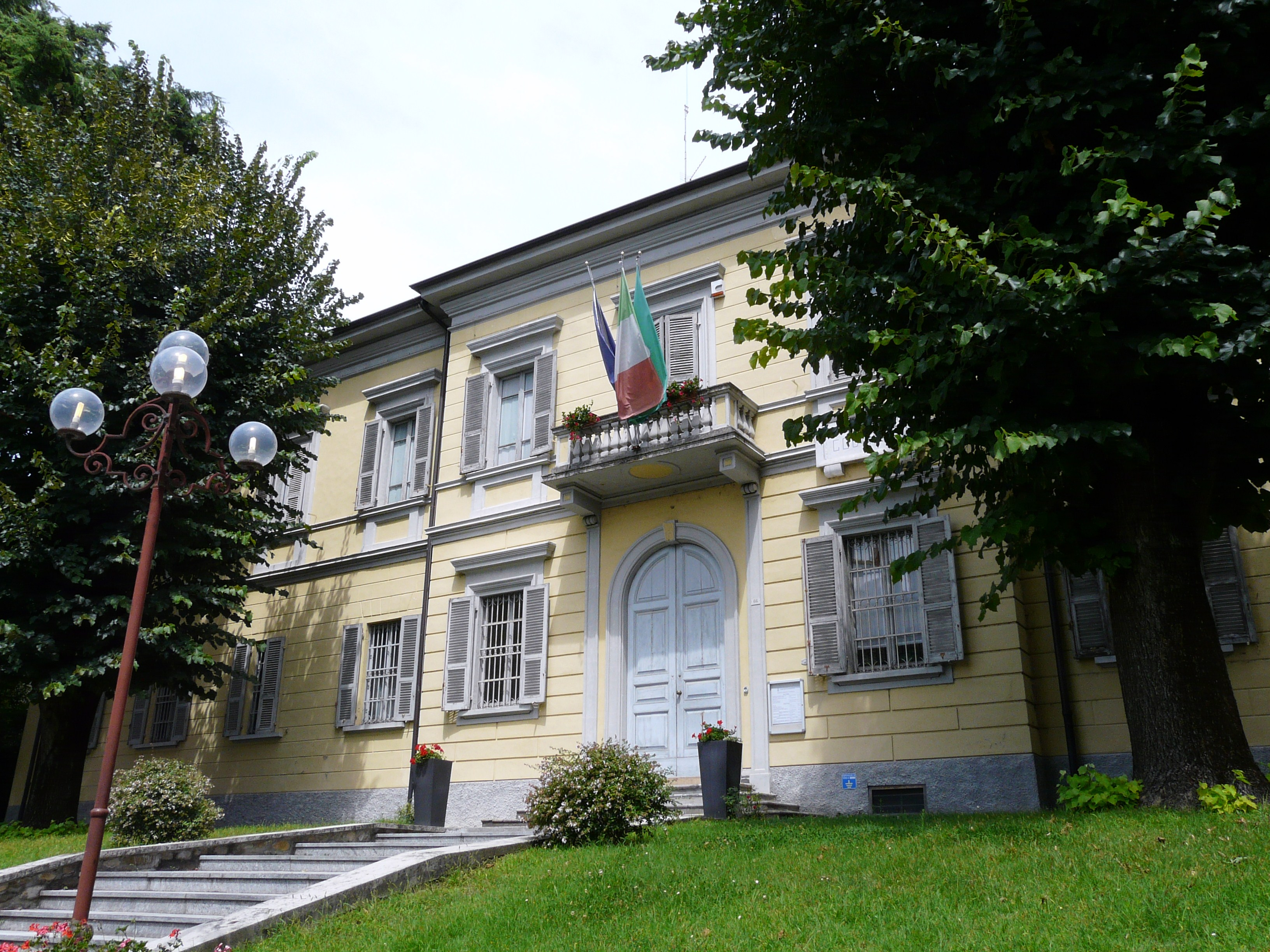
- Town Hall

- Godiasco Salice Terme within the Province of Pavia

- Location within Italy Location within Lombardy
- Coordinates: 44°54′N 9°3′E
- Country: Italy
- Region: Lombardy
- Province: Pavia (PV)
- Frazioni: Alta Collina, Casa Bedaglia, Casa Belloni, Cascina Morosini, Gomo, Montalfeo, Montegarzano, Piumesana, Sala Superiore, Salice Terme, San Bartolomeo, San Desiderio, San Giovanni, Verone

Government
  - Mayor: Fabio Riva

Area
  - Total: 20.61 km^{2} (7.96 sq mi)
- Elevation: 196 m (643 ft)

Population (31 August 2017)
  - Total: 3,251
  - Density: 157.7/km^{2} (408.5/sq mi)
- Demonym(s): Godiaschesi, Salicesi
- Time zone: UTC+1 (CET)
  - Summer (DST): UTC+2 (CEST)
- Postal code: 27052
- Dialing code: 0383
- Website: Official website

Godiasco Salice Terme (Western Lombard: Gudiass) is a comune (municipality) in the Province of Pavia in the Italian region Lombardy, located about 60 km south of Milan and about 30 km south of Pavia.

== Geography ==
The municipality of Godiasco Salice Terme contains the hamlets (frazioni) of Alta Collina, Casa Bedaglia, Casa Belloni, Cascina Morosini, Gomo, Montalfeo, Montegarzano, Piumesana, Sala Superiore, Salice Terme, San Bartolomeo, San Desiderio, San Giovanni and Verone. Salice is the most populated hamlet and a spa town.

Godiasco Salice Terme borders the following municipalities: Casalnoceto, Cecima, Montesegale, Ponte Nizza, Pozzol Groppo, Rivanazzano Terme, Rocca Susella, Volpedo.
