= Curone =

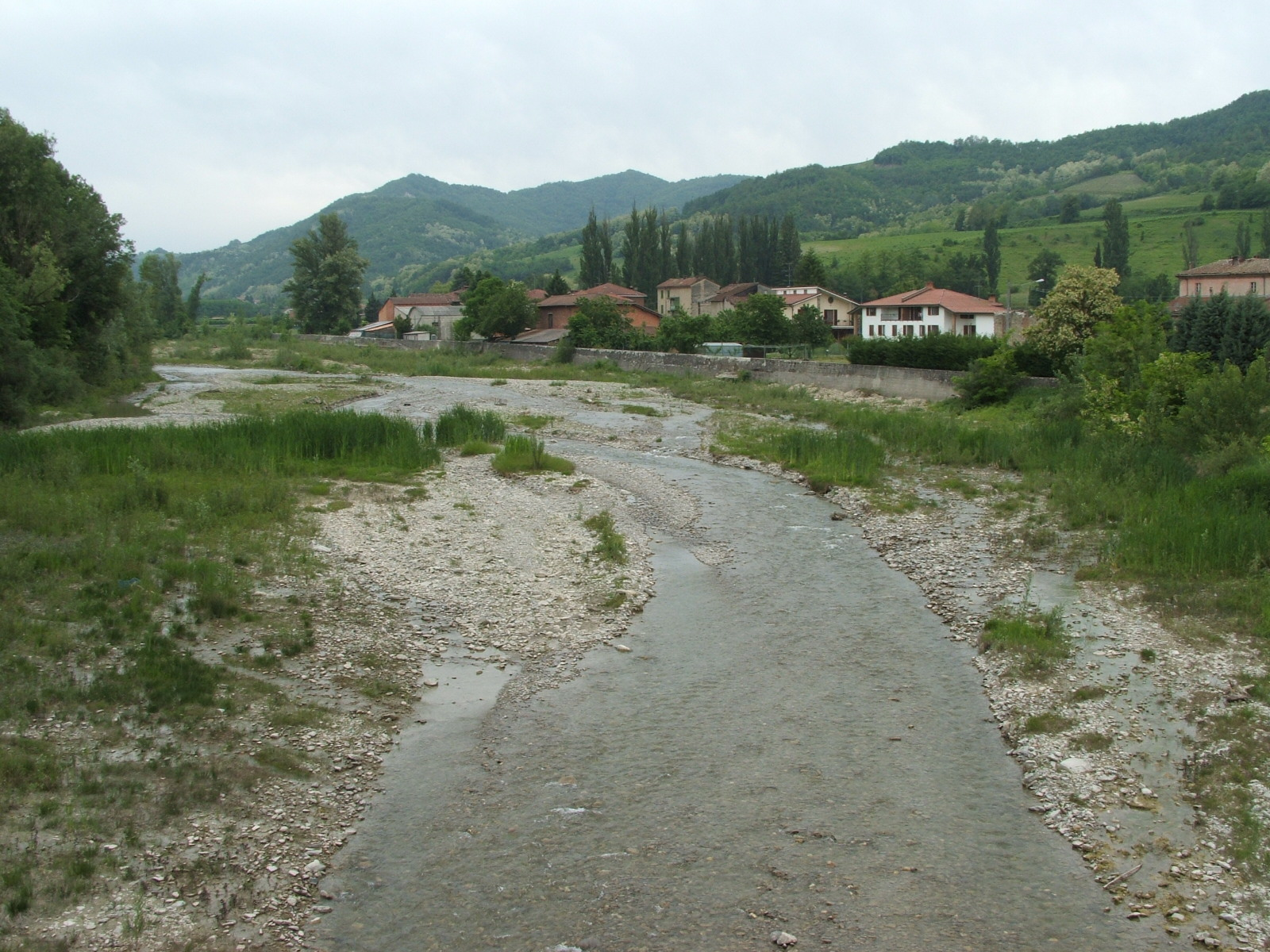
- The Curone at Brignano-Frascata in May 2006

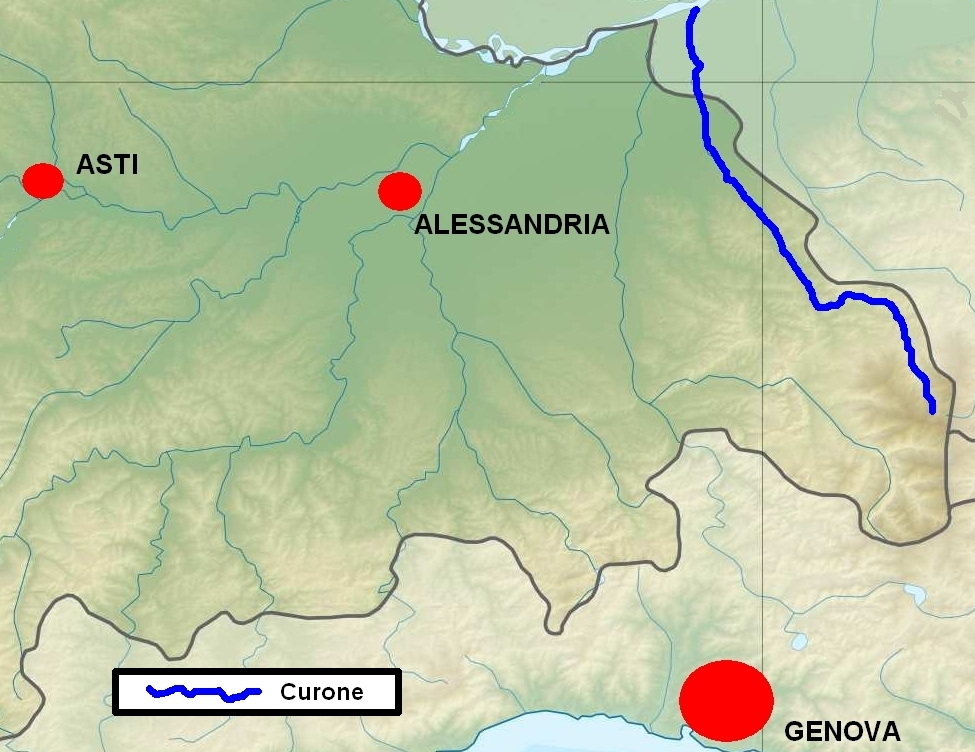
- Location of the stream

Location
- Country: Italy

Physical characteristics
- Source
  - location: Monte Garave
  - elevation: 1,500 m (4,900 ft)
- Mouth
  - location: Po near Casei Gerola
  - coordinates: 45.0656°N 8.9325°E
- Length: 59.482 km (36.960 mi)
- Discharge
  - average: 3.7 m^{3}/s (130 cu ft/s)

Basin features
- Progression: Po→ Adriatic Sea

The Curone (in Piedmontese and in Lombard Cròu) is a torrent which flows for some 50 km) through the Italian regions Lombardy and Piedmont. It is a right tributary of the river Po.

The source of the river is at an elevation of some 1,500 m on Monte Garavè and close to the border between Piedmont and Lombardy.
