= Retorbido =

- Comune
- Comune di Retorbido
- Location within Italy Location within Lombardy
- Coordinates: 44°57′N 9°2′E
- Country: Italy
- Region: Lombardy
- Province: Province of Pavia (PV)

Area
  - Total: 11.7 km^{2} (4.5 sq mi)

Population (Dec. 2004)
  - Total: 1,242
  - Density: 106/km^{2} (275/sq mi)
- Time zone: UTC+1 (CET)
  - Summer (DST): UTC+2 (CEST)
- Postal code: 27050
- Dialing code: 0383

Retorbido (Lombard: Al Turbi) is a comune (municipality) in the Province of Pavia in the Italian region Lombardy, located about 60 km (37 mi) south of Milan and about 30 km (19 mi) southwest of Pavia. As of 31 December 2004, it had a population of 1,242 and an area of 11.7 km^{2} (4.5 sq mi).

Retorbido borders the following municipalities: Codevilla, Rivanazzano Terme, Rocca Susella, Torrazza Coste, Voghera.

== Demographic evolution ==
Historical population

Year	Pop.	±%
1861	1,203	—
1871	1,263	+5.0%
1881	1,467	+16.2%
1901	2,017	+37.5%
1911	2,060	+2.1%

Year	Pop.	±%
1921	2,013	−2.3%
1931	2,050	+1.8%
1936	1,795	−12.4%
1951	1,732	−3.5%
1961	1,496	−13.6%

Year	Pop.	±%
1971	1,287	−14.0%
1981	1,188	−7.7%
1991	1,078	−9.3%
2001	1,170	+8.5%

Source: Data from ISTAT
