= Varzi =

- Comune
- Comune di Varzi
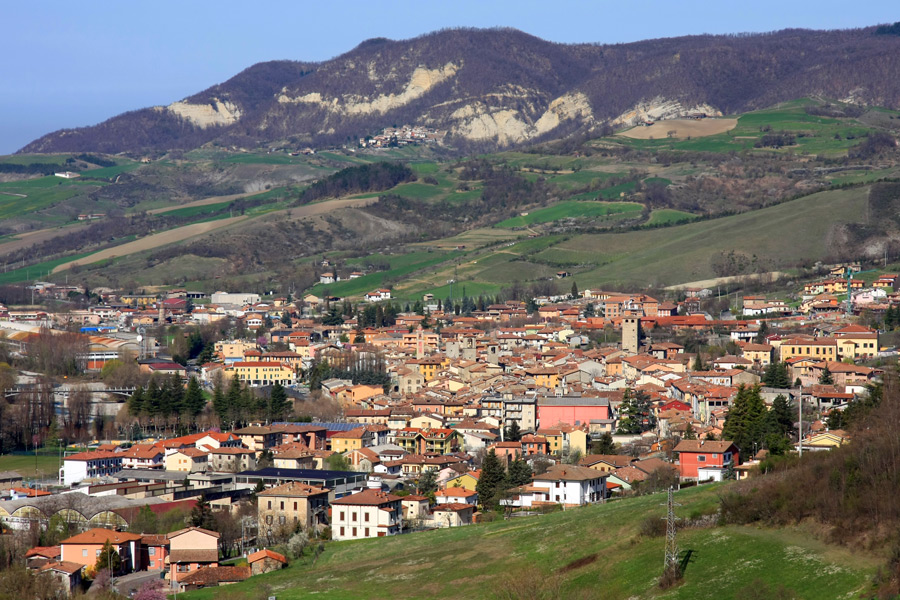

- Location within Italy Location within Lombardy
- Coordinates: 44°49′N 9°12′E
- Country: Italy
- Region: Lombardy
- Province: Pavia (PV)
- Frazioni: Bognassi, Bosmenso, Casa Bertella, Castellaro, Cella, Monteforte, Nivione, Pietragavina, Rosara, Sagliano, Santa Cristina

Government
  - Mayor: Gianfranco Alberti

Area
  - Total: 57.61 km^{2} (22.24 sq mi)
- Elevation: 426 m (1,398 ft)

Population (1 January 2013)
  - Total: 3,383
  - Density: 58.72/km^{2} (152.1/sq mi)
- Demonym: Varzesi
- Time zone: UTC+1 (CET)
  - Summer (DST): UTC+2 (CEST)
- Postal code: 27057
- Dialing code: 0383
- Website: Official website

Varzi is a comune (municipality) in the Province of Pavia in the Italian region Lombardy, located about 70 km south of Milan and about 40 km south of Pavia. It is one of I Borghi più belli d'Italia ("The most beautiful villages of Italy").

Varzi borders the following municipalities: Bagnaria, Fabbrica Curone, Gremiasco, Menconico, Ponte Nizza, Romagnese, Santa Margherita di Staffora, Val di Nizza, Valverde, Zavattarello.

== Main sights ==
Among the religious buildings in town are:

- Chiesa dei Cappuccini.
- Chiesa dei Rossi.
- Tempio della Fraternità di Cella.
