= Ponte Nizza =

- Comune
- Comune di Ponte Nizza
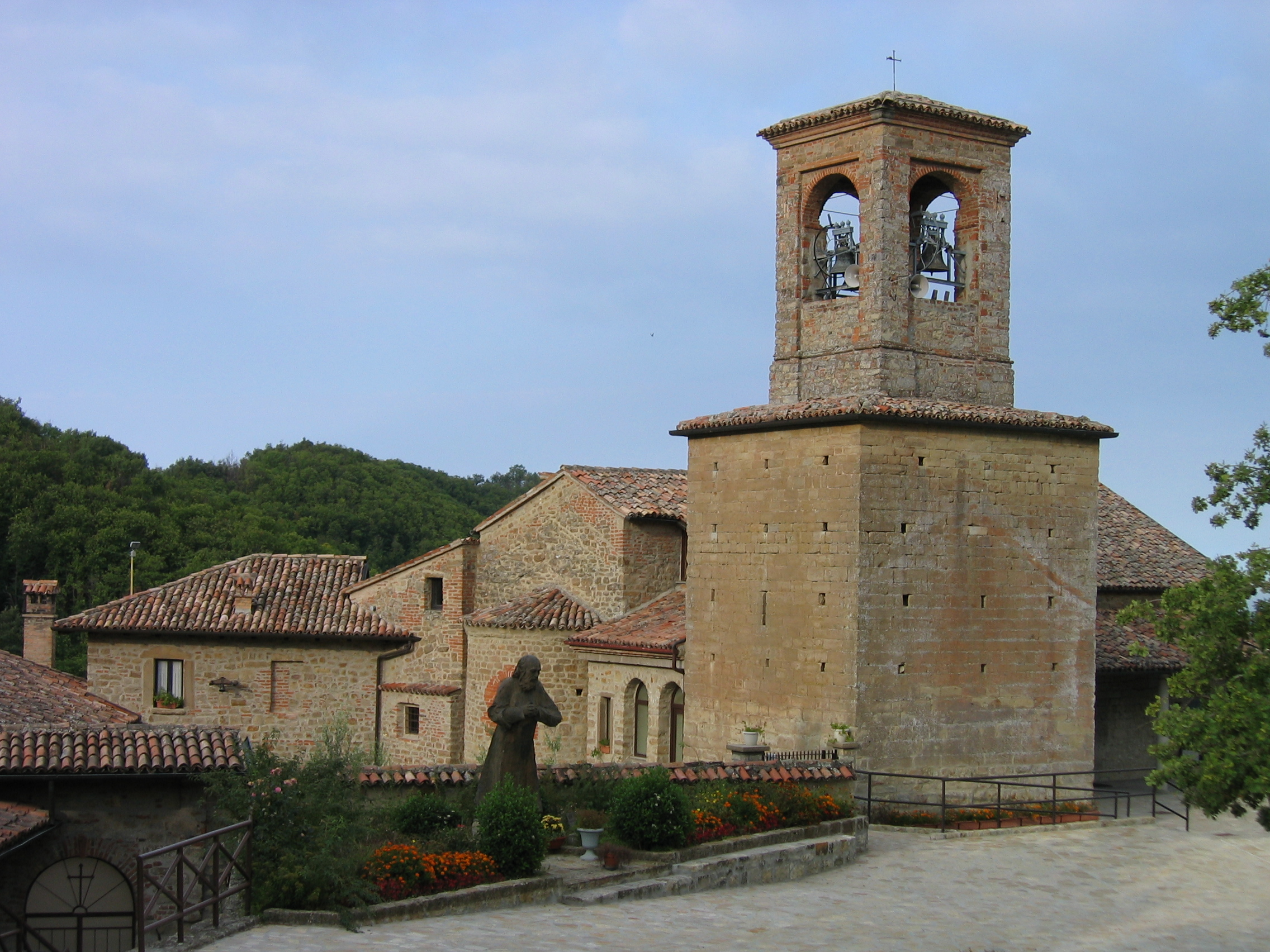
- Hermitage of Butrio.

- Location within Italy Location within Lombardy
- Coordinates: 44°51′N 9°6′E
- Country: Italy
- Region: Lombardy
- Province: Pavia (PV)

Government
  - Mayor: Celestino Pernigotti

Area
  - Total: 23.1 km^{2} (8.9 sq mi)

Population (31 December 2010)
  - Total: 822
  - Density: 35.6/km^{2} (92.2/sq mi)
- Demonym: Pontenizzesi
- Time zone: UTC+1 (CET)
  - Summer (DST): UTC+2 (CEST)
- Postal code: 27050
- Dialing code: 0383
- Website: Official website

Ponte Nizza is a comune (municipality) in the Province of Pavia in the Italian region Lombardy, located about 70 km south of Milan and about 35 km south of Pavia.

Ponte Nizza borders the following municipalities: Bagnaria, Cecima, Godiasco, Gremiasco, Montesegale, Val di Nizza, Varzi.
