= Brignano-Frascata =

- Comune
- Comune di Brignano-Frascata
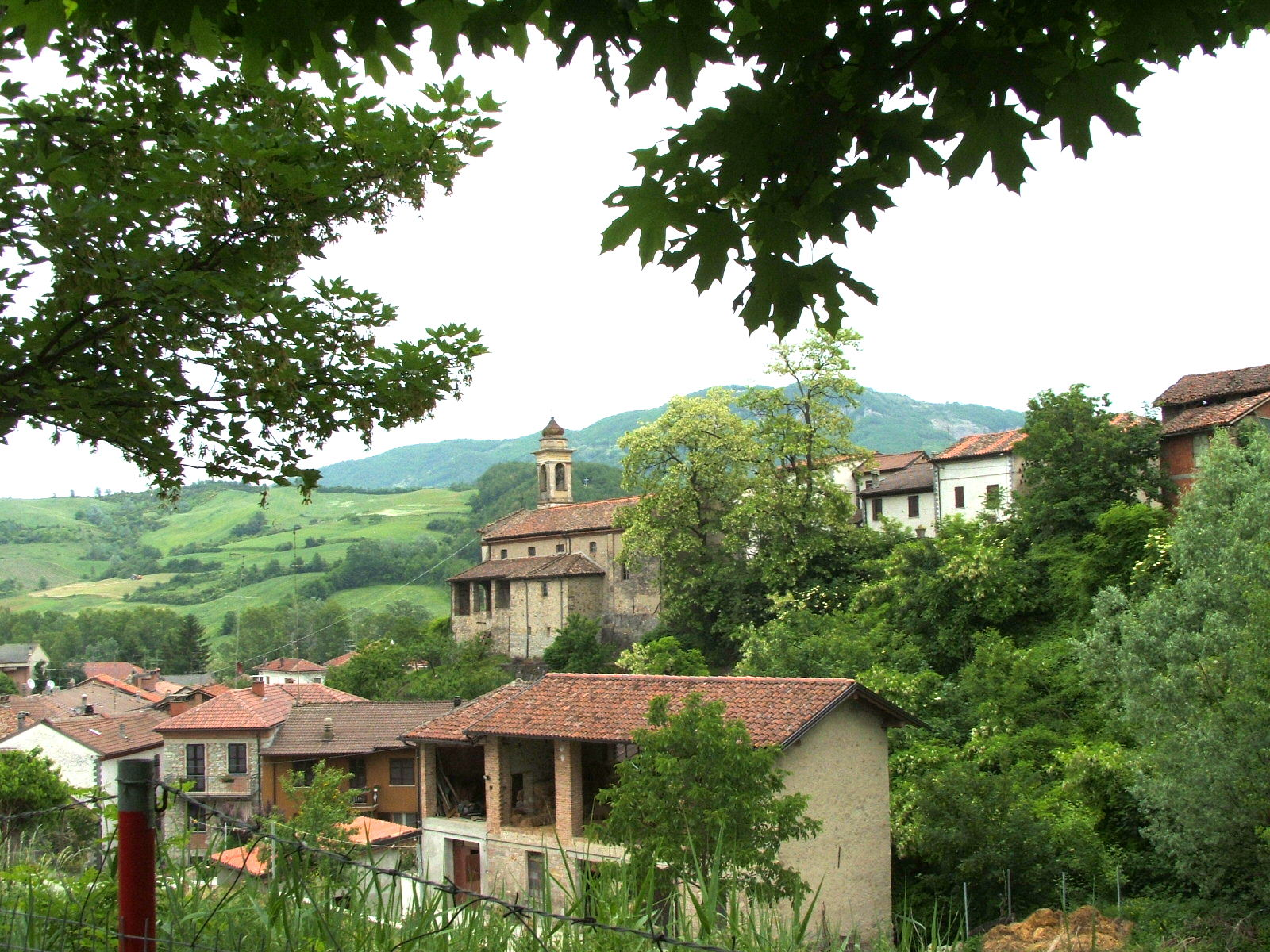

- Coat of arms

- Location within Italy Location within Piedmont
- Coordinates: 44°49′N 9°2′E
- Country: Italy
- Region: Piedmont
- Province: Alessandria (AL)

Government
  - Mayor: Alessandro Davico

Area
  - Total: 17.53 km^{2} (6.77 sq mi)
- Elevation: 288 m (945 ft)

Population (30 November 2019)
  - Total: 425
  - Density: 24.2/km^{2} (62.8/sq mi)
- Demonym: Brignanesi
- Time zone: UTC+1 (CET)
  - Summer (DST): UTC+2 (CEST)
- Postal code: 15050
- Dialing code: 0131
- Website: Official website

Brignano-Frascata is a comune (municipality) in the Province of Alessandria in the Italian region Piedmont, located about 110 kilometres (68 mi) east of Turin and about 35 kilometres (22 mi) southeast of Alessandria.

== History ==
Discoveries in Serra del Monte indicate the area was frequented in the Neolithic period. After the Lombard period, the municipal territory of Brignano-Frascata was under the control of Bobbio Abbey, which added it to the monastic court of Casasco.

Later, during the High Middle Ages, the area was under the jurisdiction of the bishops of Tortona from 1157. In 1375, it became a fief of the Duke of Milan, granted to the Genoese Spinola family.

On the morning of June 1, 1478, Napoleone and Giovanni Antonio Spinola attacked their brother Battista and his family in the castle of Brignano. Battista and his three sons were killed in the attack, and one of his daughters died shortly after from her injuries. As a result of the confiscation of the assassins' assets, the fief passed to Battista's son-in-law Enrico Bigurra, who sold it in 1485 to Cavalchino Guidobono for 13,500 imperial lira.

From 1685 to around 1800 the area belonged to the Ferrari of San Sebastiano. It became a comune in 1928 following the merger of the comuni of Brignano del Curone and Frascata. Until 1947, the comune also included the territory of the comune of Momperone.
