= Cergnago =

- Comune
- Comune di Cergnago
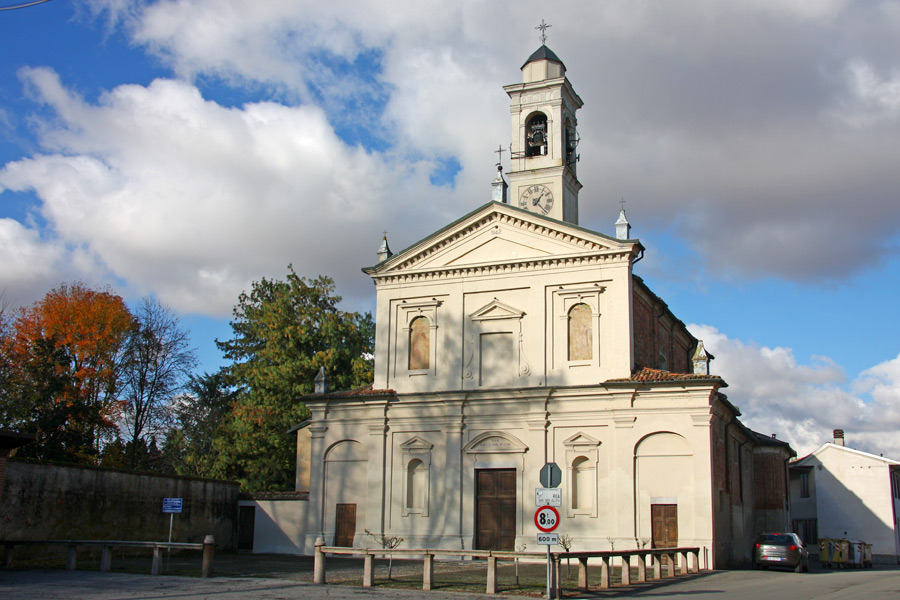

- Location within Italy Location within Lombardy
- Coordinates: 45°12′N 8°46′E
- Country: Italy
- Region: Lombardy
- Province: Pavia (PV)
- Frazioni: Abbazia Erbamara

Government
  - Mayor: Marco Bagnoli

Area
  - Total: 13.6 km^{2} (5.3 sq mi)
- Elevation: 100 m (330 ft)

Population (Dec. 2004)
  - Total: 769
  - Density: 56.5/km^{2} (146/sq mi)
- Demonym: Cergnaghesi (Lombard: sargnaghin)
- Time zone: UTC+1 (CET)
  - Summer (DST): UTC+2 (CEST)
- Postal code: 27020
- Dialing code: 0384
- Patron saint: St. Helena
- Saint day: August 18

Cergnago is a comune (municipality) in the Province of Pavia in the Italian region Lombardy, located about 45 km (28 mi) southwest of Milan and about 30 km (19 mi) west of Pavia. As of 1 January 2018, it had a population of 719 and an area of 13.6 km^{2} (5.3 sq mi).

Cergnago borders the following municipalities: Mortara, Olevano di Lomellina, San Giorgio di Lomellina, Tromello, Velezzo Lomellina.

== Demographic evolution ==
Historical population

Year	Pop.	±%
1861	1,228	—
1871	1,320	+7.5%
1881	1,537	+16.4%
1901	1,540	+0.2%
1911	1,648	+7.0%

Year	Pop.	±%
1921	1,696	+2.9%
1931	1,397	−17.6%
1936	1,319	−5.6%
1951	1,348	+2.2%
1961	1,229	−8.8%

Year	Pop.	±%
1971	923	−24.9%
1981	749	−18.9%
1991	730	−2.5%
2001	764	+4.7%

Source: Data from ISTAT
