= Velezzo Lomellina =

- Comune
- Comune di Velezzo Lomellina
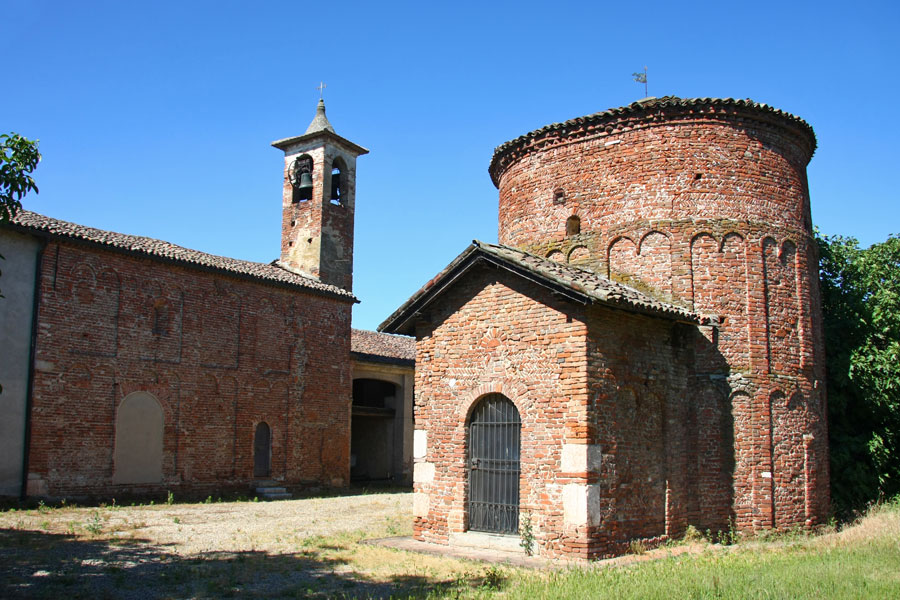

- Location within Italy Location within Lombardy
- Coordinates: 45°10′N 8°44′E
- Country: Italy
- Region: Lombardy
- Province: Province of Pavia (PV)
- Frazioni: Campalestro

Area
  - Total: 8.6 km^{2} (3.3 sq mi)
- Elevation: 98 m (322 ft)

Population (Dec. 2004)
  - Total: 113
  - Density: 13/km^{2} (34/sq mi)
- Demonym: Velezzini
- Time zone: UTC+1 (CET)
  - Summer (DST): UTC+2 (CEST)
- Postal code: 22020
- Dialing code: 0384

Velezzo Lomellina is a comune (municipality) in the Province of Pavia in the Italian region Lombardy, located about 50 km (31 mi) southwest of Milan and about 35 km (22 mi) west of Pavia. As of 31 December 2004, it had a population of 113 and an area of 8.6 km^{2} (3.3 sq mi).

The municipality of Velezzo Lomellina contains the frazione (subdivision) Campalestro.

Velezzo Lomellina borders the following municipalities: Cergnago, Lomello, Olevano di Lomellina, San Giorgio di Lomellina, Semiana, Valle Lomellina, Zeme.

== Demographic evolution ==
Historical population

Year	Pop.	±%
1861	742	—
1871	776	+4.6%
1881	763	−1.7%
1901	809	+6.0%
1911	661	−18.3%

Year	Pop.	±%
1921	673	+1.8%
1931	488	−27.5%
1936	521	+6.8%
1951	609	+16.9%
1961	419	−31.2%

Year	Pop.	±%
1971	143	−65.9%
1981	132	−7.7%
1991	122	−7.6%
2001	103	−15.6%

Source: Data from ISTAT
