= Olevano =

Olevano may refer to several places:

- Olevano di Lomellina, Italian municipality of the province of Pavia
- Olevano Romano, Italian municipality of the province of Roma
- Olevano sul Tusciano, Italian municipality of the province of Salerno
