= Valle Lomellina =

- Comune
- Comune di Valle Lomellina
- Location within Italy Location within Lombardy
- Coordinates: 45°9′N 8°40′E
- Country: Italy
- Region: Lombardy
- Province: Province of Pavia (PV)
- Frazioni: Bordignana, Cascina d'Allona, Cascina dei Risi

Area
  - Total: 27.1 km^{2} (10.5 sq mi)
- Elevation: 101 m (331 ft)

Population (Dec. 2004)
  - Total: 2,224
  - Density: 82.1/km^{2} (213/sq mi)
- Demonym: Vallesi
- Time zone: UTC+1 (CET)
  - Summer (DST): UTC+2 (CEST)
- Postal code: 27020
- Dialing code: 0384
- Website: Official website

Valle Lomellina (pronounced [ˈvalle lomelˈlina]) is a comune (municipality) in the Province of Pavia in the Italian region Lombardy, located about 50 km (31 mi) southwest of Milan and about 40 km (25 mi) west of Pavia. As of 31 December 2004, it had a population of 2,224 and an area of 27.1 km^{2} (10.5 sq mi).

The municipality of Valle Lomellina contains the frazioni (subdivisions, mainly villages and hamlets) Bordignana, Cascina d'Allona, and Cascina dei Risi.

Valle Lomellina borders the following municipalities: Breme, Candia Lomellina, Cozzo, Sartirana Lomellina, Semiana, Velezzo Lomellina, Zeme.

== Demographic evolution ==
Historical population

Year	Pop.	±%
1861	3,039	—
1871	3,464	+14.0%
1881	3,939	+13.7%
1901	4,200	+6.6%
1911	4,129	−1.7%

Year	Pop.	±%
1921	3,603	−12.7%
1931	3,325	−7.7%
1936	3,396	+2.1%
1951	3,362	−1.0%
1961	3,065	−8.8%

Year	Pop.	±%
1971	2,568	−16.2%
1981	2,472	−3.7%
1991	2,284	−7.6%
2001	2,229	−2.4%

Source: Data from ISTAT

== Twin towns ==
Valle Lomellina is twinned with:

- Fourques, Gard, France, since 1998
