= Frascarolo =

- Comune
- Comune di Frascarolo
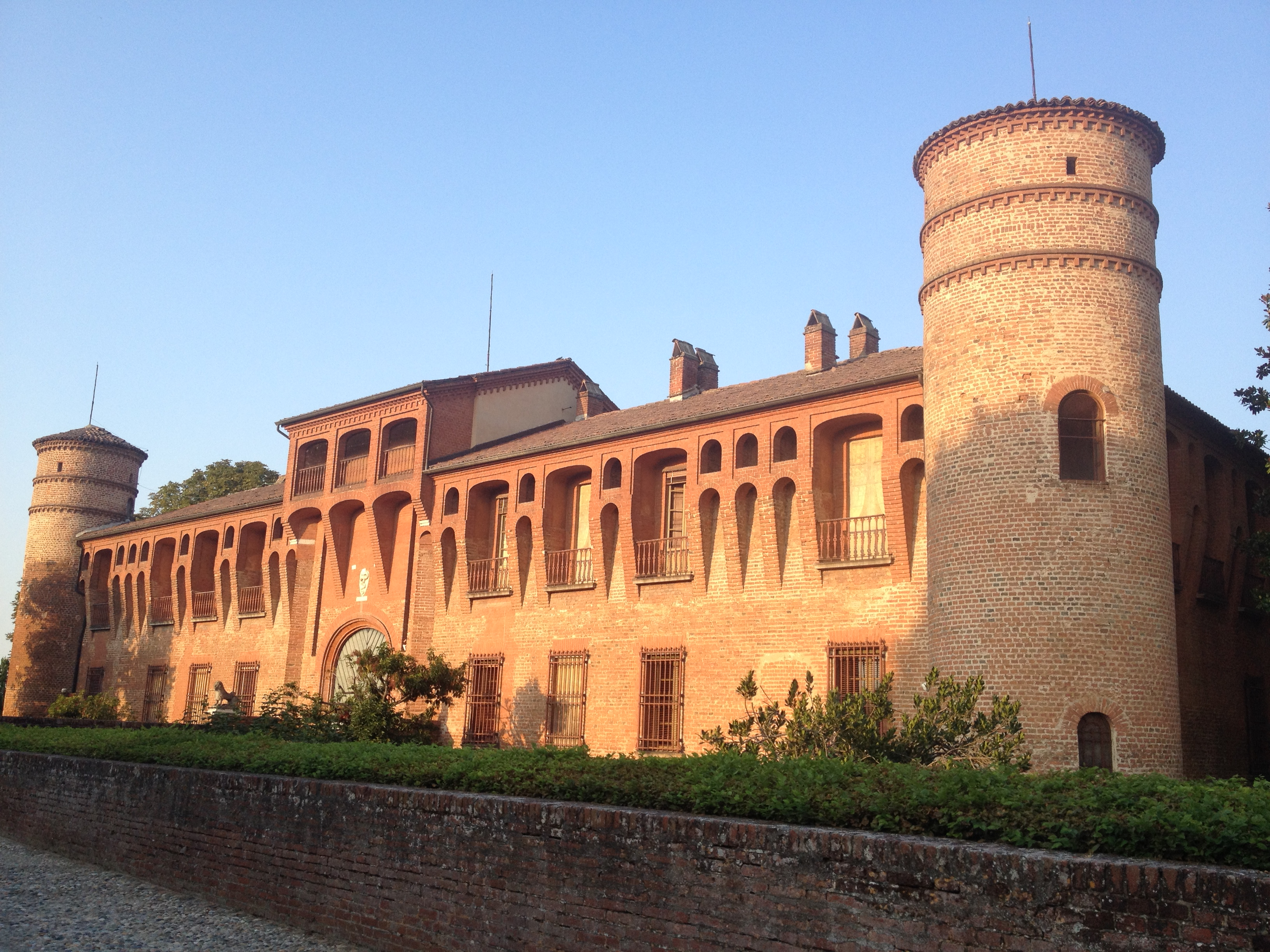

- Location within Italy Location within Lombardy
- Coordinates: 45°3′N 8°41′E
- Country: Italy
- Region: Lombardy
- Province: Province of Pavia (PV)

Area
  - Total: 23.4 km^{2} (9.0 sq mi)

Population (Dec. 2004)
  - Total: 1,277
  - Density: 54.6/km^{2} (141/sq mi)
- Time zone: UTC+1 (CET)
  - Summer (DST): UTC+2 (CEST)
- Postal code: 27030
- Dialing code: 0384

Frascarolo is a comune (municipality) in the Province of Pavia in the Italian region Lombardy, located about 60 km (37 mi) southwest of Milan and about 40 km (25 mi) southwest of Pavia. As of 31 December 2004, it had a population of 1,277 and an area of 23.4 km^{2} (9.0 sq mi).

Frascarolo borders the following municipalities: Bassignana, Gambarana, Mede, Suardi, Torre Beretti e Castellaro, Valenza.

== Demographic evolution ==
Historical population

Year	Pop.	±%
1861	2,081	—
1871	2,243	+7.8%
1881	2,437	+8.6%
1901	2,312	−5.1%
1911	2,108	−8.8%

Year	Pop.	±%
1921	1,835	−13.0%
1931	1,779	−3.1%
1936	1,722	−3.2%
1951	1,727	+0.3%
1961	1,641	−5.0%

Year	Pop.	±%
1971	1,423	−13.3%
1981	1,335	−6.2%
1991	1,329	−0.4%
2001	1,321	−0.6%

Source: Data from ISTAT
