= Tromello =

- Comune
- Comune di Tromello
- Location within Italy Location within Lombardy
- Coordinates: 45°13′N 8°52′E
- Country: Italy
- Region: Lombardy
- Province: Province of Pavia (PV)

Area
  - Total: 35.2 km^{2} (13.6 sq mi)
- Elevation: 97 m (318 ft)

Population (Dec. 2004)
  - Total: 3,561
  - Density: 101/km^{2} (262/sq mi)
- Time zone: UTC+1 (CET)
  - Summer (DST): UTC+2 (CEST)
- Postal code: 27020
- Dialing code: 0382

Tromello is a comune (municipality) in the Province of Pavia in the Italian region Lombardy, located about 35 km (22 mi) southwest of Milan and about 25 km (16 mi) west of Pavia. As of 31 December 2004, it had a population of 3,561 and an area of 35.2 km^{2} (13.6 sq mi).

Tromello borders the following municipalities: Alagna, Borgo San Siro, Cergnago, Gambolò, Garlasco, Mortara, Ottobiano, San Giorgio di Lomellina, Valeggio.

On May 27, 2019, Tromello became the first Italian comune to elect a transgender mayor, Gianmarco Negri.

== Demographic evolution ==
Historical population

Year	Pop.	±%
1861	3,501	—
1871	3,909	+11.7%
1881	4,416	+13.0%
1901	4,512	+2.2%
1911	4,514	+0.0%

Year	Pop.	±%
1921	4,098	−9.2%
1931	3,892	−5.0%
1936	3,912	+0.5%
1951	3,861	−1.3%
1961	3,636	−5.8%

Year	Pop.	±%
1971	3,271	−10.0%
1981	3,040	−7.1%
1991	3,123	+2.7%
2001	3,409	+9.2%

Source: Data from ISTAT
