= San Giorgio di Lomellina =

- Comune
- Comune di San Giorgio di Lomellina
- Coat of arms

- Location within Italy Location within Lombardy
- Coordinates: 45°12′N 8°46′E
- Country: Italy
- Region: Lombardy
- Province: Pavia (PV)

Government
  - Mayor: Gian Pietro Savino

Area
  - Total: 25.9 km^{2} (10.0 sq mi)

Population (Dec. 2004)
  - Total: 1,196
  - Density: 46.2/km^{2} (120/sq mi)
- Time zone: UTC+1 (CET)
  - Summer (DST): UTC+2 (CEST)
- Postal code: 27020
- Dialing code: 0384

San Giorgio di Lomellina is a comune (municipality) in the Province of Pavia in the Italian region Lombardy, located about 45 km (28 mi) southwest of Milan and about 30 km (19 mi) west of Pavia. As of 31 December 2004, it had a population of 1,196 and an area of 25.9 km^{2} (10.0 sq mi).

San Giorgio di Lomellina borders the following municipalities: Cergnago, Lomello, Ottobiano, Tromello, Velezzo Lomellina.

== Demographic evolution ==
Historical population

Year	Pop.	±%
1861	2,576	—
1871	2,910	+13.0%
1881	3,410	+17.2%
1901	3,285	−3.7%
1911	3,262	−0.7%

Year	Pop.	±%
1921	2,948	−9.6%
1931	2,590	−12.1%
1936	2,579	−0.4%
1951	2,565	−0.5%
1961	2,226	−13.2%

Year	Pop.	±%
1971	1,718	−22.8%
1981	1,482	−13.7%
1991	1,272	−14.2%
2001	1,202	−5.5%

Source: Data from ISTAT
