= Lomello =

- Comune
- Comune di Lomello
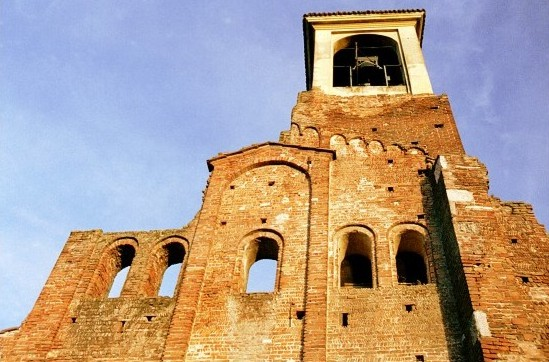
- The ruins of the Basilica of Santa Maria Maggiore

- Coat of arms

- Location within Italy Location within Lombardy
- Coordinates: 45°7′N 8°48′E
- Country: Italy
- Region: Lombardy
- Province: Pavia (PV)

Government
  - Mayor: Giuseppe Piovera

Area
  - Total: 22.2 km^{2} (8.6 sq mi)
- Elevation: 99 m (325 ft)

Population (31 December 2004)
  - Total: 2,430
  - Density: 109/km^{2} (283/sq mi)
- Demonym: Lomellesi
- Time zone: UTC+1 (CET)
  - Summer (DST): UTC+2 (CEST)
- Postal code: 27034
- Dialing code: 0384

Lomello is a comune (municipality) in the Province of Pavia in the Italian region Lombardy, located about 50 km (31 mi) southwest of Milan and about 30 km (19 mi) west of Pavia, on the right bank of the Agogna. It gives its name to the surrounding area, the Lomellina. Lomello borders the following municipalities: Ferrera Erbognone, Galliavola, Mede, Ottobiano, San Giorgio di Lomellina, Semiana, Velezzo Lomellina, Villa Biscossi.

== History ==
Laumellum was a Roman mansio (a stopping place on a road) on the way of Via Regina, the main road connecting Ticinum (now Pavia) with Turin along the way of the Galliae. The archeological excavations made by the Universities of Pavia and of London during the latest years, brought to light inscriptions, cemeteries of the Imperial period, as well as ruins of fortifications and an entrance door in the boundary wall. Laumellum was perhaps a pre-Roman center of the Ligures.

During the Lombard domination (569-774), Lomello began to know a considerable prosperity. This was the place where Queen Theodolinda, widow of Authari, married Agilulf, Duke of Turin, in 590. Queen Gundeberga, daughter of Theodolinda and wife of Arioald, after being charged with the betrayal of her husband, was imprisoned in a tower in 629 and released after three years, thanks to the first "Judgement of God" ever celebrated in Italy.

In the Carolingian period, it was the place of a comitatus and in 1024 the fortress of Lomello was elected to the residence of the Palatine Counts while, in the same years, the basilica of Santa Maria Maggiore was built as a mark of wealth and power. The commune of Pavia defeated the Counts in the 1140s and captured Lomello, owning it until 1360, when Lomello came under the domination of the Visconti, who were followed, from 1450 to 1535, by the Sforza. Francesco Sforza assigned the County of Lomello to the Crivelli family, who held it continuously until 1760.

== Main sights ==
- Remains of the medieval walls
- First Romanesque Basilica of Santa Maria Maggiore (known from the 11th century).
- Baptistery of San Giovanni ad fontes (5th-7th century), one of the few examples of Lombard architecture in northern Italy.
- Romanesque church of San Michele (12th century), in Romanesque style with the exception of the Baroque façade.
- The Castle (15th century). Situated on a hillock in the middle of the village, its origin dates back to the 11th century, when the Palatine Counts extended their domain over the whole region. Almost entirely re-built by Antonio Crivelli from 1450 on, it was completed by his successors and particularly by Alessandro who, after the death of his wife, took up the ecclesiastical career, becoming a Cardinal in 1565. He was the commissioner of the frescoes in the internal halls, which represent the Winds and the Zodiac in the vault, the monthly labours in the lunette. In the second hall are the Paradise of Dante and some episodes from S. Catherine's life. The entrance tower with the hints of the draw-bridge and of the ditch date to the Sforza period. The castle is home to the town hall. On its first floor in the halls of the Civic Library are the remains of a mosaic once belonging to a Roman villa, representing geometrical decorations, magical symbols and the head of a Gorgon.

== Demographic evolution ==
Historical population

Year	Pop.	±%
1861	2,635	—
1871	2,947	+11.8%
1881	3,299	+11.9%
1901	3,317	+0.5%
1911	3,268	−1.5%

Year	Pop.	±%
1921	3,113	−4.7%
1931	2,881	−7.5%
1936	3,006	+4.3%
1951	3,110	+3.5%
1961	2,864	−7.9%

Year	Pop.	±%
1971	2,677	−6.5%
1981	2,556	−4.5%
1991	2,392	−6.4%
2001	2,378	−0.6%

Source: Data from ISTAT
