= Ferrera Erbognone =

- Comune
- Comune di Ferrera Erbognone
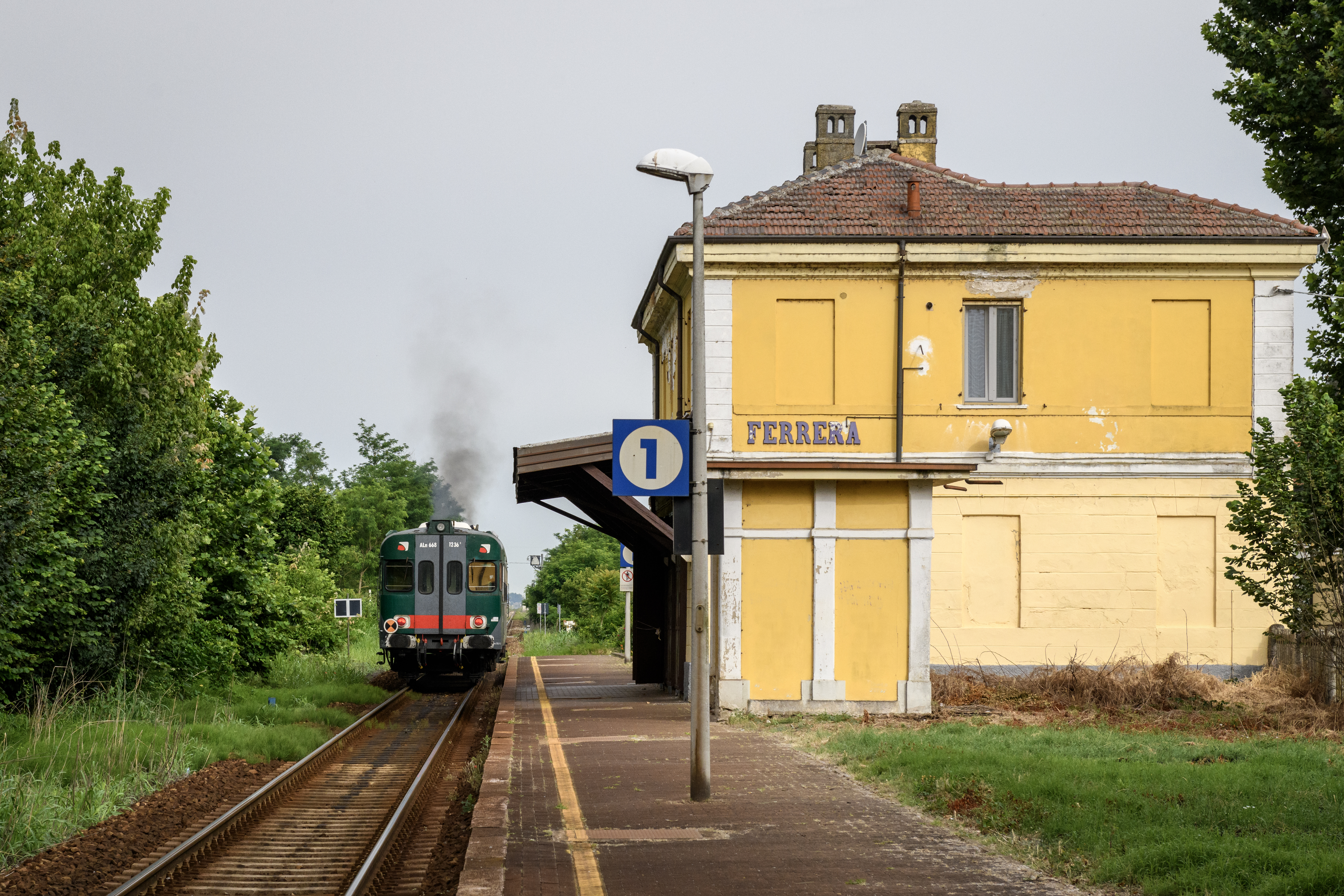

- Coat of arms

- Location within Italy Location within Lombardy
- Coordinates: 45°7′N 8°52′E
- Country: Italy
- Region: Lombardy
- Province: Pavia (PV)
- Frazioni: Confalonera

Government
  - Mayor: Riccardo Freddi

Area
  - Total: 19 km^{2} (7.3 sq mi)
- Elevation: 89 m (292 ft)

Population (30 April 2010)
  - Total: 1,088 31−08−2,024
  - Density: 57/km^{2} (150/sq mi)
- Demonym: Ferrarini
- Time zone: UTC+1 (CET)
  - Summer (DST): UTC+2 (CEST)
- Postal code: 27032
- Dialing code: 0382
- Website: Official website

Ferrera Erbognone is a comune (municipality) in the Province of Pavia in the Italian region Lombardy, located about 45 km southwest of Milan and about 25 km southwest of Pavia. It is included in the lower Lomellina historical region, on the banks of the Erbognone stream, an affluent of the Agogna.

Ferrera Erbognone borders the following municipalities: Galliavola, Lomello, Mezzana Bigli, Ottobiano, Pieve del Cairo, Sannazzaro de' Burgondi, Scaldasole, Valeggio.
