= Galliavola =

- Comune
- Comune di Galliavola
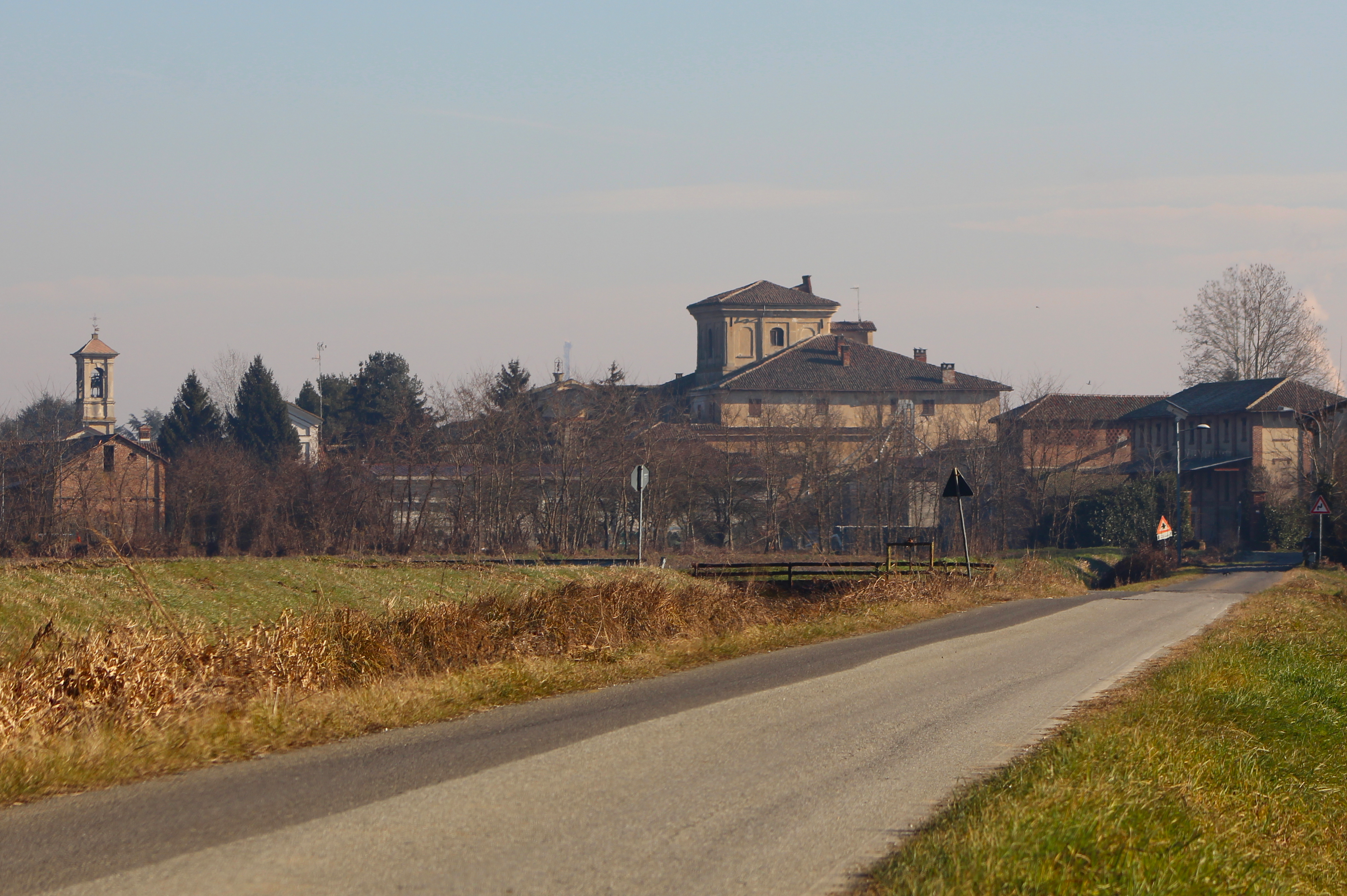

- Location within Italy Location within Lombardy
- Coordinates: 45°6′N 8°49′E
- Country: Italy
- Region: Lombardy
- Province: Province of Pavia (PV)

Area
  - Total: 8.5 km^{2} (3.3 sq mi)

Population (Dec. 2004)
  - Total: 230
  - Density: 27/km^{2} (70/sq mi)
- Time zone: UTC+1 (CET)
  - Summer (DST): UTC+2 (CEST)
- Postal code: 27034
- Dialing code: 0384

Galliavola is a comune (municipality) in the Province of Pavia in the Italian region Lombardy, located about 50 km (31 mi) southwest of Milan and about 30 km (19 mi) southwest of Pavia. As of 31 December 2004, it had a population of 230 and an area of 8.5 km^{2} (3.3 sq mi).

Galliavola borders the following municipalities: Ferrera Erbognone, Lomello, Pieve del Cairo, Villa Biscossi.

== Demographic evolution ==
Historical population

Year	Pop.	±%
1861	763	—
1871	900	+18.0%
1881	901	+0.1%
1901	924	+2.6%
1911	900	−2.6%

Year	Pop.	±%
1921	750	−16.7%
1931	641	−14.5%
1936	596	−7.0%
1951	657	+10.2%
1961	526	−19.9%

Year	Pop.	±%
1971	327	−37.8%
1981	232	−29.1%
1991	204	−12.1%
2001	232	+13.7%

Source: Data from ISTAT

== Gallery ==
Images of Galliavola

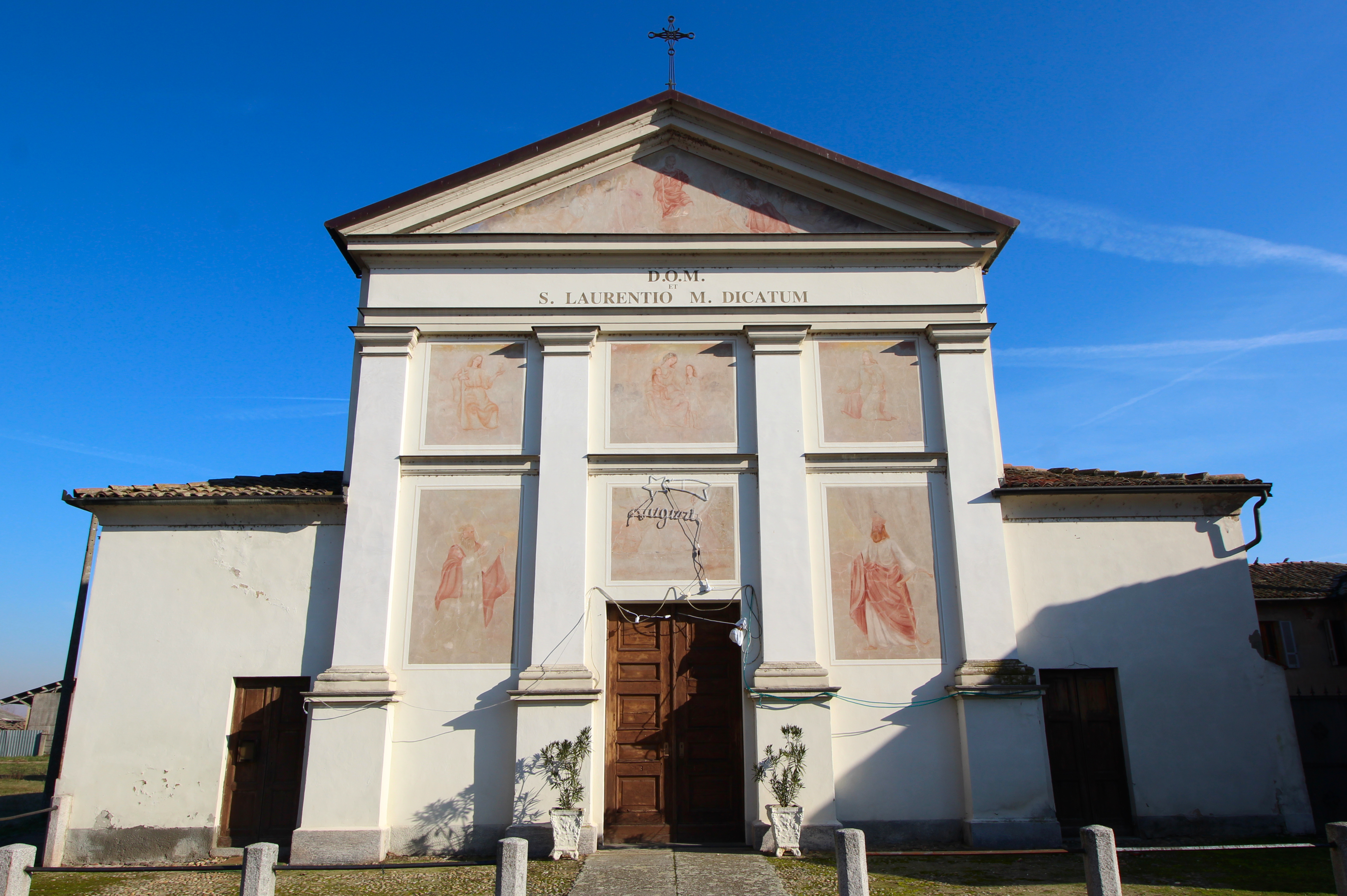
Church San Lorenzo

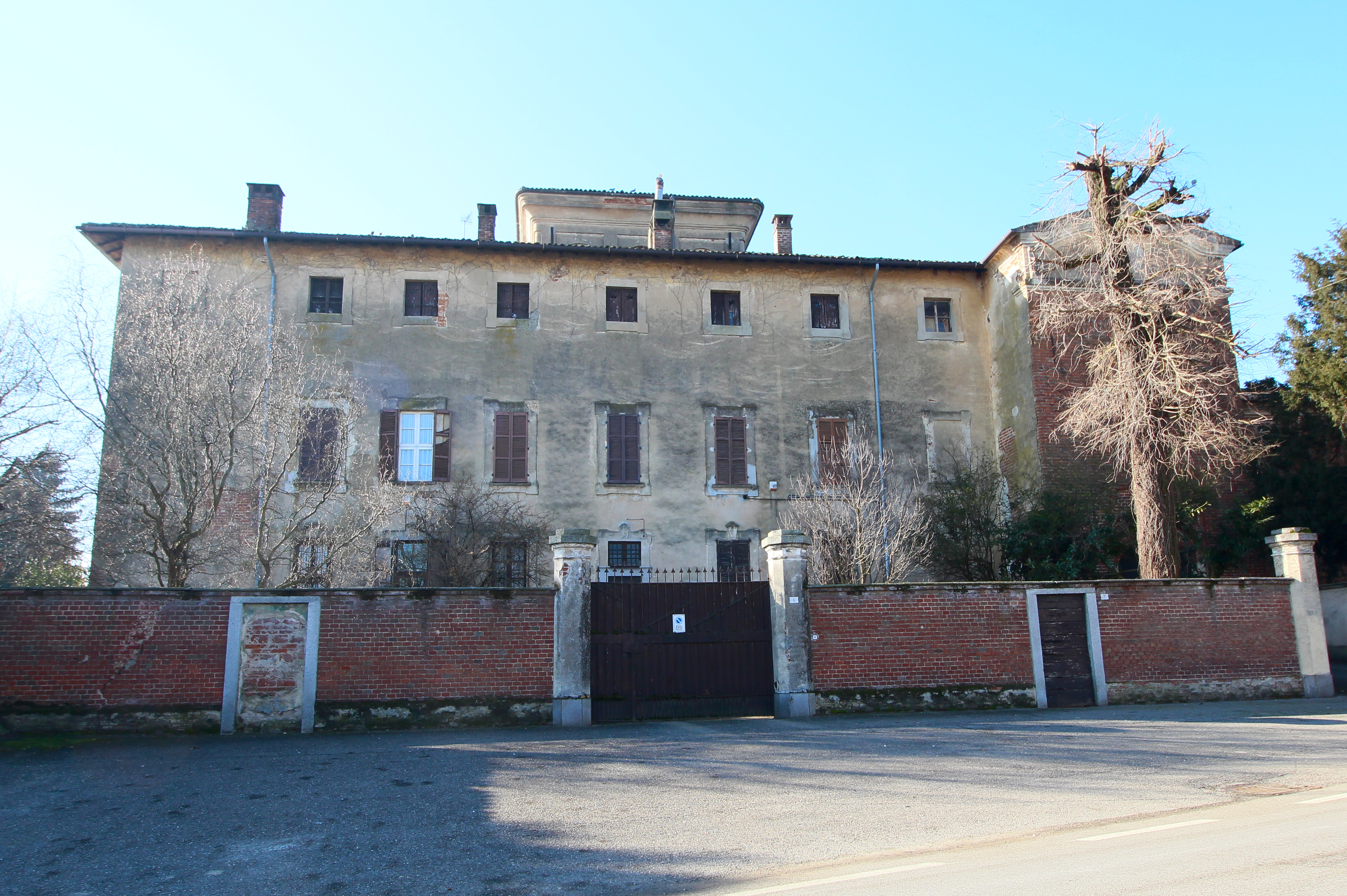
Castle Castello di Galliavola

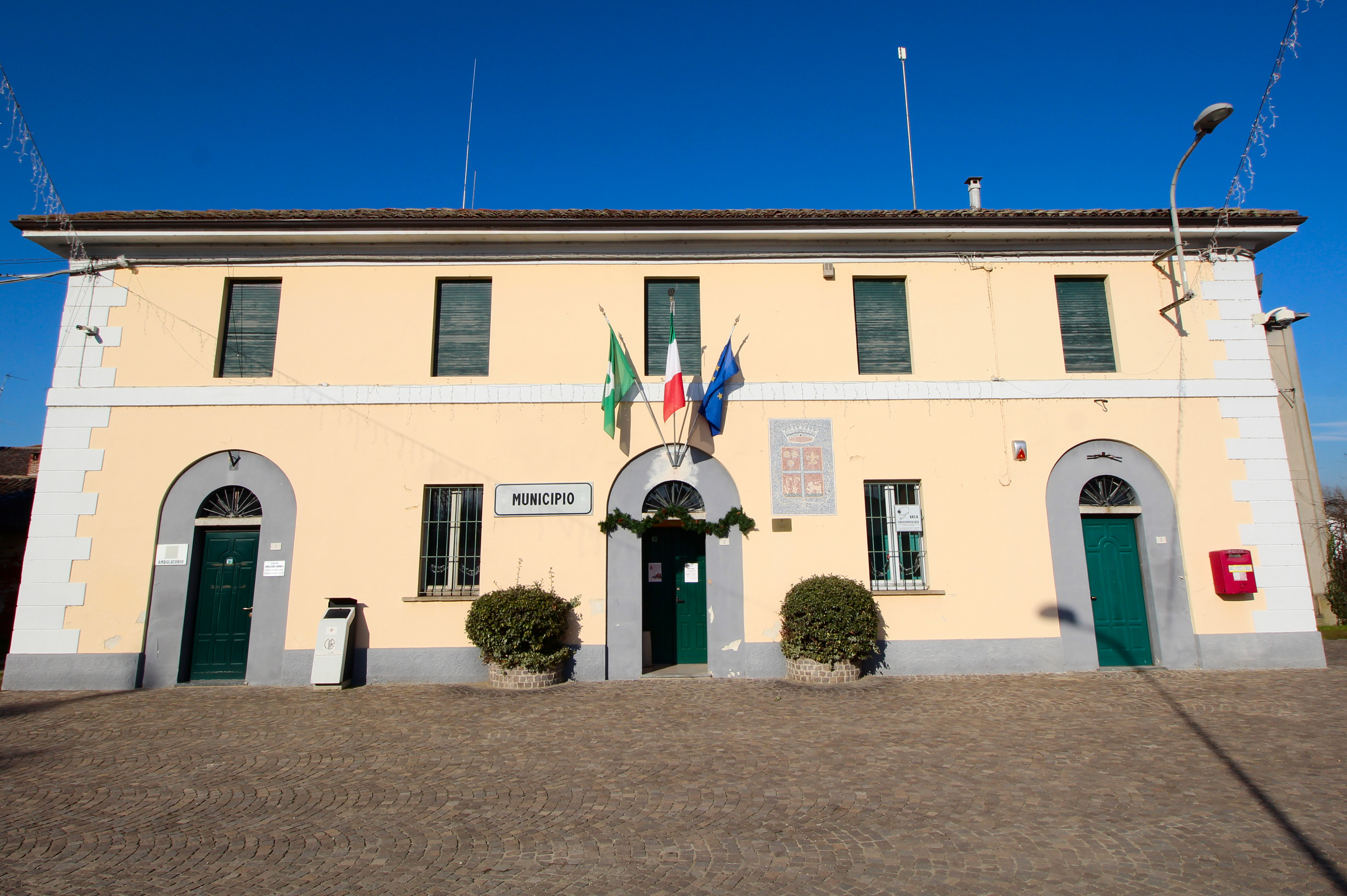
Town hall

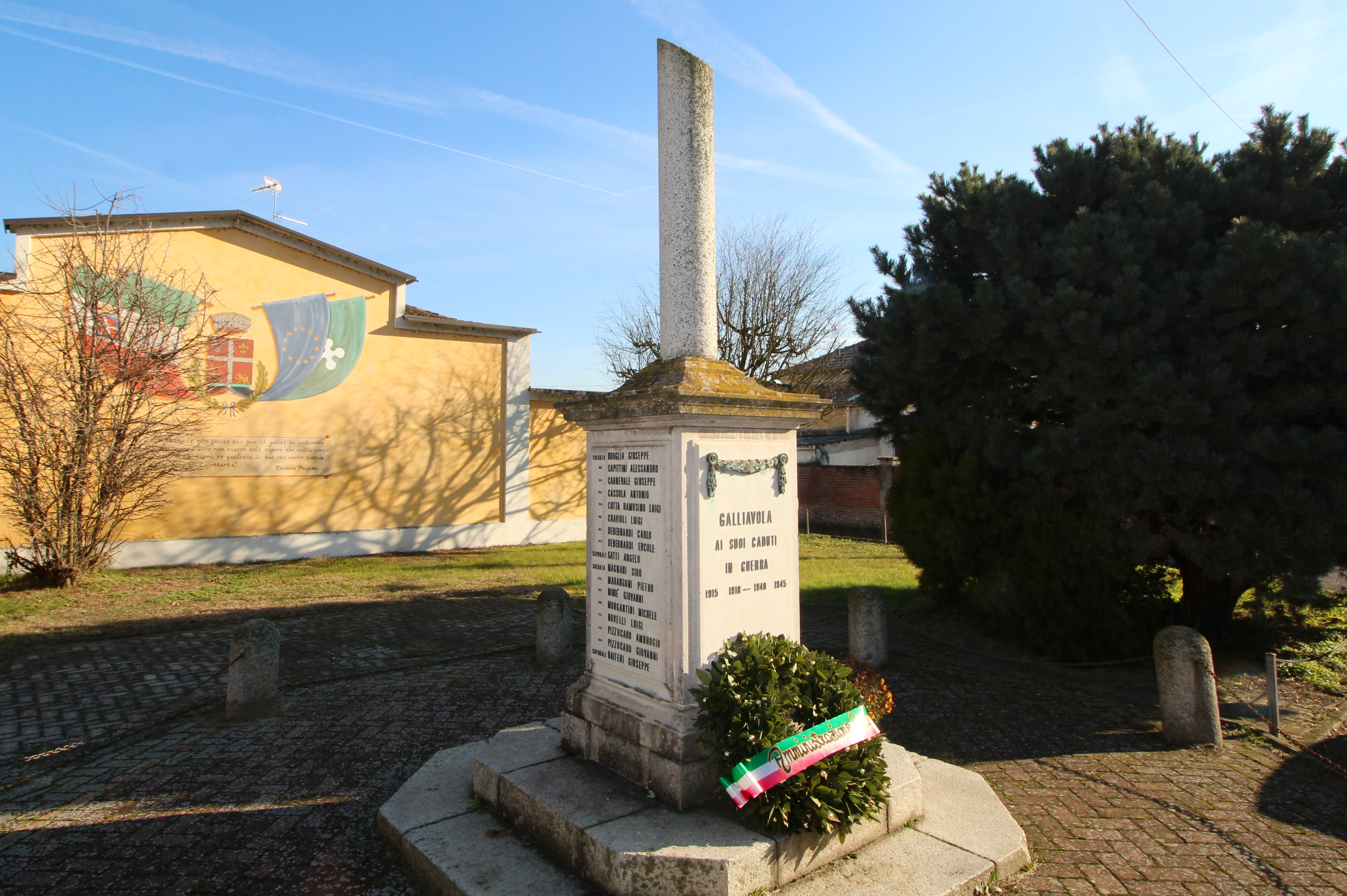
Monumento ai Caduti

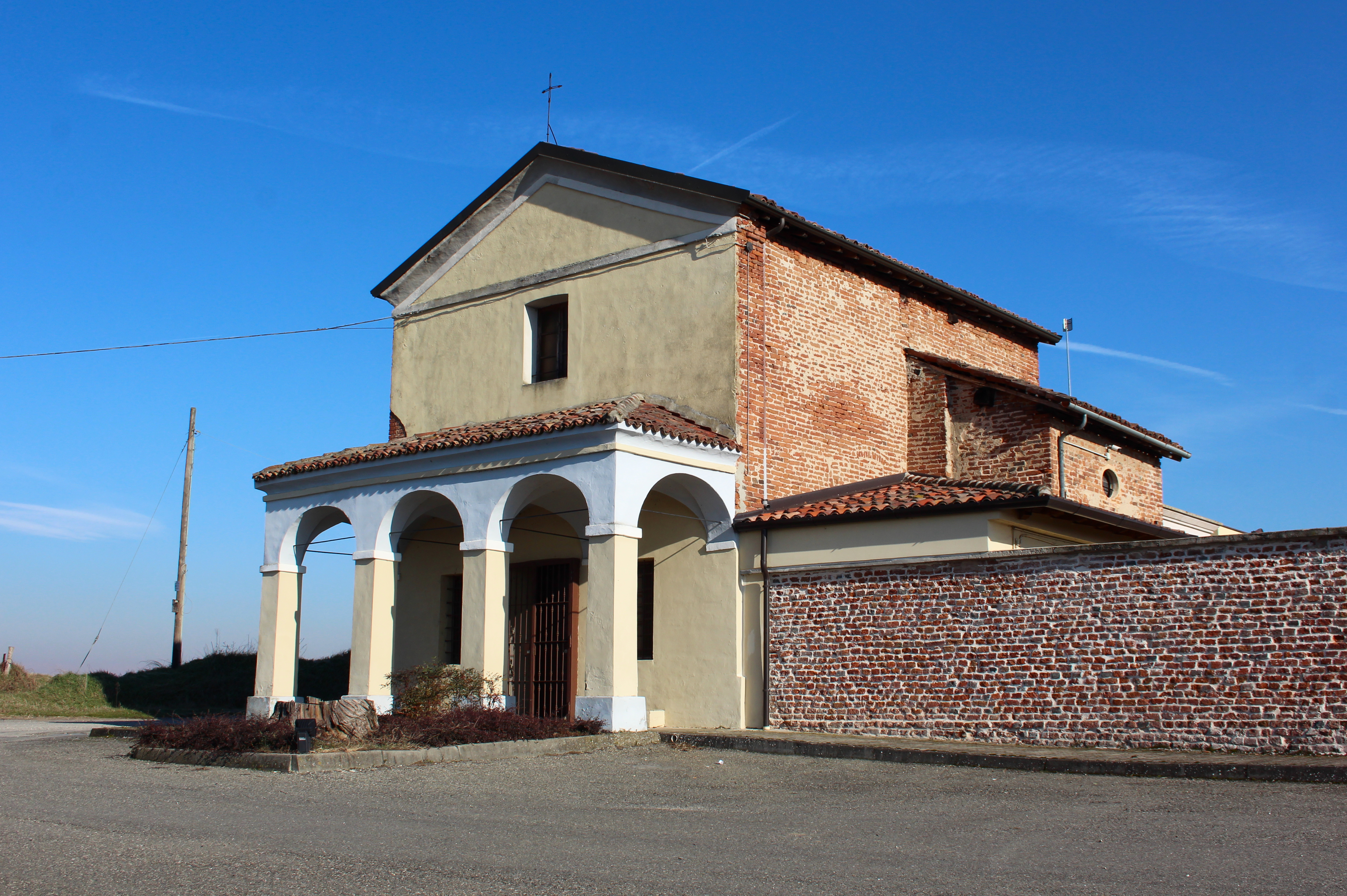
Church Beata Vergine Addolorata allo Zerbaiolo
