= Lomello Baptistery of San Giovanni ad Fontes =

Religious edifice in Italy

Coordinates: 45°7′20.72″N 8°47′38.45″E

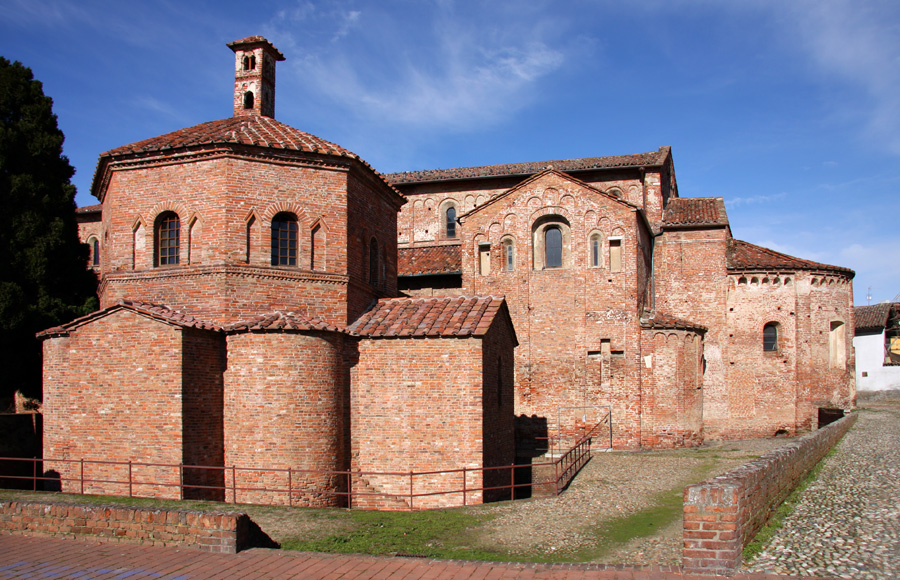
View of the baptistery with the basilica behind.

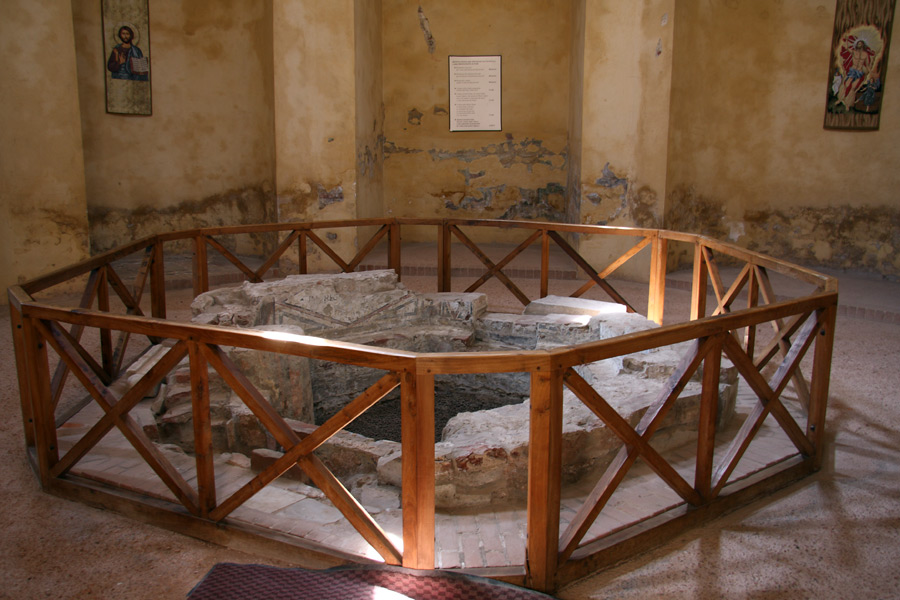
Remains of the baptismal font.

The Baptistery of San Giovanni ad Fontes is a religious edifice in Lomello, Lombardy, northern Italy. An example of Romanesque-Lombard architecture, it is annexed to the basilica of Santa Maria Maggiore, another early Middle Ages structure.

== Description ==
The baptistery has a typical cross plan, but in the interior the central part forms an octagon, over which is a dome of the same shape. The interior is wholly plastered, and can be accessed from two portals. The baptistery has, on the east-west axis, an overall length of 16 m.

The main element is the baptismal font, dating to the 7th-8th centuries.

The baptistery has an elevation of 13 m and is entirely built of brickworks, parts of which date to the 5th-6th centuries. The dome is a later addition (c. 10th century), and was built using less precious materials.

== See also ==
- Early medieval domes
