= Santa Maria Maggiore, Lomello =

Church building in Lomello, Italy

Coordinates: 45°7′21.20″N 8°47′38.85″E

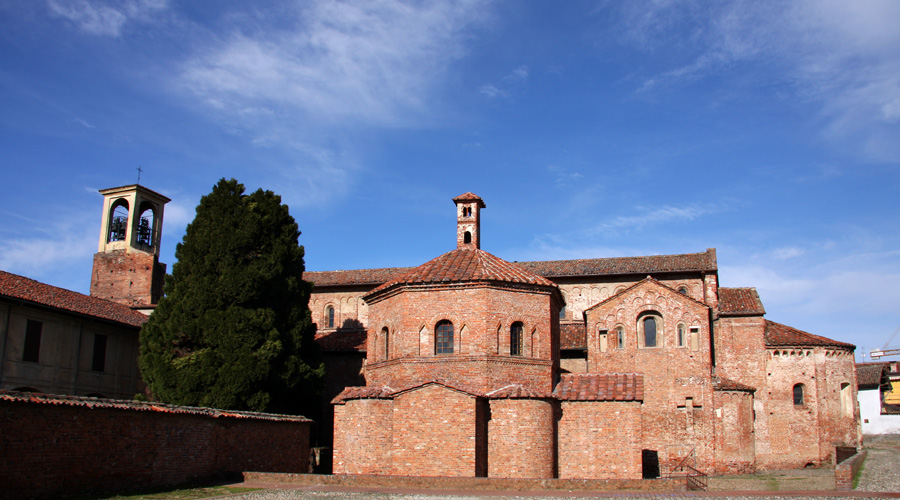
View of the basilica complex.

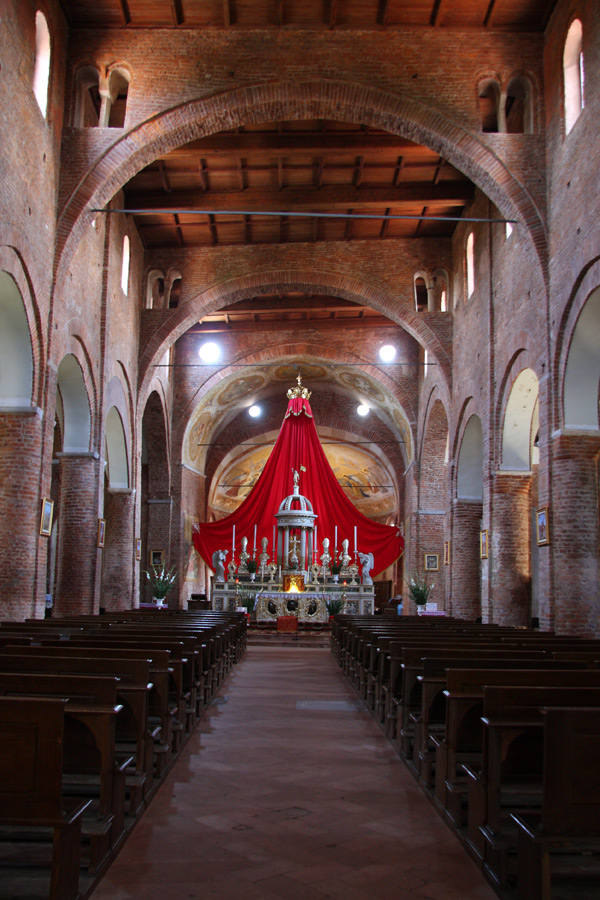
Interior view.

Santa Maria Maggiore is a church in Lomello, province of Pavia, Lombardy, Italy, an example of First Romanesque art. It includes the oldest cross vaults in Italy.

The oldest document mentioning the basilica is a privilege by pope Paschal II, dated 22 August 1107. Archaeological studies showed that at least two churches existed in the site before the current one, the earliest one being perhaps contemporary to the annexed baptistery of San Giovanni ad Fontes (c. 5th-7th centuries). The basilica has a nave and two aisles with a lower transept. The façade was originally embedded in the city's walls, but later the first three bays were abandoned and a new façade was obtained by closing one of the internal arches with a new wall.

The nave is characterized by arches which, at the sides, have double mullioned windows at the sides. The pillars which do not support the arches are prolonged by blind columns up to the clerestory. The longitudinal arches (those separating the nave from the aisles) are supported by semicolumns which form the pillars. The aisles are a 14th-century reconstruction of the original ones. In 1944 a crypt, perhaps unfinished, was discovered.

Adejacent to the basilica is the nearly coeval Baptistery of San Giovanni ad Fontes.

== Description ==
The basilica has three naves with a transept lower than the main body. It was one of the first churches in Italy to have ribbed vaulting in the side aisles, before the Romanesque style became widespread. The façade was very solid, incorporating the old Castilian walls; after an earthquake or collapse, which some attribute to the earthquake of 1117, the first three intercolumniations were abandoned, and a façade was built, closing one of the diaphragm arches.

== Sources ==
- Kingsley Porter, Arthur (1967). Lombard architecture. New York: Harcker Art Books.
