= Villa Biscossi =

Villa Biscossi la Vila (Lombard)
- Comune
- Comune di Villa Biscossi
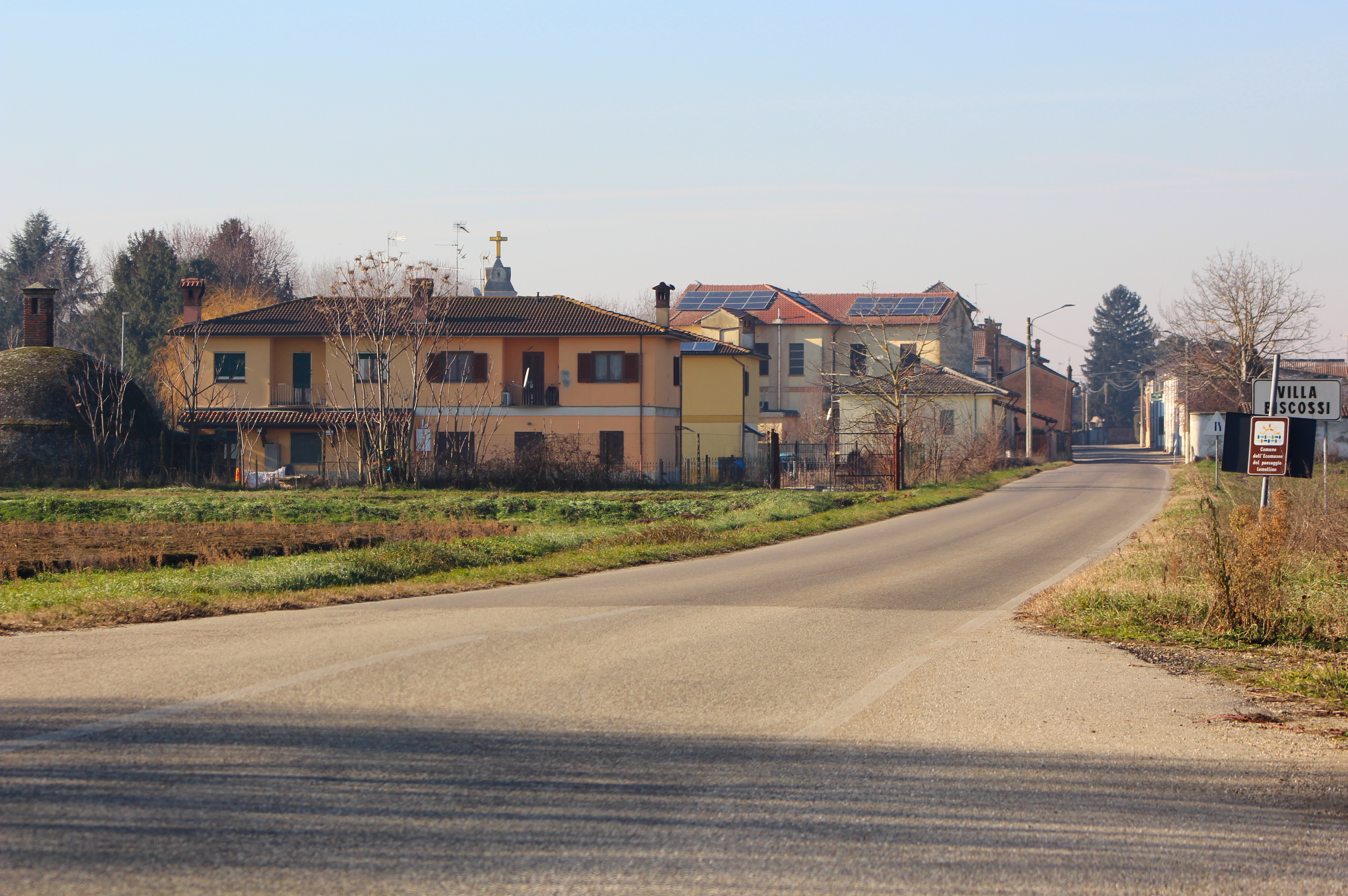

- Location within Italy Location within Lombardy
- Coordinates: 45°5′N 8°47′E
- Country: Italy
- Region: Lombardy
- Province: Province of Pavia (PV)

Area
  - Total: 5.0 km^{2} (1.9 sq mi)

Population (Dec. 2004)
  - Total: 74
  - Density: 15/km^{2} (38/sq mi)
- Time zone: UTC+1 (CET)
  - Summer (DST): UTC+2 (CEST)
- Postal code: 27035
- Dialing code: 0384

Villa Biscossi (Lombard: La Vila) is a comune (municipality) in the Province of Pavia in the Italian region of Lombardy, located about 50 km (31 mi) southwest of Milan and about 30 km (19 mi) southwest of Pavia. As of 31 December 2004, it had a population of 74 and an area of 5 km^{2} (1.9 sq mi).

Villa Biscossi borders the following municipalities: Galliavola, Lomello, Mede, Pieve del Cairo.

== Demographic evolution ==
Historical population

| Year | Pop. | ±% |
|---|---|---|
| 1861 | 497 | — |
| 1871 | 404 | −18.7% |
| 1881 | 370 | −8.4% |
| 1901 | 312 | −15.7% |
| 1911 | 406 | +30.1% |

| Year | Pop. | ±% |
|---|---|---|
| 1921 | 360 | −11.3% |
| 1931 | 361 | +0.3% |
| 1936 | 338 | −6.4% |
| 1951 | 334 | −1.2% |
| 1961 | 279 | −16.5% |

| Year | Pop. | ±% |
|---|---|---|
| 1971 | 141 | −49.5% |
| 1981 | 94 | −33.3% |
| 1991 | 87 | −7.4% |
| 2001 | 73 | −16.1% |

Source: Data from ISTAT

== Gallery ==
Images of Villa Biscossi

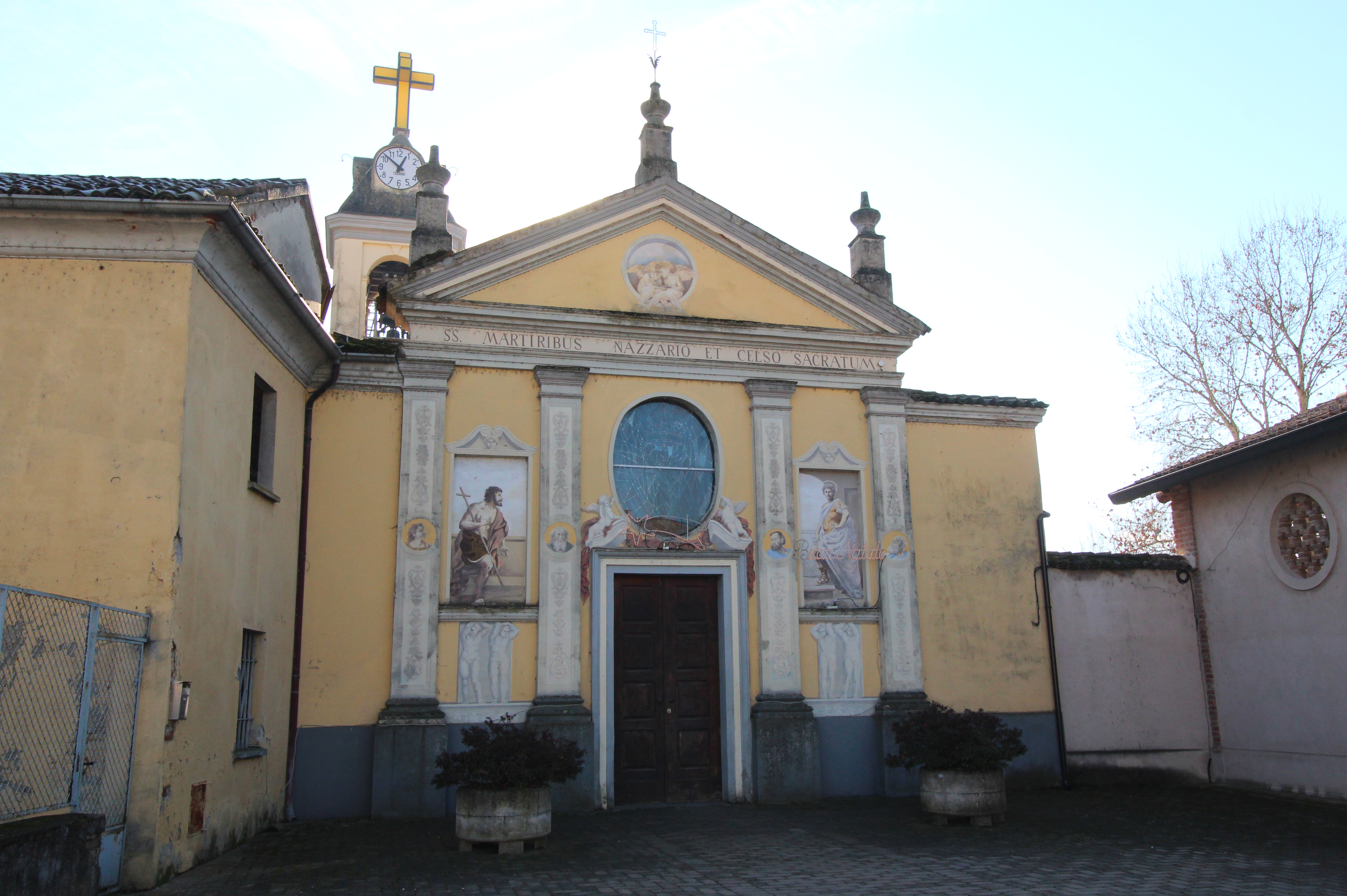
Church Santi Nazzaro e Celso

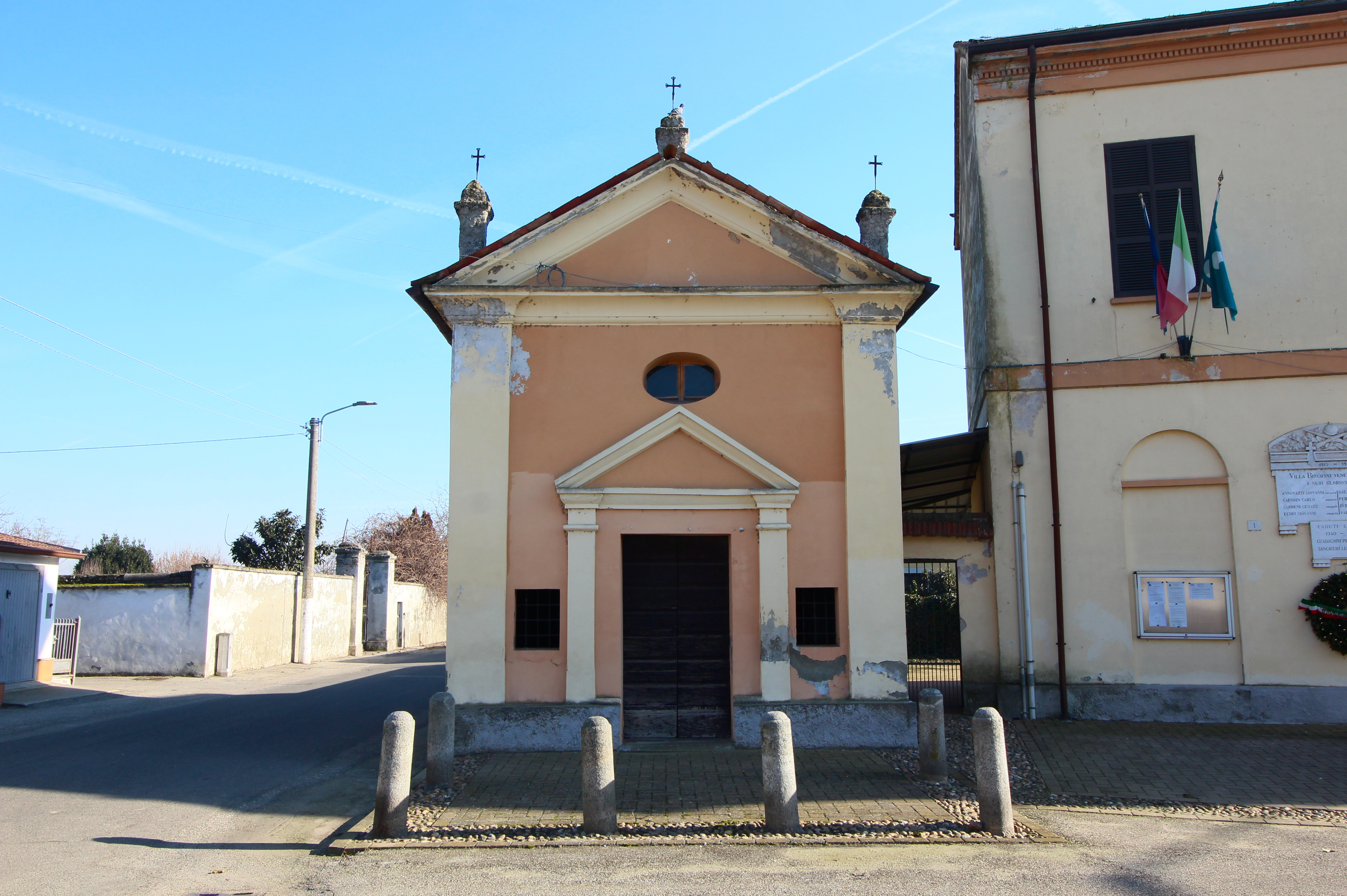
Church Santi Gervasio e Protasio

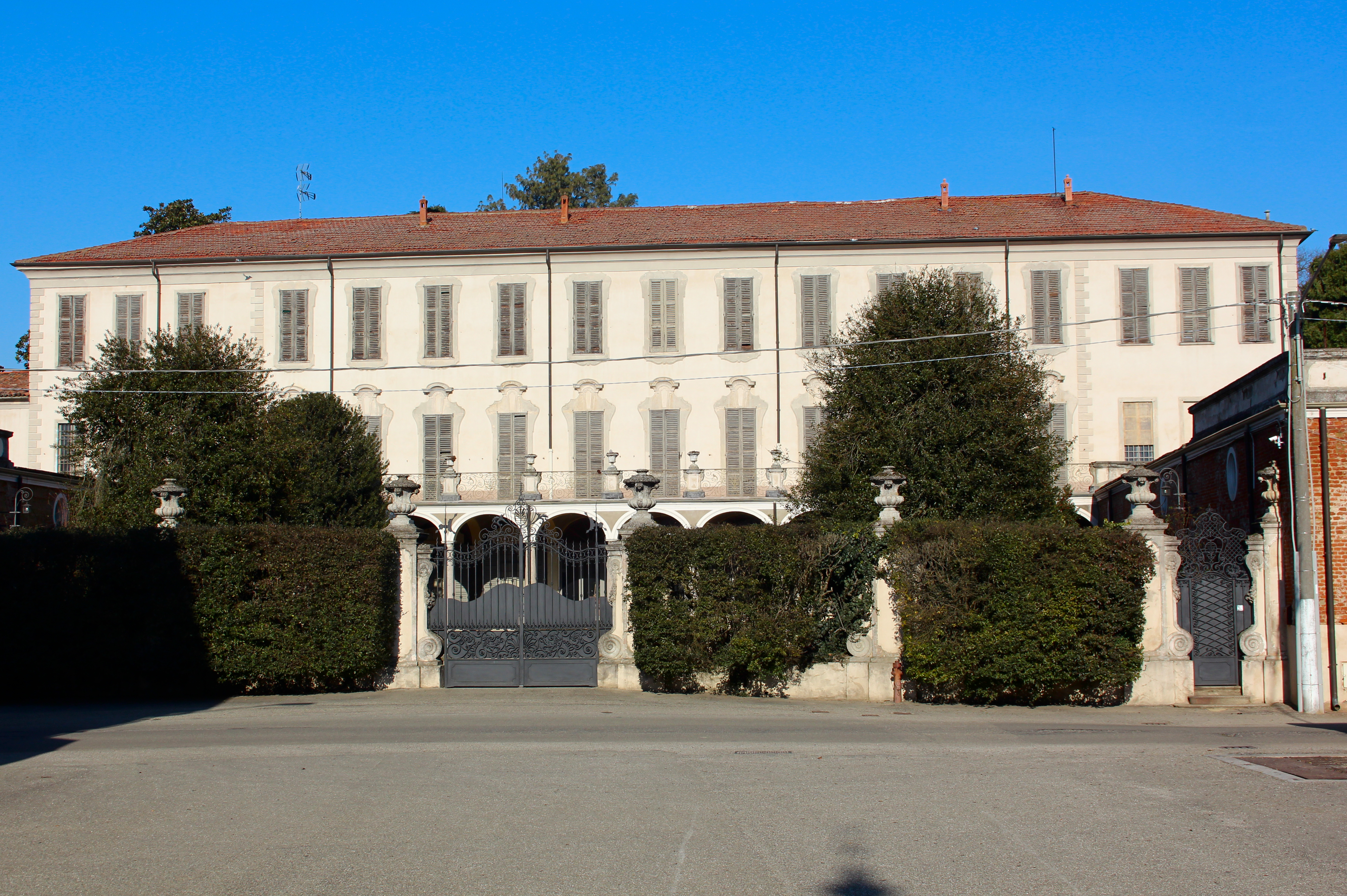
Palace Palazzo Casale

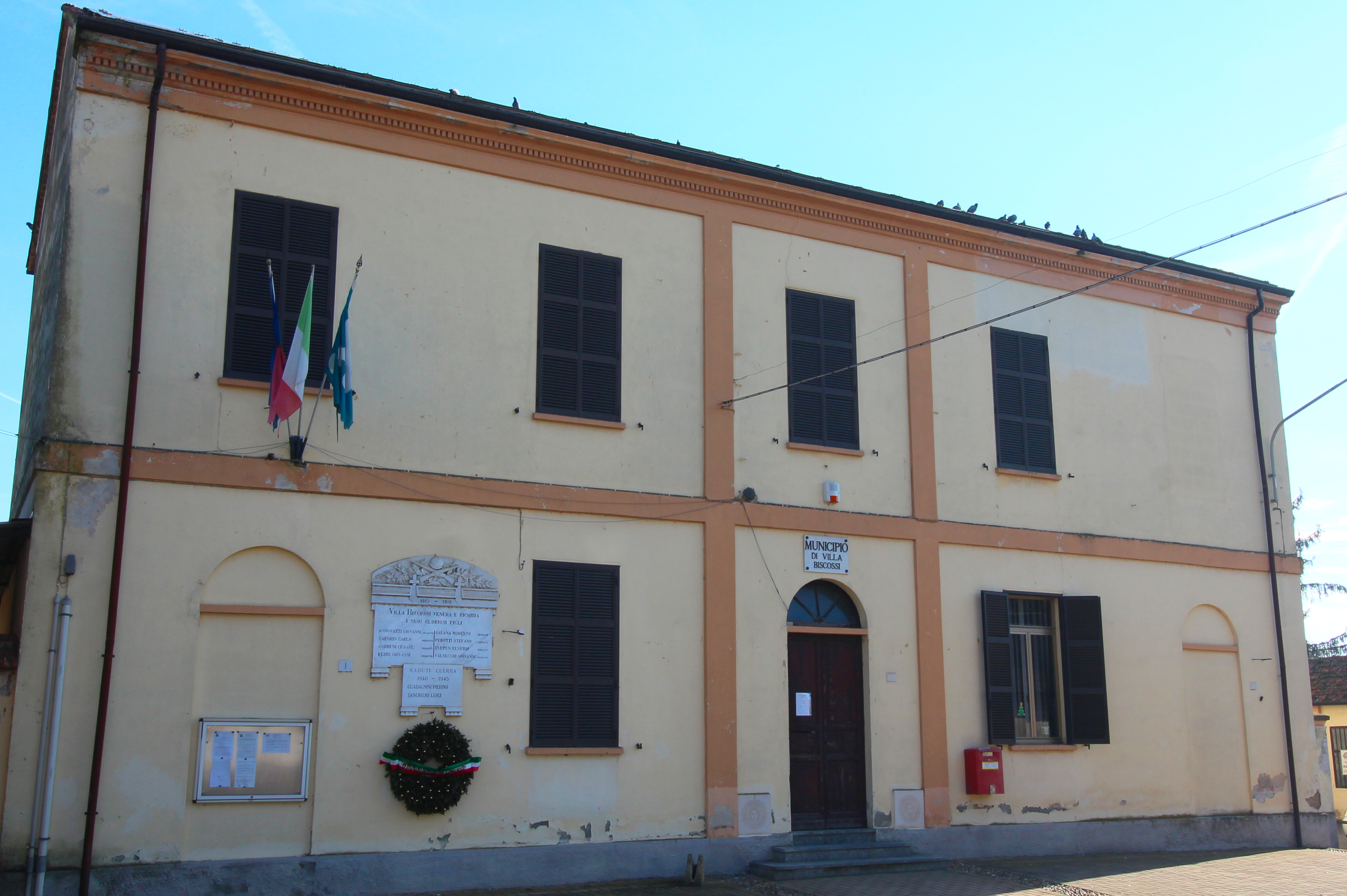
Town hall
