= Suardi =

- Comune
- Comune di Suardi
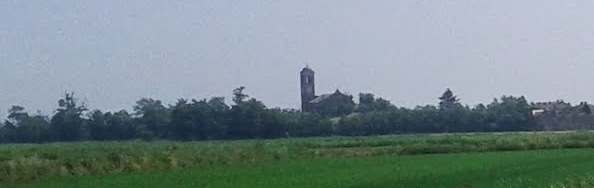

- Location within Italy Location within Lombardy
- Coordinates: 45°3′N 8°43′E
- Country: Italy
- Region: Lombardy
- Province: Province of Pavia (PV)

Area
  - Total: 9.8 km^{2} (3.8 sq mi)

Population (Dec. 2004)
  - Total: 692
  - Density: 71/km^{2} (180/sq mi)
- Time zone: UTC+1 (CET)
  - Summer (DST): UTC+2 (CEST)
- Postal code: 27030
- Dialing code: 0

Suardi is a comune (municipality) in the Province of Pavia in the Italian region Lombardy, located about 60 km (37 mi) southwest of Milan and about 35 km (22 mi) southwest of Pavia. As of 31 December 2004, it had a population of 692 and an area of 9.8 km^{2} (3.8 sq mi).

Suardi borders the following municipalities: Bassignana, Frascarolo, Gambarana, Valenza.

== Demographic evolution ==
Historical population

Year	Pop.	±%
1861	1,664	—
1871	1,830	+10.0%
1881	1,863	+1.8%
1901	1,860	−0.2%
1911	1,559	−16.2%

Year	Pop.	±%
1921	1,382	−11.4%
1931	1,195	−13.5%
1936	1,108	−7.3%
1951	1,047	−5.5%
1961	960	−8.3%

Year	Pop.	±%
1971	825	−14.1%
1981	709	−14.1%
1991	698	−1.6%
2001	703	+0.7%

Source: Data from ISTAT

== Notable people ==
- Roberto Casone, footballer
