= Ottobiano =

- Comune
- Comune di Ottobiano
- Location within Italy Location within Lombardy
- Coordinates: 45°9′N 8°50′E
- Country: Italy
- Region: Lombardy
- Province: Province of Pavia (PV)

Area
  - Total: 24.5 km^{2} (9.5 sq mi)

Population (Dec. 2004)
  - Total: 1,168
  - Density: 47.7/km^{2} (123/sq mi)
- Time zone: UTC+1 (CET)
  - Summer (DST): UTC+2 (CEST)
- Postal code: 27030
- Dialing code: 0384

Ottobiano is a comune (municipality) in the Province of Pavia in the Italian region Lombardy, located about 45 km (28 mi) southwest of Milan and about 25 km (16 mi) west of Pavia. As of 31 December 2004, it had a population of 1,168 and an area of 24.5 km^{2} (9.5 sq mi).

Ottobiano borders the following municipalities: Ferrera Erbognone, Lomello, San Giorgio di Lomellina, Tromello, Valeggio.

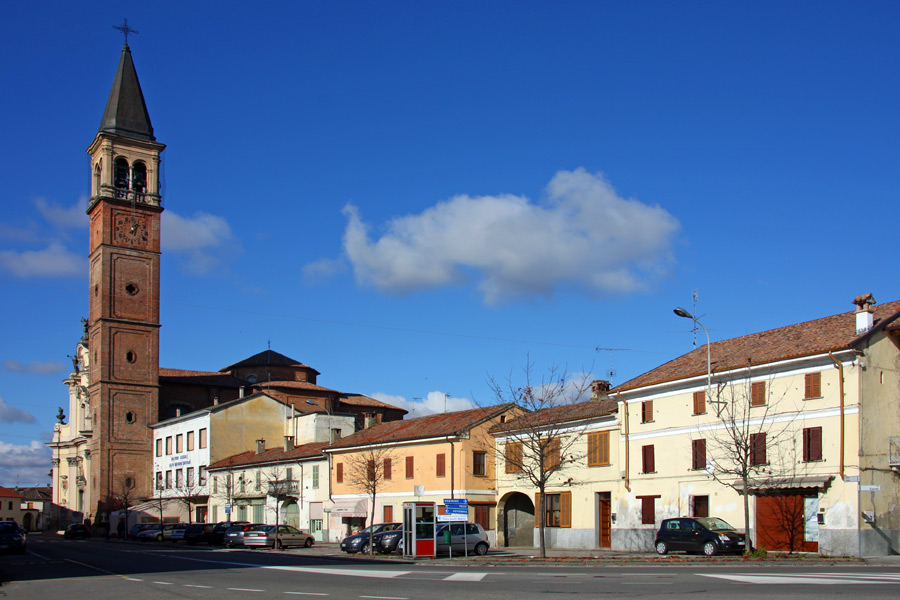
Ottobiano

== Demographic evolution ==
Historical population

Year	Pop.	±%
1861	2,670	—
1871	2,891	+8.3%
1881	3,136	+8.5%
1901	3,162	+0.8%
1911	2,895	−8.4%

Year	Pop.	±%
1921	2,531	−12.6%
1931	2,142	−15.4%
1936	2,197	+2.6%
1951	2,093	−4.7%
1961	1,854	−11.4%

Year	Pop.	±%
1971	1,438	−22.4%
1981	1,190	−17.2%
1991	1,092	−8.2%
2001	1,131	+3.6%

Source: Data from ISTAT

== Notable people ==
- Victorio Codovilla (1894–1970), communist politician
