= Mede, Lombardy =

Mede
- Comune
- Comune di Mede
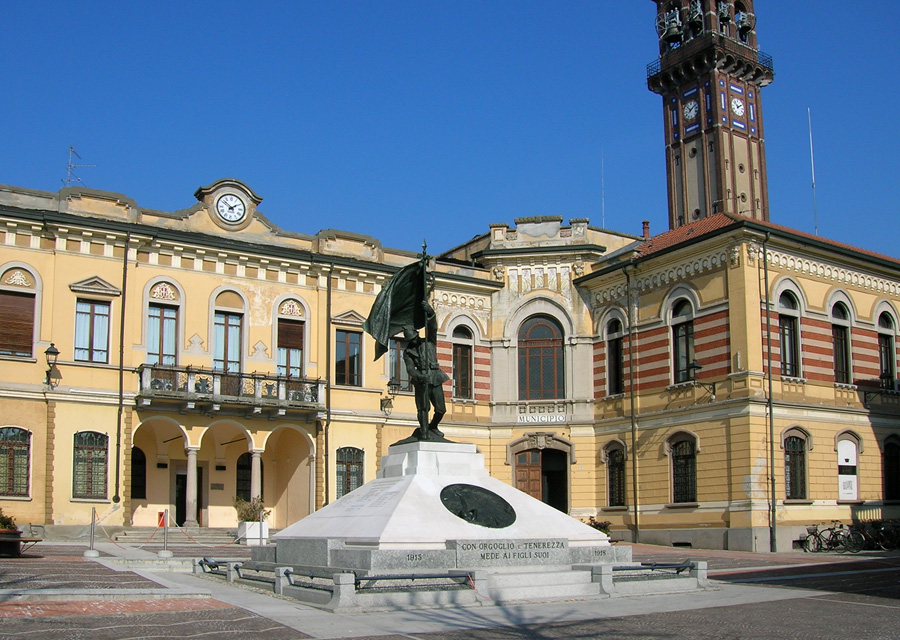
- Town hall

- Location within Italy Location within Lombardy
- Coordinates: 45°6′N 8°44′E
- Country: Italy
- Region: Lombardy
- Province: Province of Pavia (PV)

Government
  - Mayor: Lorenzo Demartini

Area
  - Total: 33.2 km^{2} (12.8 sq mi)

Population (Dec. 2004)
  - Total: 6,993
  - Density: 211/km^{2} (546/sq mi)
- Time zone: UTC+1 (CET)
  - Summer (DST): UTC+2 (CEST)
- Postal code: 27035
- Dialing code: 0384
- Website: http://www.comune.mede.pv.it/

Mede is a comune (municipality) in the Province of Pavia in the Italian region Lombardy, located about 50 km southwest of Milan and about 35 km southwest of Pavia. As of 31 December 2004, it had a population of 6,993 and an area of 33.4 km^{2}.

Mede borders the following municipalities: Frascarolo, Gambarana, Lomello, Pieve del Cairo, Sartirana Lomellina, Semiana, Torre Beretti e Castellaro, Villa Biscossi.

== Demographic evolution ==
Historical population

Year	Pop.	±%
1861	6,240	—
1871	6,827	+9.4%
1881	7,416	+8.6%
1901	7,266	−2.0%
1911	7,373	+1.5%
1921	6,769	−8.2%

Year	Pop.	±%
1931	6,202	−8.4%
1936	6,078	−2.0%
1951	6,524	+7.3%
1961	6,990	+7.1%
1971	7,240	+3.6%
1981	7,415	+2.4%

Year	Pop.	±%
1991	7,138	−3.7%
2001	6,924	−3.0%
2011	6,987	+0.9%
2021	6,423	−8.1%

Source: Data from ISTAT
