= Semiana =

- Comune
- Comune di Semiana
- Location within Italy Location within Lombardy
- Coordinates: 45°8′N 8°44′E
- Country: Italy
- Region: Lombardy
- Province: Province of Pavia (PV)

Area
  - Total: 9.9 km^{2} (3.8 sq mi)

Population (Dec. 2004)
  - Total: 256
  - Density: 26/km^{2} (67/sq mi)
- Time zone: UTC+1 (CET)
  - Summer (DST): UTC+2 (CEST)
- Postal code: 27020
- Dialing code: 0384

Semiana is a comune (municipality) in the Province of Pavia in the Italian region Lombardy, located about 50 km (31 mi) southwest of Milan and about 35 km (22 mi) west of Pavia. As of 31 December 2004, it had a population of 256 and an area of 9.9 km^{2} (3.8 sq mi).

Semiana borders the following municipalities: Lomello, Mede, Sartirana Lomellina, Valle Lomellina, Velezzo Lomellina.

== Demographic evolution ==
Historical population

Year	Pop.	±%
1861	1,125	—
1871	1,181	+5.0%
1881	1,359	+15.1%
1901	1,295	−4.7%
1911	1,236	−4.6%

Year	Pop.	±%
1921	1,078	−12.8%
1931	976	−9.5%
1936	911	−6.7%
1951	939	+3.1%
1961	701	−25.3%

Year	Pop.	±%
1971	455	−35.1%
1981	336	−26.2%
1991	257	−23.5%
2001	256	−0.4%

Source: Data from ISTAT
