= Pieve del Cairo =

- Comune
- Comune di Pieve del Cairo
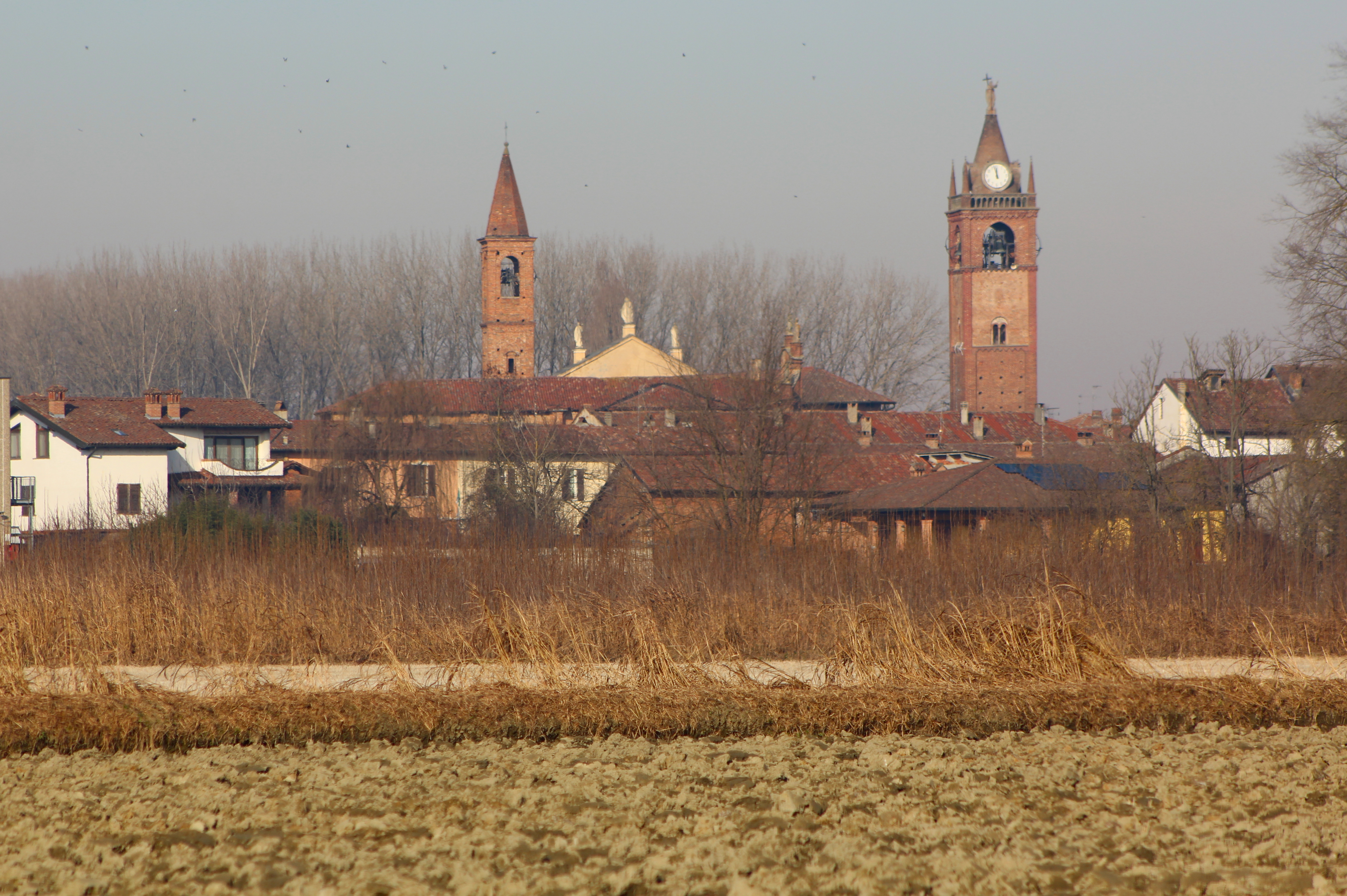

- Location within Italy Location within Lombardy
- Coordinates: 45°2′N 8°48′E
- Country: Italy
- Region: Lombardy
- Province: Province of Pavia (PV)

Area
  - Total: 25.5 km^{2} (9.8 sq mi)
- Elevation: 80 m (260 ft)

Population (Dec. 2004)
  - Total: 2,179
  - Density: 85.5/km^{2} (221/sq mi)
- Demonym: Pievani
- Time zone: UTC+1 (CET)
  - Summer (DST): UTC+2 (CEST)
- Postal code: 27037
- Dialing code: 0384

Pieve del Cairo is a comune (municipality) in the Province of Pavia in the Italian region of Lombardy, located about 60 km (37 mi) southwest of Milan and about 30 km (19 mi) southwest of Pavia. As of 31 December 2004, it had a population of 2,179 and an area of 25.5 km^{2} (9.8 sq mi).

Pieve del Cairo borders the municipalities of Ferrera Erbognone, Galliavola, Gambarana, Isola Sant'Antonio, Mede, Mezzana Bigli, and Villa Biscossi.

== Demographic evolution ==
Historical population

Year	Pop.	±%
1861	3,778	—
1871	4,091	+8.3%
1881	4,314	+5.5%
1901	4,373	+1.4%
1911	4,258	−2.6%

Year	Pop.	±%
1921	3,841	−9.8%
1931	3,381	−12.0%
1936	3,283	−2.9%
1951	3,113	−5.2%
1961	2,845	−8.6%

Year	Pop.	±%
1971	2,703	−5.0%
1981	2,497	−7.6%
1991	2,298	−8.0%
2001	2,166	−5.7%

Source: Data from ISTAT

== Images ==
Images of Pieve del Cairo

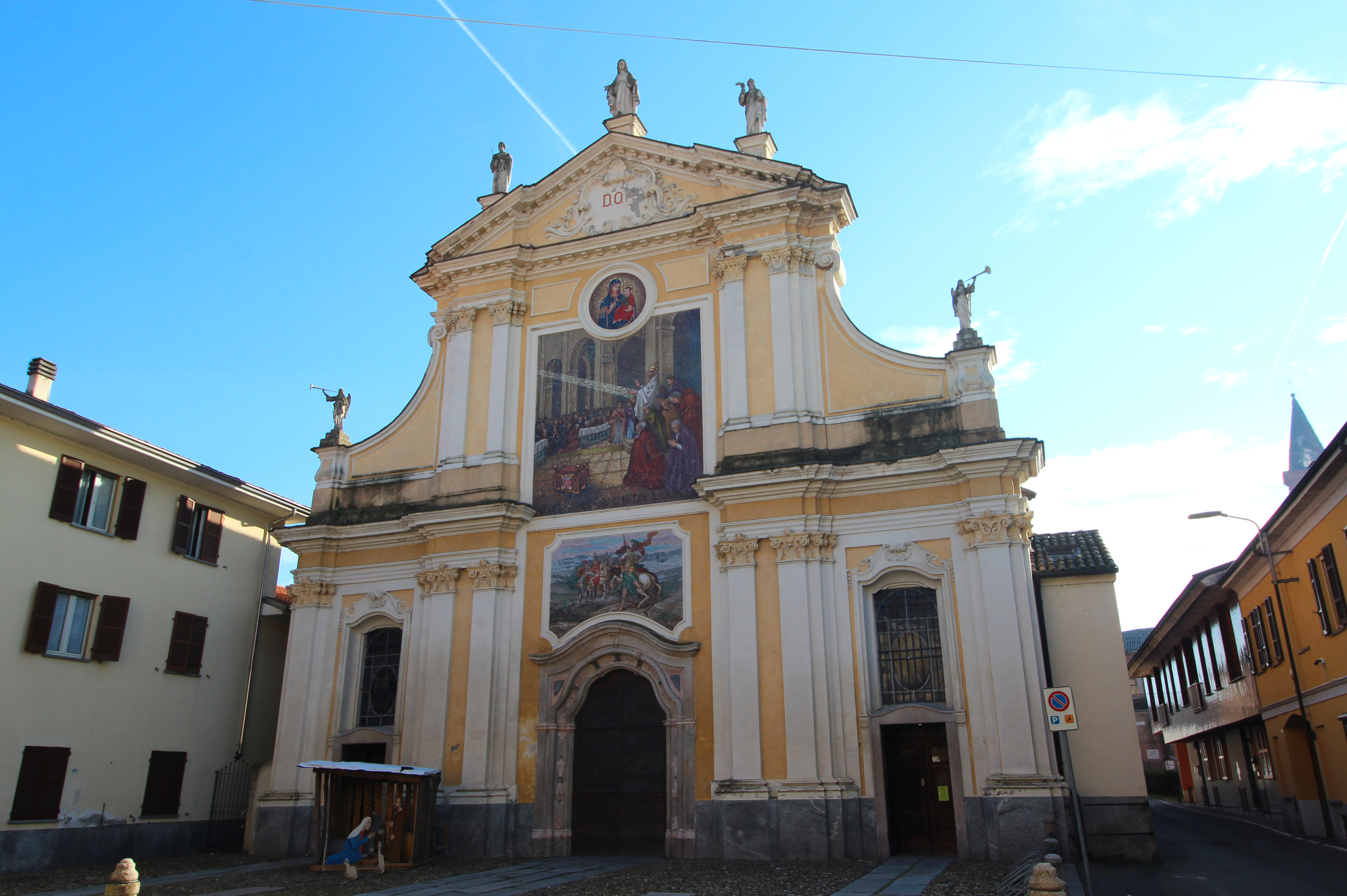
Church Beata Vergine della Consolazione

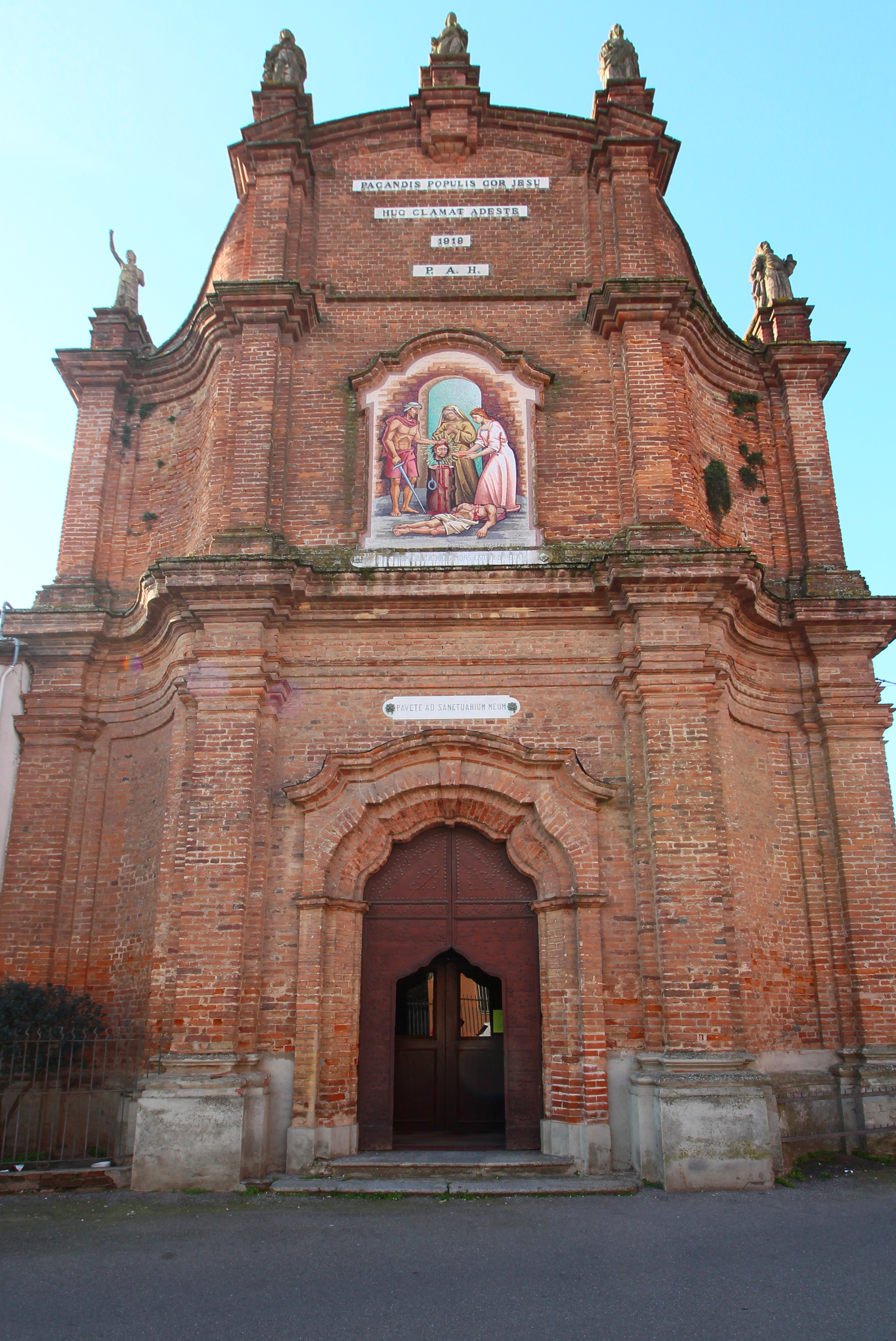
Church San Giovanni Battista

Castle Castello Beccaria

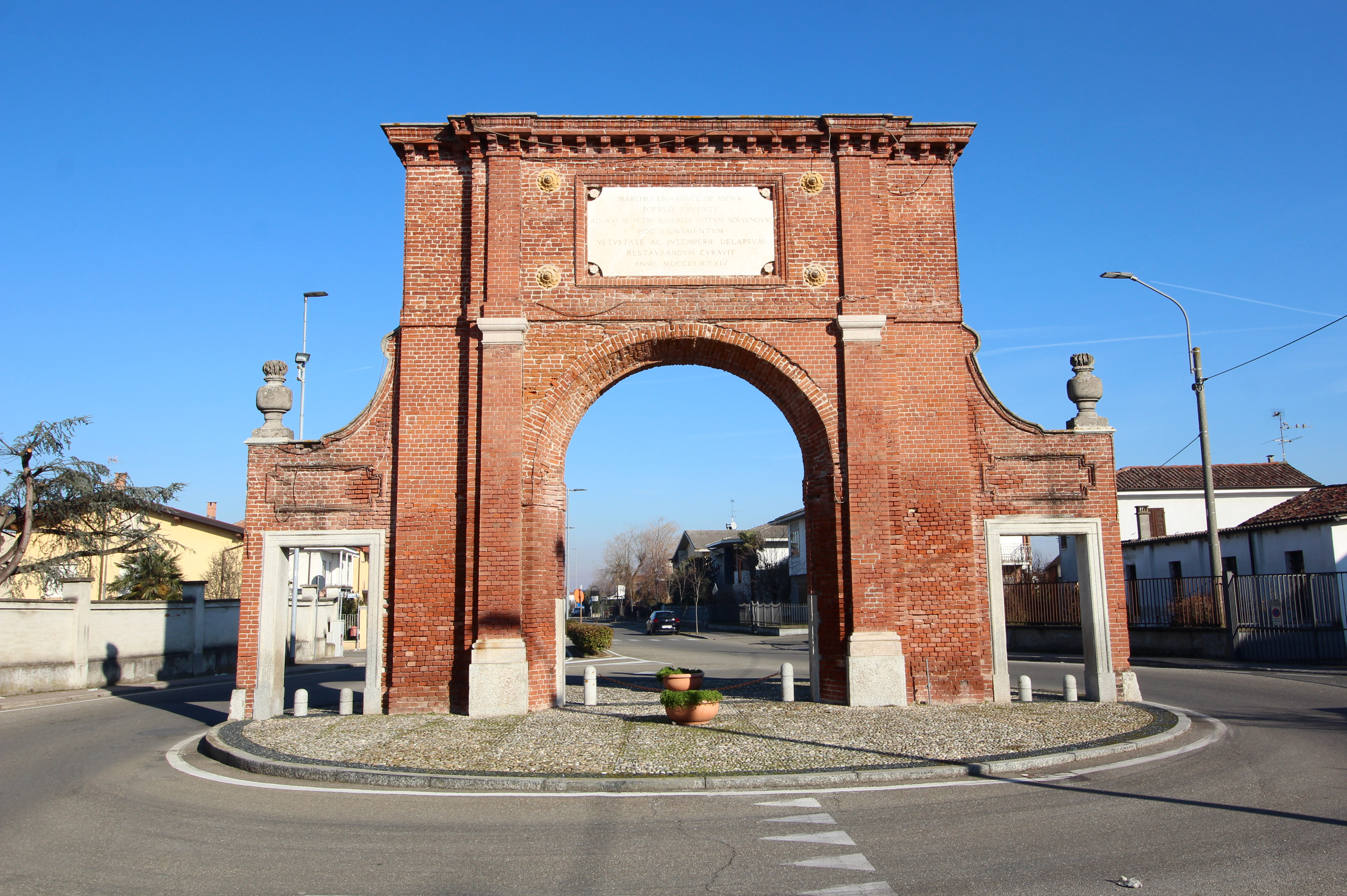
Arco Trionfale

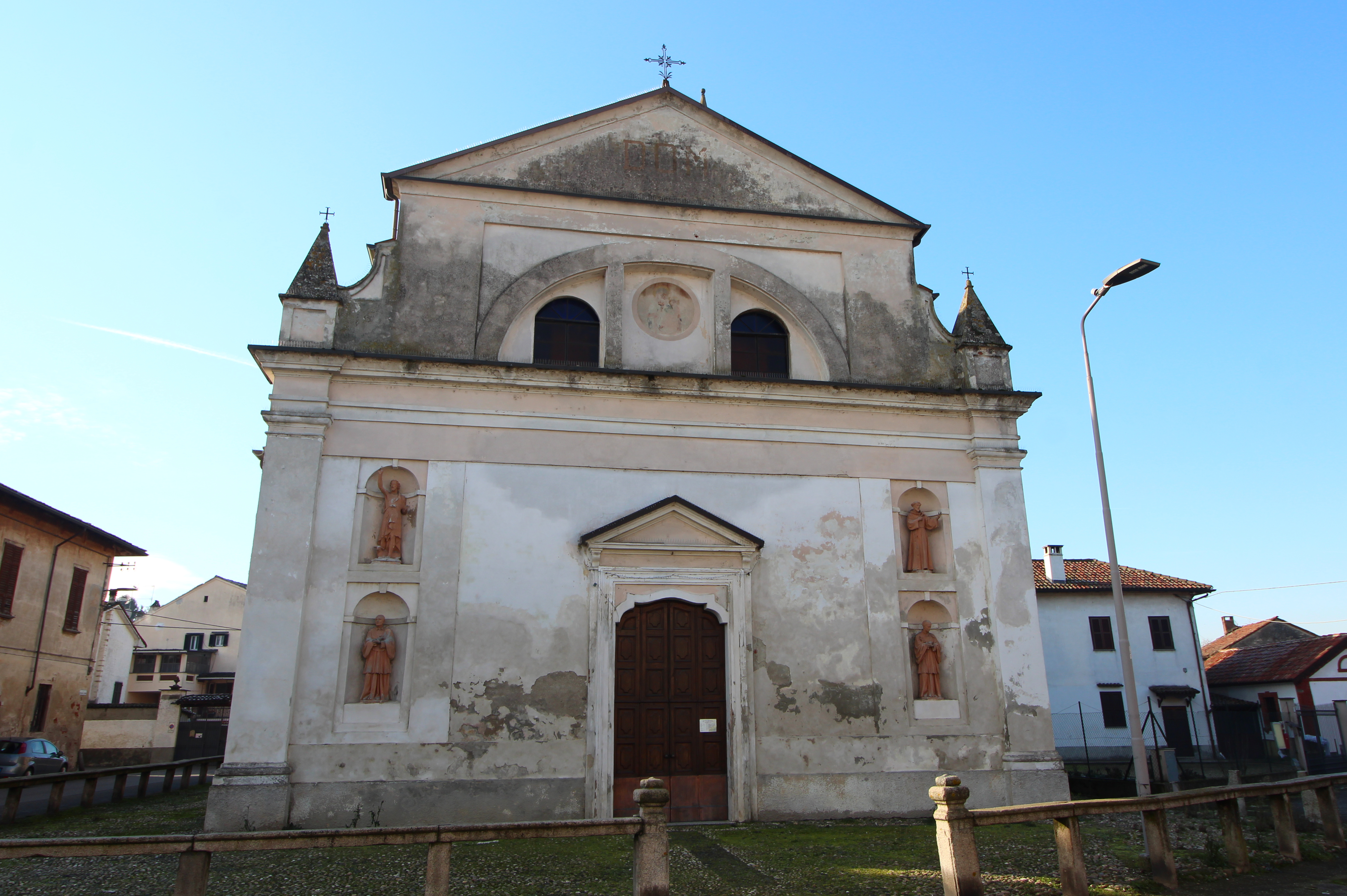
Chiesa del Cairo (Cairo Lomellino)
