= Gambarana =

- Comune
- Comune di Gambarana
- Location within Italy Location within Lombardy
- Coordinates: 45°2′N 8°46′E
- Country: Italy
- Region: Lombardy
- Province: Province of Pavia (PV)

Area
  - Total: 12.0 km^{2} (4.6 sq mi)

Population (Dec. 2021)
  - Total: 199
  - Density: 16.6/km^{2} (43.0/sq mi)
- Demonym: Gambaranesi
- Time zone: UTC+1 (CET)
  - Summer (DST): UTC+2 (CEST)
- Postal code: 27030
- Dialing code: 0384
- ISTAT code: 018067

Gambarana is a comune (municipality) in the Province of Pavia in the Italian region Lombardy, located about 60 km (37 mi) southwest of Milan and about 35 km (22 mi) southwest of Pavia. As of 31 December 2021, it had a population of 199 and an area of 12.0 km^{2} (4.6 sq mi).

Gambarana borders the following municipalities: Bassignana, Frascarolo, Isola Sant'Antonio, Mede, Pieve del Cairo, Suardi.

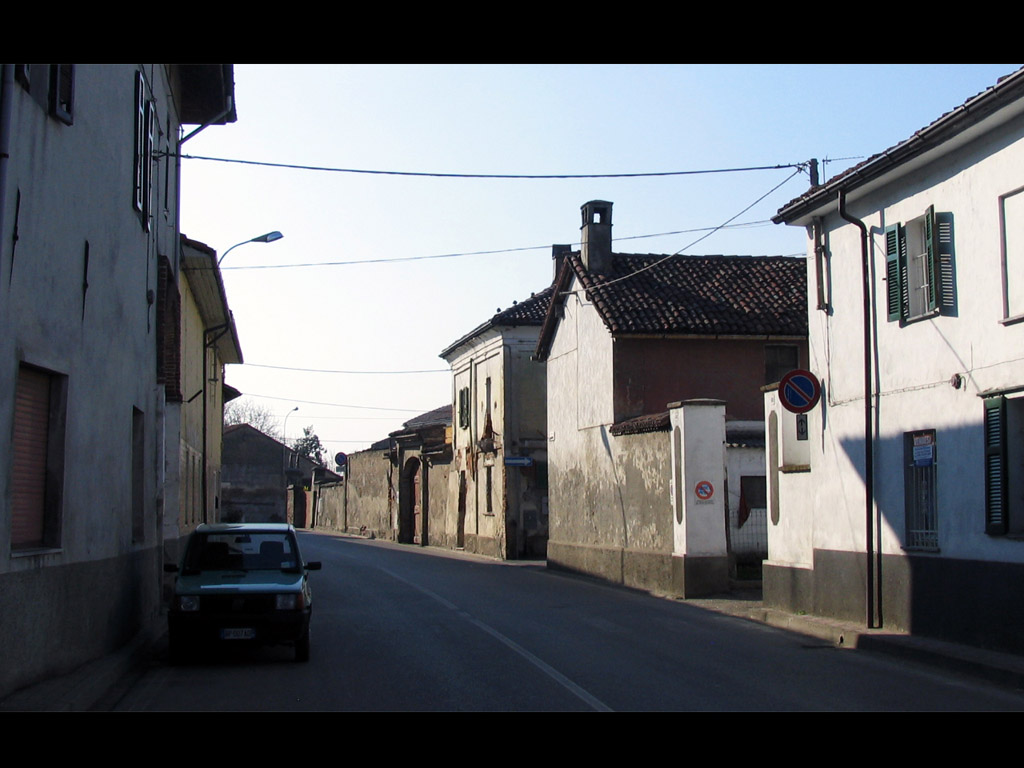
Street of Gambarana

== Demographic evolution ==
Historical population

Year	Pop.	±%
1861	1,001	—
1871	1,155	+15.4%
1881	1,154	−0.1%
1901	1,121	−2.9%
1911	950	−15.3%

Year	Pop.	±%
1921	852	−10.3%
1931	755	−11.4%
1936	722	−4.4%
1951	720	−0.3%
1961	602	−16.4%

Year	Pop.	±%
1971	447	−25.7%
1981	359	−19.7%
1991	309	−13.9%
2001	281	−9.1%

Source: Data from ISTAT
