= Olevano di Lomellina =

- Comune
- Comune di Olevano di Lomellina
- Coat of arms

- Location within Italy Location within Lombardy
- Coordinates: 45°13′N 8°43′E
- Country: Italy
- Region: Lombardy
- Province: Pavia (PV)
- Frazioni: Cascine Vallazza, Cascina Melegnana, Cascina Battaglia, Cascina Bianca, Cascina Paronina

Government
  - Mayor: Luca Mondin

Area
  - Total: 15.4 km^{2} (5.9 sq mi)
- Elevation: 105 m (344 ft)

Population (31 December 2007)
  - Total: 830
  - Density: 54/km^{2} (140/sq mi)
- Demonym: Olevanesi
- Time zone: UTC+1 (CET)
  - Summer (DST): UTC+2 (CEST)
- Postal code: 27020
- Dialing code: 0384
- Website: Official website

Olevano di Lomellina is a comune (municipality) in the Province of Pavia in the Italian region Lombardy, located about 45 km southwest of Milan and about 35 km west of Pavia.

Economy is mostly based on agriculture, the main cultivation being that of rice.

In recent years Met NewEn is forging ahead with the construction of its first wood biomass power plant in Italy. The 20 MW BiOlevano project is due to come on stream in the fourth quarter of 2011 at a cost of €80 million. A key feature is the development of the wood-chip supply chain. A high proportion (more than 85%) of the plant's raw materials will come from a short supply chain. The BiOlevano unit features very high conversion efficiency (more than 30%) and extremely low emissions, lower than any other biomass power plant in Italy. The plant, designed to deliver 140 GWhe per year of renewable energy, sufficient to meet the needs of about 50,000 families, will consume approximately 200,000 tonnes/year of wood chips. These will come mainly from poplar trees grown according to the short rotation forestry (SRF) formula, defined as high-density plantations of fast-growing species to be used for energy conversion. Taking into account the carbon capture cycle of its raw materials, the Olevano plant will reduce atmospheric emissions of CO_{2} by more than 100,000 tonnes/year by replacing electricity generated from fossil fuels.

== History ==
Located centrally in Lomellina, near the right bank of the Agogna, the village belonged to the Counts of Lomello. Some of them took up residence here and therefore received a title from the place. The feudal vassals, named thus Counts of Olevano, settled in an imposing, multi-towered castle probably built in the twelfth century, as we know that it was destroyed for the first time by Frederick Barbarossa. A second fortress was razed to the ground in 1404 by Facino Cane. A third reconstruction was finished in 1420.

Part of the feud was given to the Attendolo-Bologninis by emperor Frederick III in 1469. In 1551 it passed down to the Beccarias for a short time. In 1557 the castle was once more nearly destroyed by the French troops, but a new fortified building sprang up from those ruins and was attacked for the last time in 1745 by the Austrian army. The first drastic changes followed and the edifice was transformed in appearance and lay-out. More alterations from the following century, and the first decades of the present one, have given the building its final appearance, which can be observed nowadays.
