= Province of Brescia =

Province of Brescia Provincia di Brescia (Italian) Pruìnsa de Brèsa (Lombard)
- Province
- Broletto Palace, the provincial seat

- Flag Coat of arms

- Map highlighting the location of the province of Brescia in Italy
- Coordinates: 45°38′N 10°18′E
- Country: Italy
- Region: Lombardy
- Established: 23 October 1859
- Capital(s): Brescia
- Municipalities: 205

Government
  - President: Emanuele Moraschini

Area
  - Total: 4,785.62 km^{2} (1,847.74 sq mi)

Population (2026)
  - Total: 1,271,759
  - Density: 265.746/km^{2} (688.279/sq mi)

GDP
  - Total: €39.322 billion (2015)
  - Per capita: €36,900 (2021)
- Time zone: UTC+1 (CET)
  - Summer (DST): UTC+2 (CEST)
- Postal code: 25121-25136, 25010-25089
- Telephone prefixes: 030, 0364, 0365, 035
- ISO 3166 code: IT-BS
- Vehicle registration: BS
- ISTAT: 017
- Website: www.provincia.brescia.it

The province of Brescia (Italian: provincia di Brescia; Brescian: pruìnsa de Brèsa) is a province in the region of Lombardy in northern Italy. Its capital is the eponymous city of Brescia.

With a population 1,271,759 in an area of 4,785.62 square kilometres (1,847.74 sq mi) across its 205 municipalities, it is the largest province of Lombardy. It is also the 2nd province of the region for the number of inhabitants and 5th in Italy, or the 1st excluding metropolitan cities.

It borders the province of Sondrio to the north and north west, the province of Bergamo to the west, the province of Cremona to the south west and south, the province of Mantua to the south. On its northeastern border, Lake Garda—Italy's largest—is divided between Brescia and the neighboring provinces of Verona (Veneto region) and Trentino (Trentino-Alto Adige/Südtirol region).

The province stretches between Lake Iseo in the west, Lake Garda in the east, the Southern Rhaetian Alps in the north and the Lombardian plains in the south. The main rivers of the province are the Oglio, the Mella and the Chiese.

Besides Brescia, other important towns in the province are Travagliato, Darfo Boario Terme, Desenzano del Garda, Palazzolo sull'Oglio, Montichiari, Ghedi, Chiari, Rovato, Gussago, Rezzato, Concesio, Orzinuovi, Salò, Gardone Val Trompia and Lumezzane.

== Geography ==
The province of Brescia is the largest in the region, boasts three main lakes, Lake Garda, Lake Iseo and Lake Idro, plus several other smaller lakes, three valleys, Val Camonica, Val Trompia and Valle Sabbia, as well as a wide flat area south of the city, known as the Bassa Bresciana, and several hilly areas surrounding the city landscape and extending eastwards towards Veneto and west to Franciacorta.

Due to the altitude and morphological variety and the presence of large lakes, the province includes all kinds of biomes in Europe: from something similar to the maquis shrubland up to the perennial snow of Adamello (with the largest glacier in the Italian Alps).

=== Valleys ===
The three main valleys on the territory of Brescia are the Val Camonica, crossed by the river Oglio and inserted in the northwestern part of the province from Adamello to Lake Iseo; Val Trompia, the river Mella basin, between the comuni (municipalities) of Concesio and Collio; and the Valle Sabbia which includes the comuni from Serle to Bagolino along the course of the river Chiese.

All the three valleys have the point of union the Croce Domini Pass, which takes the name from the "cross" formed by the union of the three basins.

=== Lakes ===
Within the province there are eight lakes. The main lake basin, in both dimensional, climatic and cultural terms, is Lake Garda, shared with the Veneto and Trentino regions, which with its 370 km^{2} (140 sq mi) of surface is the biggest lake in Italy. Because of its size, the lake has a considerable influence on the climate and the surrounding environment, generating a micro-geographic area in a more mitigated climate both in summer and winter.

Lake Iseo is the second lake of the area, and is situated at about 180 m above sea level, in an area called Sebino, between Val Camonica (north) and Franciacorta (south), which divides the provinces of Bergamo and Brescia.

Lake Idro, the third lake within the provincial territory, is located in Valle Sabbia, on the border between Brescia and the province of Trento, and differs from the other two main lakes for its modest size. The waters of the lake are mainly exploited for the irrigation of crops in contiguous territories, as well as for the production of energy through a small power plant located in the comune of Vobarno.

Other small lakes in the province are: Lago della Vacca (at an elevation of 2,358 m, in one of the coldest points of the province), Lago d'Arno, Lago Aviolo, Lago Baitone, Lago Moro and Lago di Valvestino.

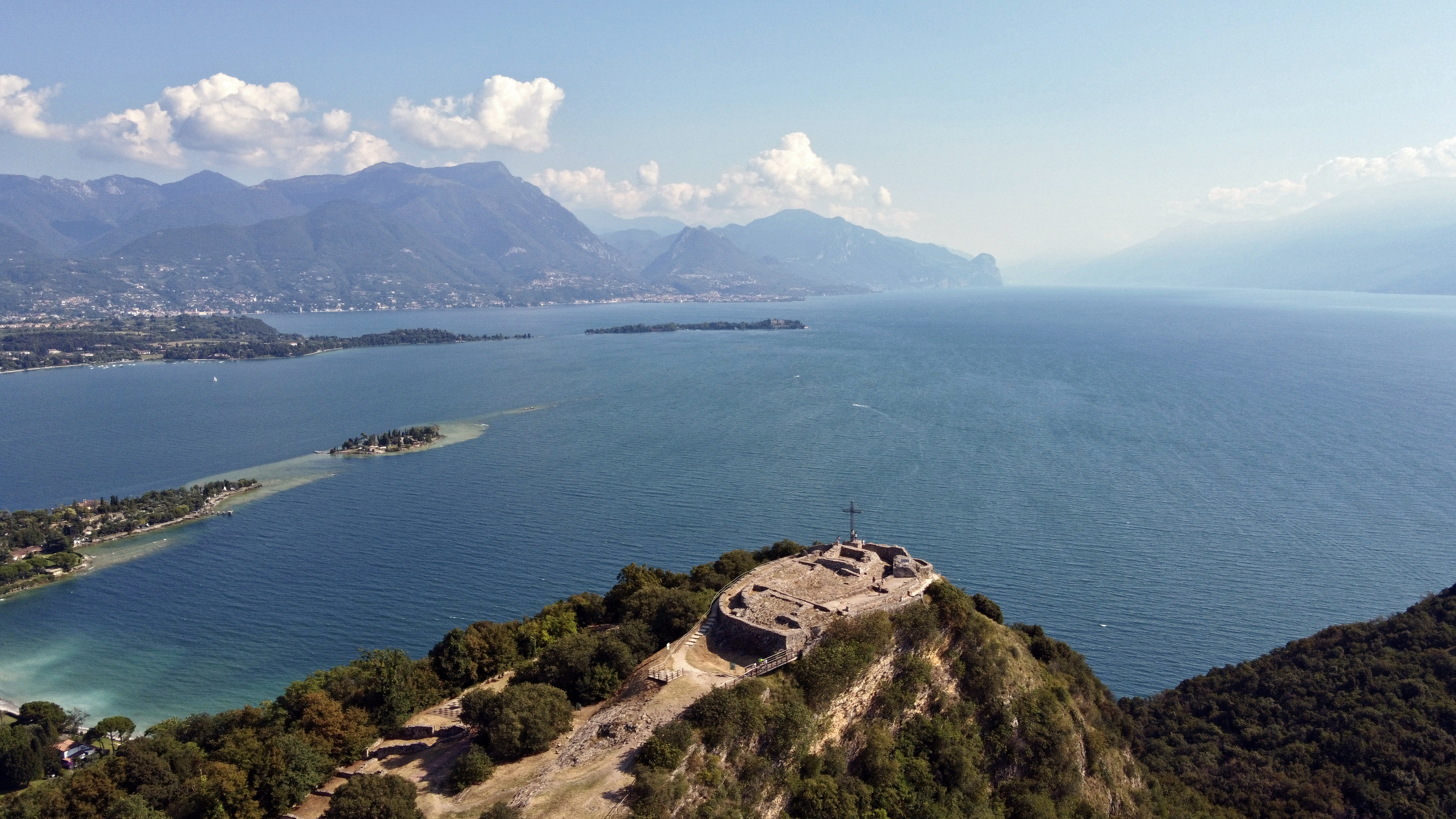
Lake Garda

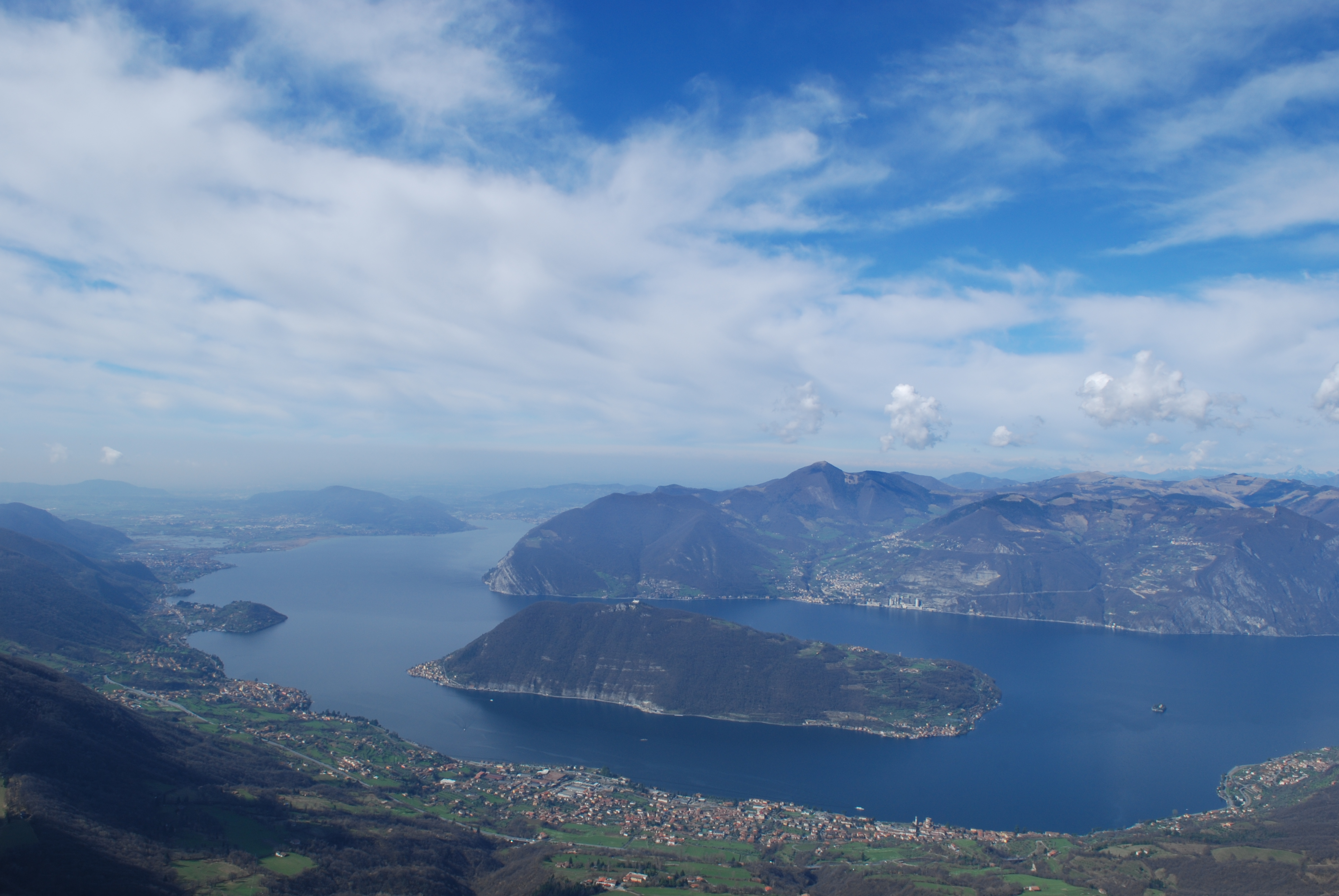
Lake Iseo with the isle of Montisola

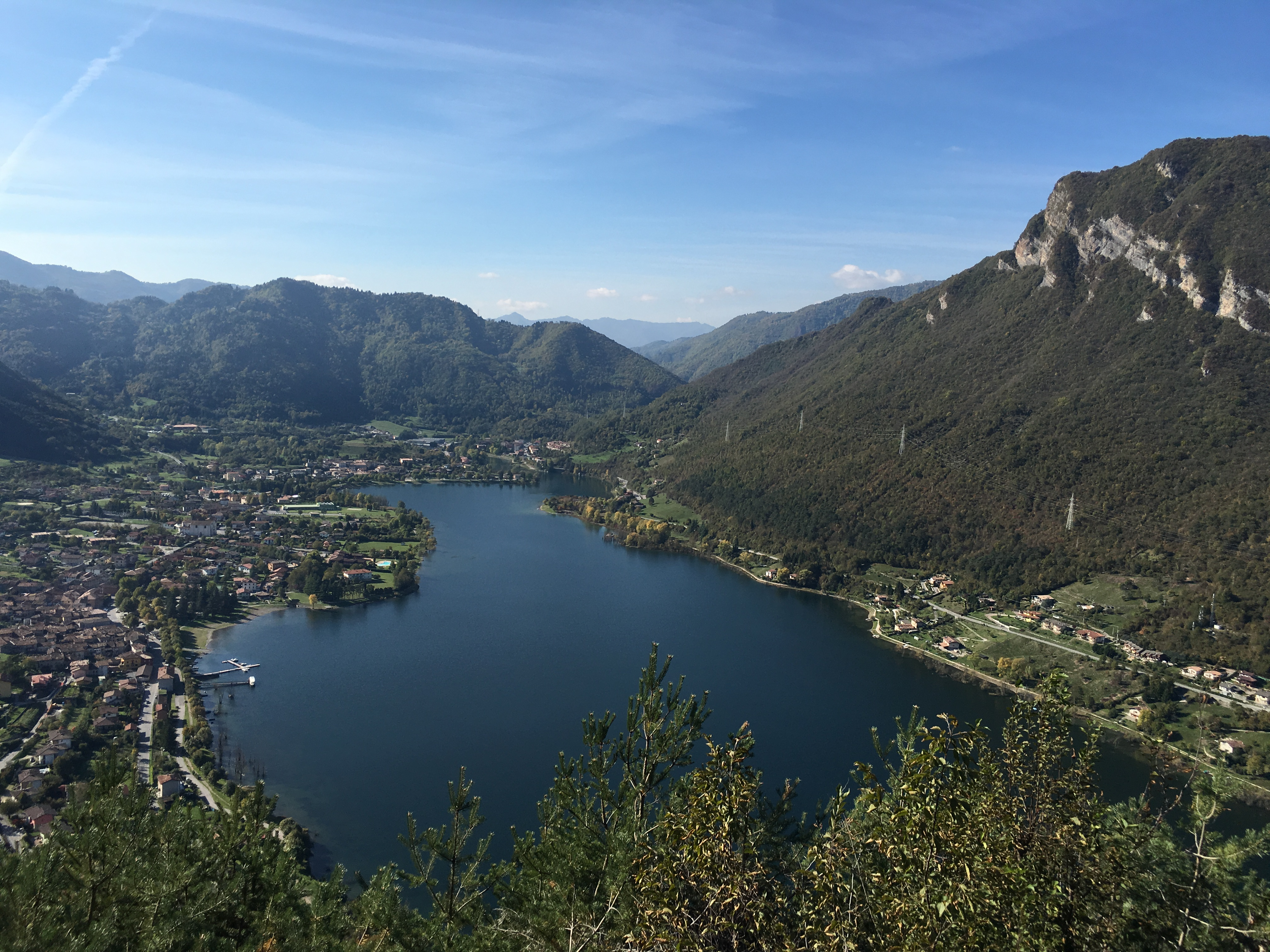
Lake Idro

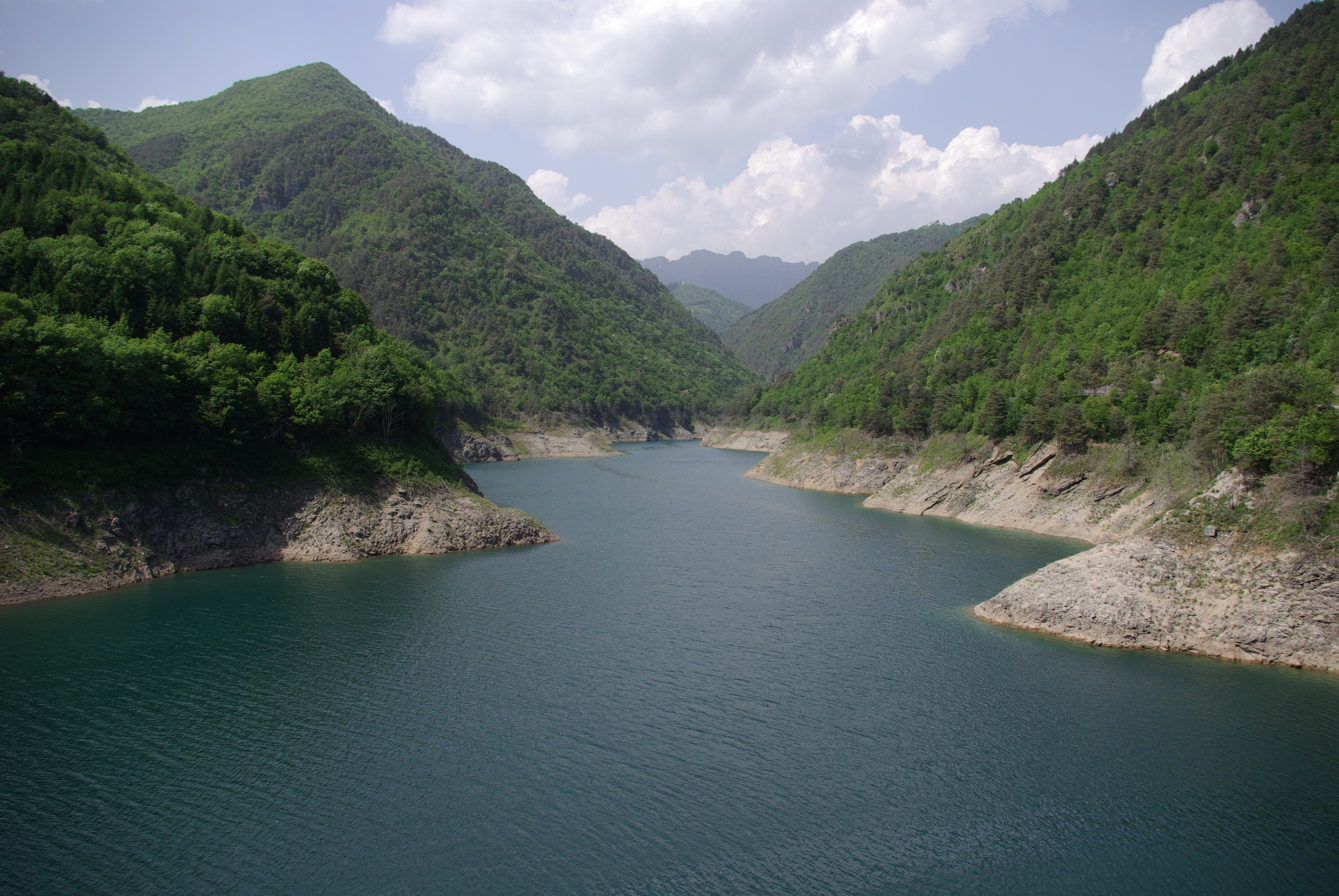
Lake Valvestino

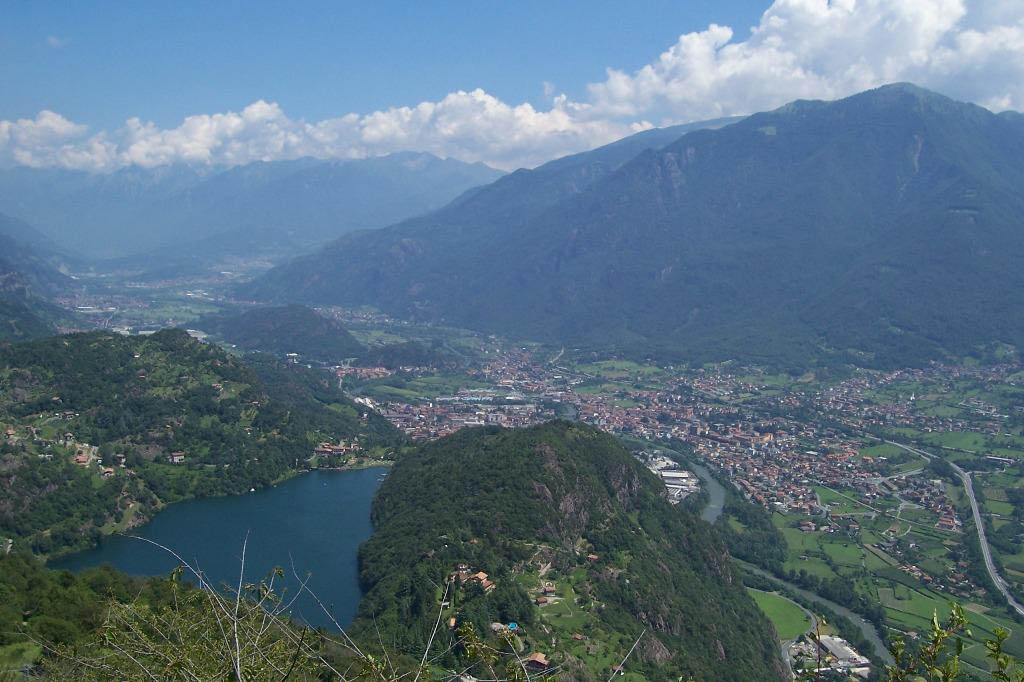
Lake Moro and Darfo Boario Terme

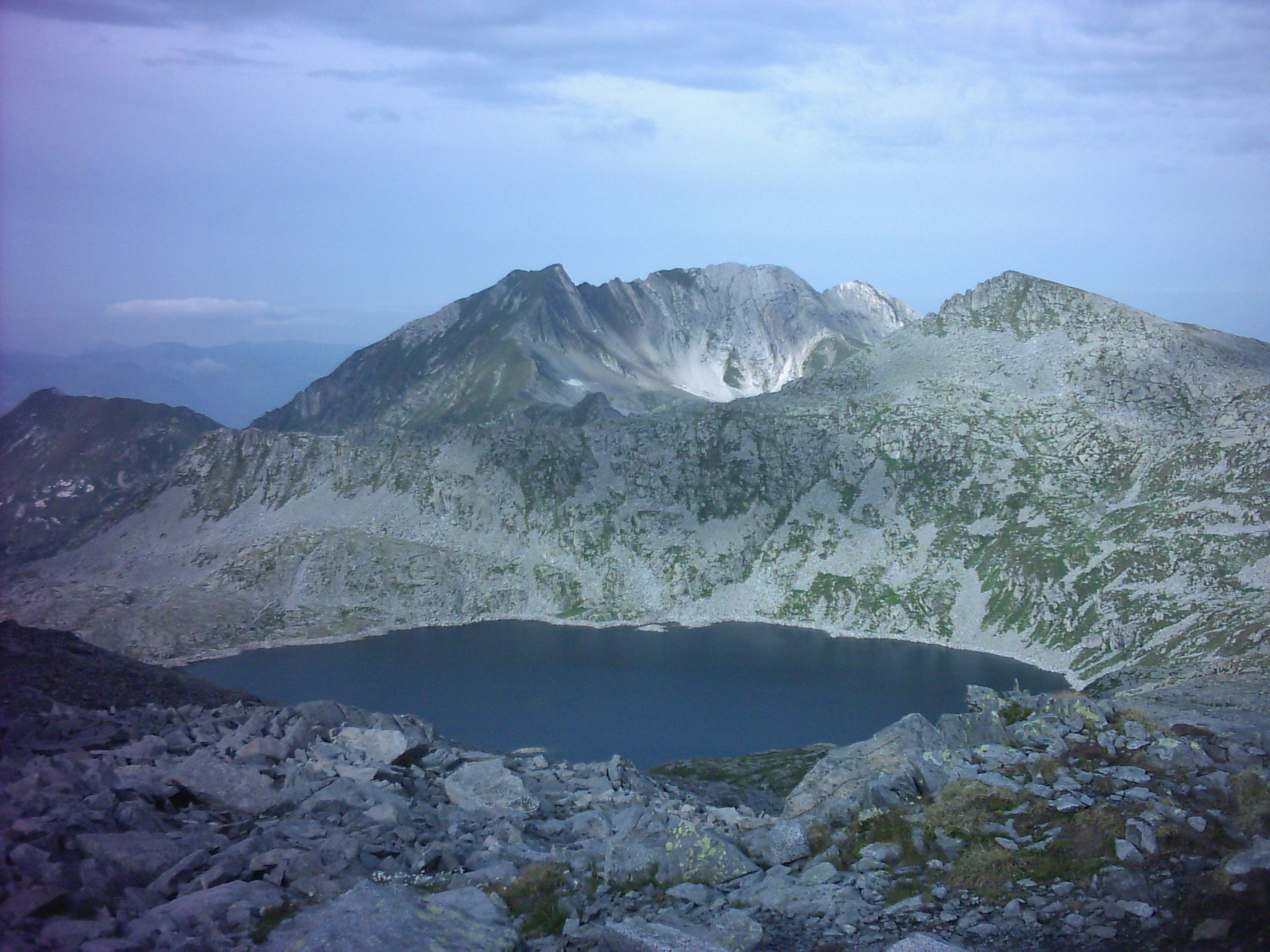
Lago della Vacca

=== Rivers ===
There are about 45 watercourses crossing the territory of the province, but almost all of them are torrents. The only watercourses that can be defined as real rivers are just three: Oglio, Chiese and Mella; divided between the three main valleys.

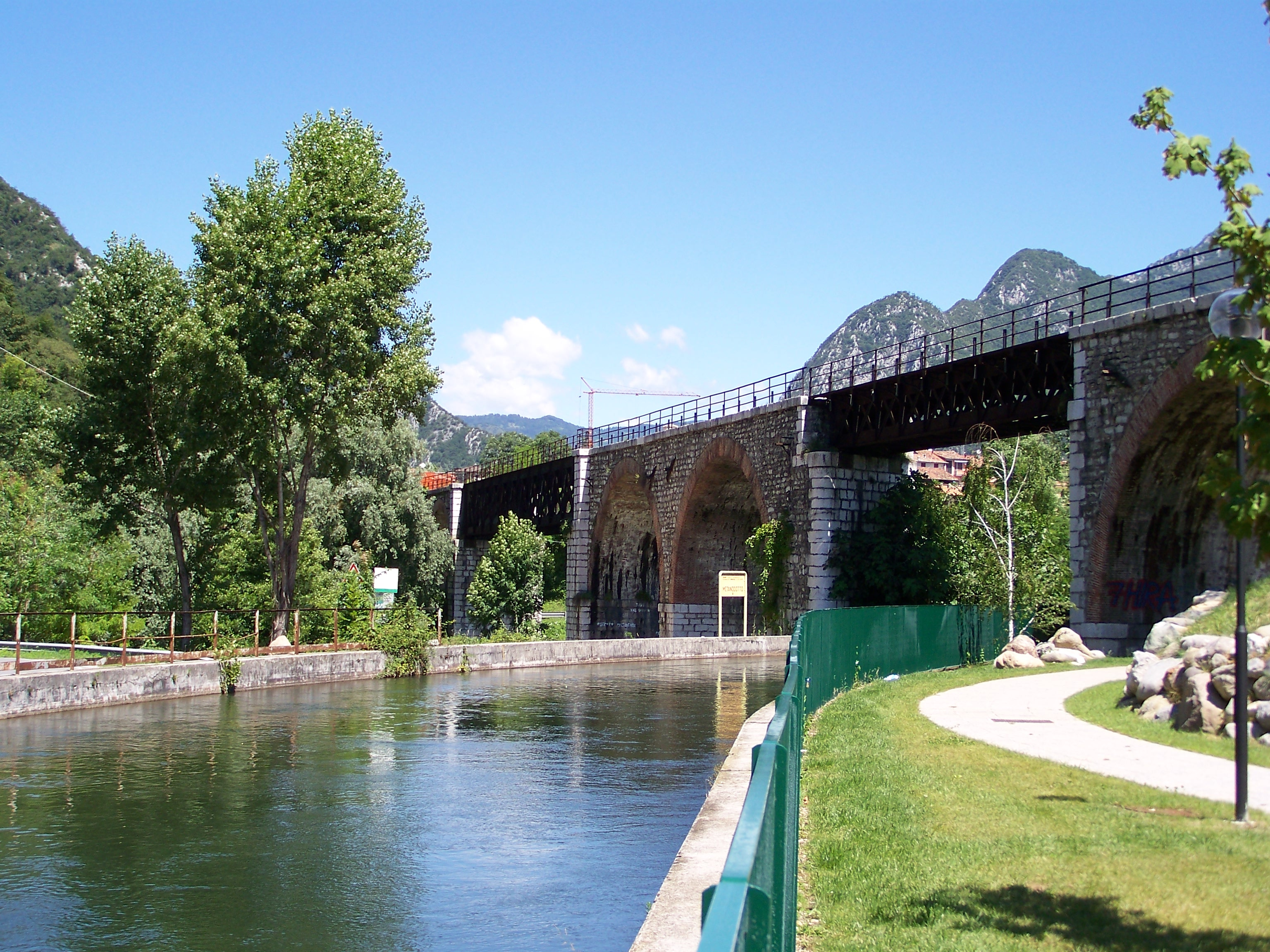
Chiese crosses Valle Sabbia

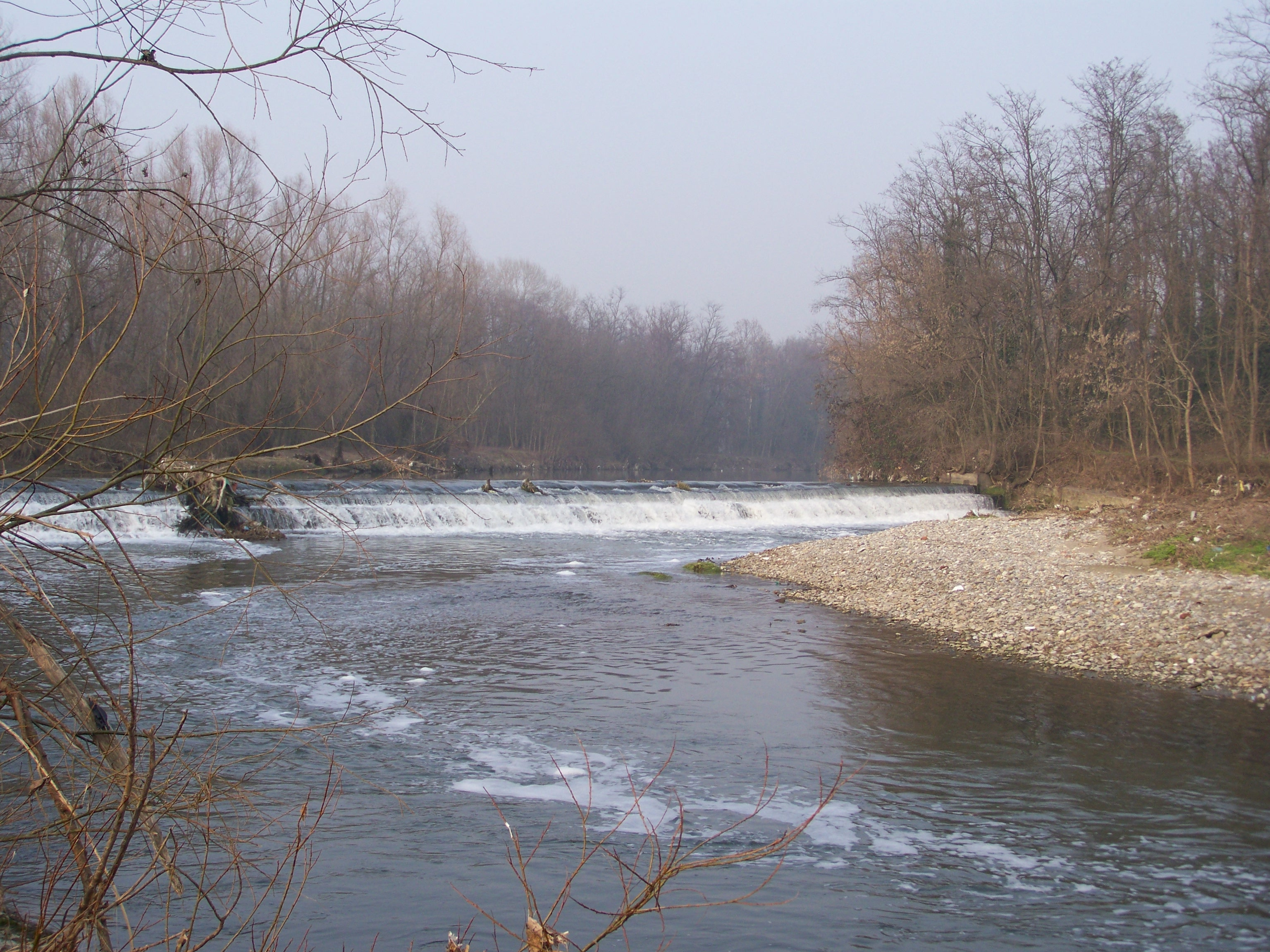
Mella crosses Val Trompia then part of the southern countryside

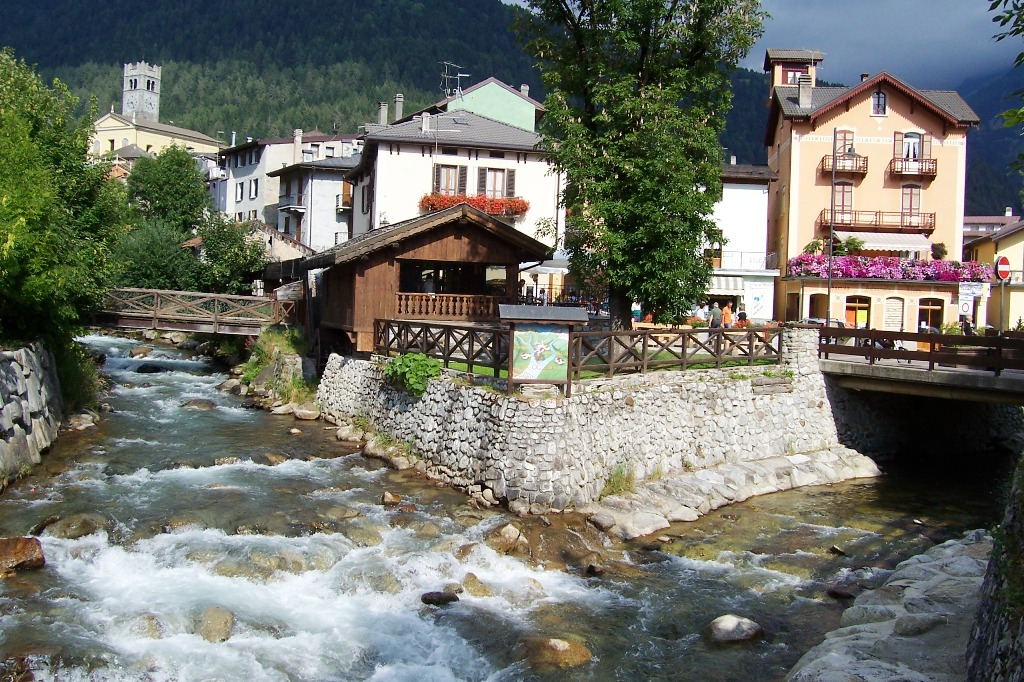
Source of the river Oglio in the upper Valle Camonica

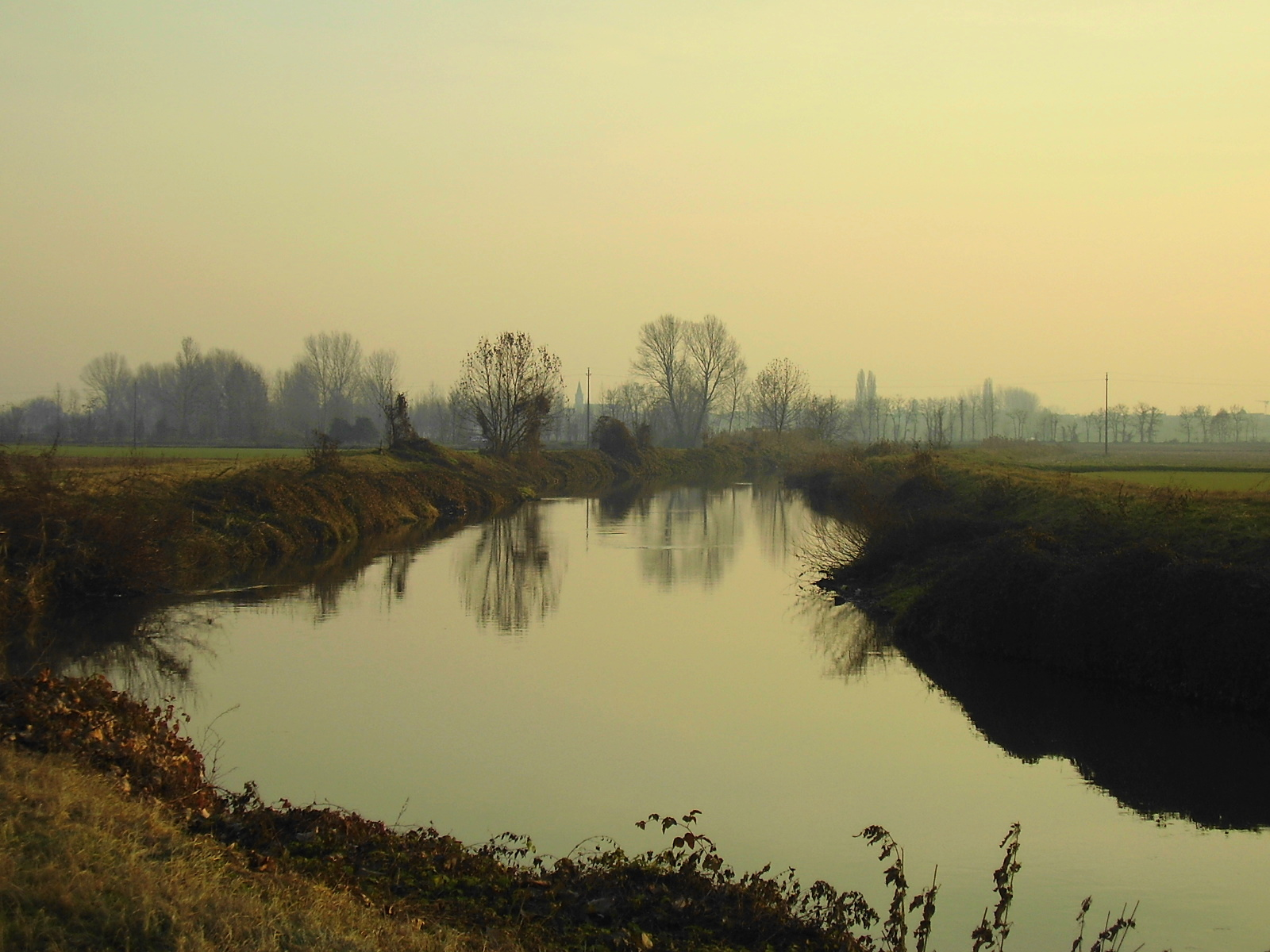
Typical ditch in Bassa Bresciana

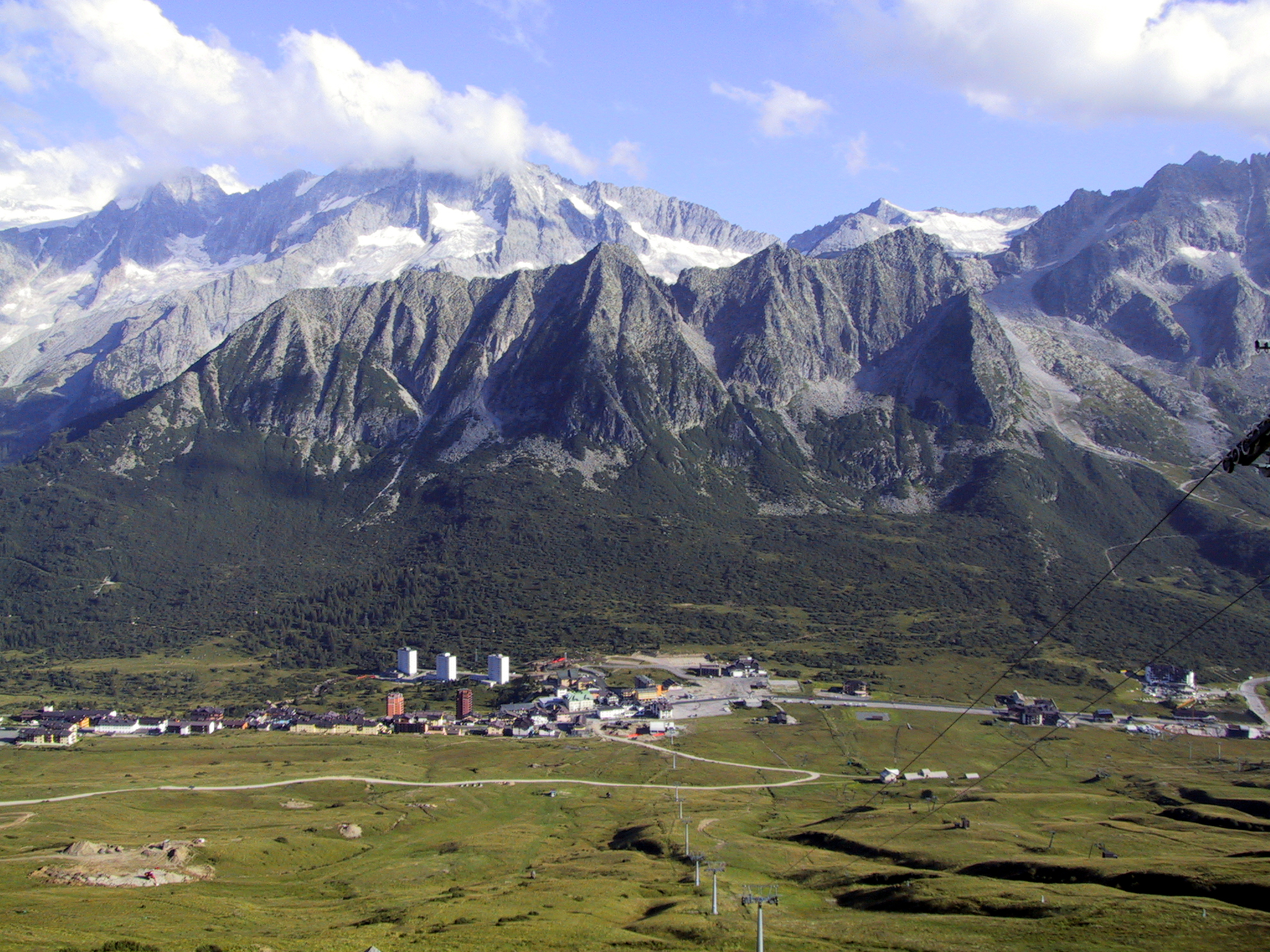
Tonale Pass in summer

=== Extreme points ===
- Highest point: Mount Adamello, Saviore dell'Adamello (3,539 m)
- Highest settlement: Tonale Pass, Ponte di Legno (1,883 m)
- Northernmost municipality: Ponte di Legno
- Southernmost municipality: Fiesse
- Easternmost municipality: Limone sul Garda
- Westernmost municipality: Pontoglio

== Demographics ==
Historical population
Year	Pop.	±%
1861	440,092	—
1871	461,845	+4.9%
1881	475,467	+2.9%
1901	541,765	+13.9%
1911	610,447	+12.7%
1921	662,920	+8.6%
1931	721,890	+8.9%
1936	744,571	+3.1%
1951	858,243	+15.3%
1961	882,949	+2.9%
1971	957,686	+8.5%
1981	1,017,093	+6.2%
1991	1,044,544	+2.7%
2001	1,108,776	+6.1%
2011	1,238,044	+11.7%
2021	1,253,157	+1.2%
Source: ISTAT

As of 2026, the population is 1,271,759, of which 49.8% are male, and 50.2% are female. Minors make up 15.4% of the population, and seniors make up 23.6%.

=== Immigration ===
As of 2025, of the known countries of birth of 1,241,299 residents, the most numerous are: Italy (1,065,005 – 85.8%), Albania (22,815 – 1.8%), India (19,294 – 1.6%), Romania (18,860 – 1.5%), Morocco (17,073 – 1.4%), Pakistan (15,201 – 1.2%), Moldova (10,270 – 0.8%), Senegal (8,557 – 0.7%), Egypt (7,616 – 0.6%).

== Government ==
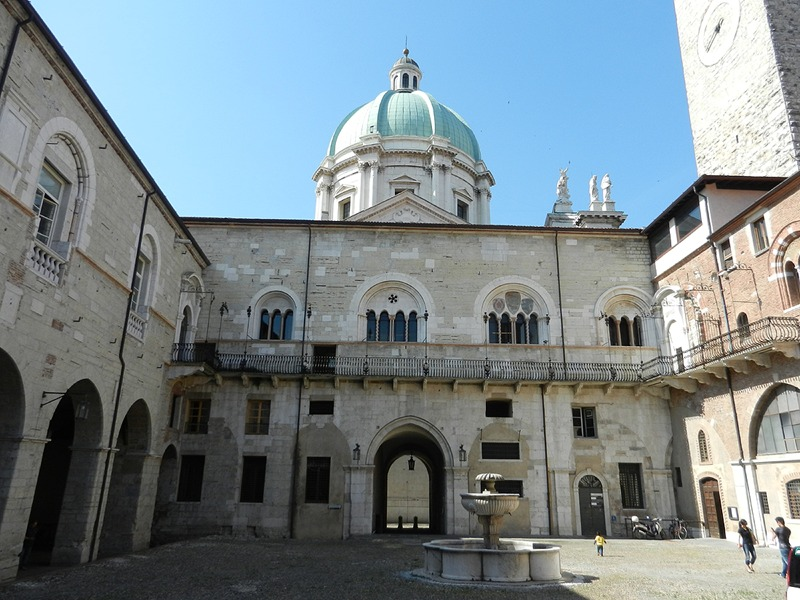
Broletto Palace in Brescia is also the seat of the prefecture

The province of Brescia is an administrative body of intermediate level between a comune (municipality) and Lombardy region.

The three main functions devolved to the province of Brescia are:

- local planning and zoning;
- provision of local police and fire services;
- transportation regulation (car registration, maintenance of local roads, etc.).

As an administrative institution, the province of Brescia has its own elected bodies. From 1945 to 1995 the President of the province of Brescia was chosen by the members of the Provincial Council, elected every five years by citizens. From 1995 to 2014, under provisions of the 1993 local administration reform, the President of the Province was chosen by popular election, originally every four, then every five years.

On 3 April 2014, the Italian Chamber of Deputies gave its final approval to the Law n.56/2014 which involves the transformation of the Italian provinces into "institutional bodies of second level". According to the 2014 reform, each province is headed by a President (or Commissioner) assisted by a legislative body, the Provincial Council, and an executive body, the Provincial Executive. President (Commissioner) and members of Council are elected together by mayors and city councilors of each municipality of the province respectively every four and two years. The Executive is chaired by the President (Commissioner) who appoint others members, called assessori. Since 2015, the President (Commissioner) and other members of the Council do not receive a salary.

In each province, there is also a Prefect (prefetto), a representative of the central government who heads an agency called prefettura-ufficio territoriale del governo. The Questor (questore) is the head of State's Police (Polizia di Stato) in the province and his office is called questura. There is also a province's police force depending from local government, called provincial police (polizia provinciale).

=== List of presidents ===
This is a list of the presidents of the province since 1951:

President	Term start	Term end	Party
Ercoliano Bazoli	28 May 1951	10 May 1970	DC
Mino Martinazzoli	10 May 1970	22 June 1972	DC
Tarcisio Gitti	22 June 1972	15 May 1975	DC
Bruno Boni	15 May 1975	12 June 1985	DC
Vittorio Marniga	12 June 1985	30 November 1987	PSI
Costanzo Valli	30 November 1987	8 May 1995	PSI
Andrea Lepidi	8 May 1995	28 June 1999	PPI
Alberto Cavalli	28 June 1999	8 June 2009	FI
Daniele Molgora	8 June 2009	13 October 2014	LN
Pier Luigi Mottinelli	13 October 2014	2 November 2018	PD
Samuele Alghisi (Note: Mayor of Manerbio.)	2 November 2018	30 January 2023	PD
Emanuele Moraschini (Note: Mayor of Esine.)	30 January 2023	Incumbent	Ind

=== Municipalities ===
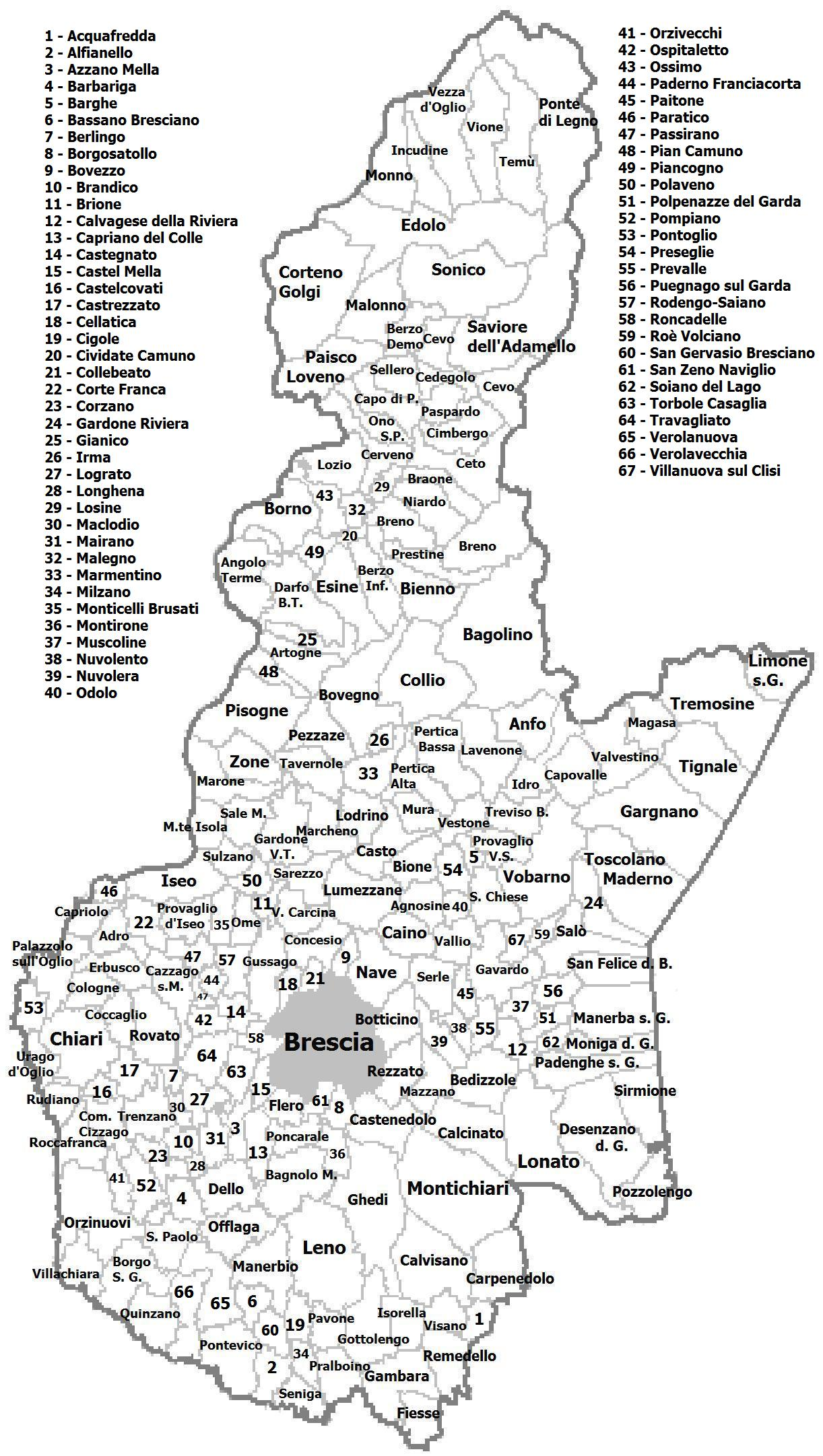
Map showing the 205 municipalities of the province of Brescia

Map showing the zones of the province

The municipalities divided into their geographical zone (municipalities with more than 15,000 inhabitants are in bold) are listed below:

- Capital city area: **Brescia**, Borgosatollo, Botticino, Bovezzo, Collebeato, **Concesio**, **Gussago**, Nave, Rezzato, Roncadelle.
- Franciacorta: **Rovato**, **Palazzolo sull'Oglio**, Adro, Cellatica, Capriolo, Coccaglio, Erbusco, Cazzago San Martino, Passirano, Paderno Franciacorta, Castegnato, Rodengo Saiano, Ome, Monticelli Brusati, Polaveno.
- Lake Iseo: Iseo, Marone, Monte Isola, Paratico, Pisogne, Provaglio d'Iseo, Sale Marasino, Sulzano, Zone.
- Val Camonica: **Darfo Boario Terme**, Angolo Terme, Artogne, Berzo Demo, Berzo Inferiore, Bienno, Borno, Braone, Breno, Capo di Ponte, Cedegolo, Cerveno, Ceto, Cevo, Cimbergo, Cividate Camuno, Corteno Golgi, Edolo, Esine, Gianico, Incudine, Losine, Lozio, Malegno, Malonno, Monno, Niardo, Ono San Pietro, Ossimo, Paisco Loveno, Paspardo, Pian Camuno, Piancogno, Pisogne, Ponte di Legno, Saviore dell'Adamello, Sellero, Sonico, Temù, Vezza d'Oglio, Vione.
- Val Trompia: **Lumezzane**, Sarezzo, Gardone Val Trompia, Villa Carcina, Marcheno, Bovegno, Collio, Caino, Lodrino, Pezzaze, Tavernole sul Mella, Marmentino, Irma.
- Valle Sabbia: Gavardo, Vobarno, Prevalle, Villanuova sul Clisi, Roè Volciano, Vestone, Bagolino, Sabbio Chiese, Serle, Muscoline, Odolo, Paitone, Idro, Casto, Agnosine, Preseglie, Bione, Vallio Terme, Barghe, Provaglio Val Sabbia, Mura, Pertica Bassa, Lavenone, Pertica Alta, Treviso Bresciano, Anfo, Capovalle, Nuvolera, Nuvolento.
- Lake Garda: **Desenzano del Garda**, **Lonato del Garda**, Gardone Riviera, Gargnano, Limone sul Garda, Manerba del Garda, Moniga del Garda, Padenghe sul Garda, Salò, San Felice del Benaco, Sirmione, Tignale, Toscolano Maderno, Tremosine, Soiano del Lago, Polpenazze del Garda, Calvagese della Riviera, Puegnago del Garda, Pozzolengo.
- Bassa Bresciana: **Montichiari**, **Ghedi**, **Chiari**, Acquafredda, Bagnolo Mella, Bedizzole, Mazzano, Calcinato, Calvisano, Carpenedolo, Castenedolo, Fiesse, Flero, Gambara, Gottolengo, Isorella, Leno, Montirone, Poncarale, Remedello, Visano, Berlingo, Castelcovati, Castel Mella, Castrezzato, Comezzano-Cizzago, Maclodio, Orzinuovi, Orzivecchi, Pompiano, Pontoglio, Roccafranca, Rudiano, Travagliato, Trenzano, Urago d'Oglio, Villachiara, Ospitaletto, San Zeno Naviglio, Azzano Mella, Pavone del Mella, Capriano del Colle, Borgo San Giacomo, Cigole, Mairano, Dello, Pralboino, Verolanuova, Verolavecchia, San Gervasio Bresciano, Manerbio, Lograto, Quinzano d'Oglio, Pontevico, Longhena, Offlaga, Barbariga, Berlingo, Torbole Casaglia, Alfianello, San Paolo, Brandico, Seniga.

=== Municipal government ===
Here is a list of the municipal government in cities and towns with more than 15,000 inhabitants:

Municipality	Mayor	Party	Executive	Term
Brescia	Laura Castelletti	Ind	PD • SI • A • EV	2023–2028
Desenzano del Garda	Guido Malinverno	FI	FI • Lega • FdI	2022–2027
Montichiari	Marco Togni	Lega	FI • Lega • FdI	2024–2029
Lumezzane	Josehf Facchini	Lega	FI • Lega • FdI	2024–2029
Palazzolo sull'Oglio	Gianmarco Cossandi	PD	PD • Ind	2022–2027
Rovato	Tiziano Belotti	Lega	FI • Lega • FdI	2020–2026
Chiari	Gabriele Zotti	Lega	FI • Lega • FdI	2024–2029
Ghedi	Federico Casali	Lega	FI • Lega • FdI	2024–2029
Gussago	Giovanni Coccoli	Ind	Ind	2022–2027
Lonato del Garda	Roberto Tardani	FI	FI • Lega • FdI	2020–2026
Concesio	Agostino Damiolini	Lega	FI • Lega • FdI	2024–2029
Darfo Boario Terme	Dario Colossi	Ind	Ind	2022–2027

=== Gallery ===
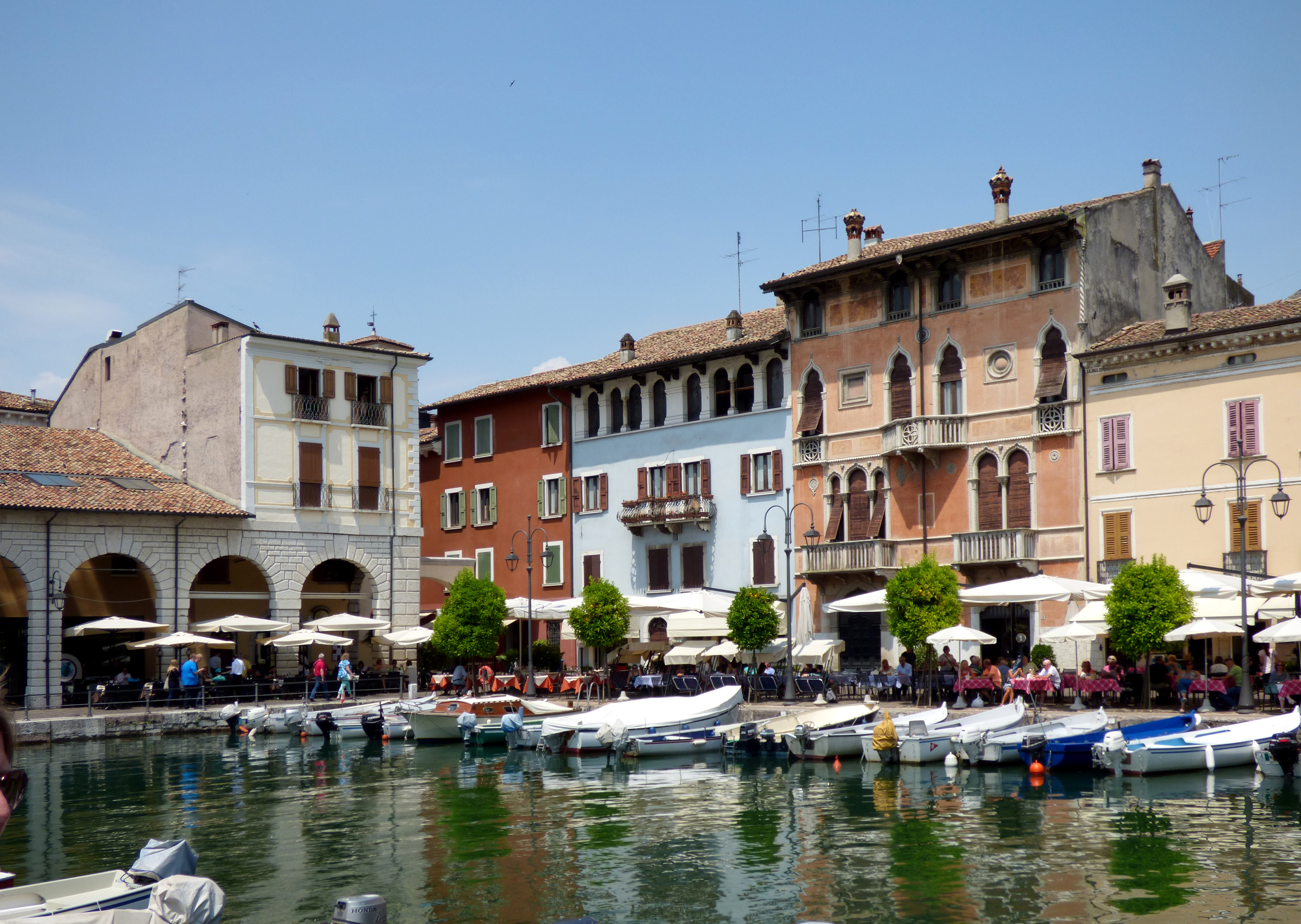
Desenzano del Garda

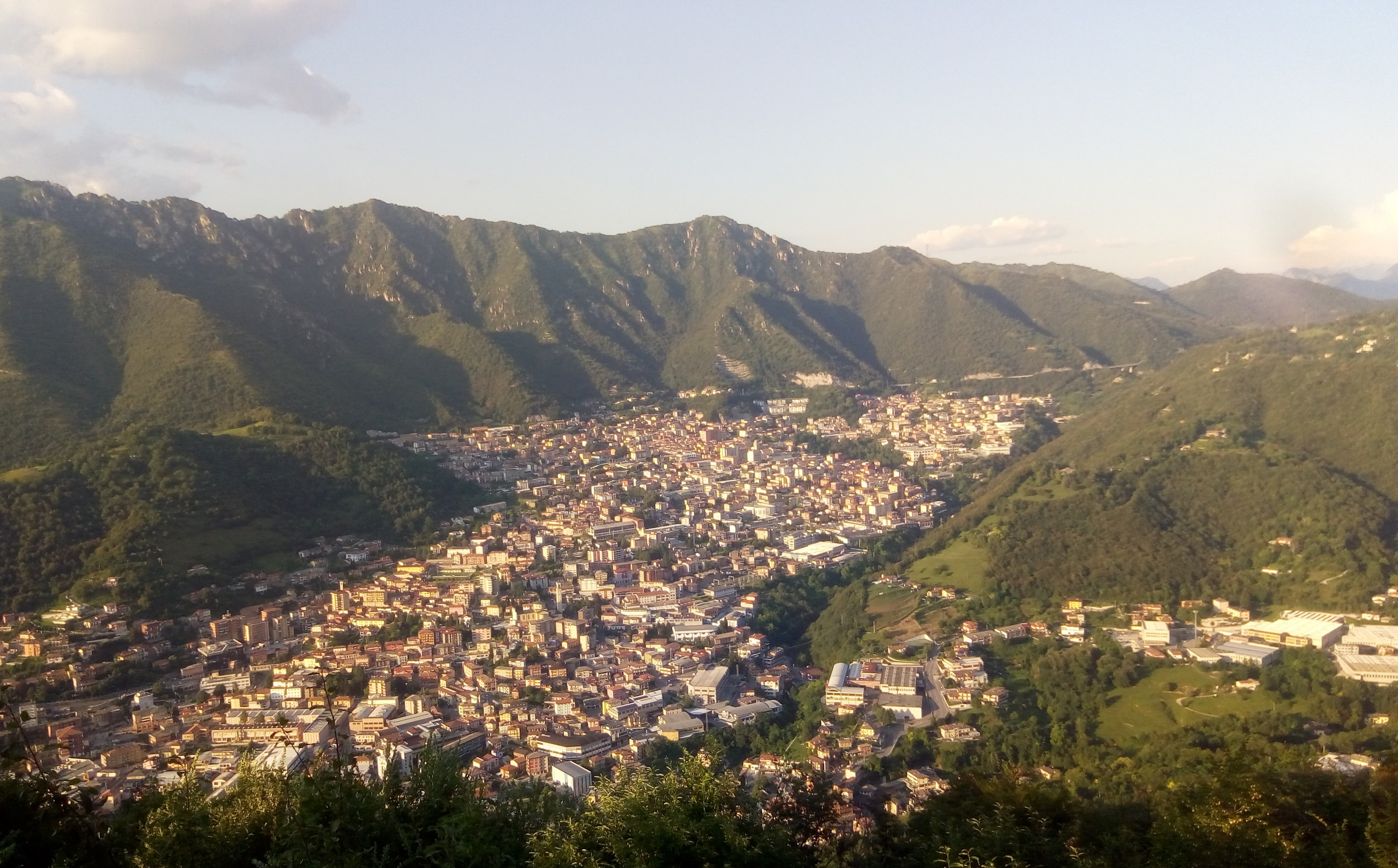
Lumezzane

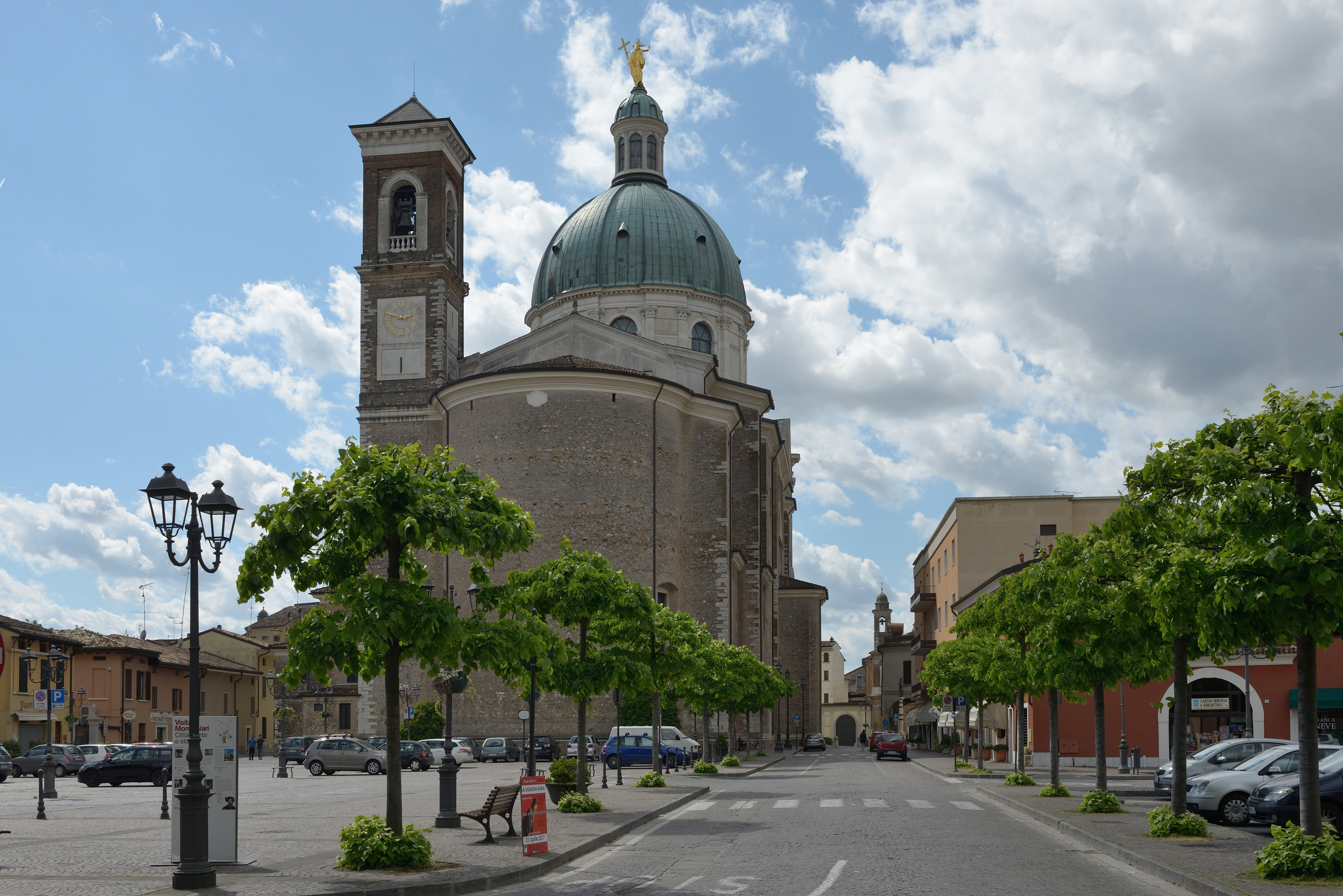
Montichiari

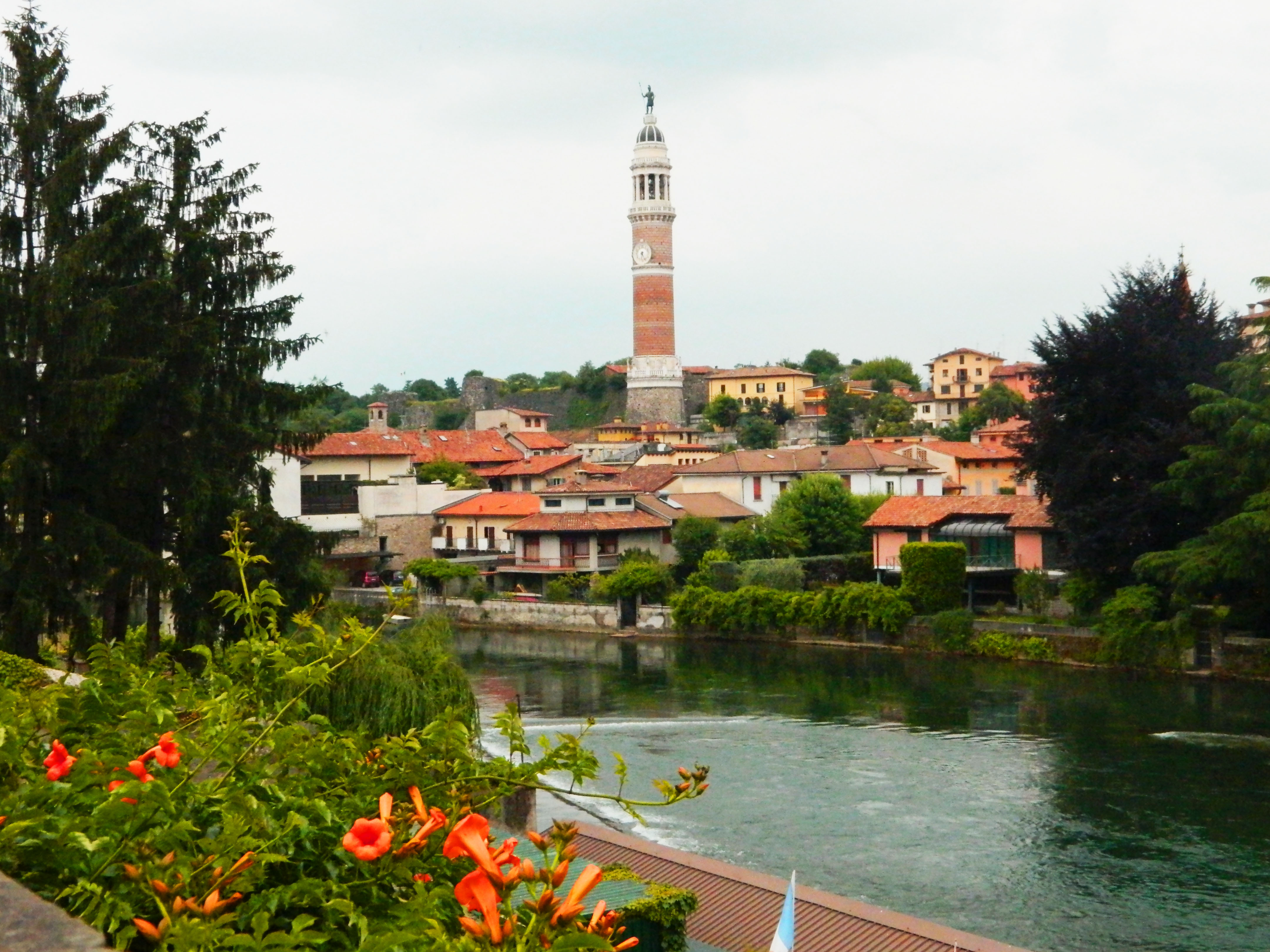
Palazzolo sull'Oglio

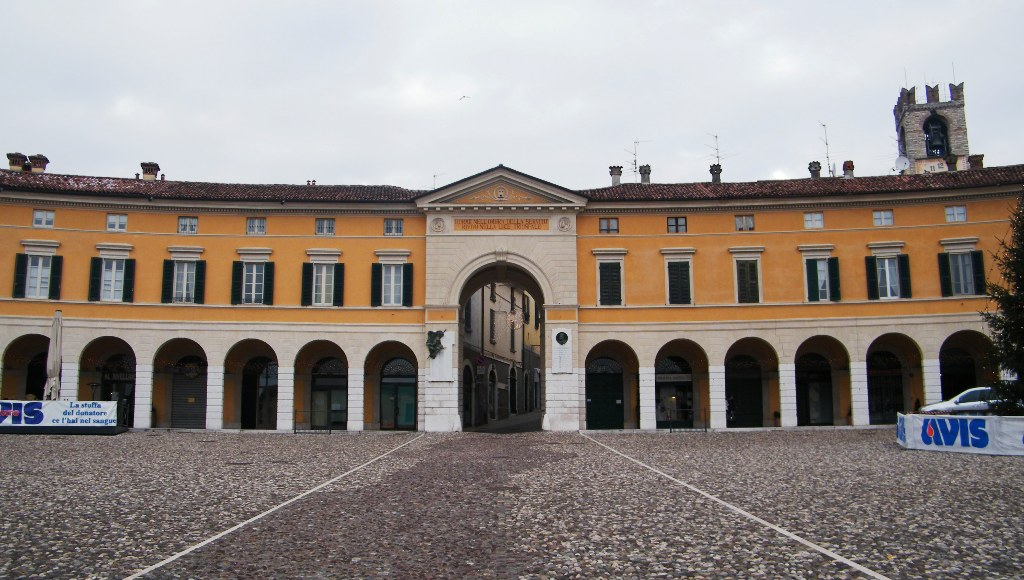
Rovato

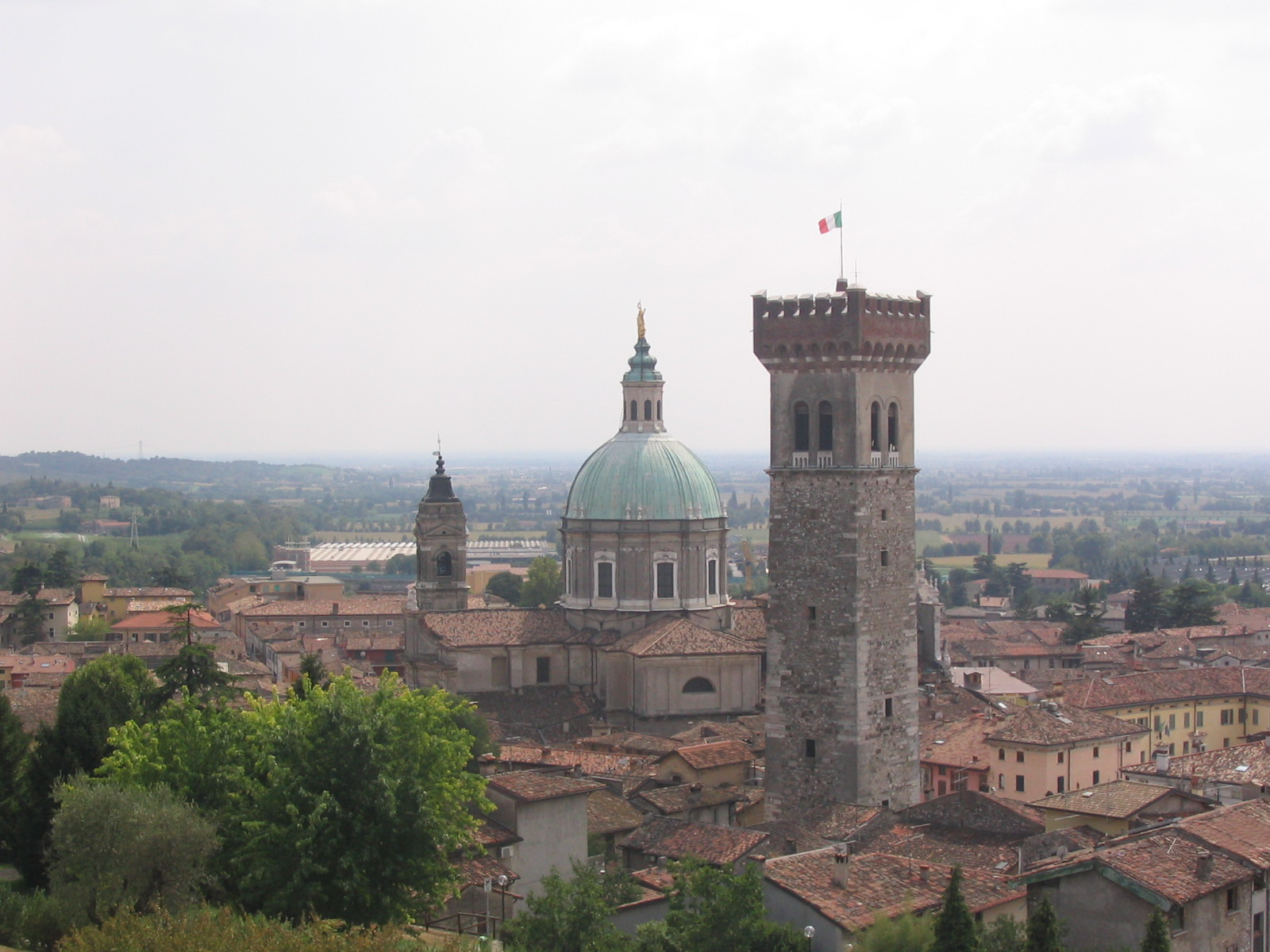
Lonato del Garda
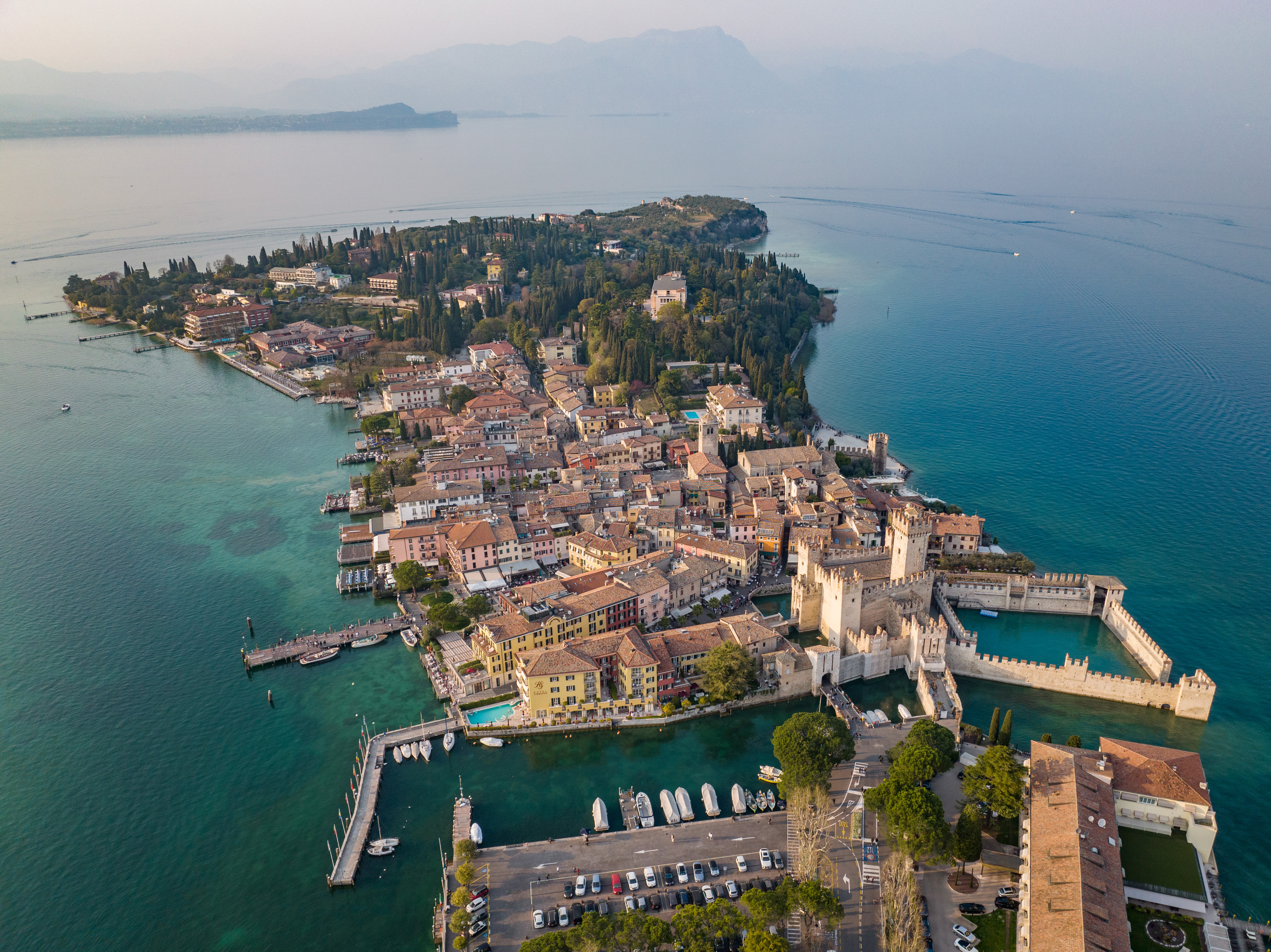
Sirmione

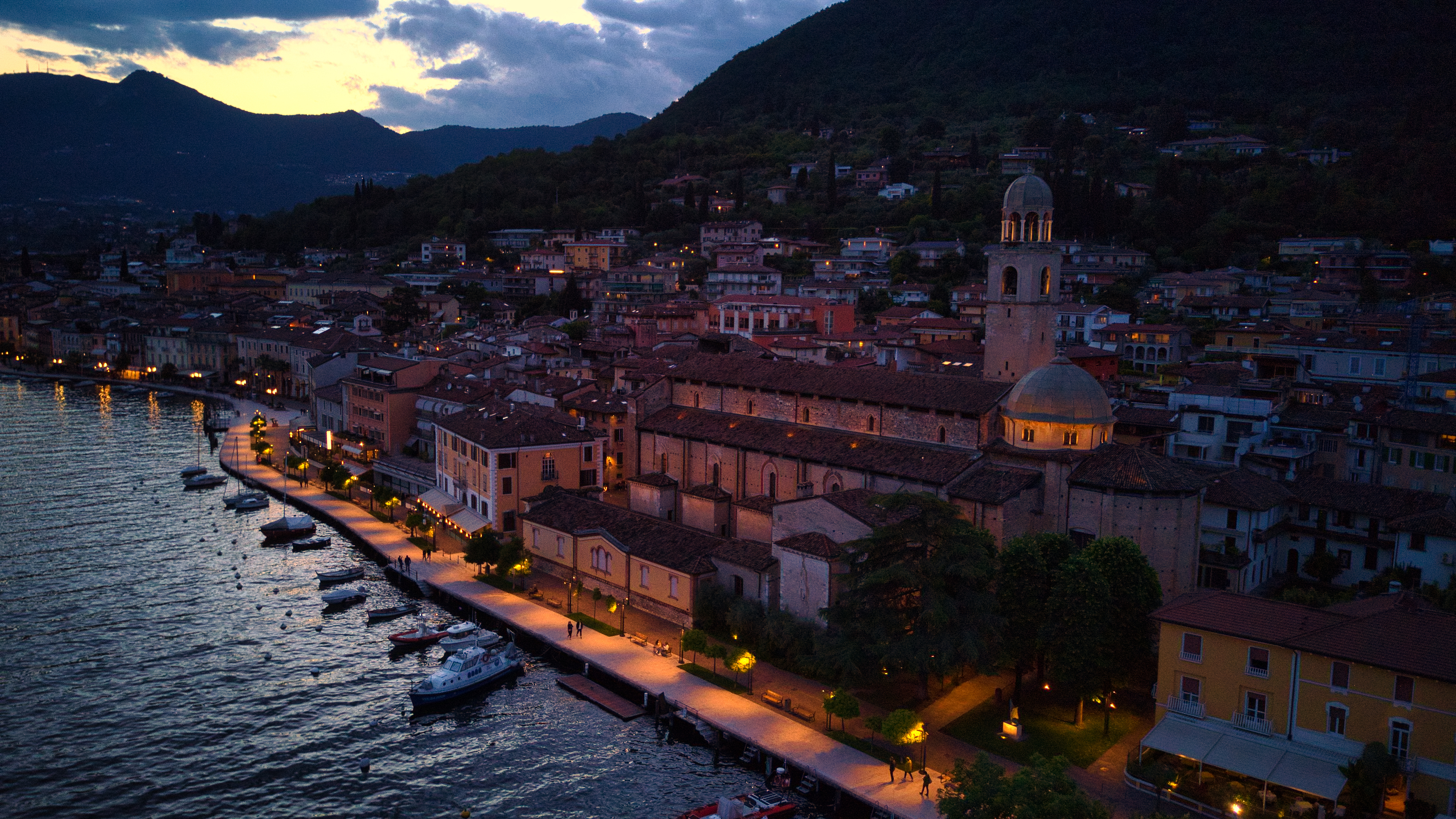
Salò

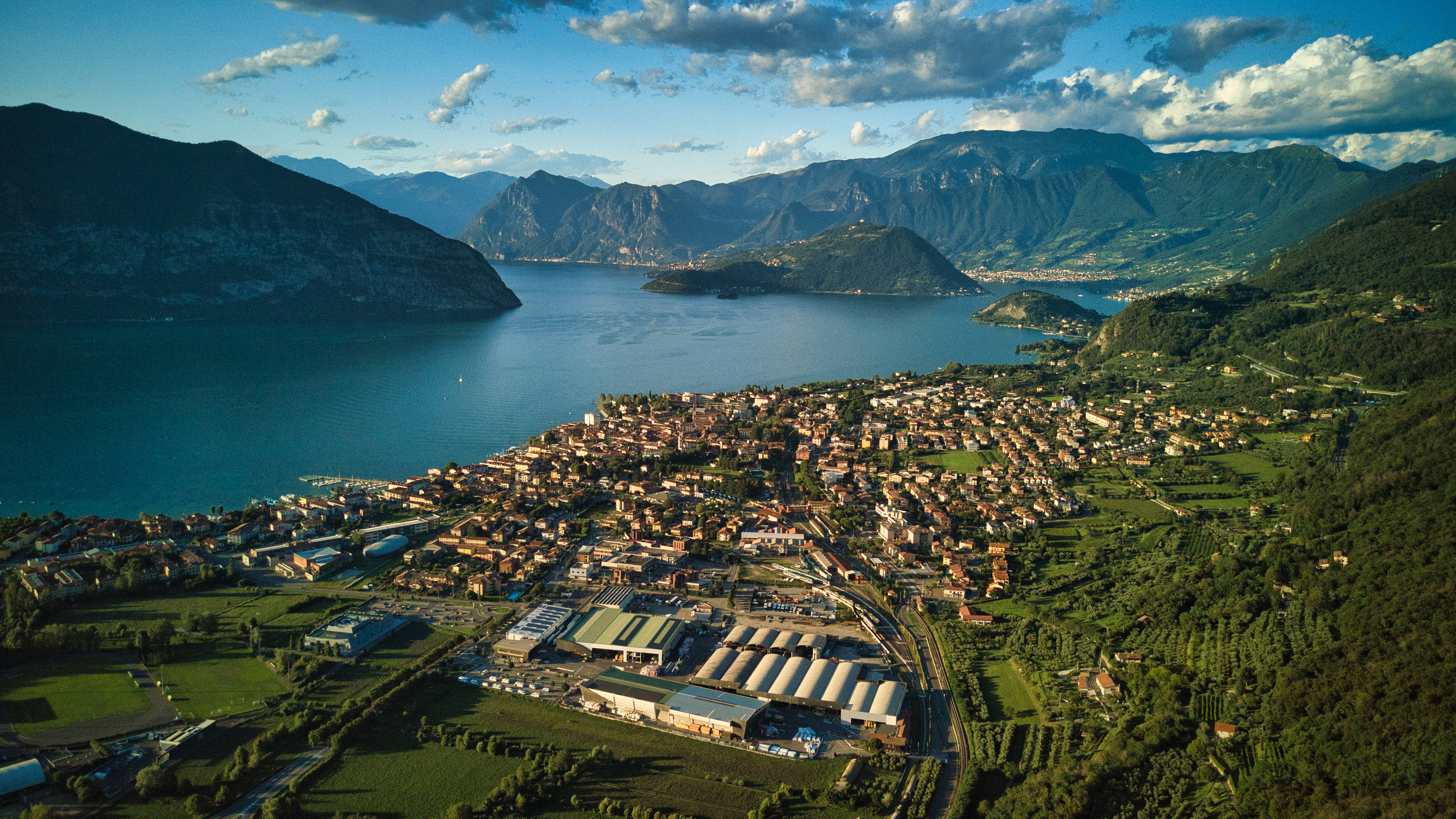
Iseo

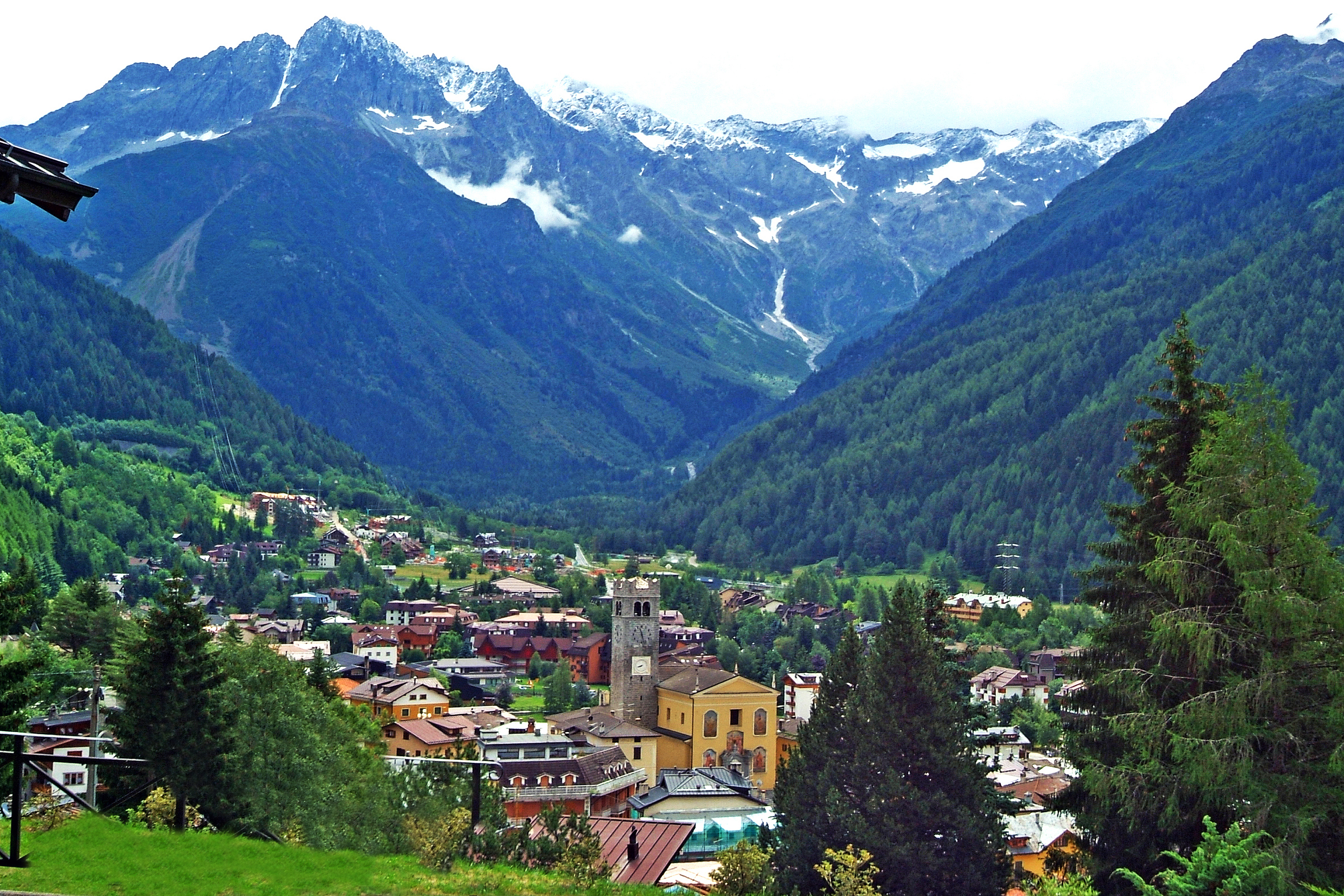
Ponte di Legno

== Main sights ==
=== UNESCO World Heritage Sites ===
World Heritage Sites in the province of Brescia

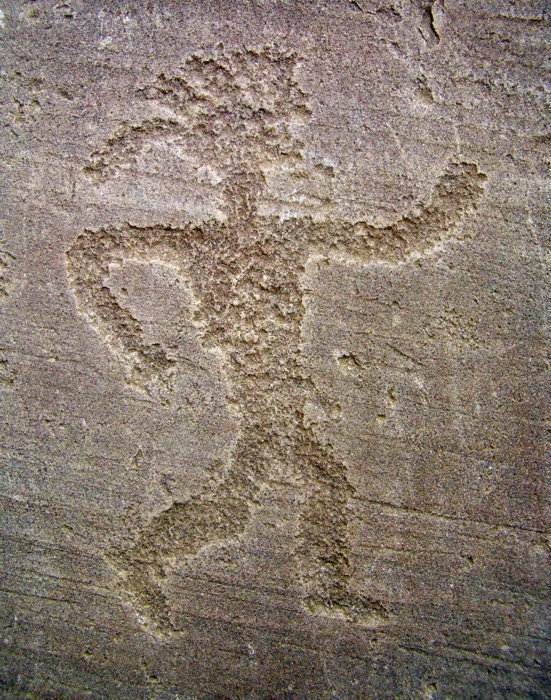
Rock Drawings in Valcamonica

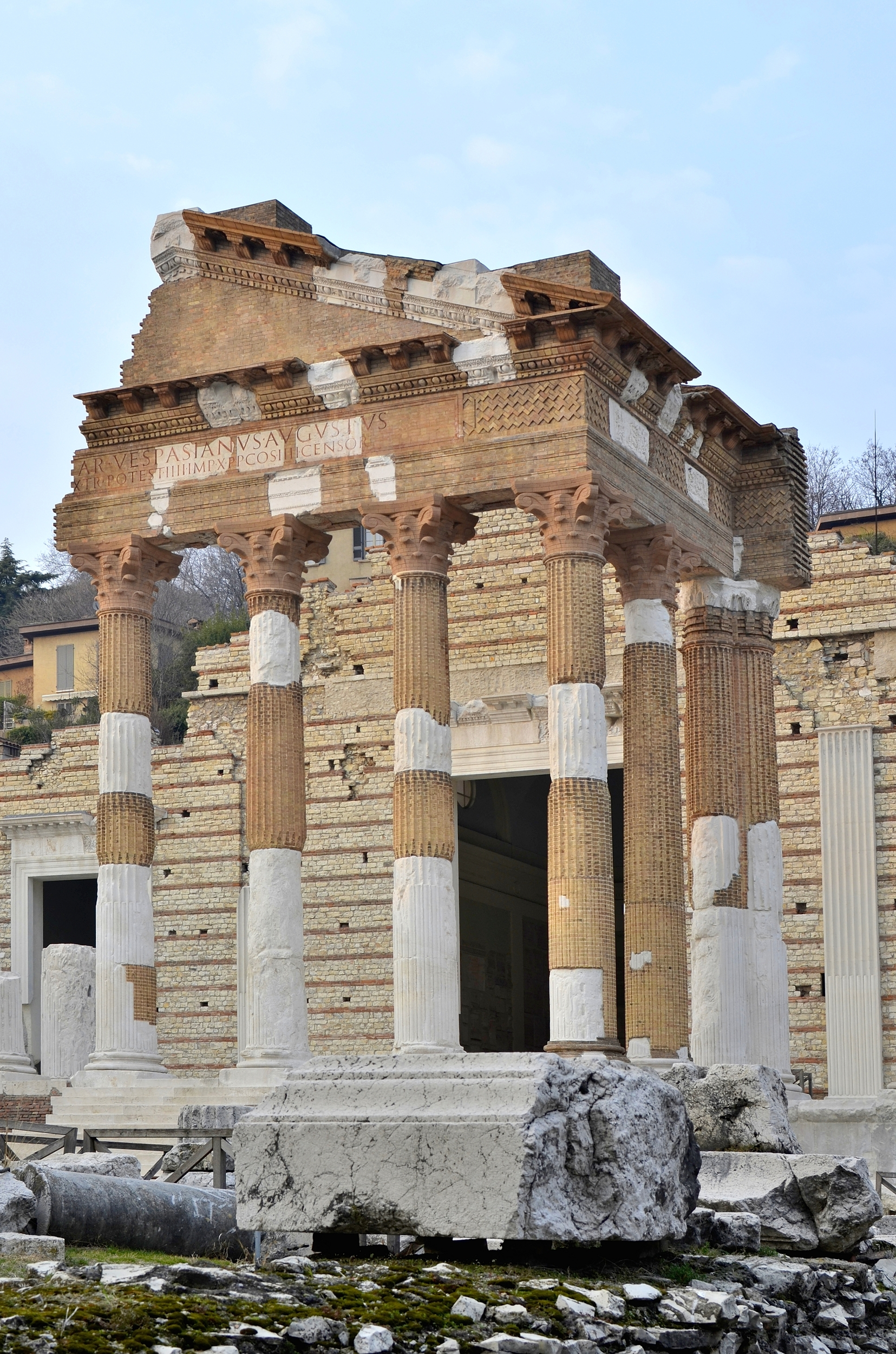
Brescia

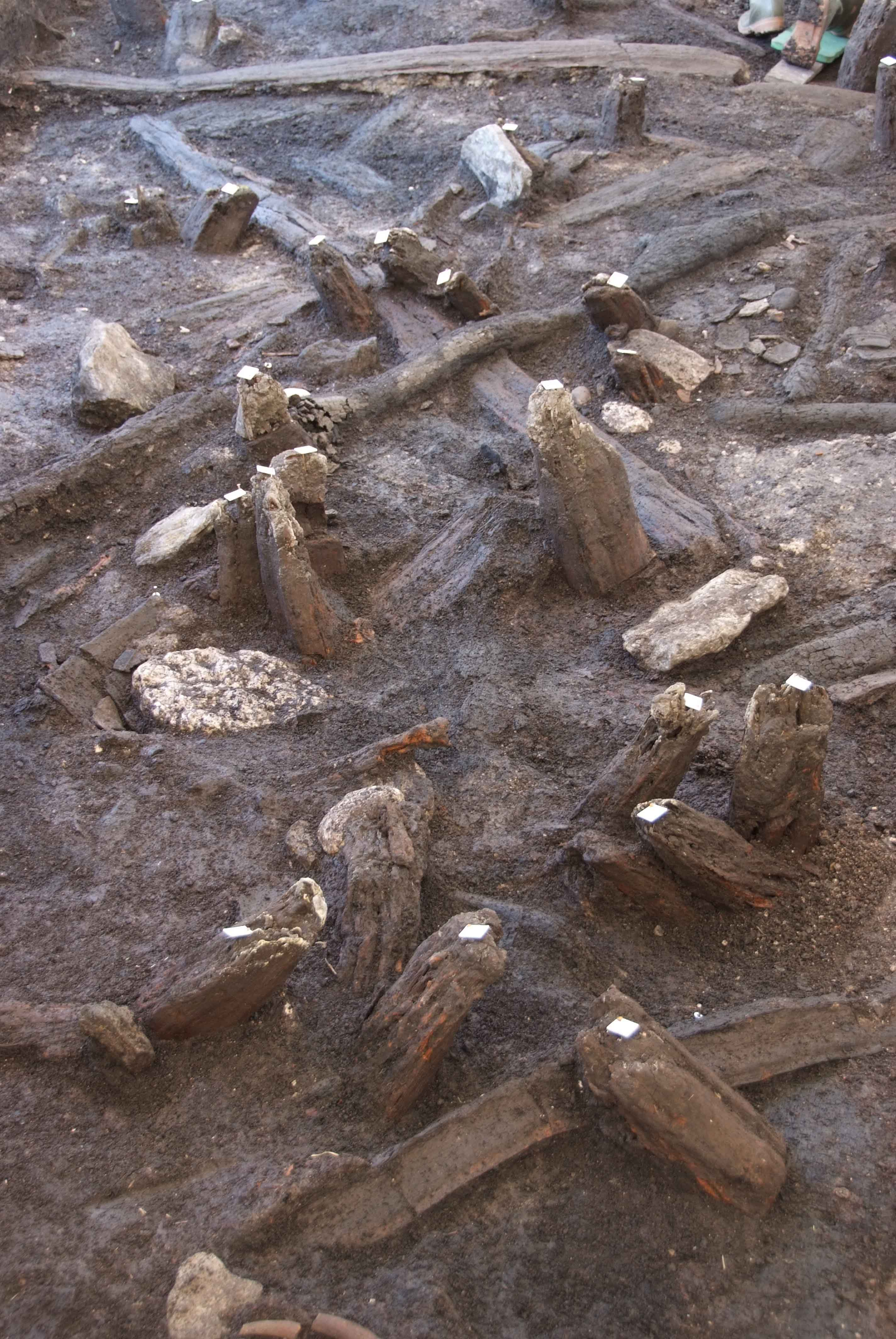
Prehistoric settlements around the Alps

- Rock Drawings in Valcamonica;
- Brescia, one of the places of Longobard power;
- Prehistoric settlements of Lavagnone (Desenzano del Garda), Lugana Vecchia (Sirmione), Lucone (Polpenazze del Garda), San Sivino and Gabbiano (Manerba del Garda).

=== Castles and fortress ===
There are many castles and fortress located in:

- Brescia
- Sirmione
- Lonato
- Montichiari
- Desenzano
- Breno
- Anfo
- Padenghe sul Garda
- Moniga del Garda
- Padernello
- Pozzolengo
- Carzago
- Bornato
- Drugolo
- Pontevico
- Paderno Franciacorta
- Soiano del Lago
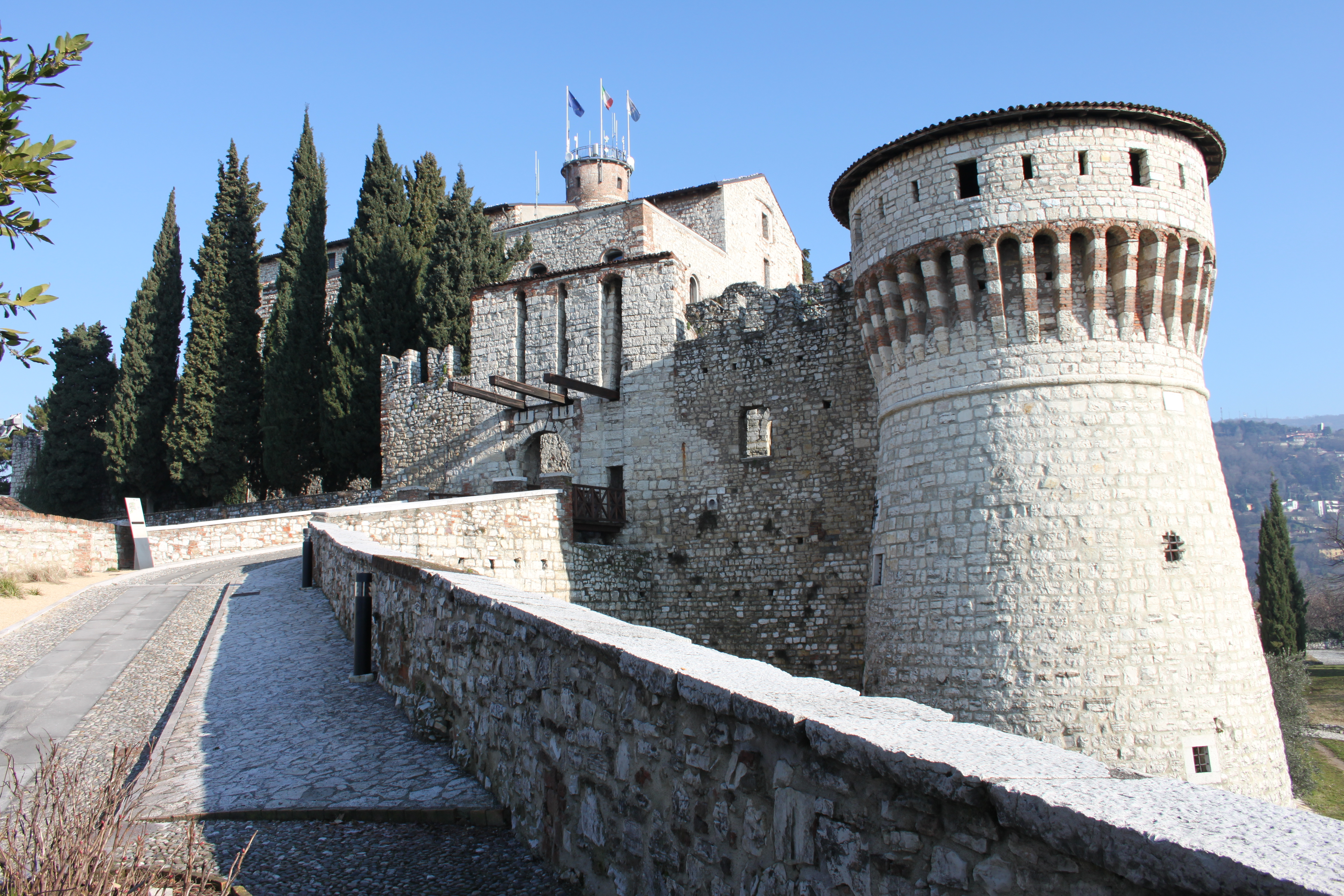
Brescia

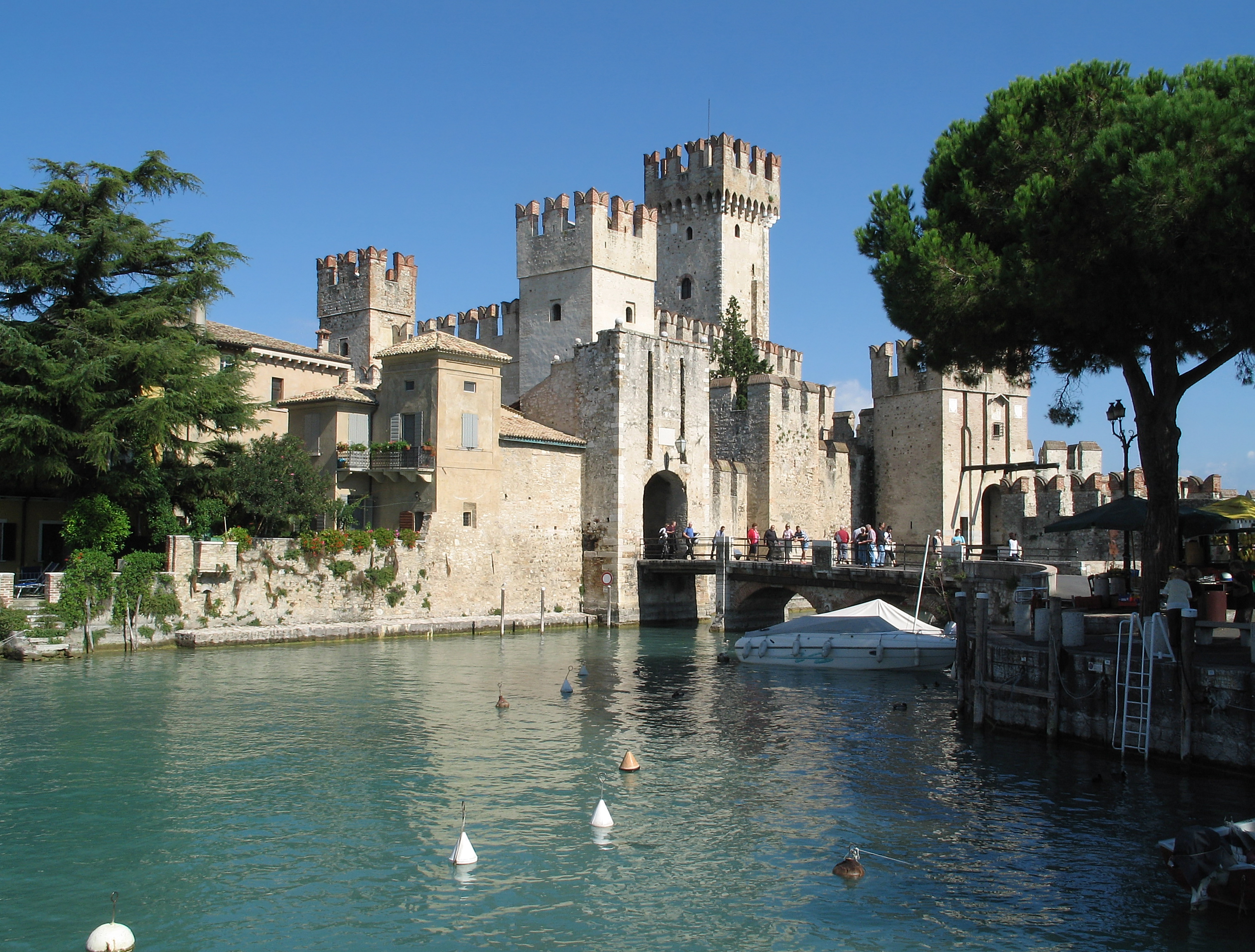
Sirmione

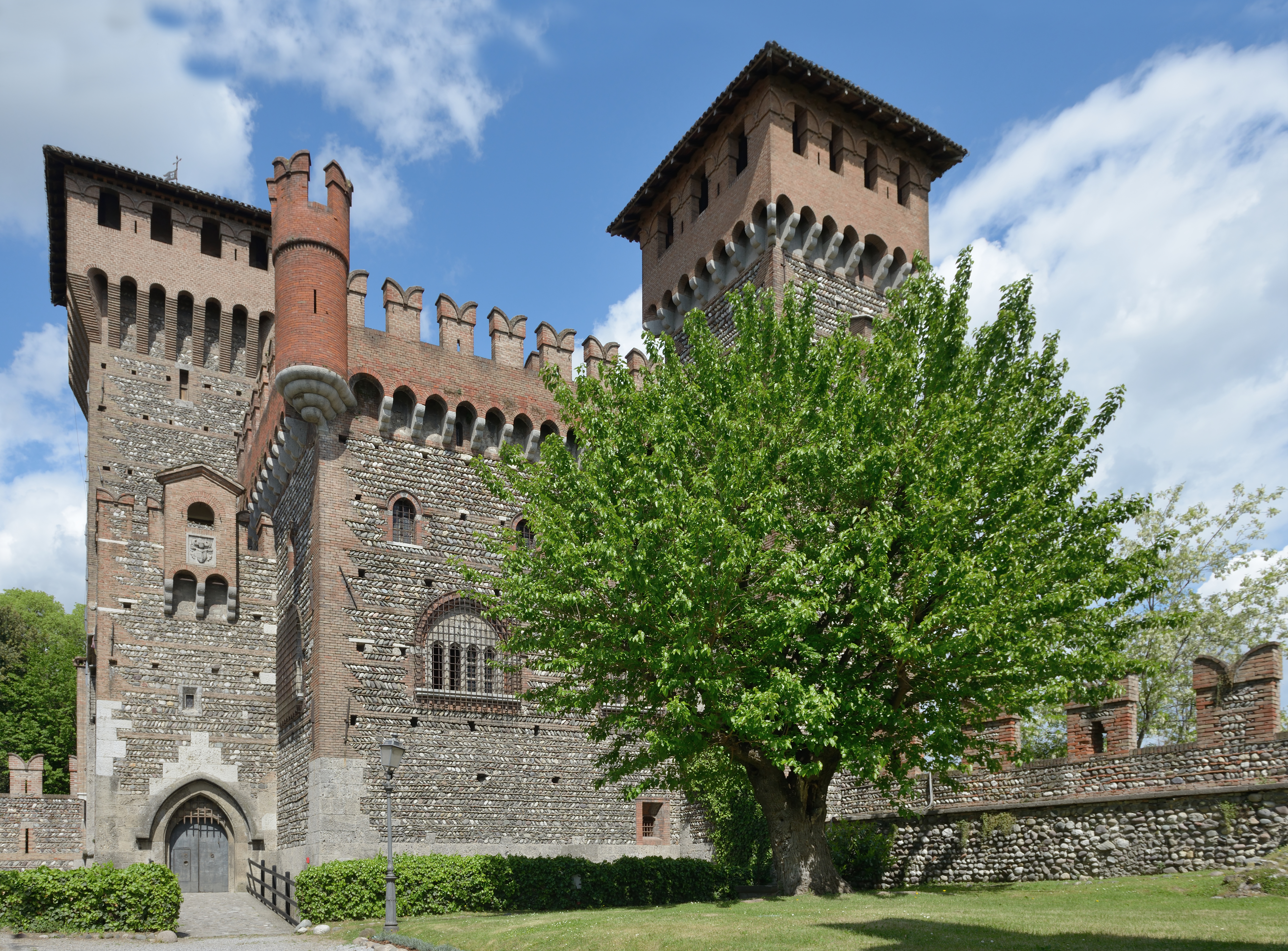
Montichiari

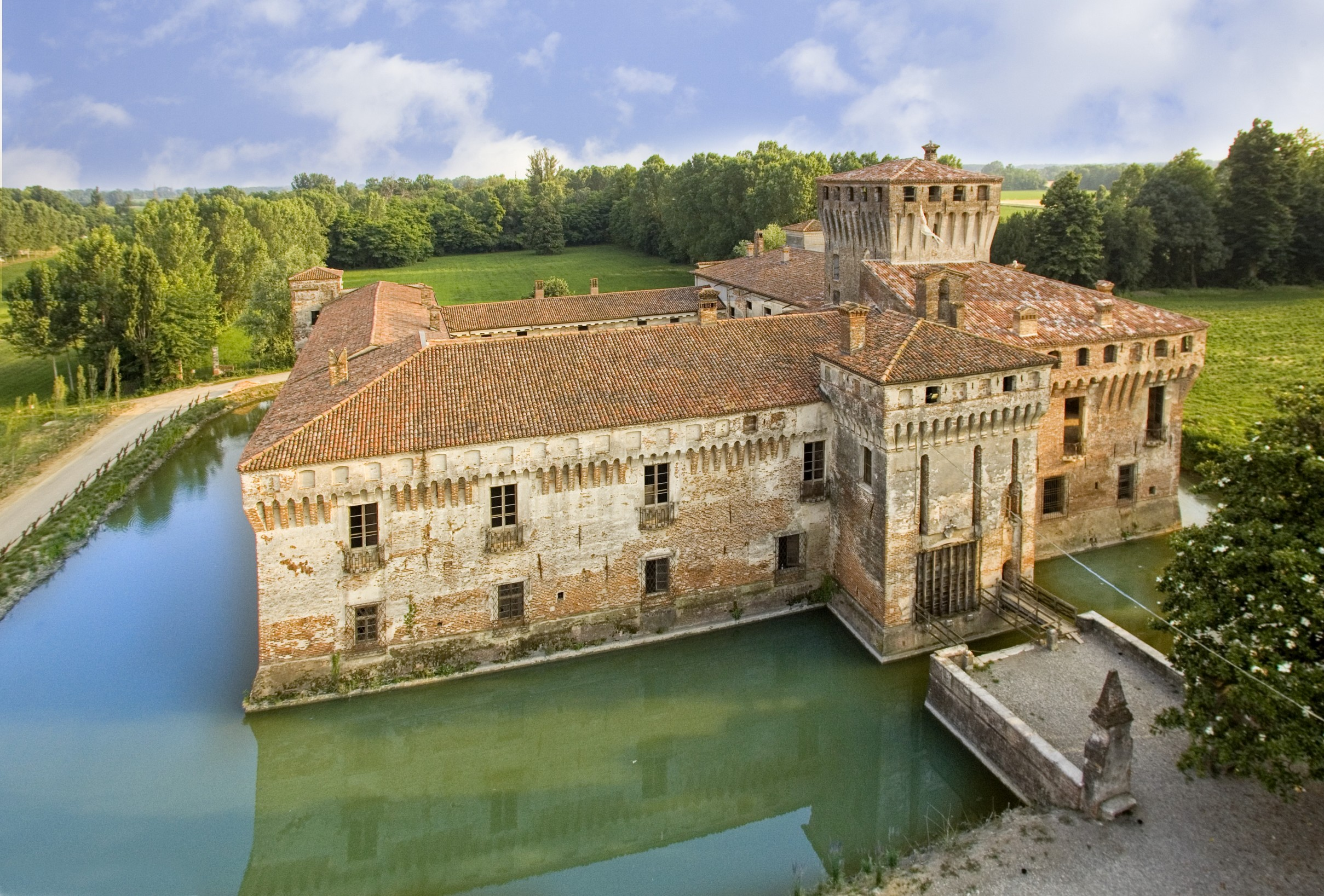
Padernello

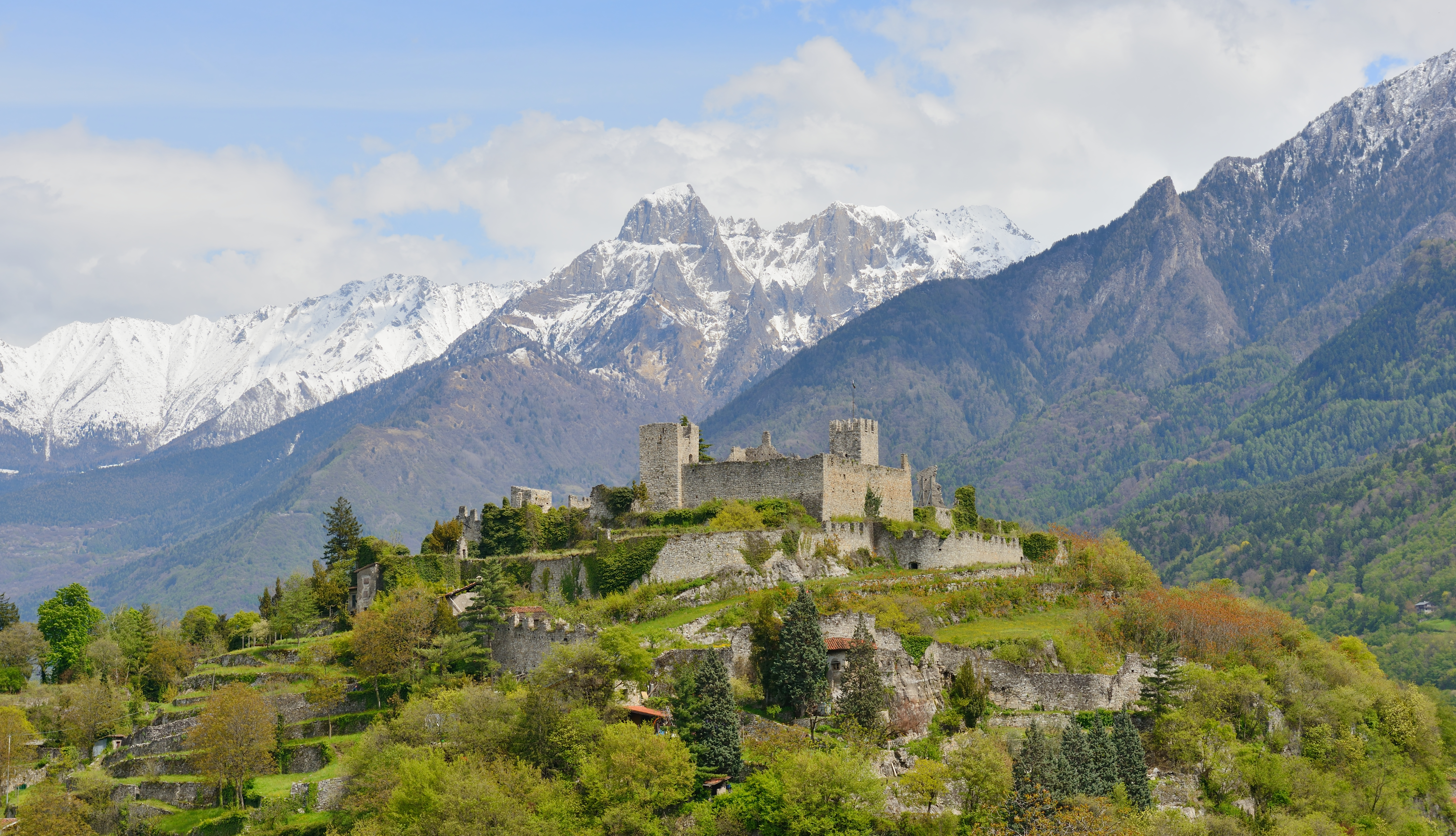
Breno

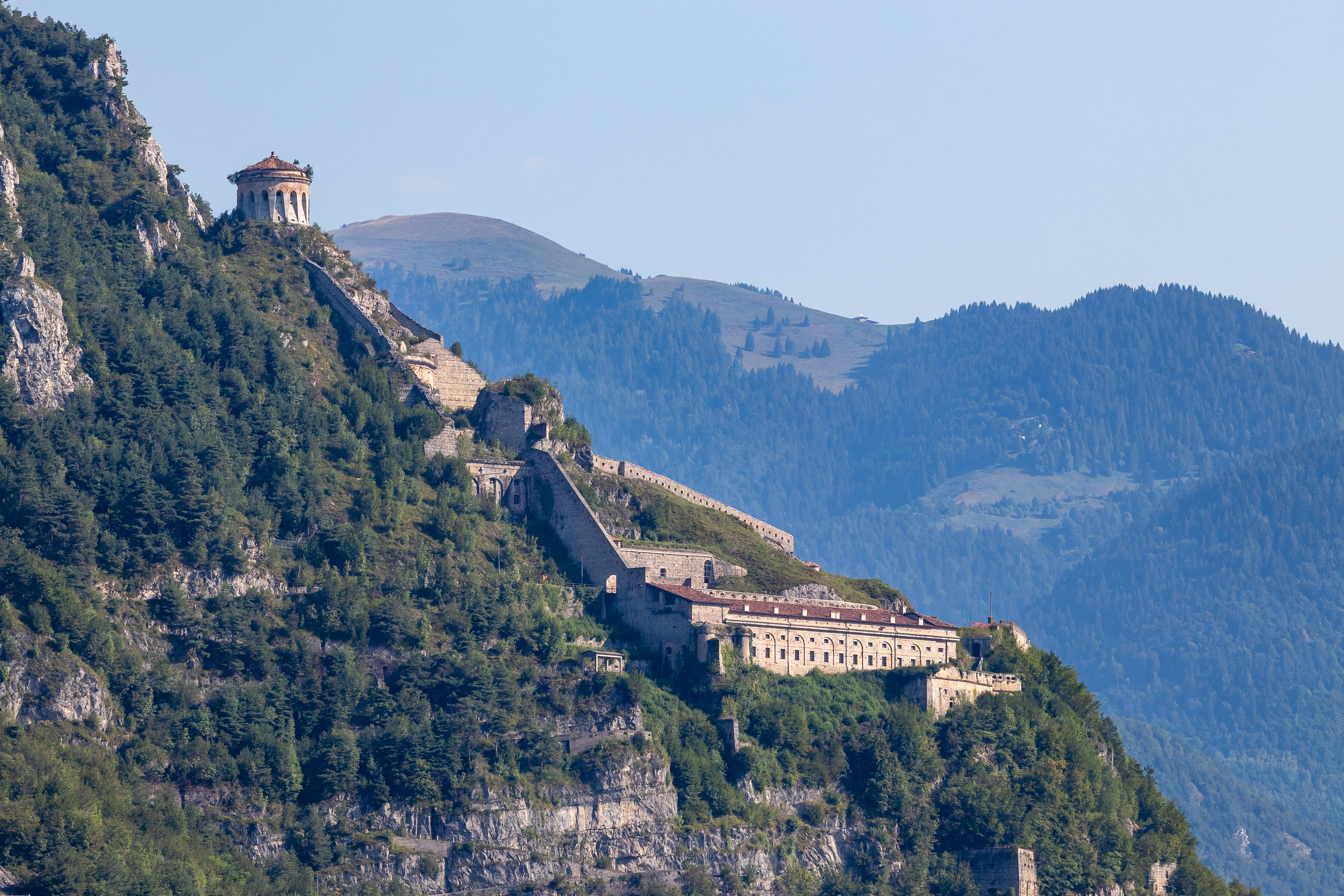
Anfo
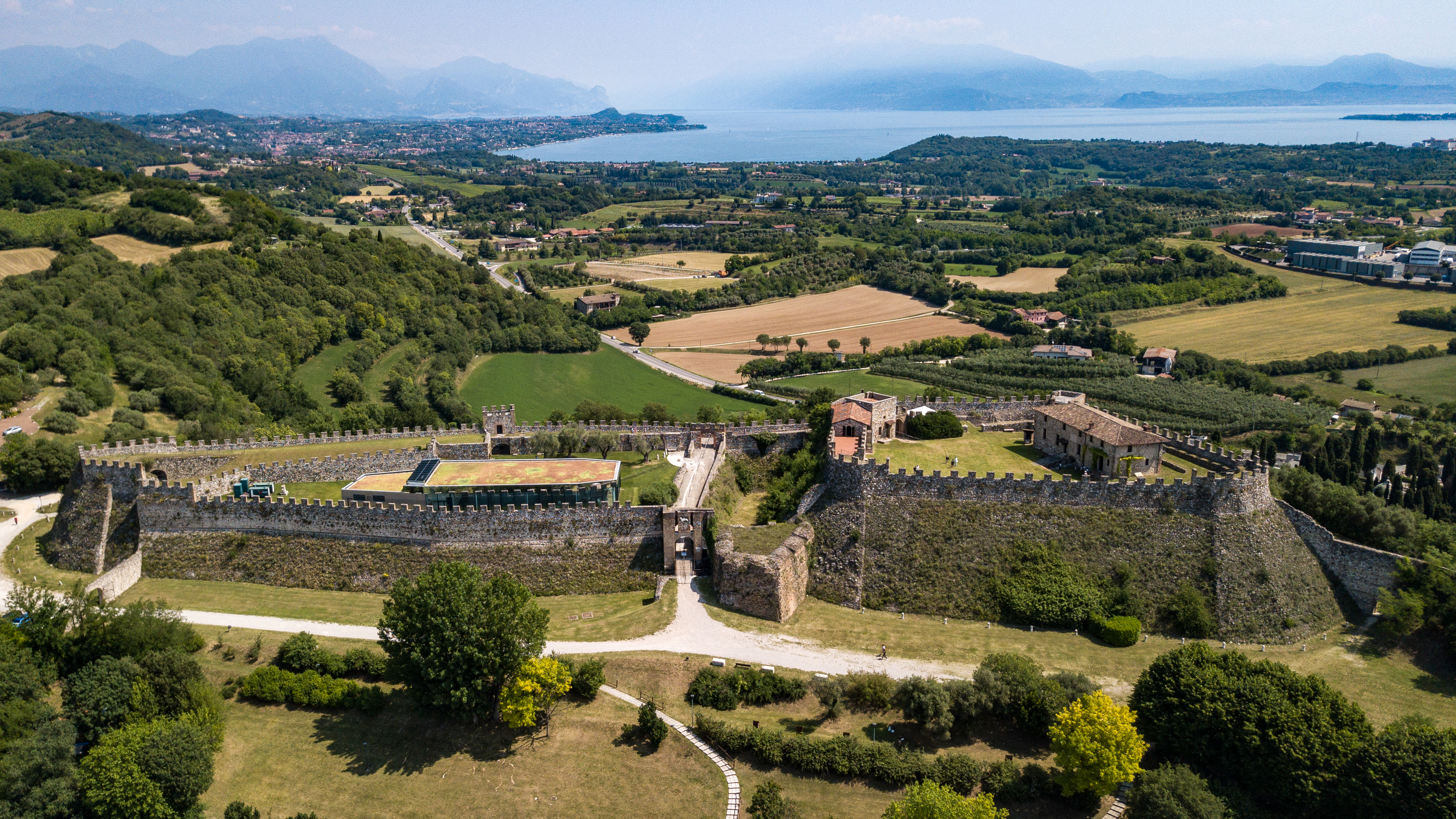
Lonato

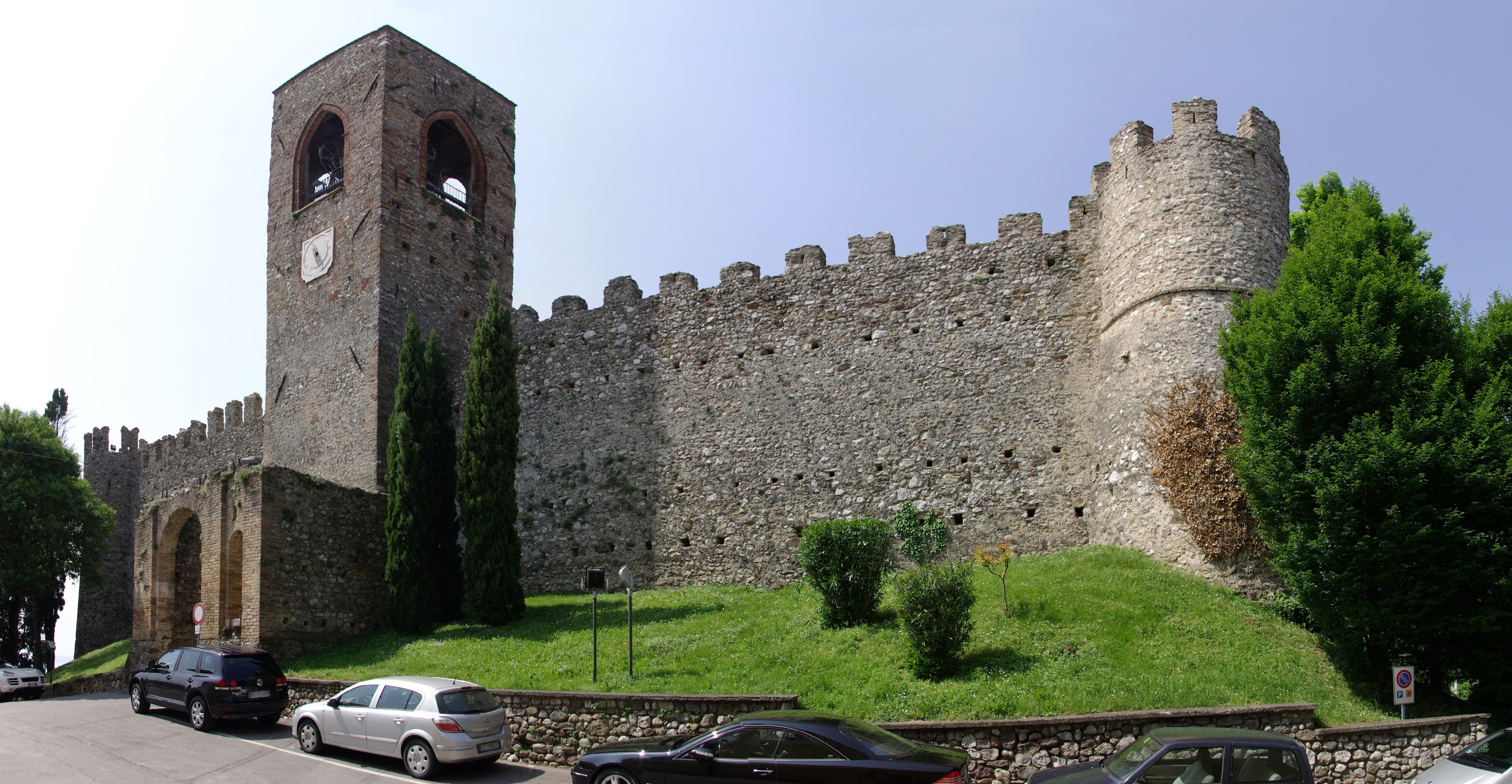
Moniga del Garda

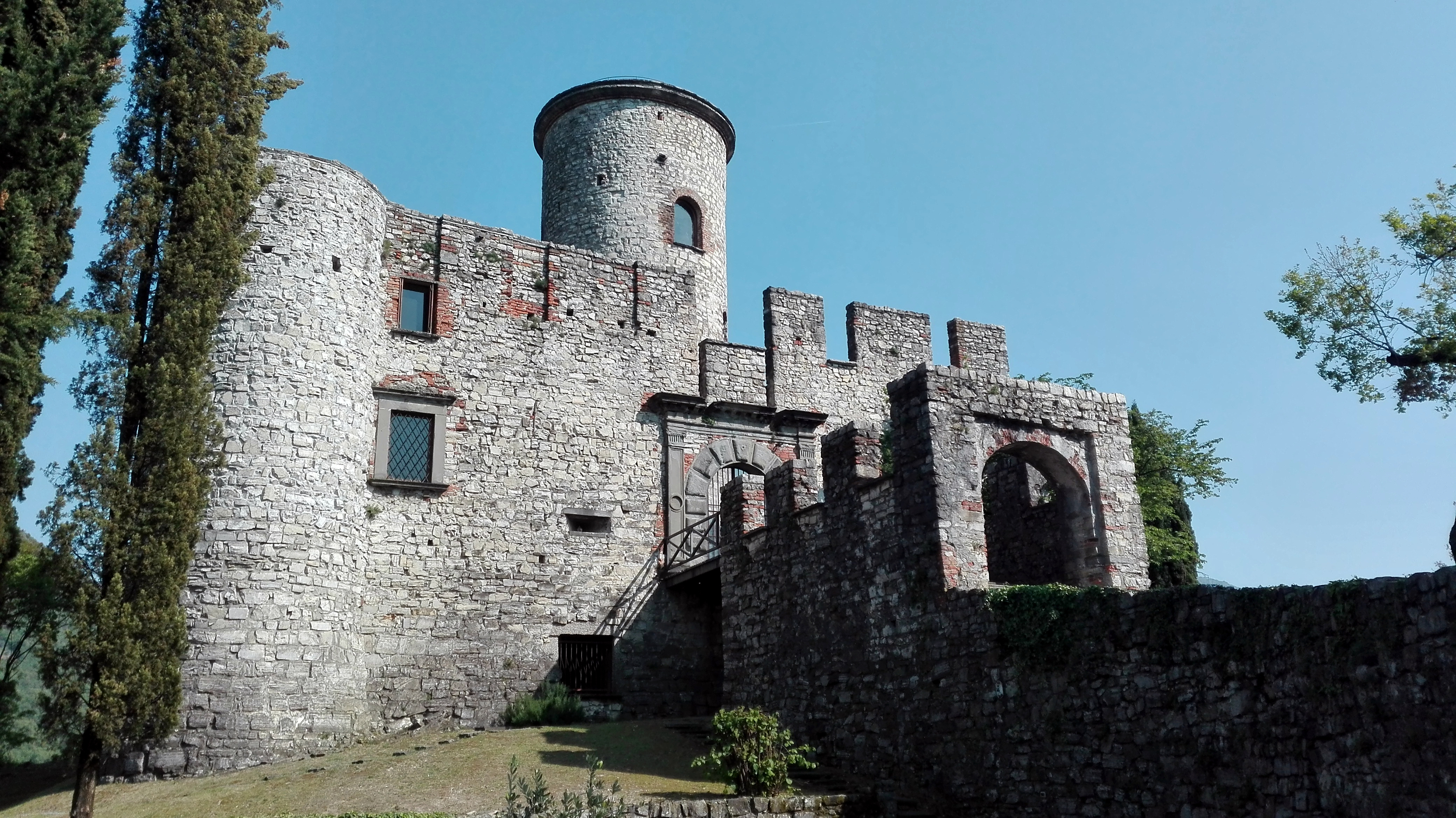
Montisola

=== Other sights ===
- Lake Garda, Lake Iseo and Lake Idro;
- Stelvio National Park;
- Adamello Regional Park;
- Alto Garda Bresciano Regional Park;
- Torbiere del Sebino Natural Reserve;
- Earth pyramids of Zone Natural Reserve;
- I Borghi più belli d'Italia: Bienno, Gardone Riviera, Montisola and Tremosine;
- Grandi Giardini Italiani: Vittoriale degli Italiani, Isola del Garda, Giardino Botanico Andrè Heller, Le Vigne di Bellavista - Franciacorta;
- Natural monuments of Buco del Frate, Altopiano di Cariadeghe, Baluton and Masso del Permico;
- Ski resorts of Ponte di Legno, Temù and Montecampione in Valcamonica;
- Franciacorta wine region;
- Grottoes of Catullus
- Lake Baitone
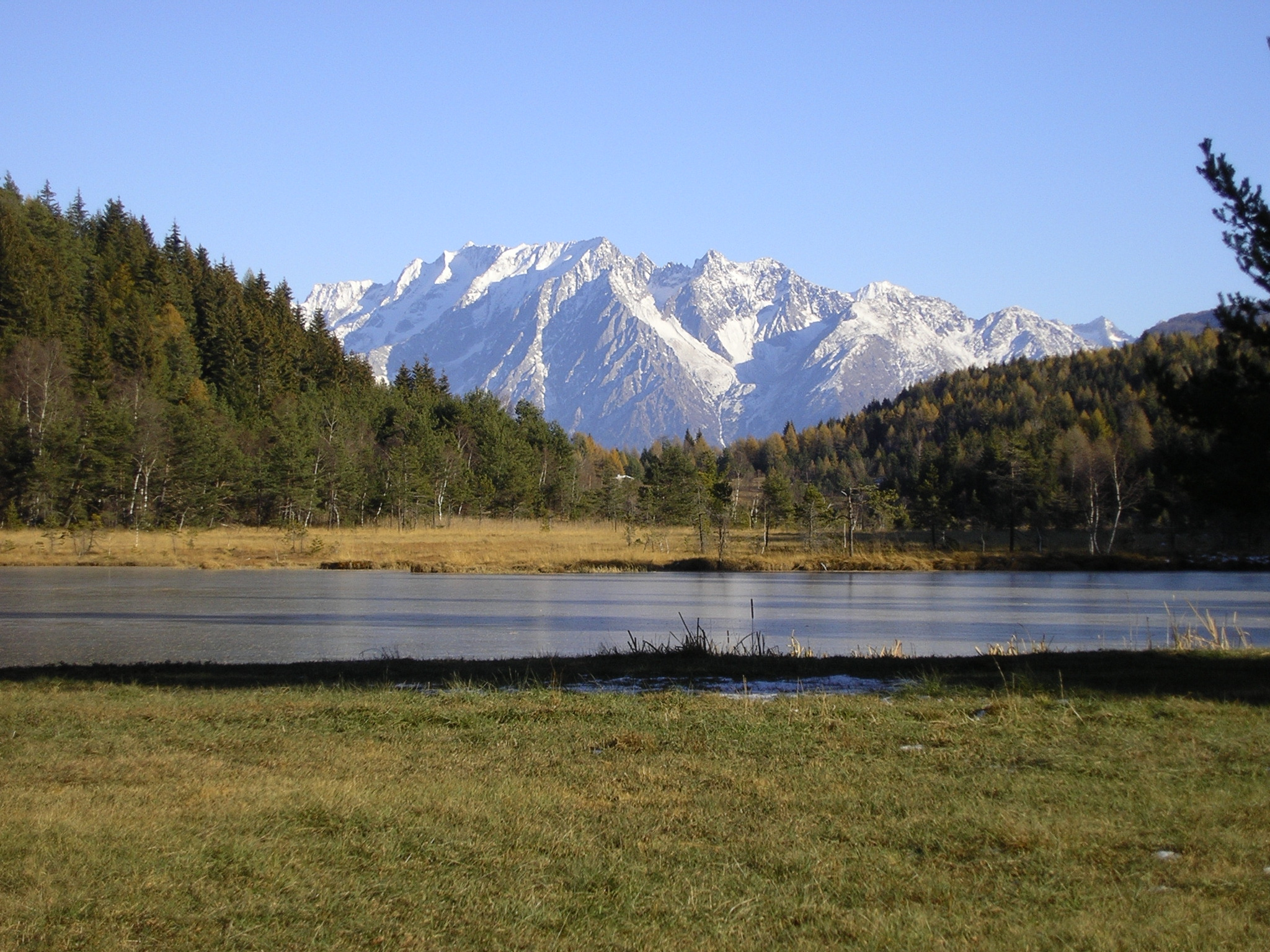
Mount Adamello

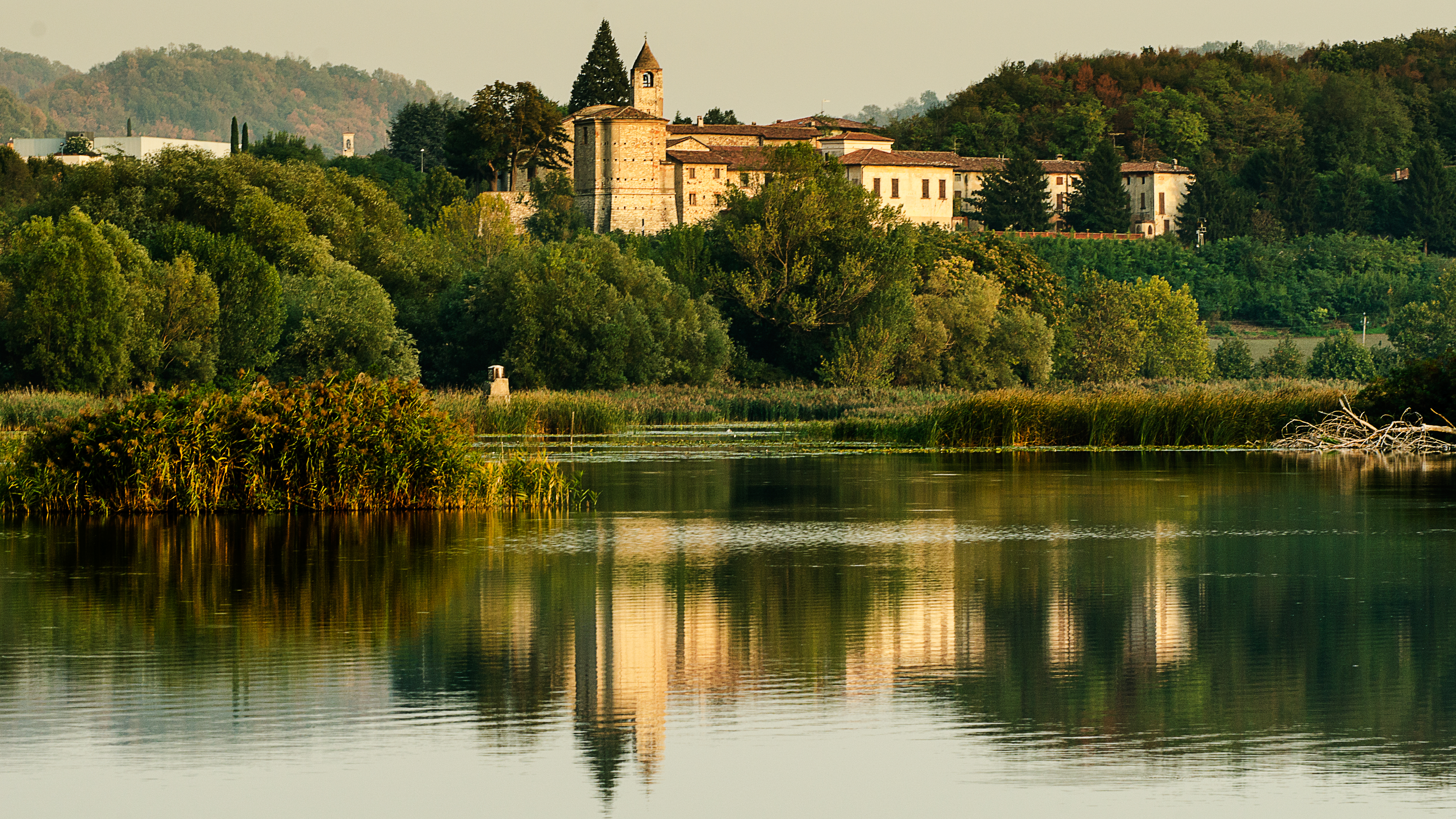
The natural reserve of Torbiere del Sebino

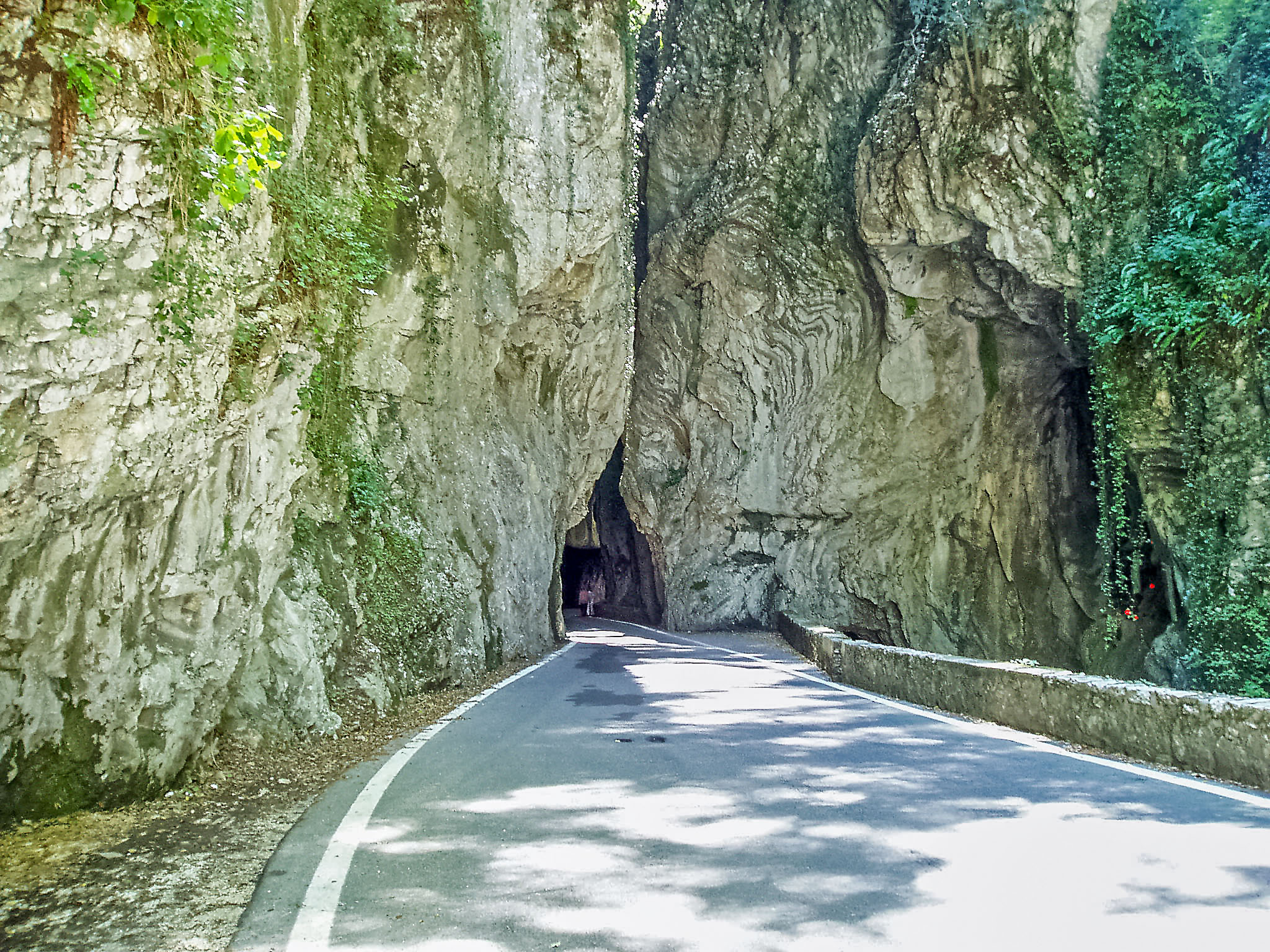
Strada della Forra in Tremosine

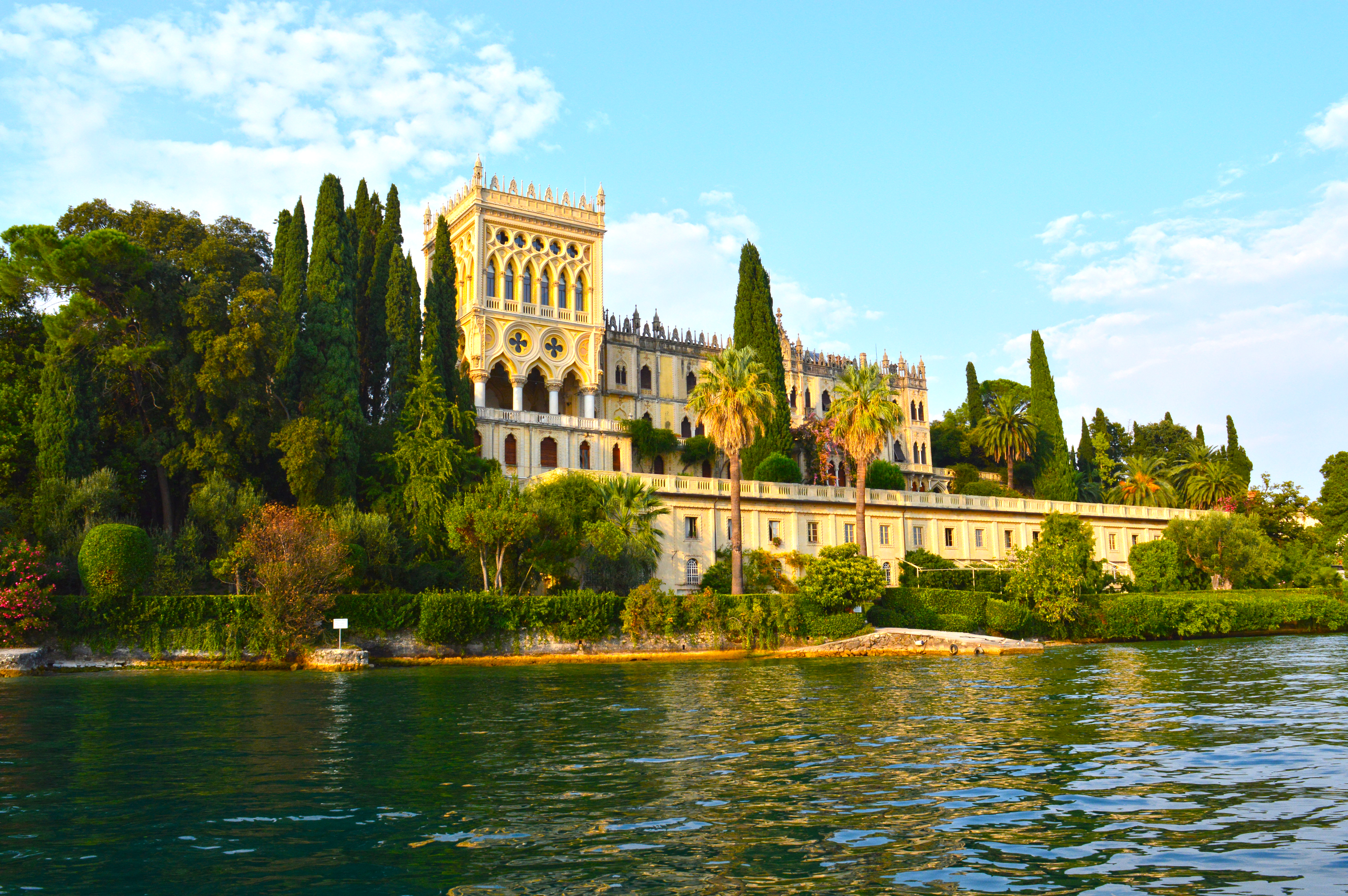
Villa Borghese-Cavazza on the Isola del Garda

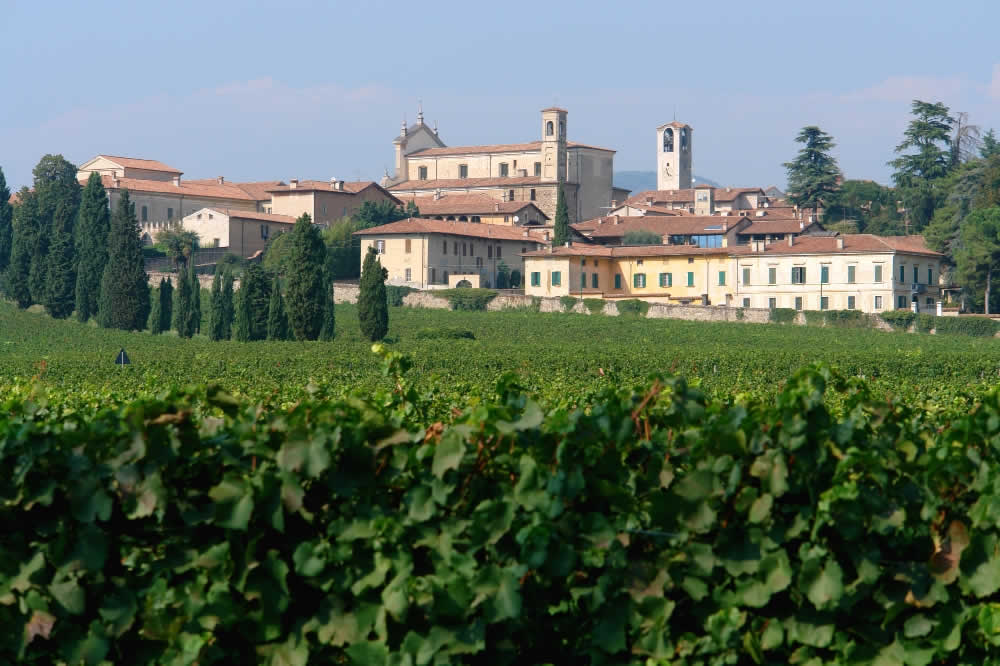
Vineyards in Franciacorta
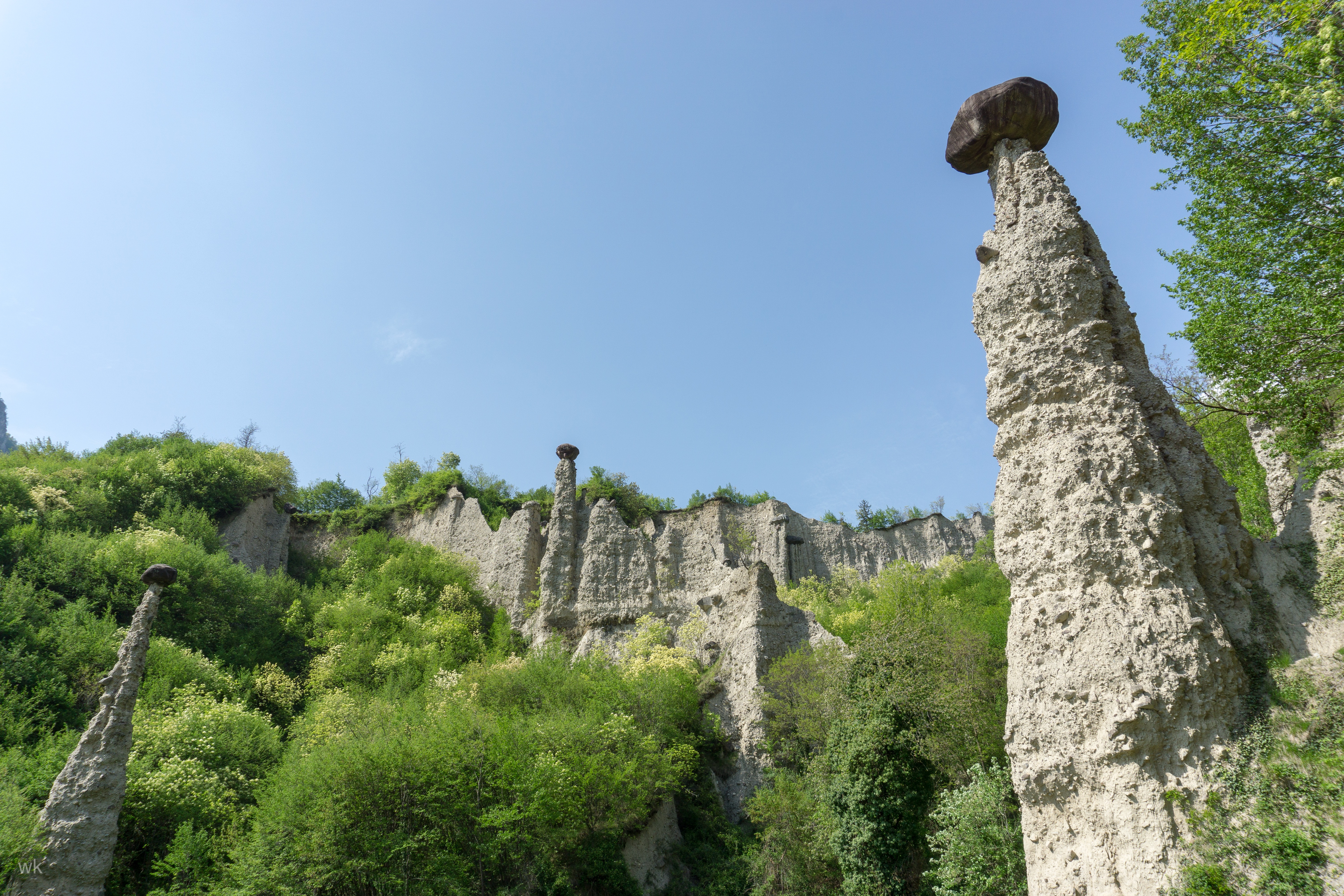
Earth pyramids of Zone

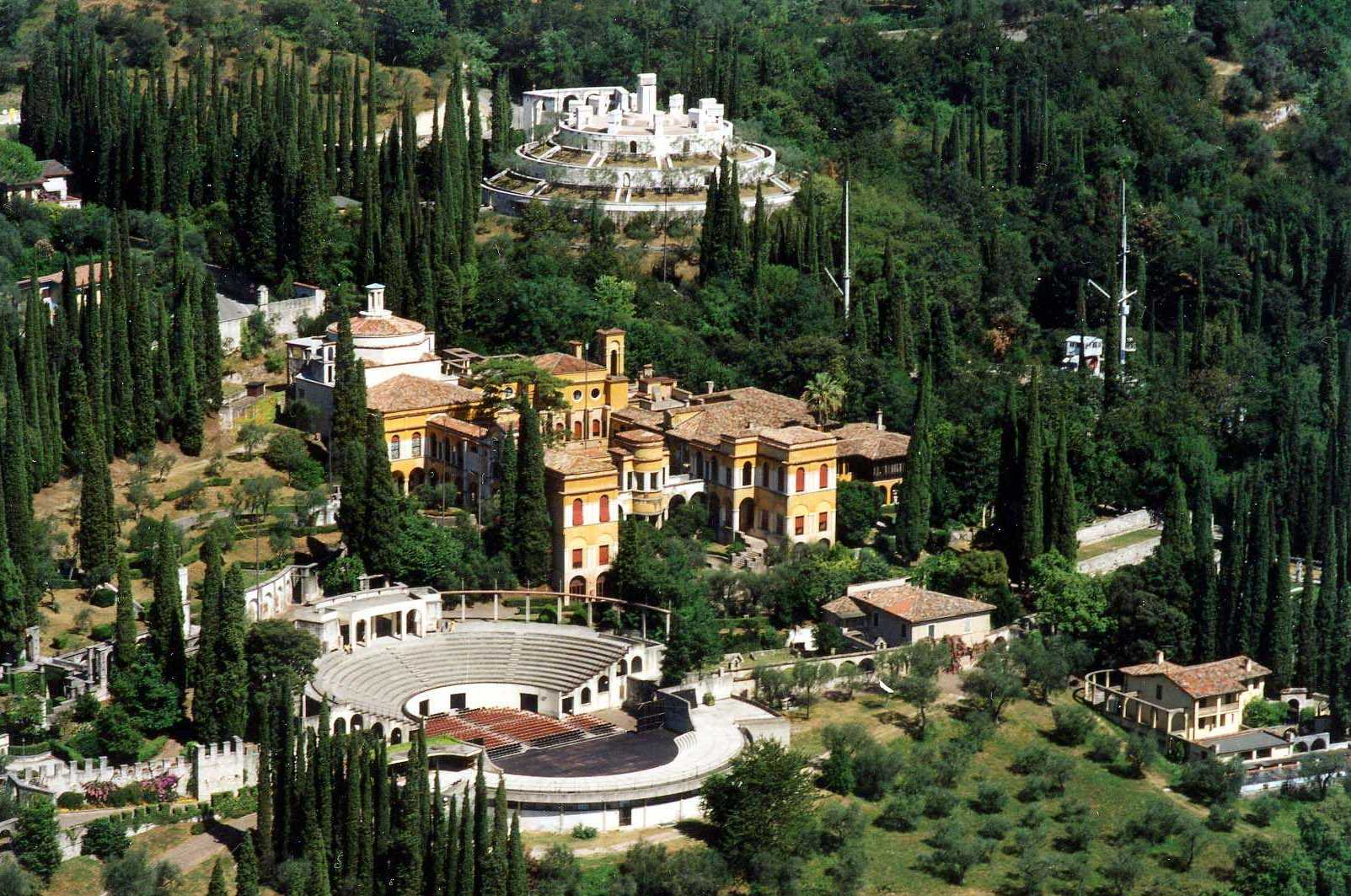
Vittoriale degli Italiani

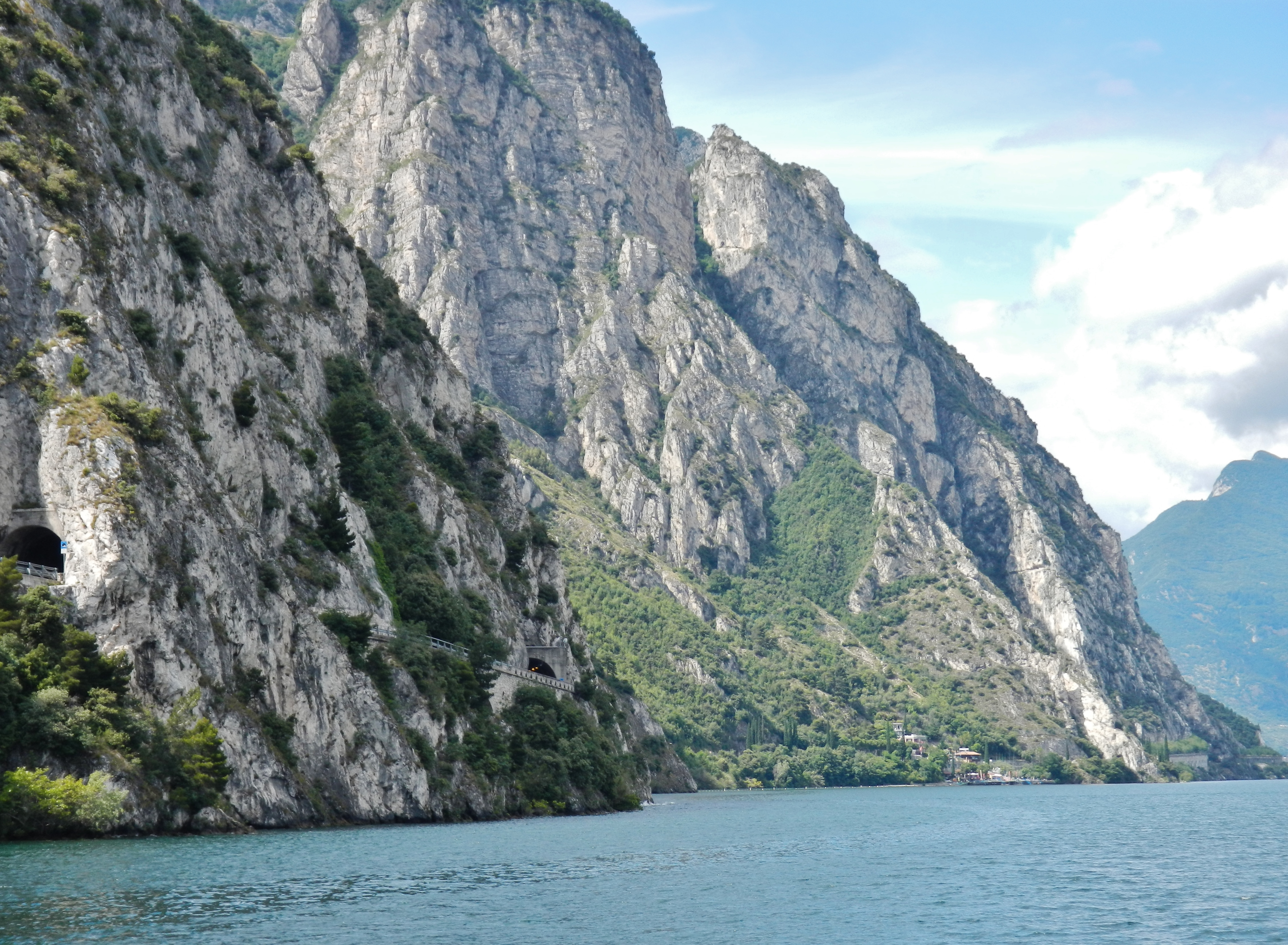
Alto Garda Bresciano Regional Park

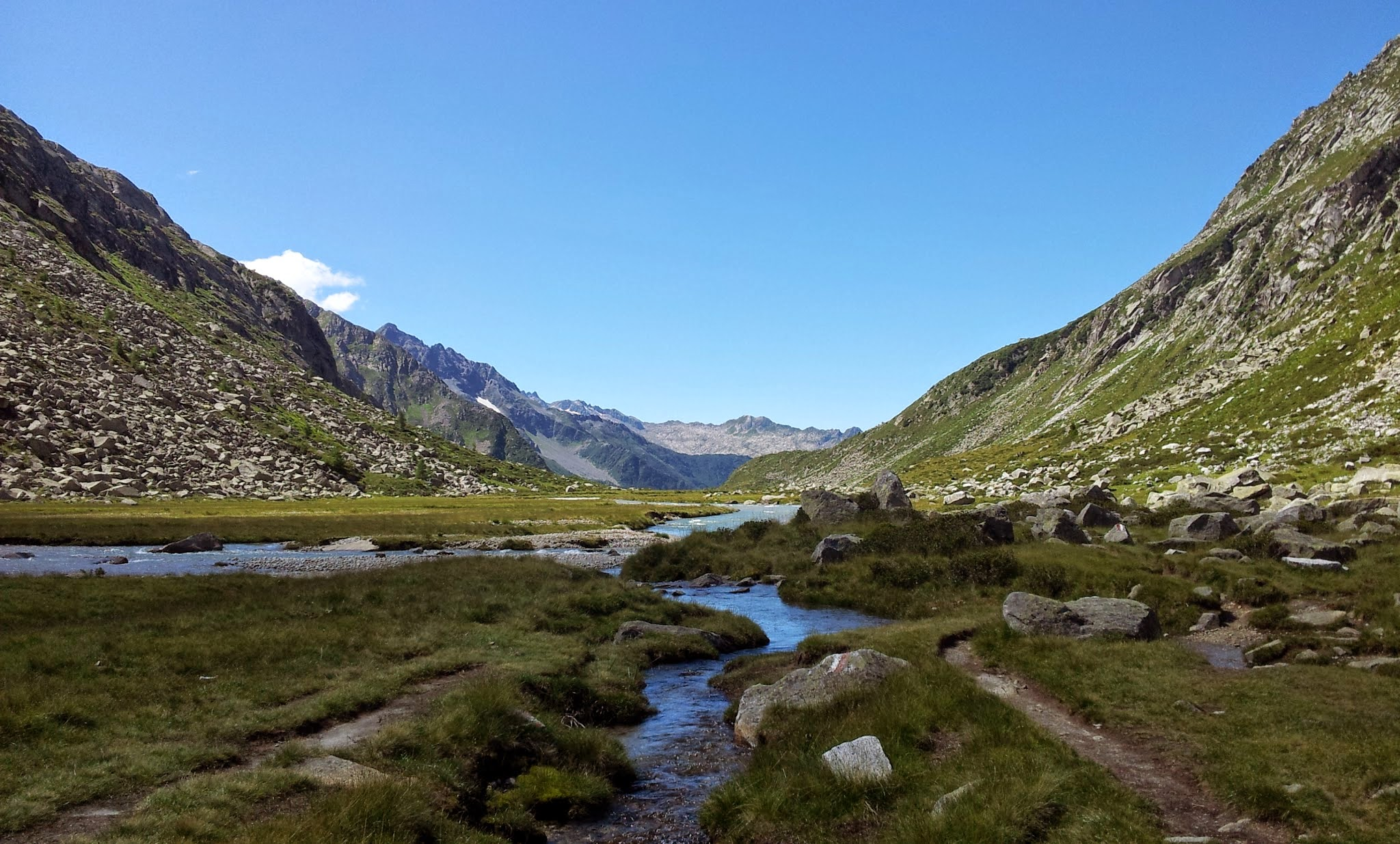
Adamello Regional Park

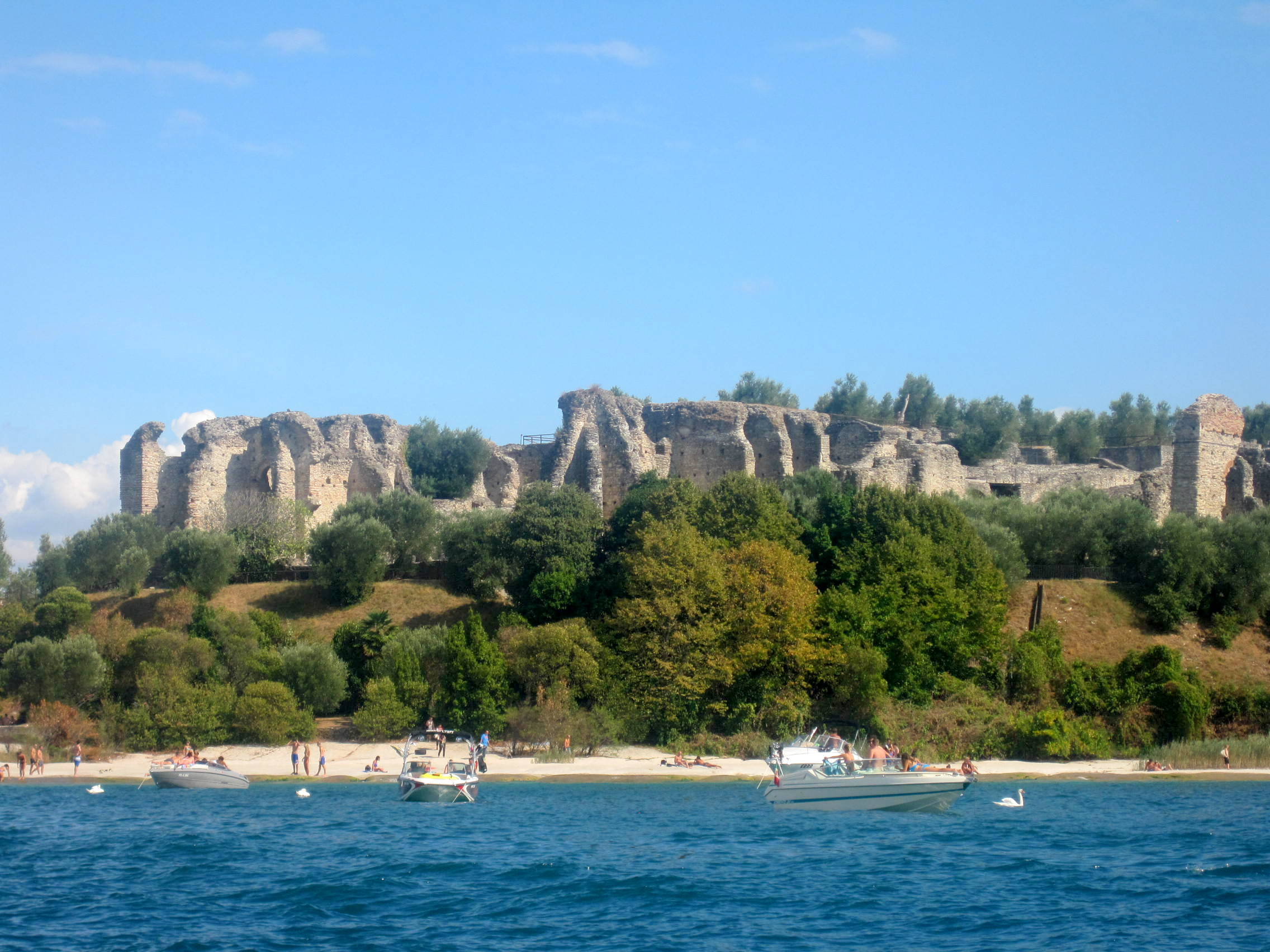
Grottoes of Catullus
