= Rocca di Manerba del Garda =

Rocky promontory in Lombardy, Italy

Rocca di Manerba del Garda (Lombardy)
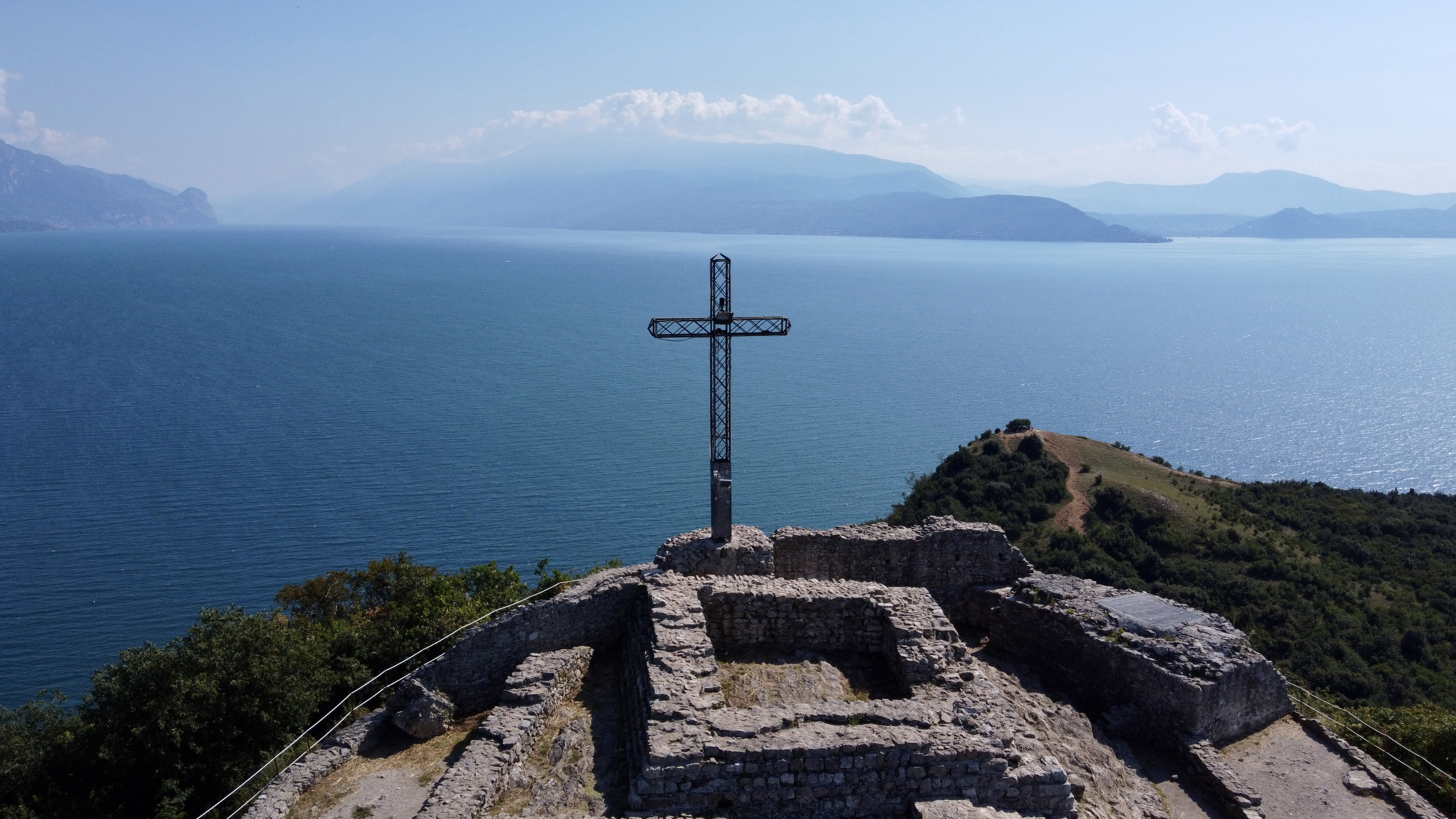
- Christian cross at the peak of Rocca di Manerba del Garda

- Location within Lombardy Location within Italy

General information
- Type: Fortress
- Architectural style: Medieval architecture
- Location: Lombardy, Via Giacomo Matteotti, 10, 25080 Manerba del Garda BS, Manerba del Garda, Italy
- Coordinates: 45°33′45.5575″N 10°33′10.5722″E
- Elevation: 190 m (620 ft)

Technical details
- Material: Bricks, stones, granite, iron, ceramic, marble, wood
- Size: 84 hectares (210 acres)

Website
- www.riservaroccamanerba.com/it/

The Rocca di Manerba del Garda (fortress of Manerba del Garda) is a rocky promontory, that extends along the southwestern coast of Lake Garda, in Lombardy, Italy. The site, named after its medieval fortification period, is archaeologically significant, with human occupation evidenced from the Mesolithic, Neolithic, Bronze Age, Iron Age, ancient Roman and Medieval periods. Archaeological features include the ruins of the medieval fortification on the summit, and, on the south-western side of the peninsula, the remains of an ancient Roman villa. It consists of two main peaks: the Rocca Vecchia and the hill with the hermitage of San Giorgio.

== Location ==
The Rocca di Manerba del Garda is located on a rocky spur overlooking Lake Garda in the municipality of Manerba del Garda (Province of Brescia), in Lombardy, Italy. It is at an elevation of 162 meters above sea level and has a surface area of 28 km^{2} (11 sq mi). It is the location of an archaeological park, Parco Naturalistico-Archeologico di Manerba del Garda, which is a UNESCO World Heritage Site and it was named after its Roman temple built for the goddess Minerva. The fortification can be reached by car from the center of Manerba del Garda and the car park is a few meters from the remains of the Rocca di Manerba del Garda. It is possible to access the site through the path that crosses the park, cuts across the "Sasso" plateau, and climbs up to the ruins of the castle.

== History ==
=== Prehistoric period ===
The Rocca di Manerba del Garda was subject to many archaeological excavations which brought to light remains of various prehistoric settlements. In 1955, the announcement of the first proof of prehistoric finds in the area was published. Archaeological excavations in the Sasso area, just below the fortress, revealed traces of a Mesolithic settlement that evidences the presence of human beings about 8000 to 5000 years ago. The area around Sopra Sasso, between the fortification and the lakefront, was the site of a Neolithic Age settlement. It appears possible that fragments of Square Mouth Pottery found on the Rocca di Manerba del Garda are testimony to further activity in the same period. Such as ruins date back to the Lagozza Culture (4000 BC). There is evidence of rituals, cultural and religious activities during the Bronze Age (3000 BC), such as bronze objects. These are evidence of life, even during the Iron Age in the Rocca di Manerba del Garda. The area of the Rocca is also known for the pile-dwelling sites located by the small basins on the lake. Between 1971 and 1980, a 150 meters long pile-dwelling settlement was found in the area of San Sivino and it is part of the UNESCO heritage site. Further excavations revealed the existence of two housing phases: one between the 20th century and the 17th century B.C. and another one between the 17th century and the 16th century B.C. There is also evidence of the rule of the Etruscans.

=== Historic period ===
Numerous archaeological finds have evidenced the presence of subsequent human occupation over a considerable period. It has been ruled and affected by different cultural and ethnic groups, including the Cenomani, the ancient Rome, and the Langobards.

The first archaeological explorations began in the period 1881–1885 with the excavation of the Roman burial land at the foot of the hill. In September 1971, trenches dug along the north-western side of the hill during work laying water mains revealed finds connecting to prehistoric, Roman, and medieval periods.

Archaeologists discovered defensive walls surrounding the highest point of the fortress built between the 7th century and the 8th century A.D. .

Because of these discoveries, the Soprintendenza alle Antichità Della Lombardia chose to start a formal archaeological excavation. In the years between 1971 and 1981, various trenches were found in several locations, also inside the chapel of San Niccolò.

Field-walking surveys accompanied the excavations along the slopes and at the foot of the outcrop. The integration of these with the study of aerial photographs of the area led to the identification of the terraced Roman villa. The retaining walls of this villa are still partly observable in the undergrowth, at the bottom of the north-western slope of the Rocca di Manerba del Garda. Some coins date back to the years 375-392 A.d. and a bronze ring indicates that the site was inhabited during the Late-Roman period.

In 776 the Rocca di Manerba del Garda was the last bastion of resistance of the Lombards to the Franks of King Charlemagne, which a century later donated the surrounding territory and the lake to the monks of San Zeno di Verona. Over time, as for many other fortresses, the property was conquered by the Scaligeri of Verona. It was then passed to the Visconti family and during the Renaissance was owned by the Republic of Venice. The defensive structures progressively decayed and resulted in it becoming abandoned. It was subsequently occupied by bandits, due to its strong defensive characteristics. Later, in 1574, the last medieval structure was destroyed by the Venetian Republic, as it had become a refuge for bandits. Today there are still some remains of it.

== Geology ==
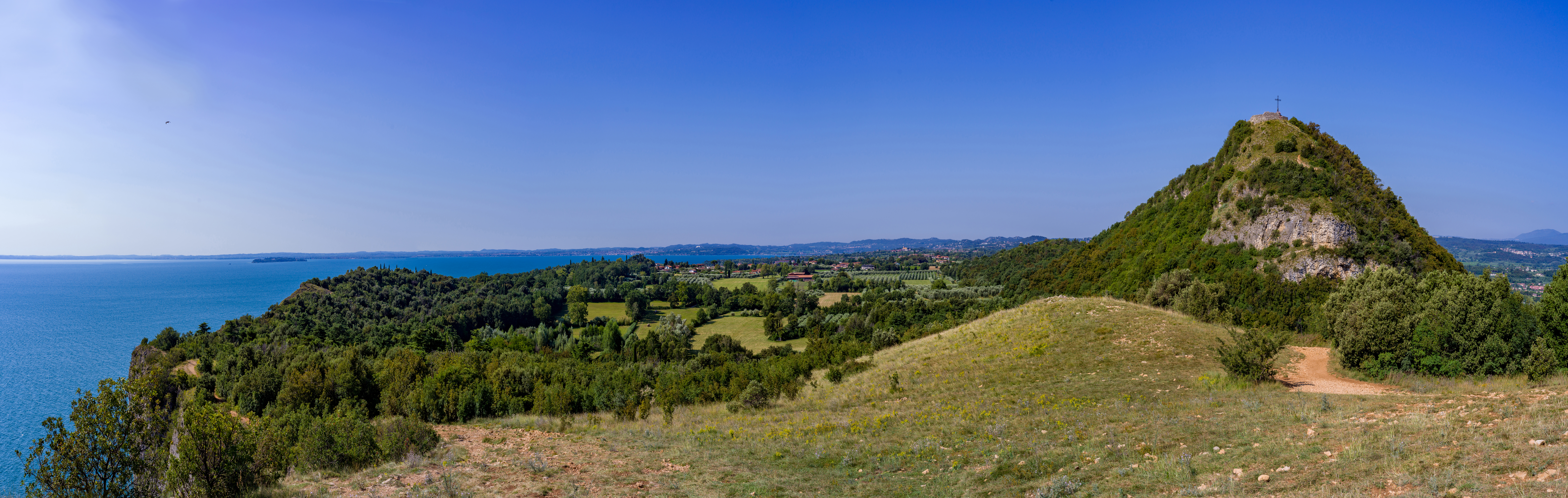
Landscape around the Rocca

The landscape is typically hilly with slight creases in the land, while in the Rocca di Manerba del Garda area the landscape has an older formation, with more bold slopes and angular terrain. It is primarily due to tectonic plate movements along the faults found in those areas. The Rocca di Manerba del Garda is on the lakeside of Lake Garda. It was formed by complex adjustments to the planet's crust which happened millions of years ago and has been the subject of investigations by geologists.

== Archaeological features ==
Among the numerous archaeological features, there are:

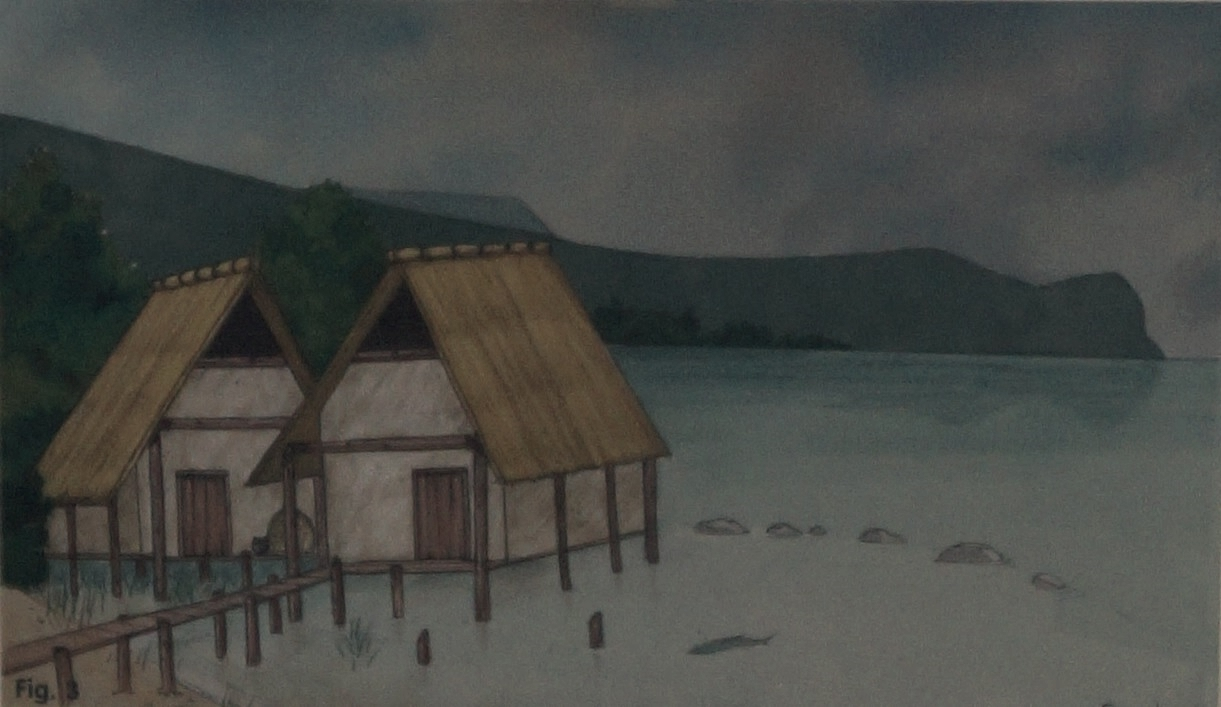
The reconstruction of the pile dwelling in San Sivino, Gabbiano

- The pile dwelling in San Sivino, Gabbiano: This UNESCO Heritage Site is also known as the "Gabbiani" pile dwelling. Discovered in 1971, it was inhabited at different periods (from the 20th to the 18th century BC and from the 17th to 16th century BC). It is made up of wooden piles and stones. These ruins are still set close to the shore of the lake. Here, archaeologists also found ceramics and bronzes. Although its location is known, significant and continuous studies on this site have not been made yet.
- Burial Chamber 133 : Paved with cobbles, this burial chamber contained preserved fragments of ceramics, a stone axe in the floor, shards of pots, the skeleton of a newborn, pearls of steatite (a black rock) and white marble and flint flakes.
- Brandopferplatz: It is a sanctuary built on Monte Covo. Here there are metal objects and an outdoor altar mainly used for rituals. Bones were found on its altar. These sanctuaries can be more often seen in the area from the pre-Alps to the Tyrol.
- The Riparo Valtenesi: The natural terrace under the rocks was used in different eras for various purposes such as shelter, as a cemetery in the Neolithic, a collective tomb in the Copper Age, and as a quarry during the Roman era. This quarry probably was for building materials and, perhaps due to a law of Emperor Augustus, the tombs and burials were not disturbed. Conceivably the rock shelter was still considered a sacred place, and it was used again for burial in the medieval period. There are fragmentary shards of ceramics dating back to different ages, from the Middle Neolithic to the Logozza period with peculiar characteristics, and they were created following different procedures. Another feature of the Riparo Valtenesi is the burial ritual: a three-step process that starts with putting the bodies without their bones under the ground in the burial chambers. Also, objects like necklaces were put into the burial chambers. A platform of rocks was built, and the chambers were then burnt. Finally, these burials were then covered with another platform of stones.
- The Roman Villa: it is facing the lake on the western side of the Rocca di Manerba del Garda, and is one of the numerous Roman villas discovered in the area. It was constructed with opus signinum in the 1st century AD. Some of its materials were used for a later medieval building. The villa was first uncovered between 1977 and 1980 but only recently pieces of amphora, mosaics, and ceramics were discovered and confirmed the Roman presence.
- The Necropolis of Campo Olivello: This Roman necropolis, was discovered at the end of the 1800s. It was used as a burial site between the first century and the beginning of the 5th century B.C. . The cemetery is located in the proximity of the Roman villa.
- The Rocca: The fortification takes its name from the medieval fortification, of which there are three walled circuits. The innermost (built between the 8th and 15th century A.D.), circles the central tower and contains a cistern for collecting rainwater. It was possible to access the top through a gate, and a ramp made of wood, which could be easily destroyed in case of an enemy's attack. The external defensive walls were first built from the 8th to the 10th centuries A.D. . They were rebuilt between the 12th and 13th century A.D. . Two parallel buildings have been constructed around them. One of them appears to hold some particular importance, given the traces of decoration found painted on the walls. The buildings and the defensive walls have been destroyed during a violent attack. Defensive walls have been re-erected through the use of the older structure as a base for the construction. There is a possible fourth wall, which is yet to be correctly identified. Today, there is only a brief trace that runs north-west, beneath the path that leads to the fortress.
- The Oratory of San Siro: It has been the subject of archaeological studies in 1977, 1979, and 1980. Researchers have dated the building as pre-11th century A.D. Due to its form (with a semicircular and quadrangular apse) and more significantly for the presence of internal wall plaster and fragments of painted plaster found in the rubble, researchers deducted it was a chapel. Outside the main building, there are two phases of tombs, some with stone structures and other simple earthen graves. Researchers found it was subsequently used as the oratory of San Siro, which was visited by Bishop Gilberti in 1530.

== Civic Archaeological Valtenesi Museum ==
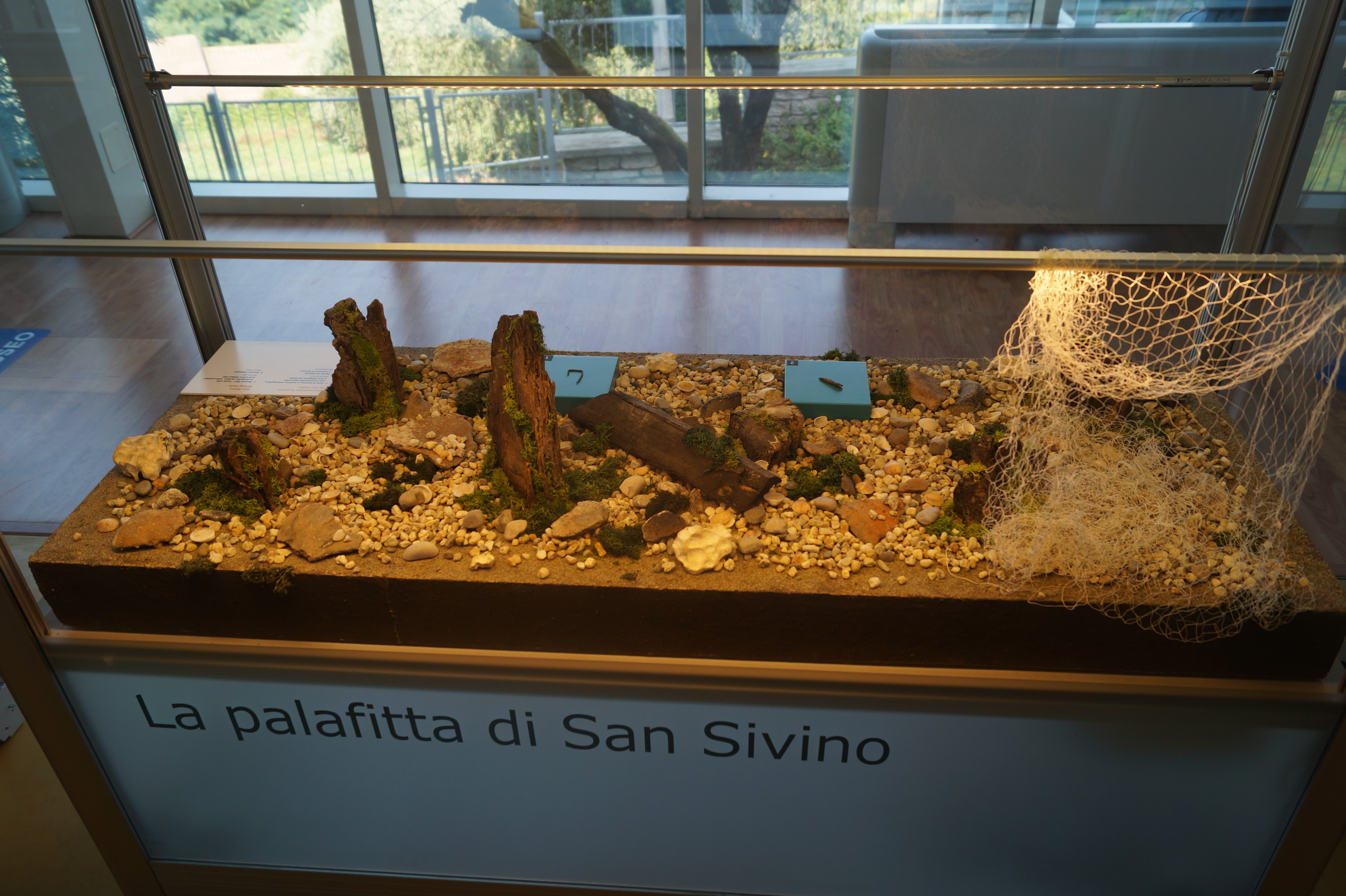
The remains of the pile dwelling in San Sivino

The Civic Archaeological Valtenesi Museum was first built close to Pieve Santa Maria and then relocated to the top of the Rocca di Manerba del Garda. It offers basic information about the flora, fauna, and nature treks. It provides archaeological and historical information about the site history, which dates back to the ages between the Mesolithic and the 16th century. It features details about San Sivino (a World Heritage Site); Pieve di Santa Maria (where there are the ruins of an ancient Roman villa and medieval buildings; and, ruins of pile dwelling from the Bronze Era. On the ground floor, it is possible to see the finds from the excavations conducted in Sasso and Riparo Valtenesi, Rocca, Pieve e San Sivino. The first floor is dedicated to nature with photos of the fauna of the park and a map of the cycling tracks and footpaths. All the information is written both in English and Italian. The museum is part of the Visitor Center. This building is located in a strategic position on the way to the top of the Rocca di Manerba del Garda and has a large window. The main aim of the center is to educate visitors about the archaeological features, the landscape and nature of Manerba del Garda, and provide information about the park. It is also one of the main starting points of various trails.

== Flora and fauna ==
The Rocca di Manerba del Garda is part of a large natural reserve of 900,000 square meters which has the peculiarity of containing the Parco Archeologico e Naturalistico della Rocca e del Sasso and Parco Lacuale di Manerba del Garda, the largest lake park in Italy.

=== Flora ===
Pond in the natural reserve

The site is characterized by the presence of numerous varieties of Mediterranean essences, some prehistorical plants, and botanical rarities, including flowers such as the wild Orchidaceae, located widely over the park, and the Erythronium dens-canis, a Liliaceae situated on the underbrush of the Rocca di Manerba del Garda. The location is distinguished by the development of grassy vegetation typical of the region, such as the feather grass or (Stipa pennata) and gramineous ornamental grass Melica ciliata. Variety of woodlands, depending on the exposure, gradient, and soil conditions. Examples present on the Rocca di Manerba del Garda include Quercus pubescens or pubescent oak; Cupressus; the Cotinus coggygria or Rhus cotinus; and, Cercis siliquastrum, commonly known as the Judas tree.

=== Fauna ===
The territory is home to aquatic and volatile flying and gliding animals. Due to the protection given to lake areas, there is the presence of great biodiversity, firstly birds common buzzard (Buteo buteo), common kestrel (Falco tinnunculus), European nightjar (Caprimulgus europaeus) and also seagulls. There are reptiles such as the common green lizard (Lacerta bilineata). There are also many kinds of insects. Very ordinary in the Rocca di Manerba del Garda are butterflies, it is possible to find different species such as scarce swallowtail (Iphiclides podalirius), marbled white (Melanargia galathea) and Old World swallowtail (Papilio machaon). Selected species of fish in the adjacent lake area are subject to protection and cannot be fished, to maintain the rarest and most endangered species. The most common fishes present on the reef of Rocca di Manerba del Garda are the common carp (Cyprinus carpio), Squalius cii, eel (Anguilla), and the black bullhead (Ameiurus melas). In order to maintain the ecological diversity, study, and monitor the species, it is strictly prohibited to hunt, build, or drive motor vehicles in the designated area.

== Mountain bike and running trails ==
It is possible to reach the peak of the Rocca di Manerba del Garda by a range of paths and viewpoints. The paths start at an altitude of 63 meters, reaching a maximum altitude of 213 meters. Parts of the ascent are exposed due to the lack of protective barriers by the cliff. From the summit both the Monte Baldo and the Veronese coast up to the peninsula of Sirmione are visible.

	CAI Itinerary	Itinerary 2	Itinerary 3	Itinerary 4	Itinerary 5
From	San Giorgio church	Via Sadat	Via Sadat	Via Rocca	Via Sadat
Estimated travel time	60–70 minutes	25–35 minutes	20–30 minutes	10–15 minutes	50–60 minutes
Difference in altitude	67 meters	70 meters	70 meters	41 meters	70 meters
Difficulty	Difficult	Medium	Medium	Easy	Medium
Length	12 km	7 km	6.5 km	3 km	10 km

== Curiosities ==
=== The legend of the Rocca di Manerba del Garda ===
This local tradition narrates that a long time ago, a ferocious wolf was living in and defending a den overlooking the lake. The wolf prevented anyone from approaching, causing great fears in the population. There were several attempts to capture the dangerous wolf but all with adverse outcomes. The citizens of Manerba del Garda decided to put a price on his head. The news attracted considerable numbers of people, due to the size of the payment, but the numerous attempts to kill the beast were all unsuccessful. Three young hunters came: a boy from Moniga del Garda, one from Raffa, and one from Pieve Vecchia. The legend states that the young hunter from Moniga del Garda attempted to capture the wolf by using live bait, but fell off the cliff. Raffa's young man tried to catch it using a huge net, but he also failed and died. The boy from Pieve Vecchia attempted to attract the wolf by simulating fake wolf howls. He ended up facing the ferocious animal, protecting himself using a large cross as a shield. The fearful wolf retreated and fell off the cliff. In honor of the young hunter from Pieve Vecchia, a large cross was erected on the top of the Rocca di Manerba del Garda. The other hunters' bodies are remembered through two large rocks that emerged from Lake Garda.

=== Sacredness and rites ===
The area was and is still recognized as a sacred place and site of ritual activity, dating from as early as the Copper Age (3rd millennium BC). The Copper Age was the intermediate phase between the Neolithic and Bronze Age. This is demonstrated at the northern edge of the natural shelf at Riparo Valtenesi, where there is an area of earthen fireplaces, scorched and burnt clay, and isolated post-holes, which are interpreted as the place of wooden statues and stelae. At the summit of the fortress, there is no evidence of the celebration of rituals dating earlier than the Final Bronze Age (11th-10th centuries BC), to which period bronze finds can be attributed. This tentative burnt offering site was then destroyed by the construction of the Late Roman cistern. The bronze finds are decorated by fibulae, as well as by fragments of other objects from the Early Iron Age (8th century BC).

== Books ==
Publications about Rocca di Manerba del Garda include:

- Lunardi Costanza, La pietra e l'acqua. Rocca di Manerba. Paesaggi e colori del Garda, 2018. ISBN 8873859798. Publisher: Grafo.
- Brogiolo G.P., La Rocca di Manerba (scavi 1995-1999, 2009), 2011. ISBN 9788887115659 . Publisher: Società Archeologica.
- Bazzoli M., Borlini A., Capelli S., Gallina D., Mazzina T., Motta G., Ragni F., La Rocca di Manerba e l'alta Valtenesi, 2007. ISBN 88 7385 729 9. Publisher: Grafo.

== Similar fortifications ==
Rocca di Manerba del Garda is one of many historic fortifications in Lake Garda; some others are:

- Rocca di Solferino
- Rocca di San Martino
- Fortezza di Peschiera del Garda
- Rocca di Cavriana
- Rocca Visconteo-Veneta at Lonato del Garda

== See also ==
- Desenzano del Garda
- Mantua
- Isola del Garda

== Gallery ==
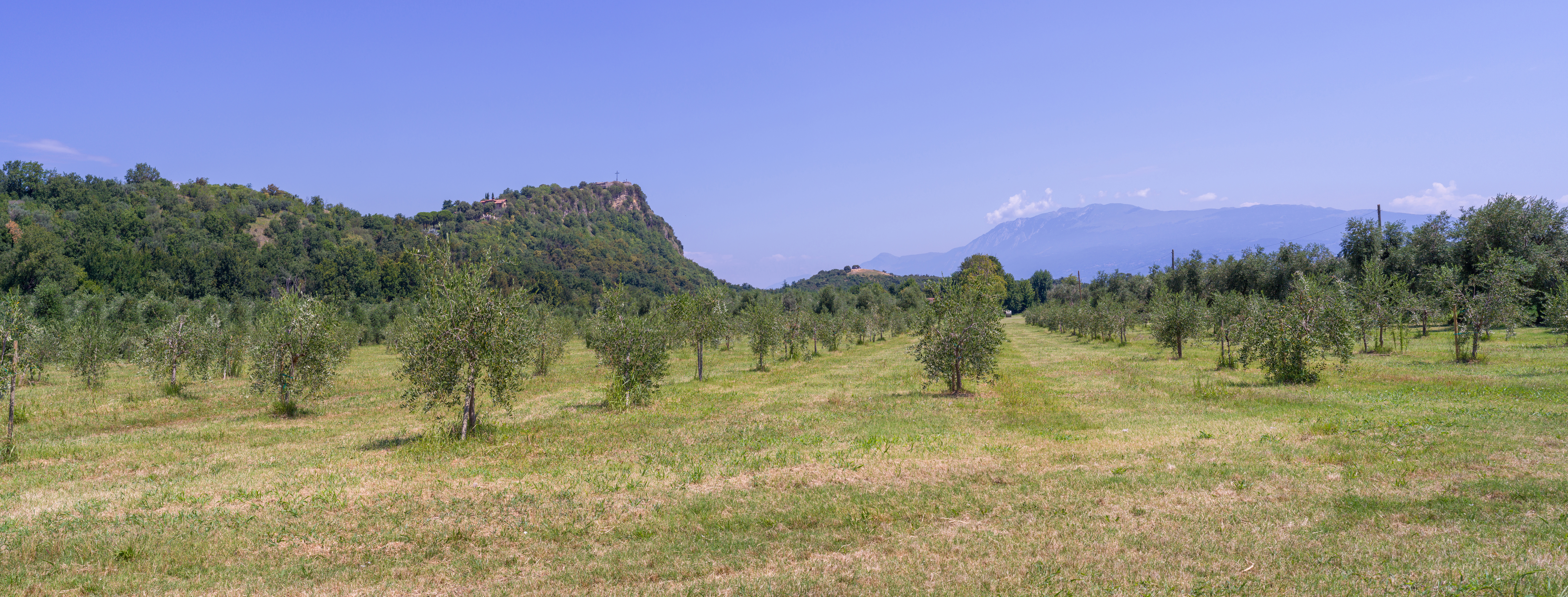
Olive trees around the Rocca di Manerba del Garda

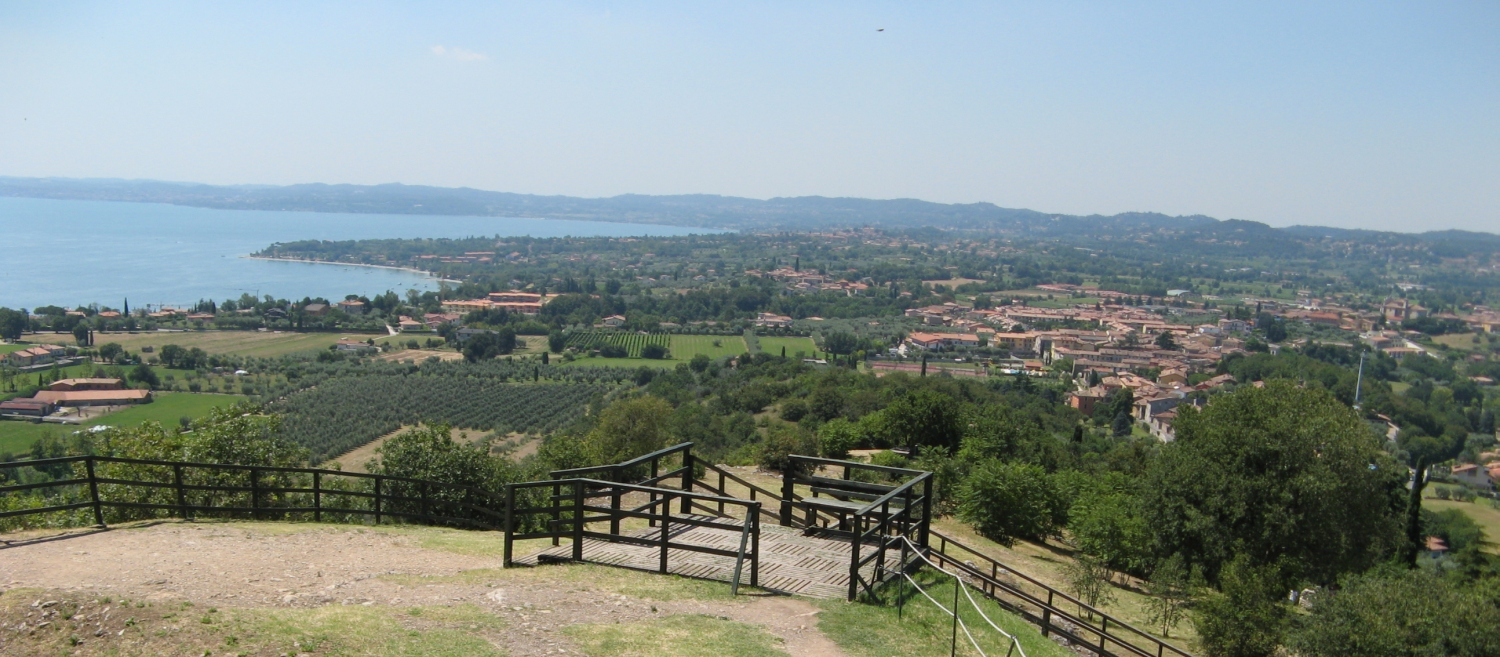
View of the municipality of Manerba del Garda from the peak of Rocca di Manerba del Garda

View of the natural reserve of 900,000 square meters from the peak of Rocca di Manerba del Garda

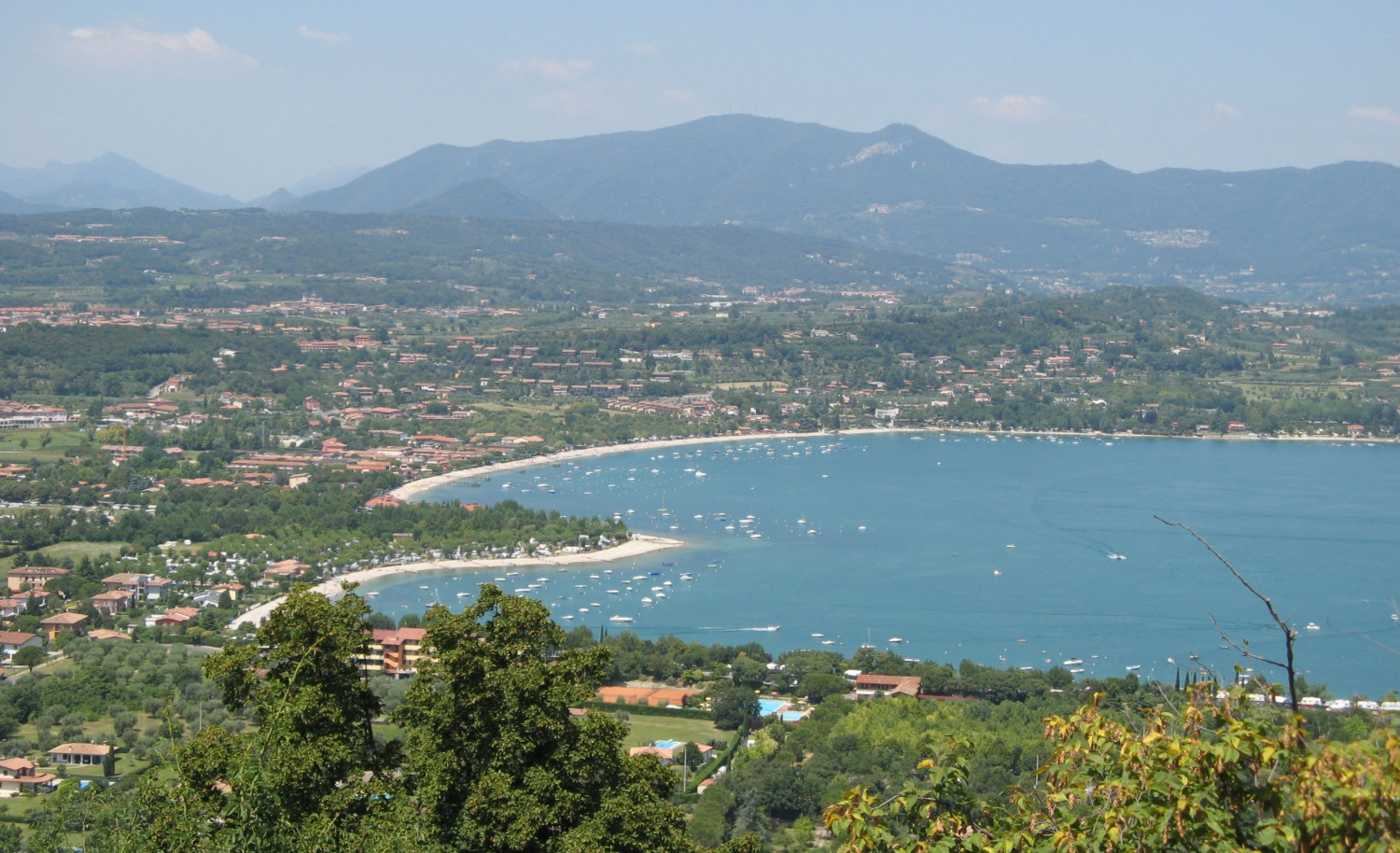
View of Lake Garda from the north of Rocca di Manerba del Garda

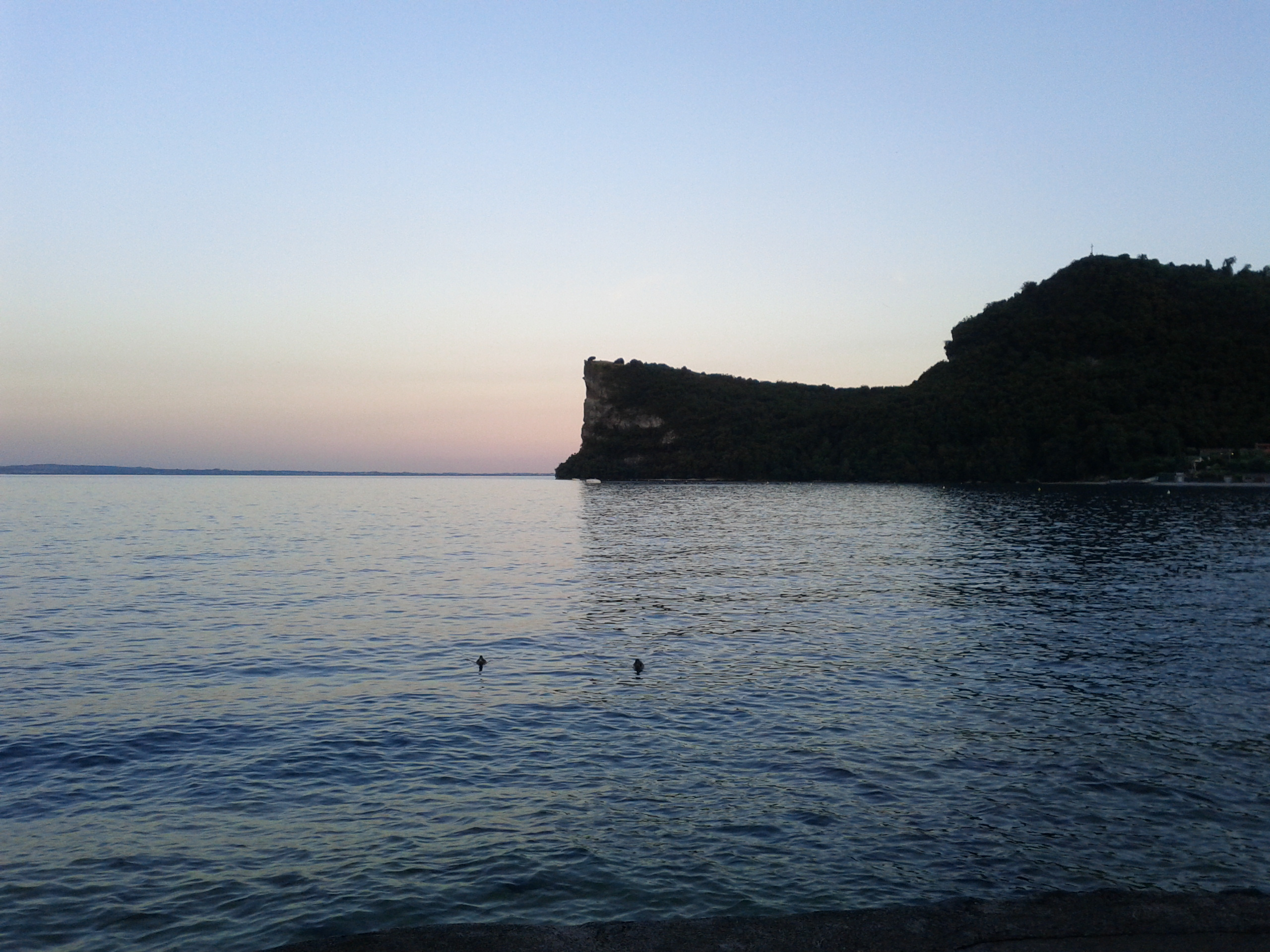
View of the sunrise from Rocca di Manerba del Garda

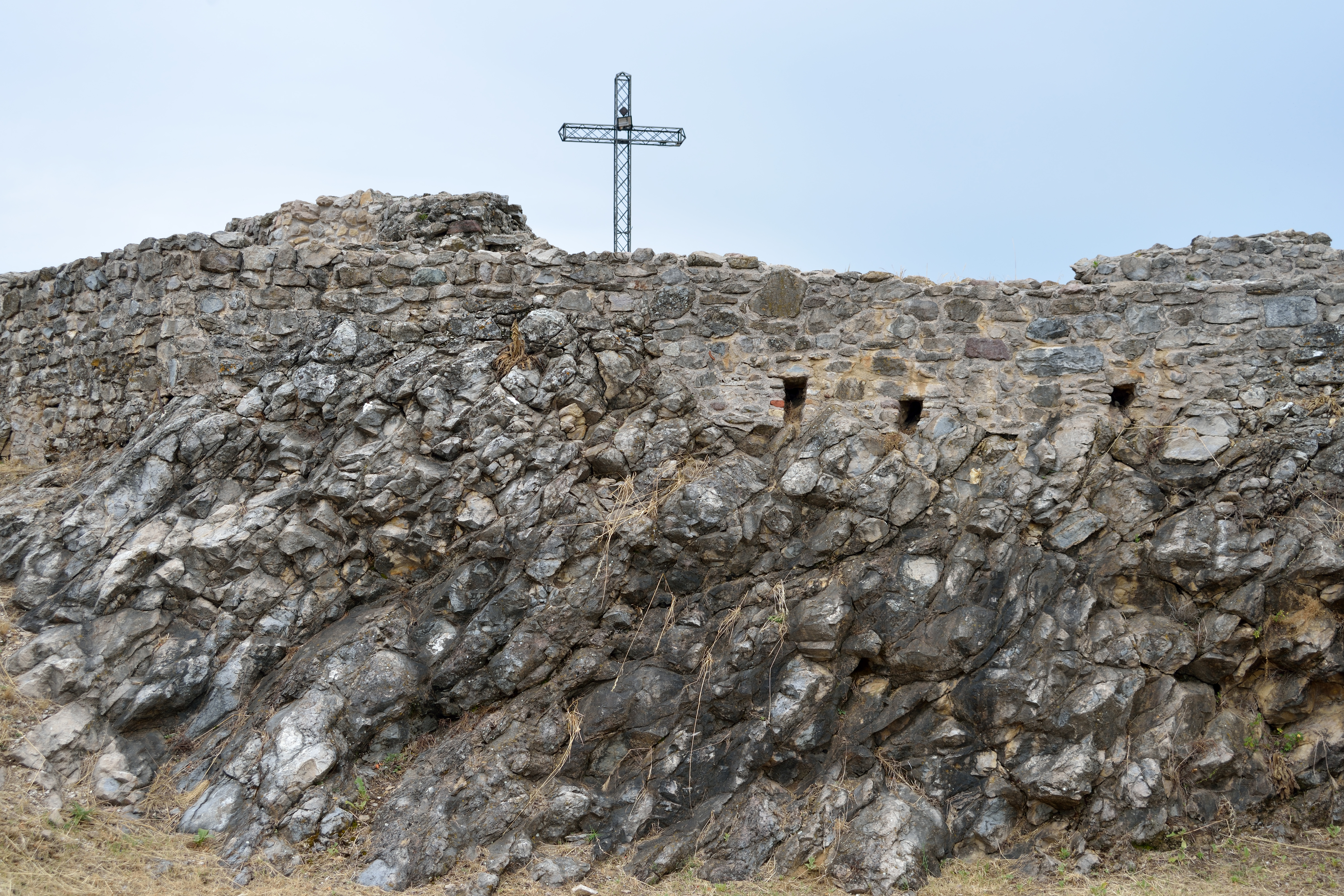
Christian cross at the peak of Rocca di Manerba del Garda

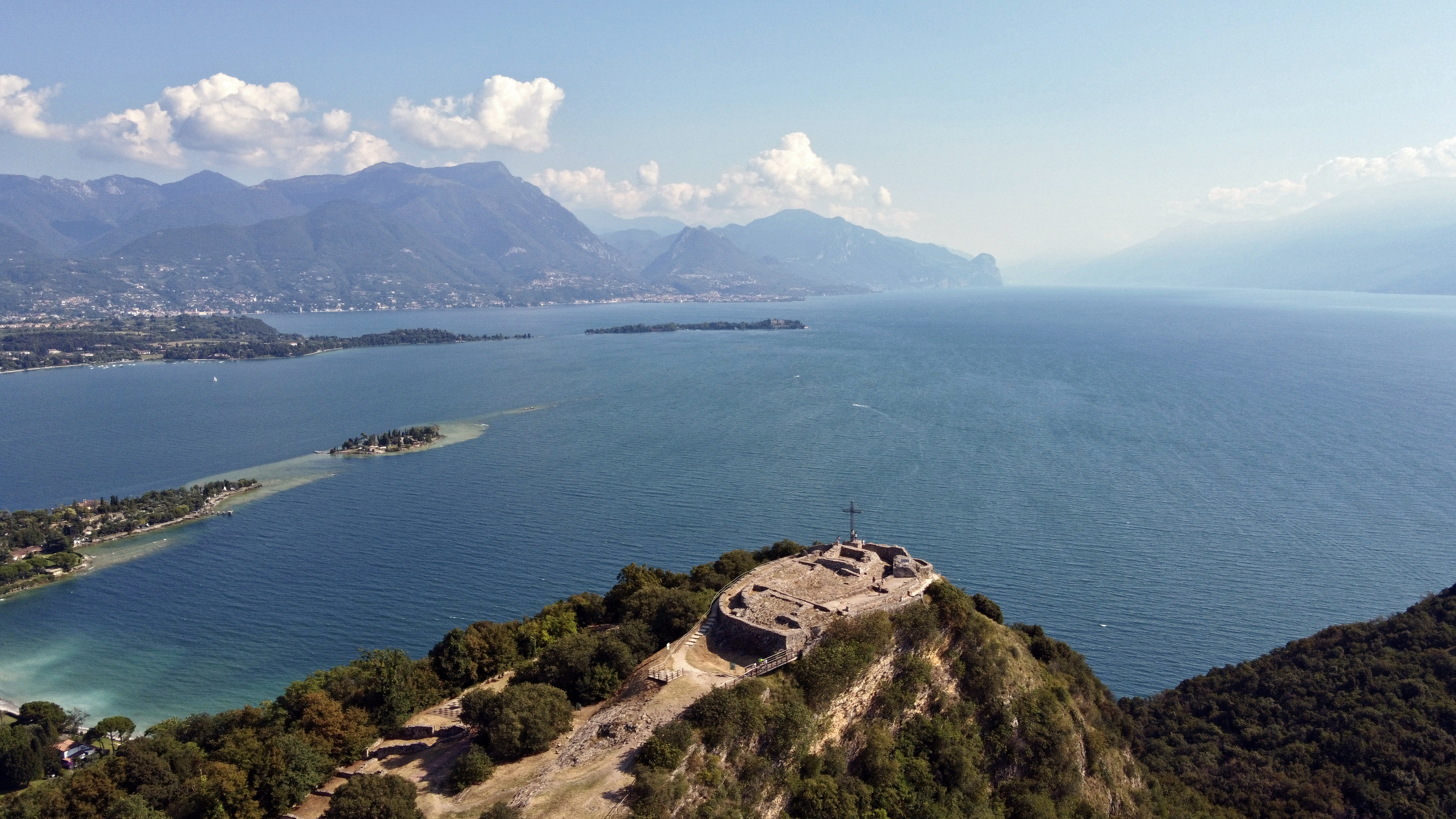
View of the Rocca di Manerba del Garda and the Island of Rabbits

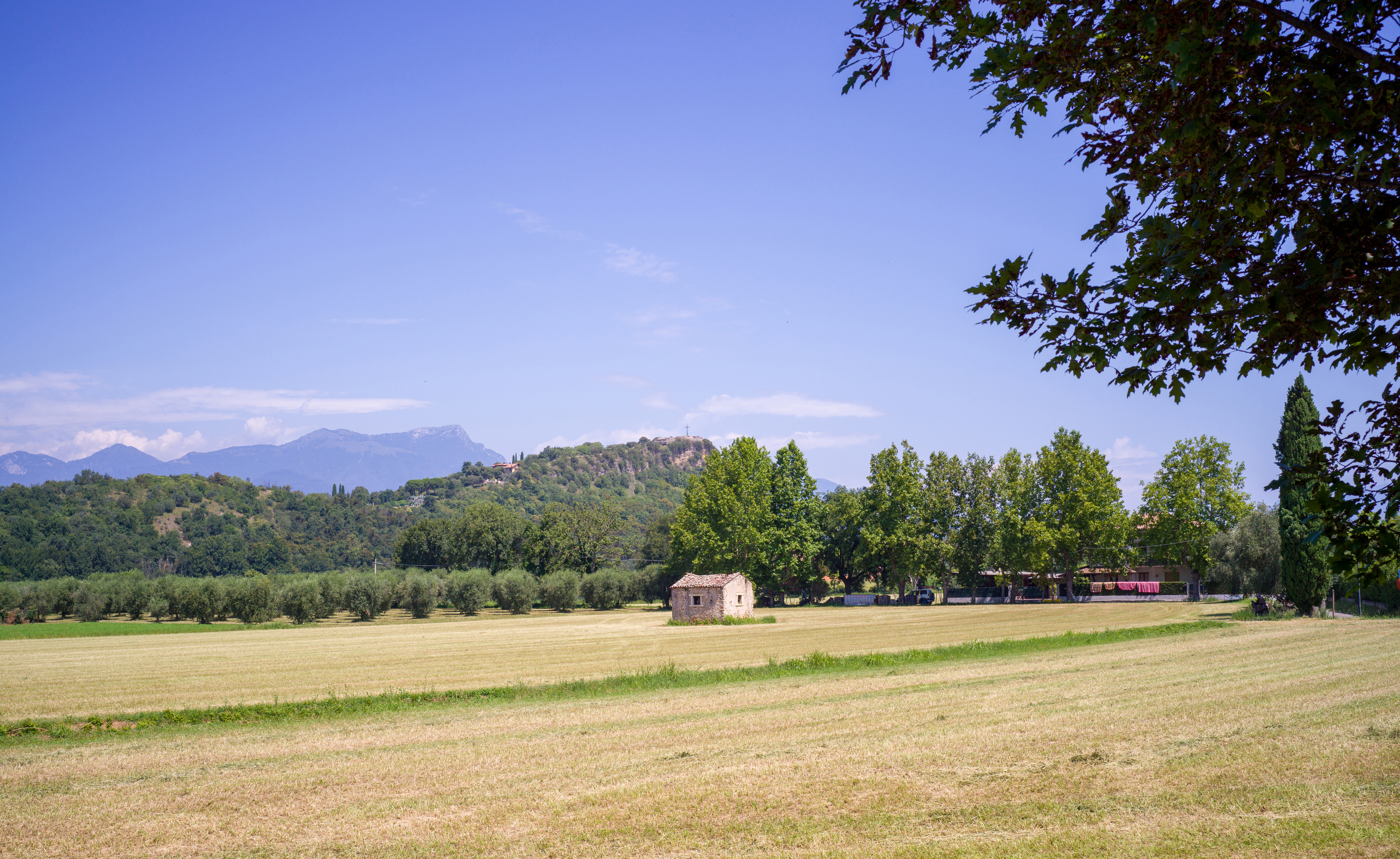
View of Rocca di Manerba del Garda and Monte Pizzocolo from the municipality of Manerba del Garda
