= Padenghe sul Garda =

- Comune
- Comune di Padenghe sul Garda
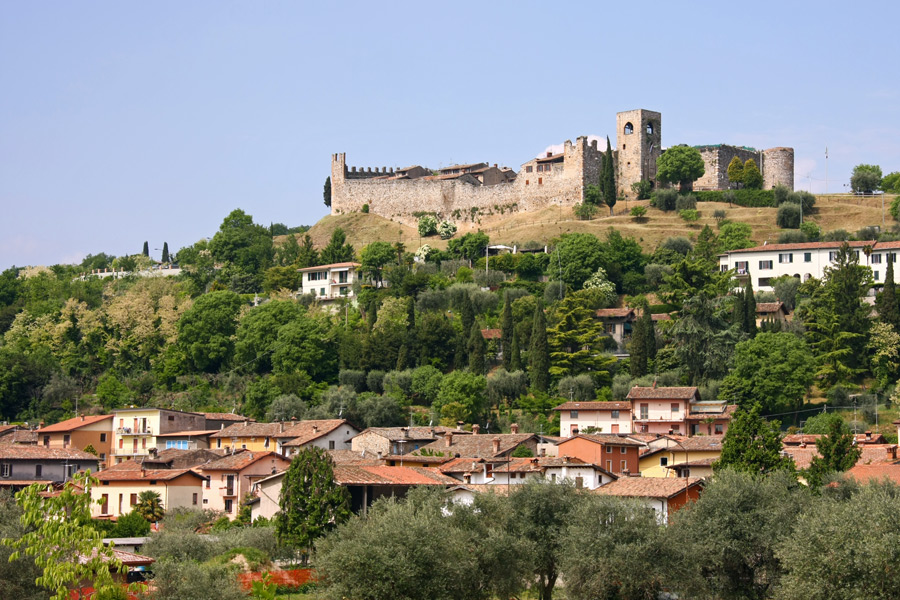
- The castle

- Location within Italy Location within Lombardy
- Coordinates: 45°30′N 10°30′E
- Country: Italy
- Region: Lombardy
- Province: Brescia (BS)
- Frazioni: Calvagese della Riviera, Desenzano del Garda, Lonato del Garda, Moniga del Garda, Soiano del Lago

Government
  - Mayor: Albino Zuliani

Area
  - Total: 20 km^{2} (7.7 sq mi)
- Elevation: 127 m (417 ft)

Population (2017)
  - Total: 4,622
  - Density: 230/km^{2} (600/sq mi)
- Time zone: UTC+1 (CET)
  - Summer (DST): UTC+2 (CEST)
- Postal code: 25080
- Dialing code: 030
- ISTAT code: 017129
- Patron saint: St. Emilian
- Saint day: November 12
- Website: Official website

Padenghe sul Garda is a town and comune in the province of Brescia, in Lombardy. It is situated on the southwest coast of Lake Garda. Neighbouring communes are Calvagese della Riviera, Desenzano del Garda, Lonato del Garda, Moniga del Garda and Soiano del Lago.

== History ==
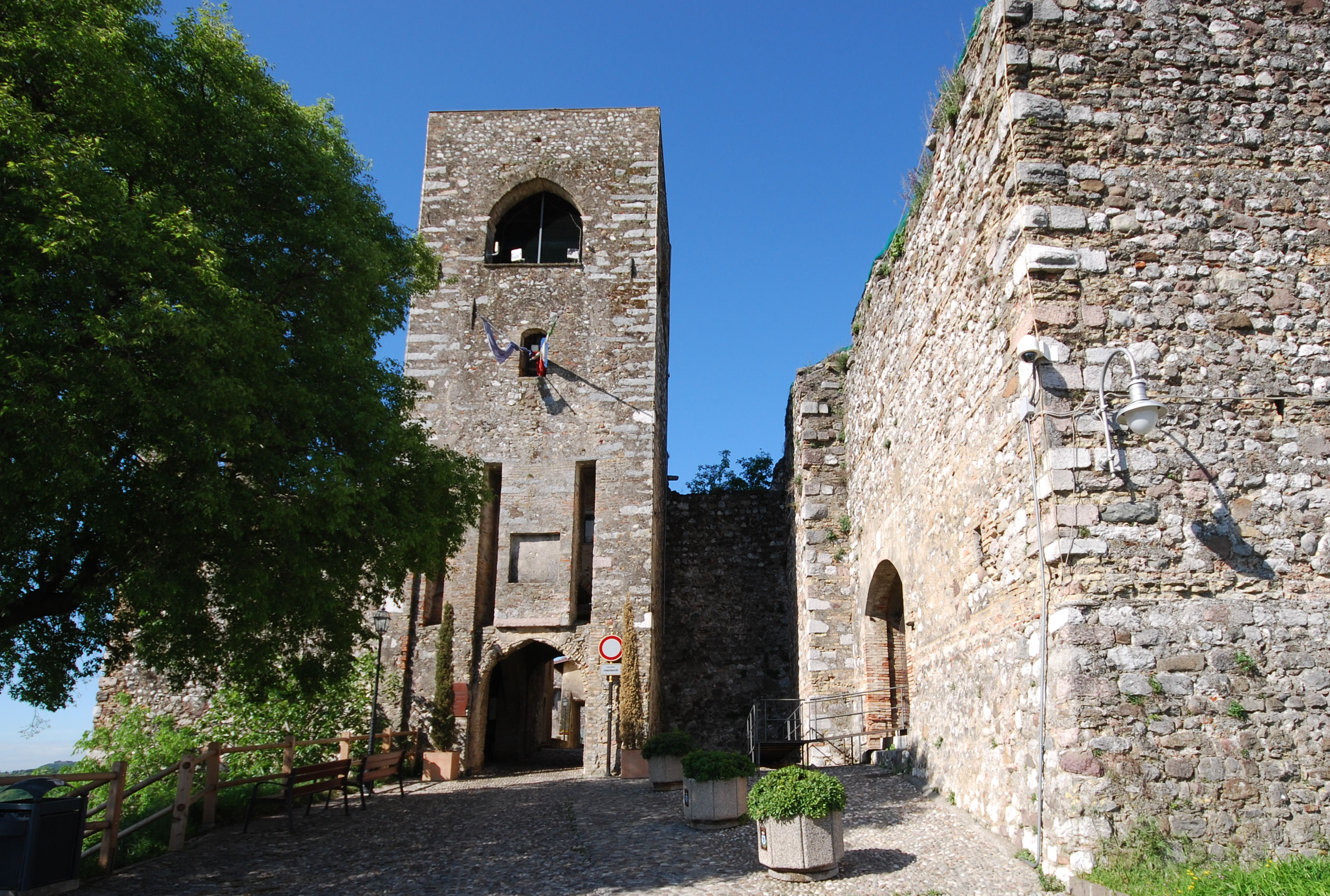
The entrance of the medieval castle.

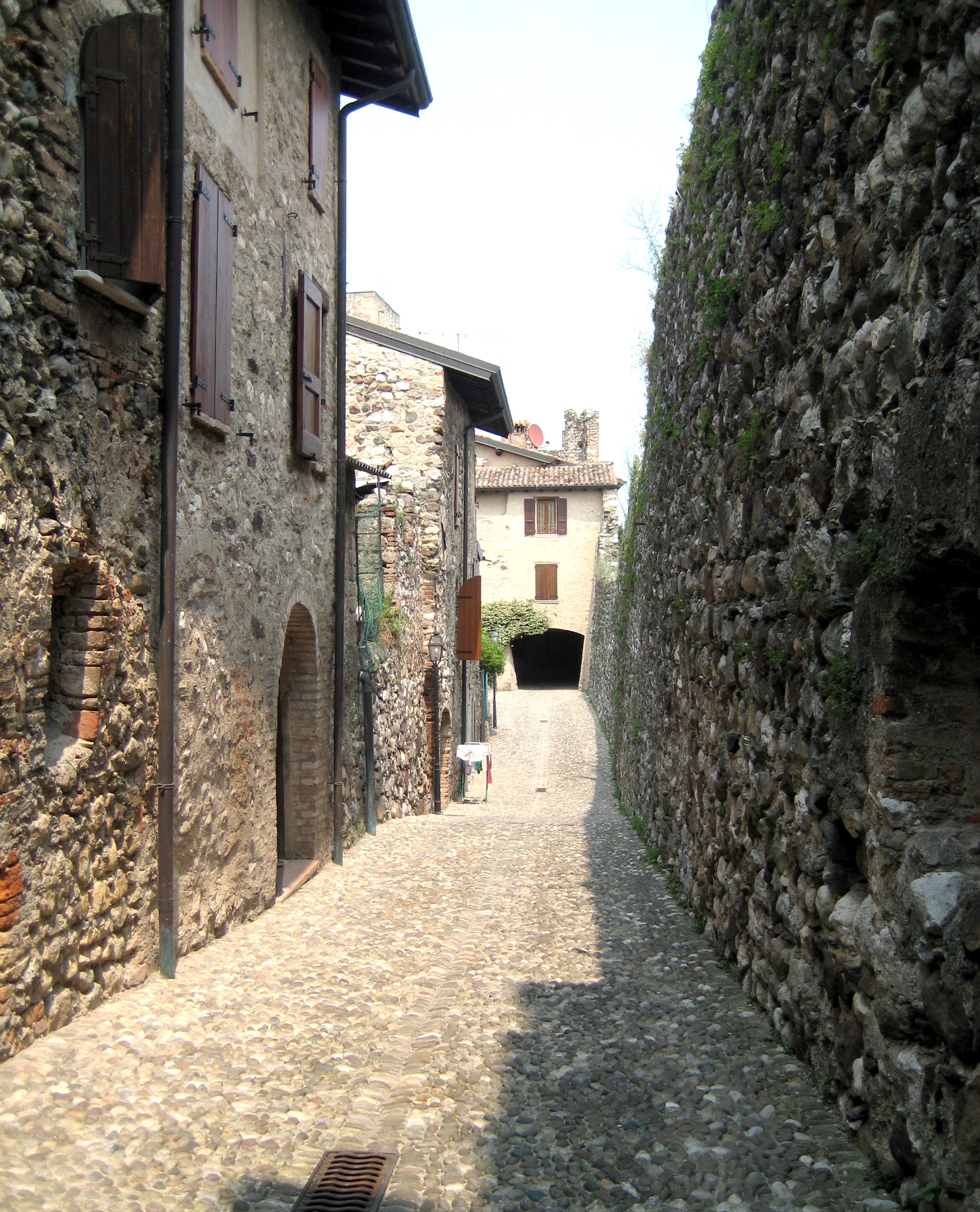
Street in Padenghe.

Traces of prehistoric settlements have been found (arrowheads) in the peat bogs. More recent findings attest to the Roman presence.

In the Christian era Padenghe depended on the Parish of Desenzano and the first church, San Cassiano, was built next to the town center by the lake. This first village was abandoned because of the Hungarian invasions, straddling the 9th and 10th centuries, which forced the inhabitants to fortify a hill, where the castle was erected. In 1154 Padenghe is mentioned in the document with which Frederick Barbarossa, after the Diet of Roncaglia, recognizes the rights of Theobald, Bishop of Verona on certain territories in province of Brescia.

In the Middle Ages, the castle turned it into a Ghibelline fortress and was contested between Brescia and Verona. In 1330 Padenghe was conquered by the Scala family, who were driven by John of Bohemia, son of Henry VII. In 1362, the Cansignorio took the castle, but lost it two years later. At the end of the XIV century the town requested and obtained autonomy from the ruling Visconti. Each country had its own statutes.

In 1414 Pandolfo Malatesta, who was at the beginning of the century signore of Brescia, appointed Drugolo Castle (now in the territory of Lonato) to Padenghe removing it to the family Vimercati to punish rebellion. After the Peace of Lodi (1454), the Venetian Republic held a garrison in the castle of Padenghe.

The macaronic poet Teofilo Folengo, that at the beginning of 1500 stayed in the convent of Maguzzano, called the inhabitants of Padenghe "superb people", and the French, during their rule, had to be afraid of it, though in 1509 the governor ordered the demolition of the castle, avoided by the intervention of Cardinal D'Amboise. In 1513 the Imperial German soldiers subjected to violence and looting. In 1532 Padenghe and other municipalities gravitating around the lower lake at Desenzano, which formed the Quadra di Campagna, they asked, not obtain it, independence from Salò, where the riviera was headed.

At the end of the 16th century the area was run by ruthless bandits, among which is remembered Giacomazzo of Padenghe, born Giacomo Dainese. In Padenghe was also born the painter Giovanni Andrea Bertanza, which inspired his work in Palma il Giovane and Veronese and worked in Valtenesi and the Riviera at the end of the 16th century. It is well to remember the Jesuit Giambattista Rodella (1724–94), a friend of Mazzucchelli, in whose house he lived for 22 years working in the drafting of the Dictionary of the writers of Italy and drafting their own works and translations. Padenghe Zuliani the brothers, who between 700 and 800 gained fame as a jurist and Andrea Francis as a physician, either by being involved in teaching.

During the Italian Resurgence was at Padenghe that the volunteers of Tito Speri took him prisoner, on 28 March 1848, the Austrian general Schonhals, fleeing insurgent Brescia. From 1928 to 1947 it became part of the town of Padenghe Moniga and Soiano, which later acquired autonomy.

== Places ==
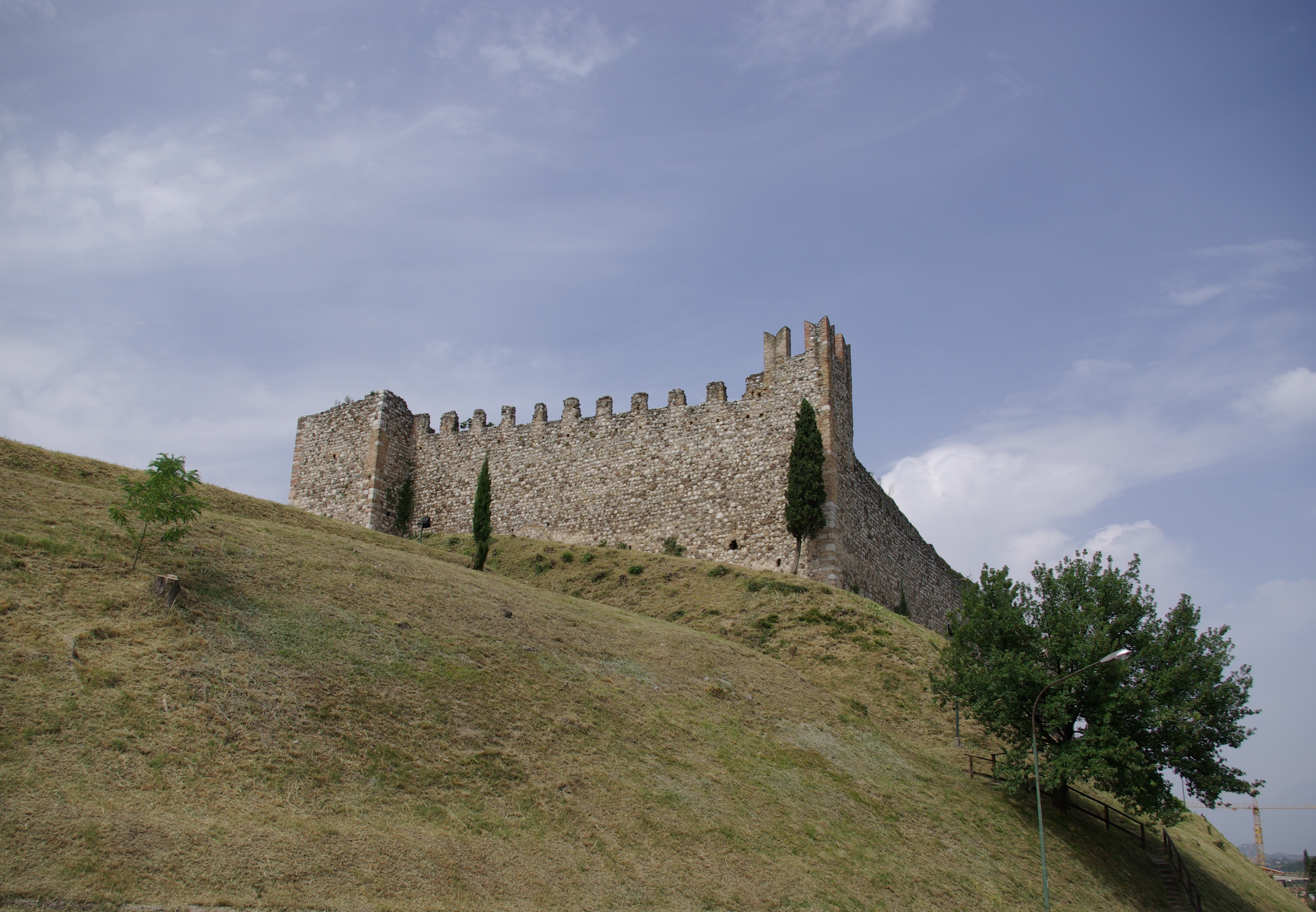
The castle.

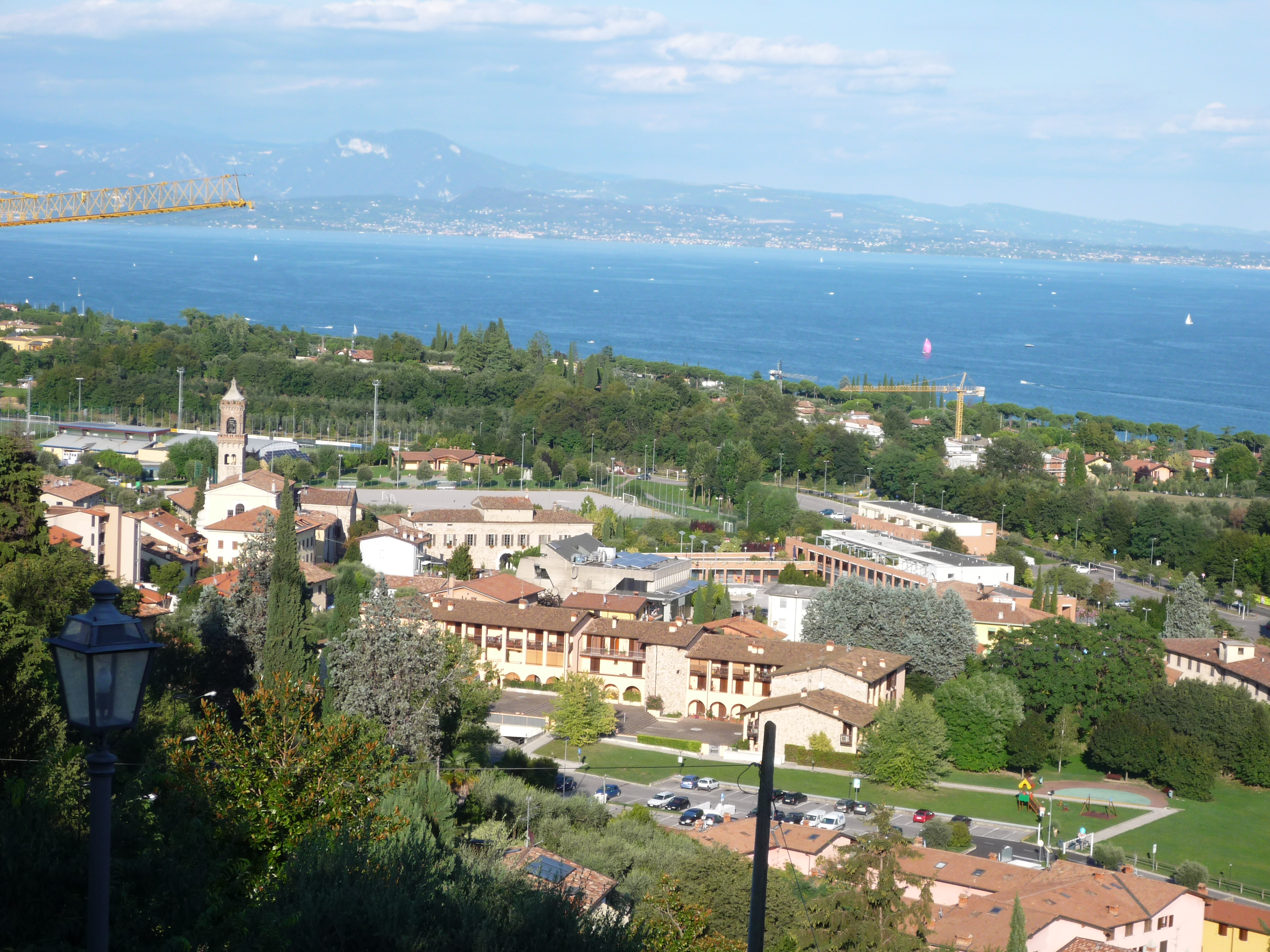
The modern town and the lake seen from the castle.

=== Medieval castle ===
It has preserved its original structure: solid walls of large stones and three towers (the central collapsed) on the north-west. Above the entrance, with traces of openings of the drawbridge and a pedestrian walkway, stands the main tower, square, without battlements. The castle and the garrison lived in castellino, built later in the curtain.

== Municipal government ==
Padenghe is headed by a mayor (sindaco) assisted by a legislative body, the consiglio comunale, and an executive body, the giunta comunale. Since 1995 the mayor and members of the consiglio comunale are directly elected together by resident citizens, while from 1945 to 1995 the mayor was chosen by the legislative body. The giunta comunale is chaired by the mayor, who appoints others members, called assessori. The offices of the comune are housed in a building usually called the municipio or palazzo comunale.

Since 1995 the mayor of Padenghe is directly elected by citizens, originally every four, then every five years.

Mayor	Term start	Term end	Party
Ilio Bazoli	26 May 1985	24 April 1995	PCI
Fabio Beretta	24 April 1995	14 June 1999	PDS
Giancarlo Allegri	14 June 1999	8 June 2009	DS
Patrizia Avanzini	8 June 2009	27 May 2019	PD
Albino Zuliani	27 May 2019	incumbent	FdI
