= Manerba del Garda =

- Comune
- Comune di Manerba del Garda
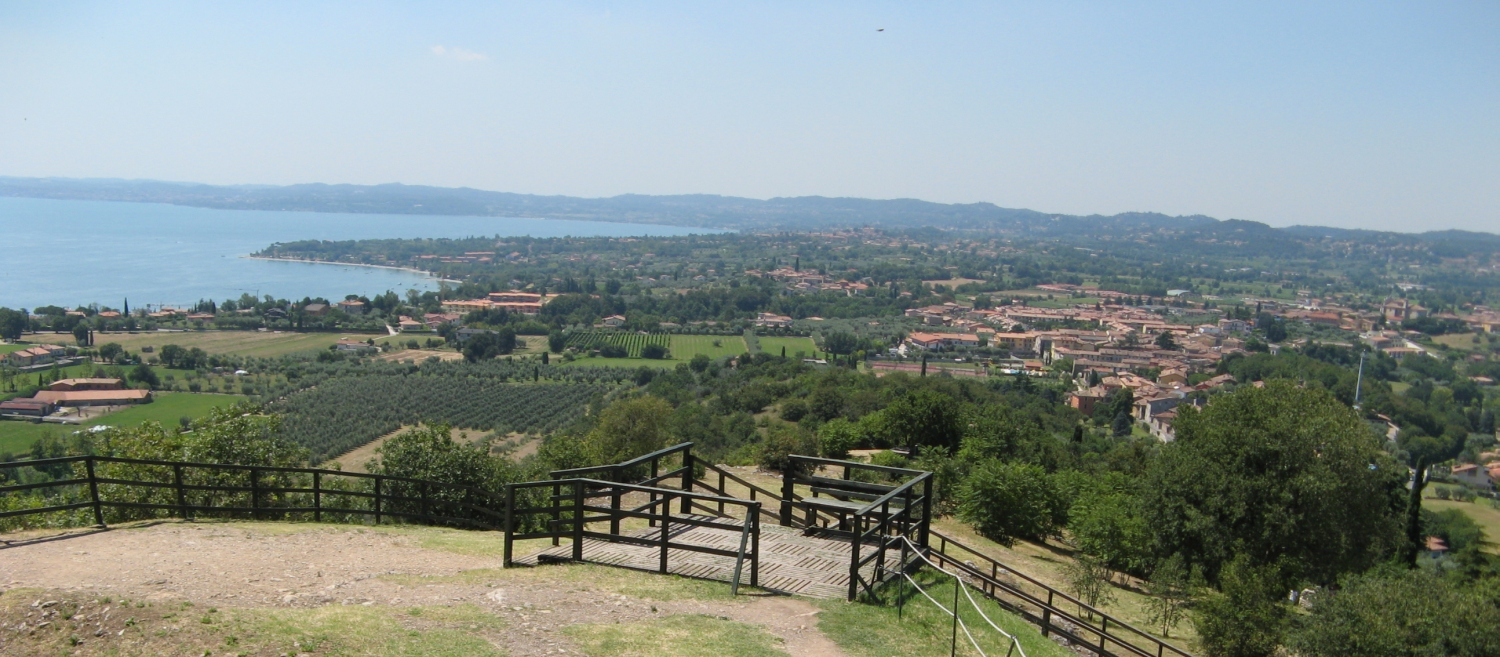
- View of Manerba from the Rocca

- Coat of arms

- Location within Italy Location within Lombardy
- Coordinates: 45°33′N 10°33′E
- Country: Italy
- Region: Lombardy
- Province: Brescia (BS)
- Frazioni: Balbiana, Crociale, Gardoncino, Montinelle, Pieve Vecchia, Solarolo

Government
  - Mayor: Flaviano Mattiotti

Area
  - Total: 28 km^{2} (11 sq mi)
- Elevation: 130 m (430 ft)

Population (2017)
  - Total: 5,363
  - Density: 190/km^{2} (500/sq mi)
- Demonym: Manerbesi
- Time zone: UTC+1 (CET)
  - Summer (DST): UTC+2 (CEST)
- Postal code: 25080
- Dialing code: 0365
- Patron saint: Assumption of Mary
- Saint day: August 15
- Website: Official website

Manerba del Garda is a town and comune in the province of Brescia, in Lombardy. It is located at the southwest side of the Lake Garda.

It is bounded by the comunes of San Felice del Benaco, Puegnago sul Garda, Moniga del Garda, Polpenazze del Garda and Soiano del Lago. Manerba del Garda is divided into the seven hamlets of Solarolo, Montinelle, Balbiana, Pieve, Trevisago, Campagnola and Gardoncino.

== History ==
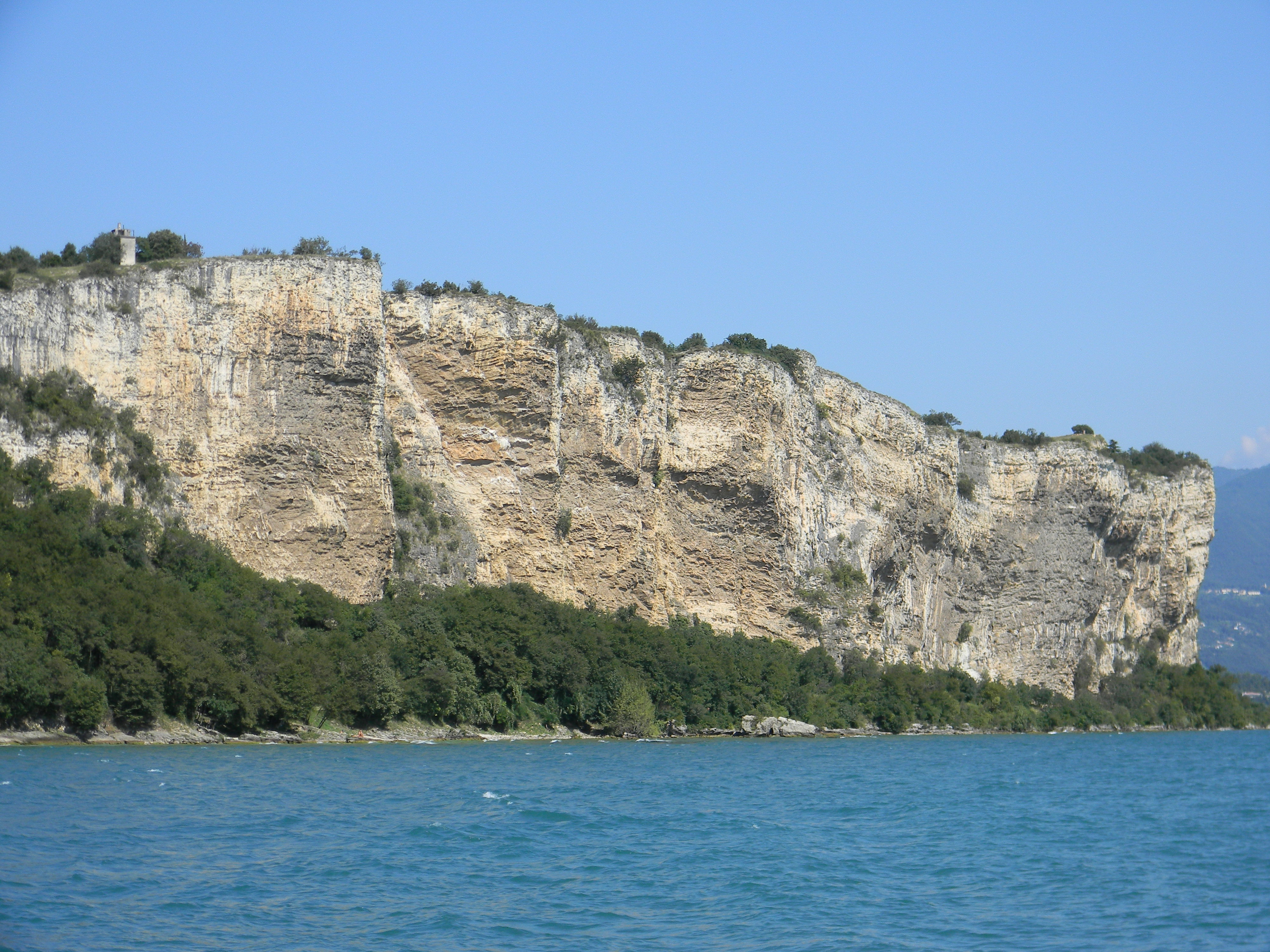
Cliff of Manerba.

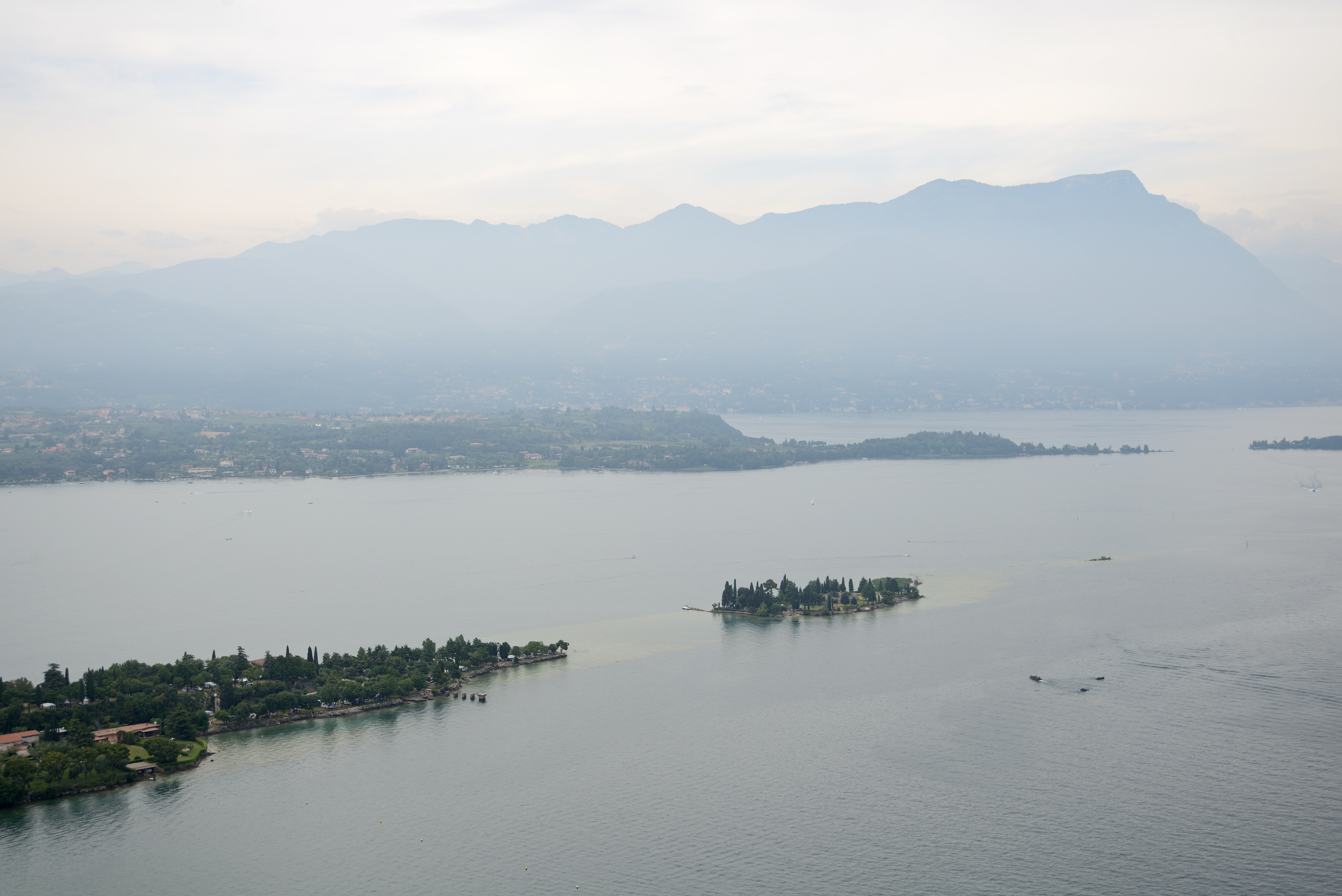
Bay of Manerba with San Biagio Island well known as the Rabbits' Island.

Manerba was founded, according to the legend, in devotion to the goddess Minerva. Other historians trace the name to the Gauls Cenomani, stemming from the union of the terms mon, leader, and erb, a military zone, identifying Manerba as residence of the chief of the tribe. A charter of Frederick II dating from 1 November 1221 mentions the territory surrounding the ancient Church of Manerba as Tenense, whence its current name, Valtenesi.

The presence of man in the Garda area goes back to prehistoric times: in the Manerba area are remains of a Mesolithic village, while under natural terrace located in the foothills of the Rocca (castle) are traces of a Neolithic settlement from between 4,500 and 4,000 BC, and an important necropolis dating from the Copper Age.

The Valtenesi saw the construction of several castles starting from the 13th century AD, some of which erected on the ruins of Roman forts. The tower of the castle in the center of Manerba represents the convergence point of a radial pattern that connects the towers of all the municipalities around. This is the oldest castle in the Valtenesi, built in the 12th/13th centuries on the ruins of a medieval fortress and of a settlement dating to the Iron Age, and is firmly anchored on the Manerba cliffs hanging over the southern basin of Lake Garda.

== Main sights ==
Manerba is home to several prehistoric pile-dwellings (or stilt house) settlements that are part of the Prehistoric Pile dwellings around the Alps UNESCO World Heritage Site.

Manerba houses the Rocca di Manerba del Garda which is characterized by several archaeological sites.

== Municipal government ==
Manerba is headed by a mayor (sindaco) assisted by a legislative body, the consiglio comunale, and an executive body, the giunta comunale. Since 1995 the mayor and members of the consiglio comunale are directly elected together by resident citizens, while from 1945 to 1995 the mayor was chosen by the legislative body. The giunta comunale is chaired by the mayor, who appoints others members, called assessori. The offices of the comune are housed in a building usually called the municipio or palazzo comunale.

Since 1995 the mayor of Manerba is directly elected by citizens, originally every four, then every five years. The current mayor is Flaviano Mattiotti (FI), elected on 26 May 2019 with the 53.4% of the votes and re-elected on 10 June 2024 with 74% of the votes.

Mayor	Term start	Term end	Party
Isidoro Bertini	24 April 1995	14 June 2004	FI
Maria Speziani	14 June 2004	8 June 2009	FI
Paolo Mariantonio Simoni	8 June 2009	26 May 2014	LN
Isidoro Bertini	26 May 2014	27 May 2019	FI
Flaviano Mattiotti	27 May 2019	incumbent	FI

== Gallery ==
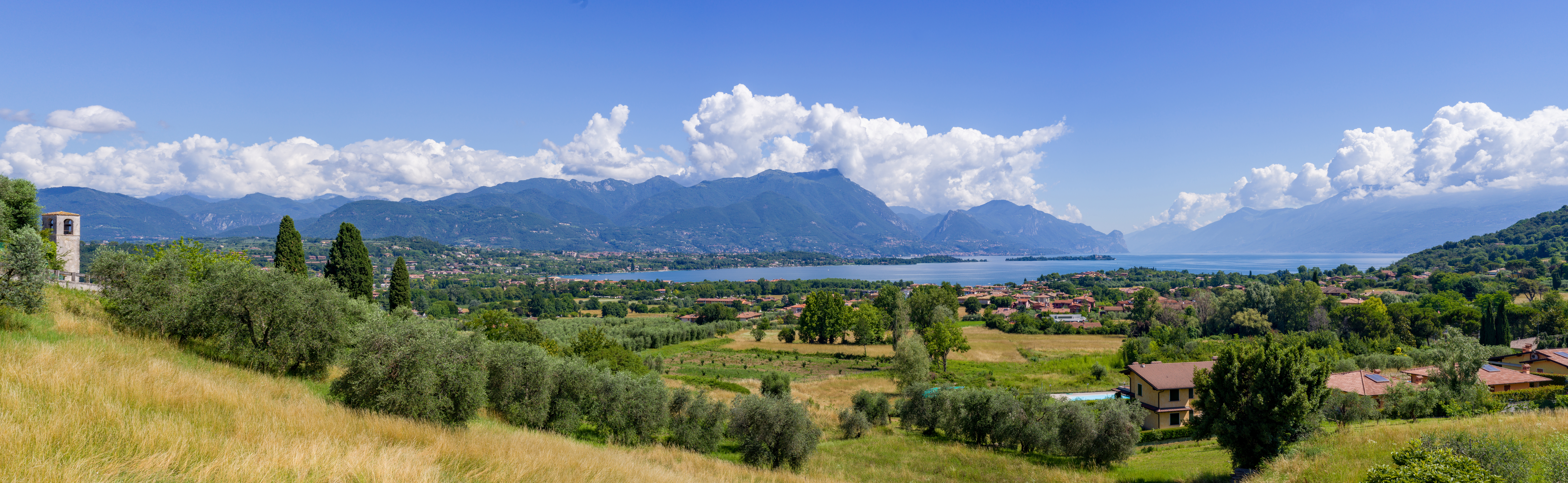

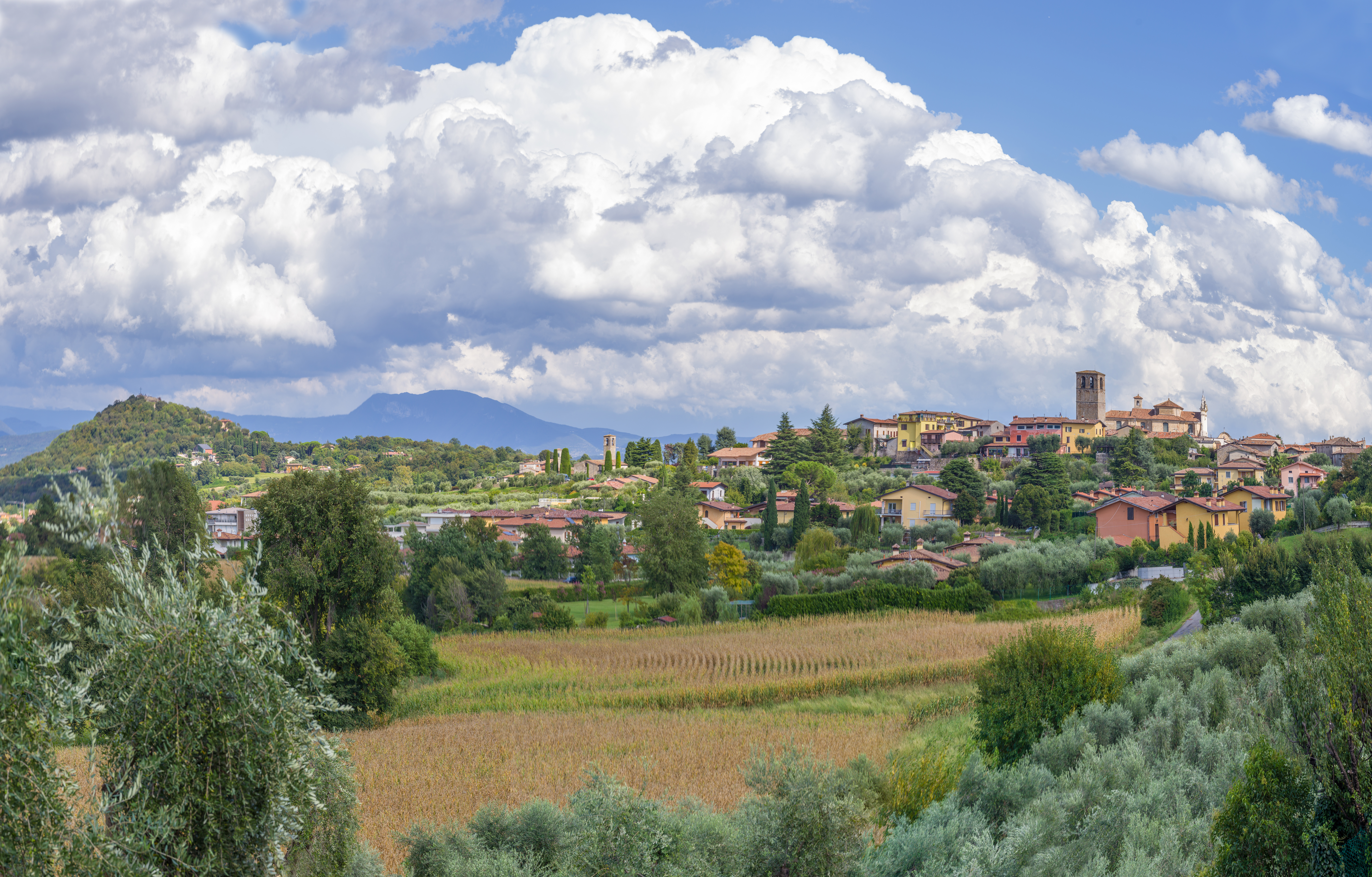

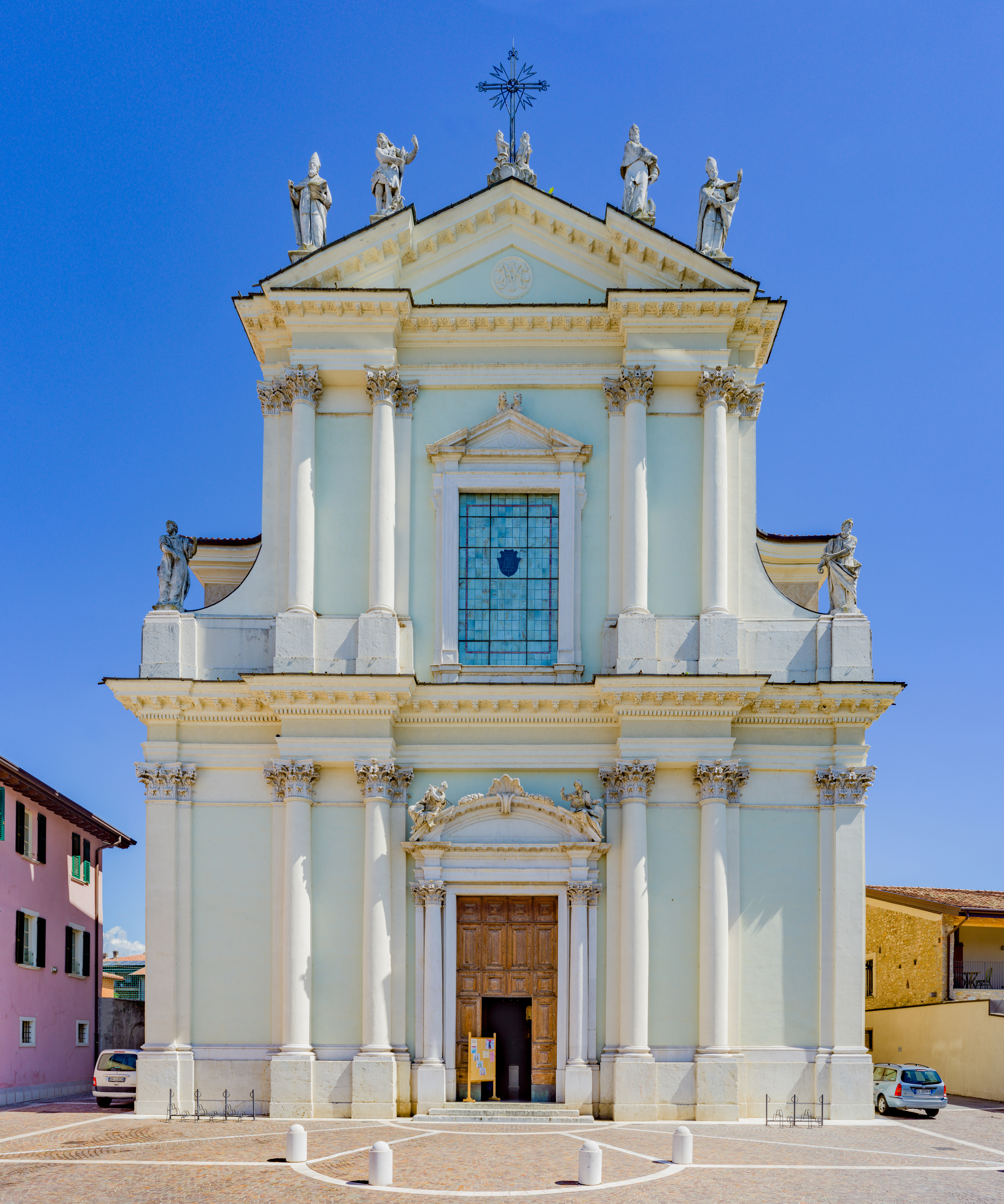

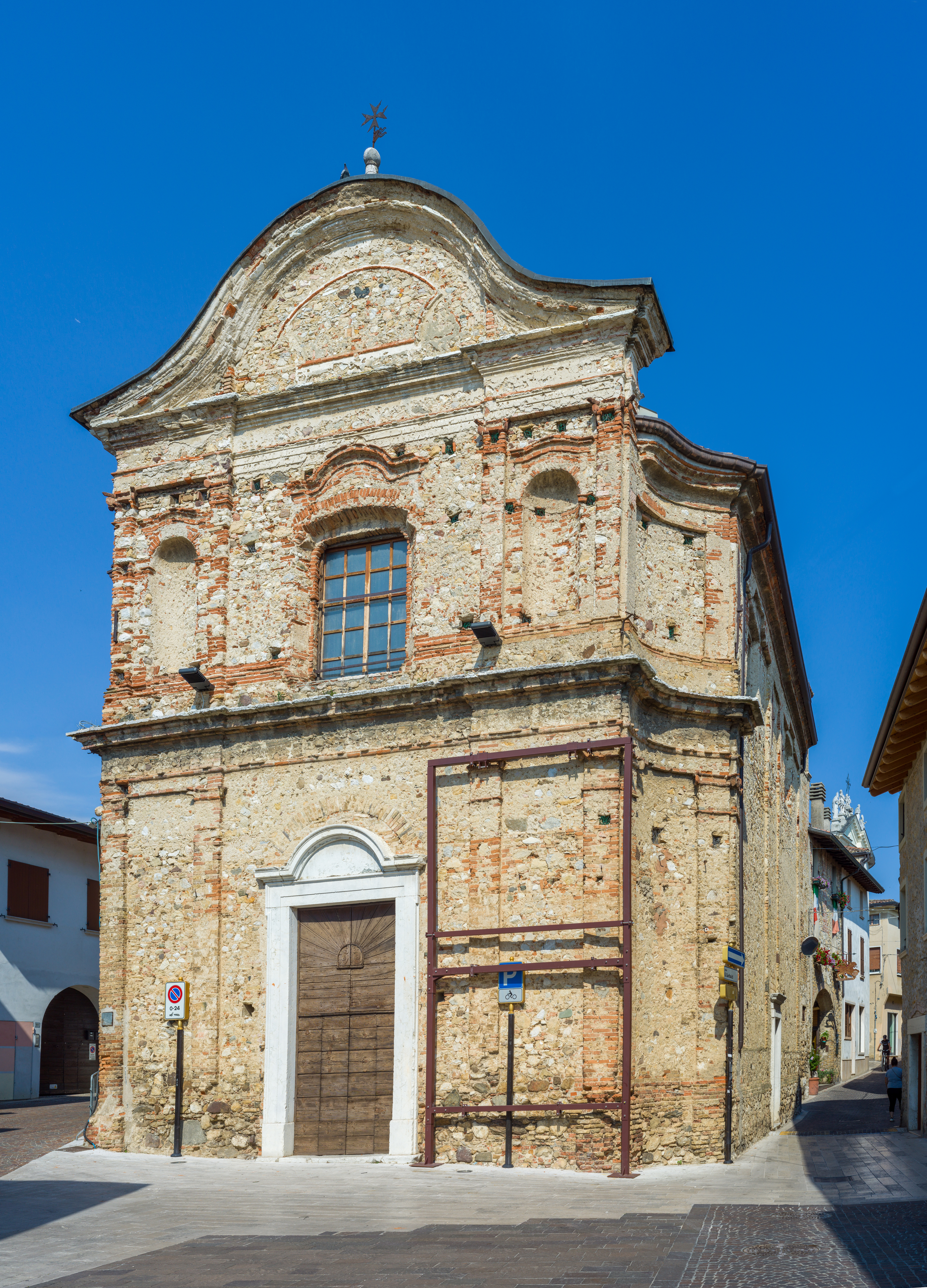

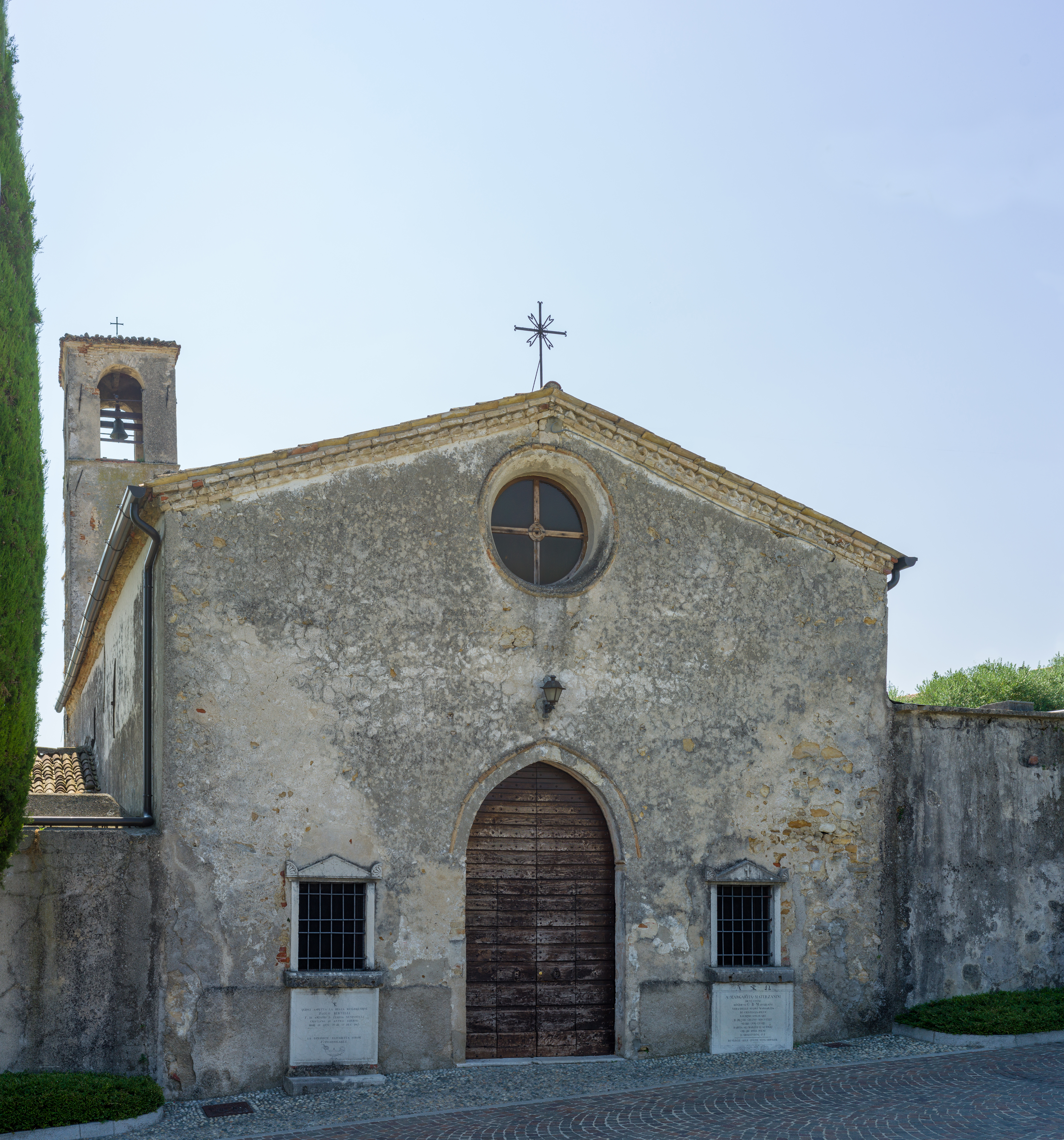

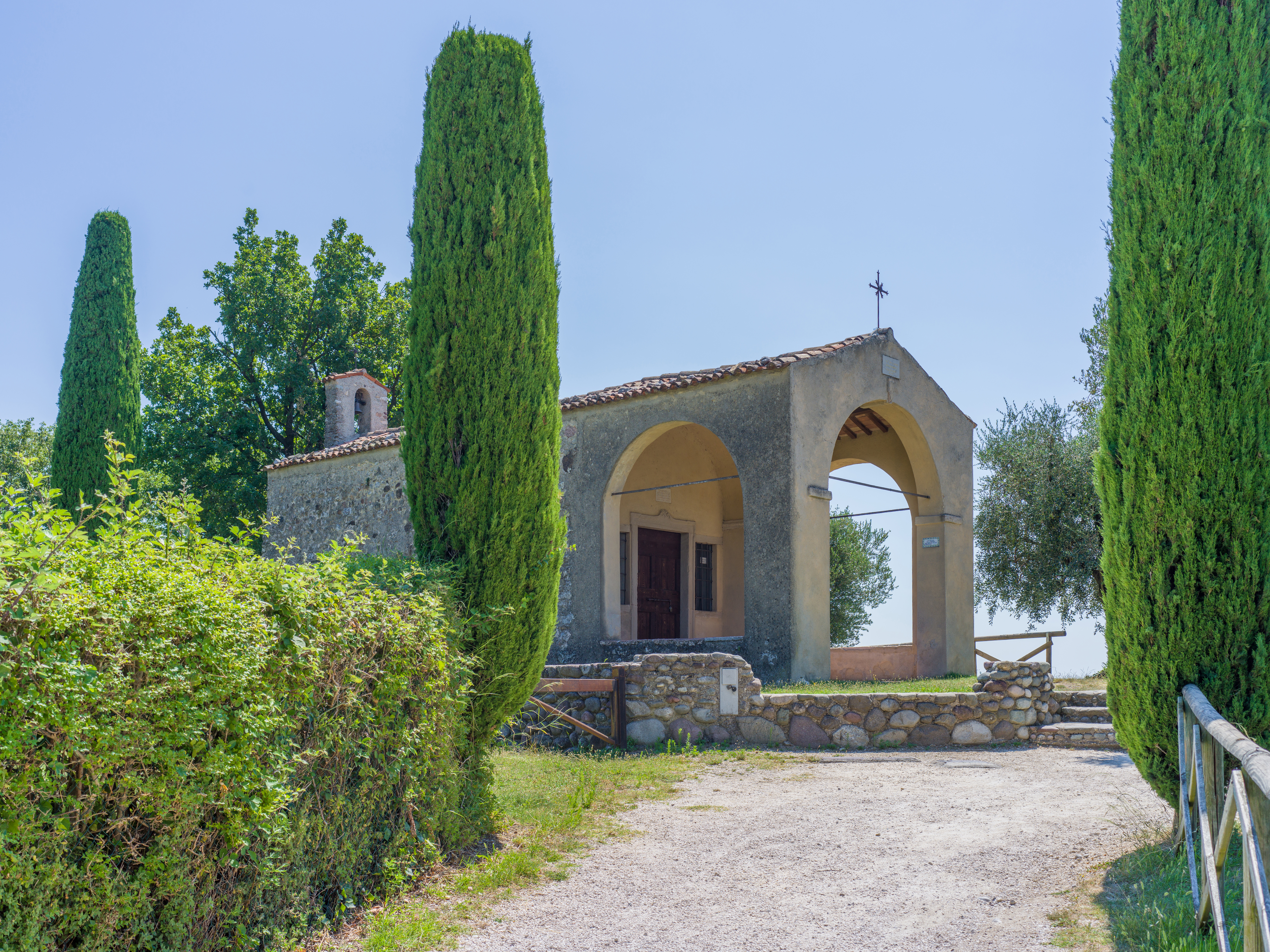

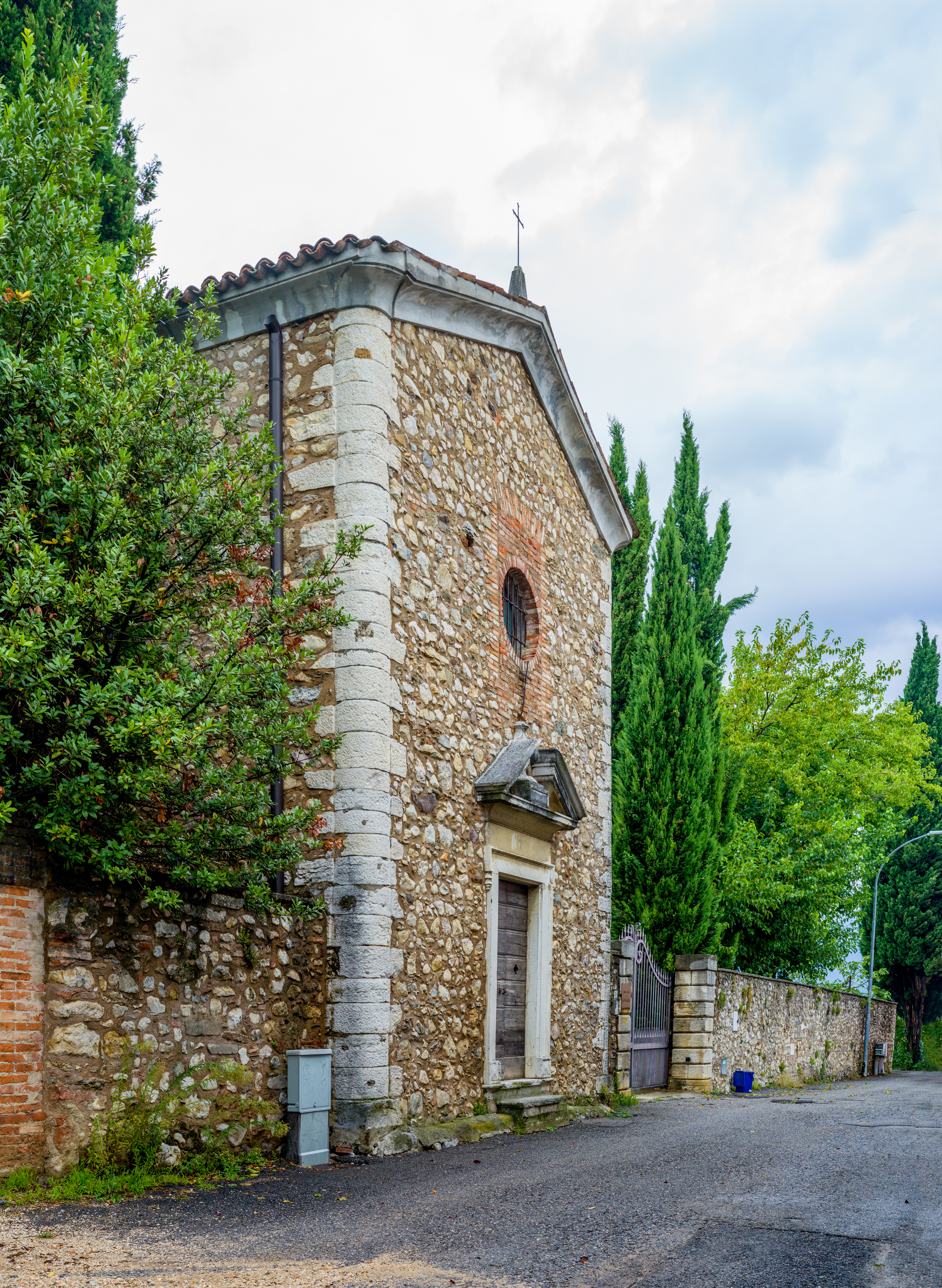
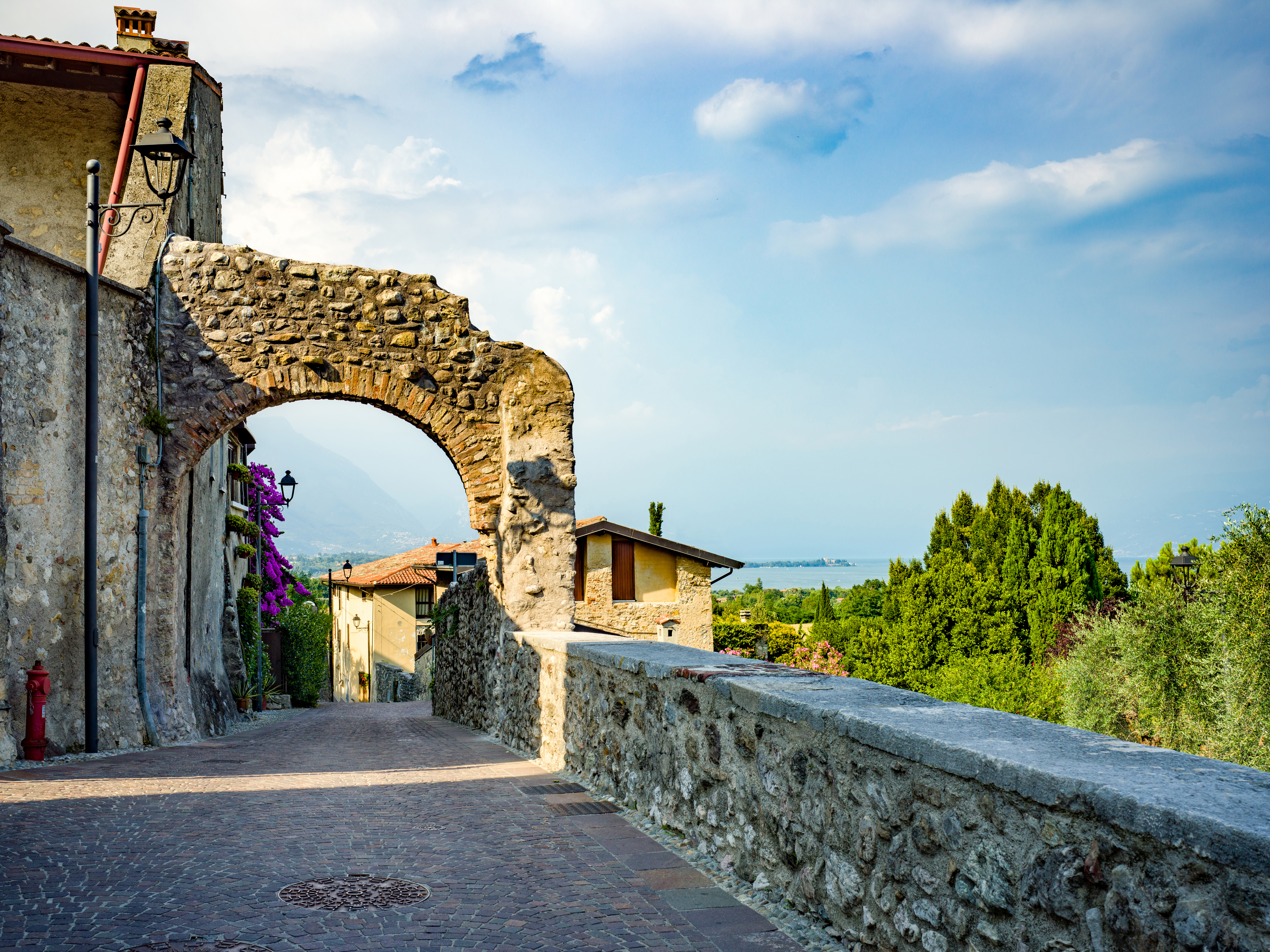

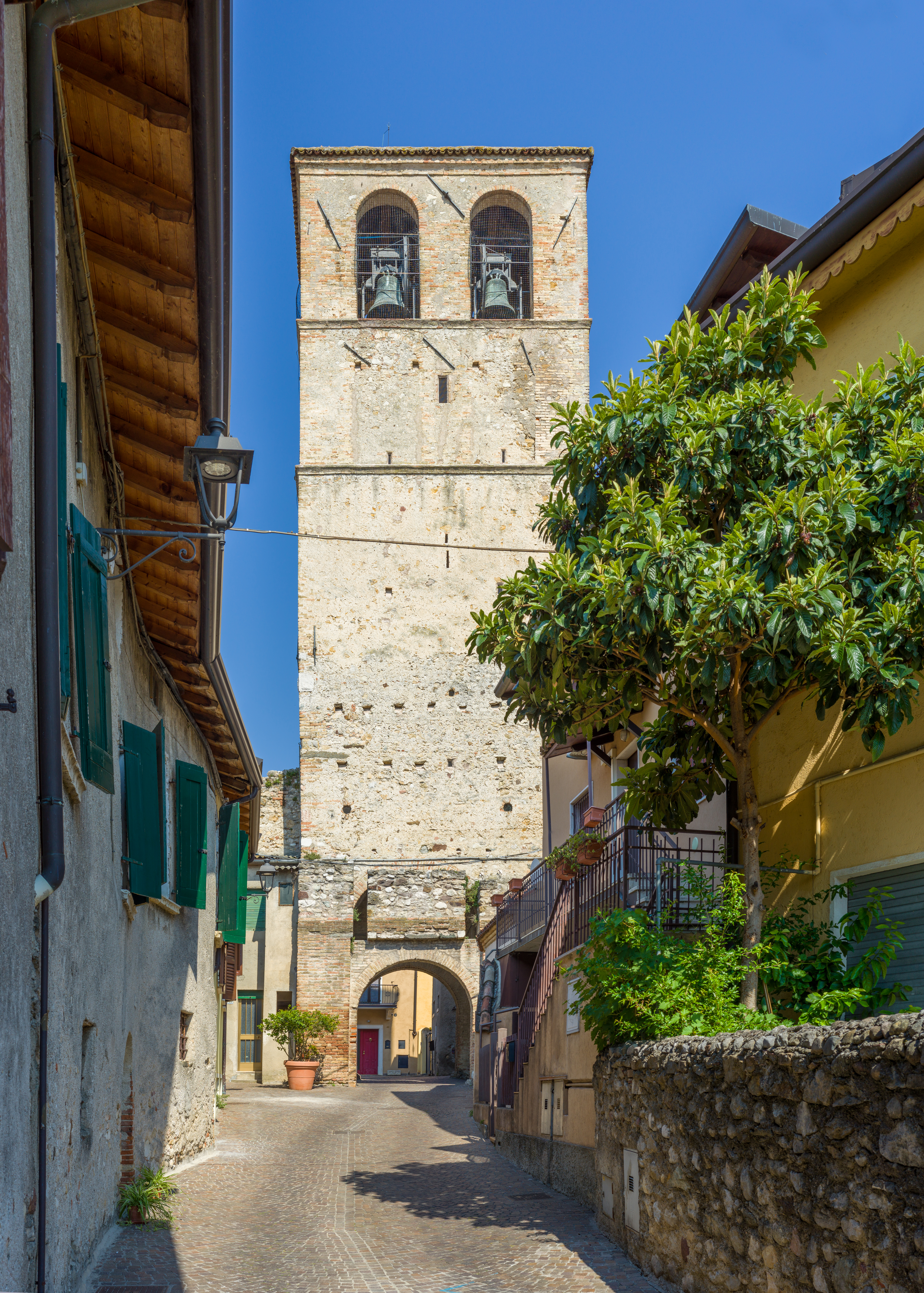

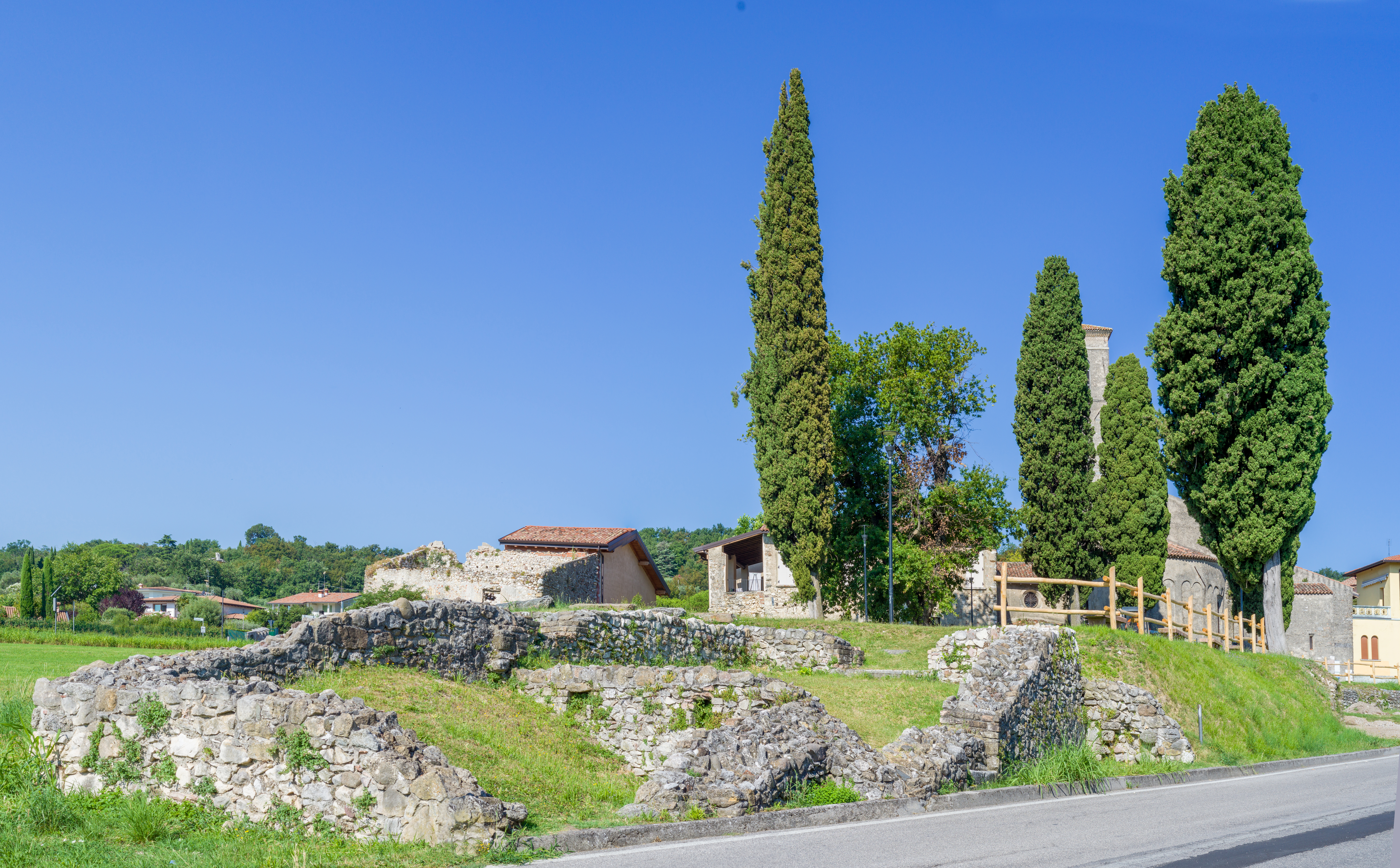

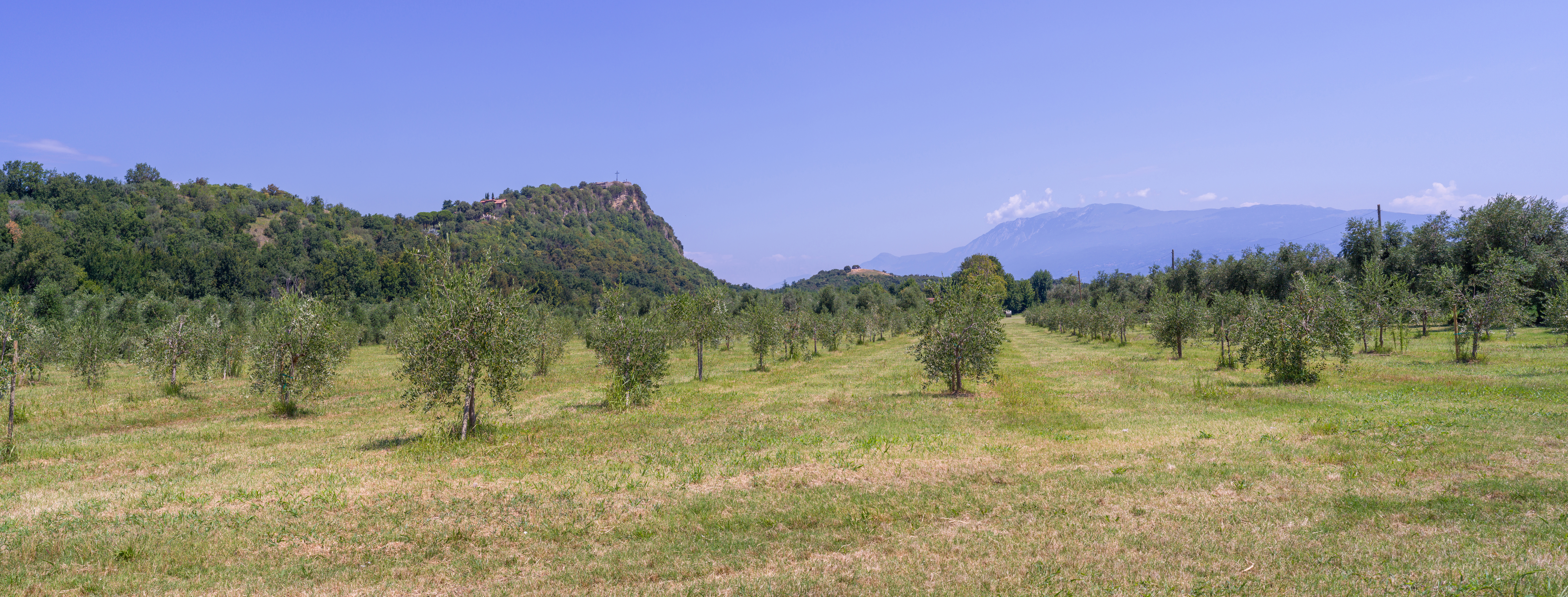

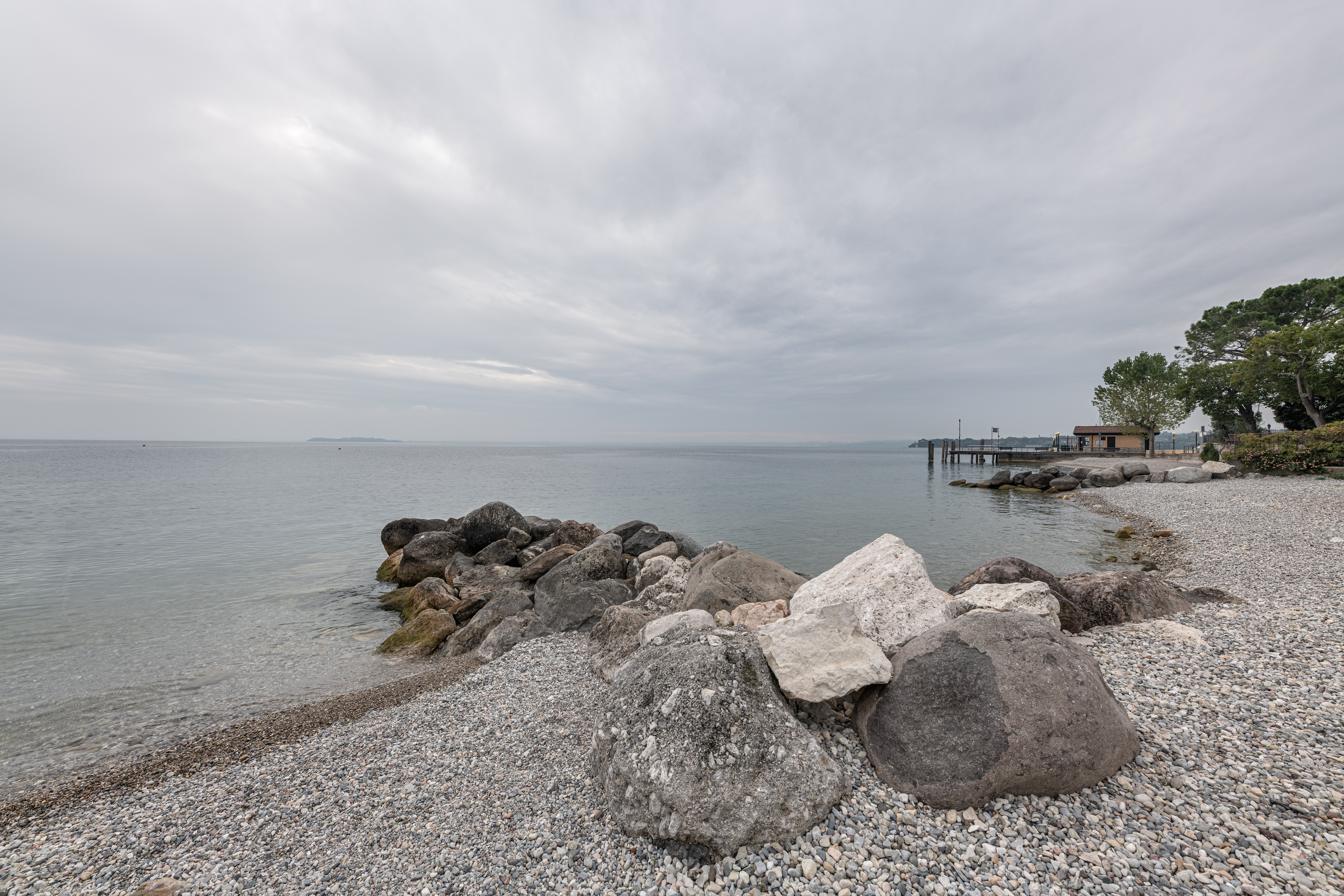

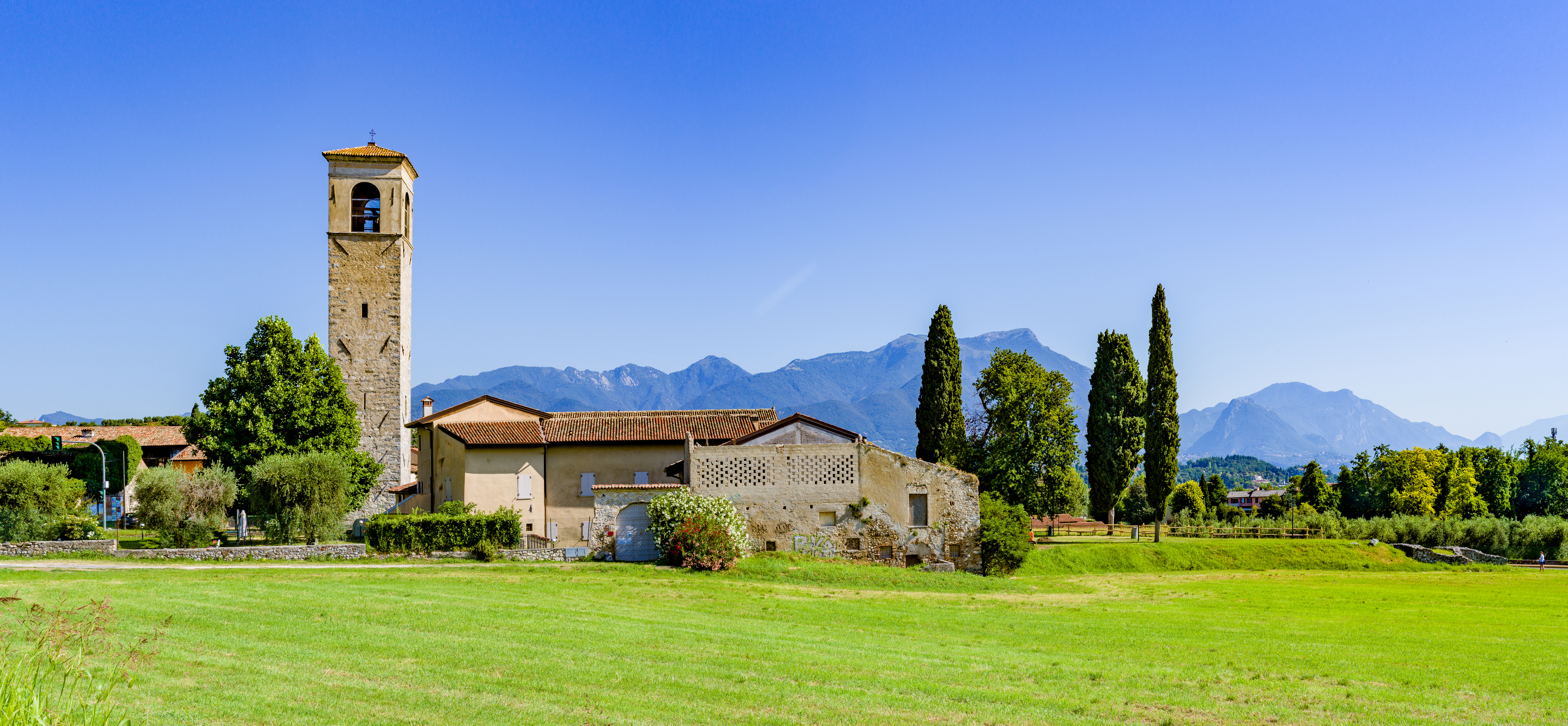

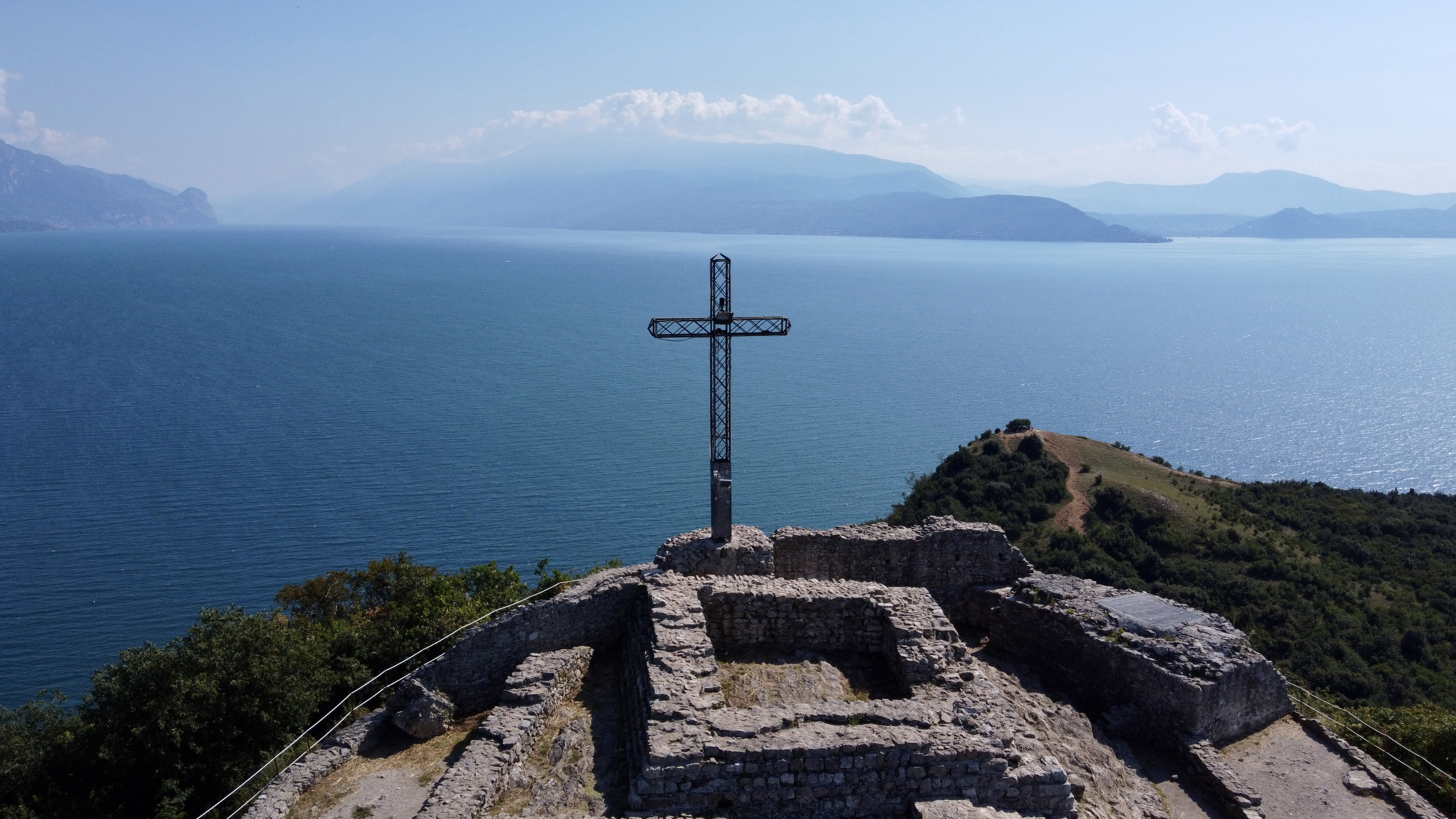
