= Soiano del Lago =

- Comune
- Comune di Soiano del Lago
- Location within Italy Location within Lombardy
- Coordinates: 45°31′N 10°31′E
- Country: Italy
- Region: Lombardy
- Province: Brescia (BS)
- Frazioni: Calvagese della Riviera, Manerba del Garda, Moniga del Garda, Padenghe sul Garda, Polpenazze del Garda

Area
  - Total: 5 km^{2} (1.9 sq mi)

Population (2011)
  - Total: 1,898
  - Density: 380/km^{2} (980/sq mi)
- Time zone: UTC+1 (CET)
  - Summer (DST): UTC+2 (CEST)
- Postal code: 25080
- Dialing code: 0365
- ISTAT code: 017180
- Website: Official website

Soiano del Lago (Gardesano: Soià) is a comune in the province of Brescia, in Lombardy.
