= Moniga del Garda =

- Comune
- Comune di Moniga del Garda
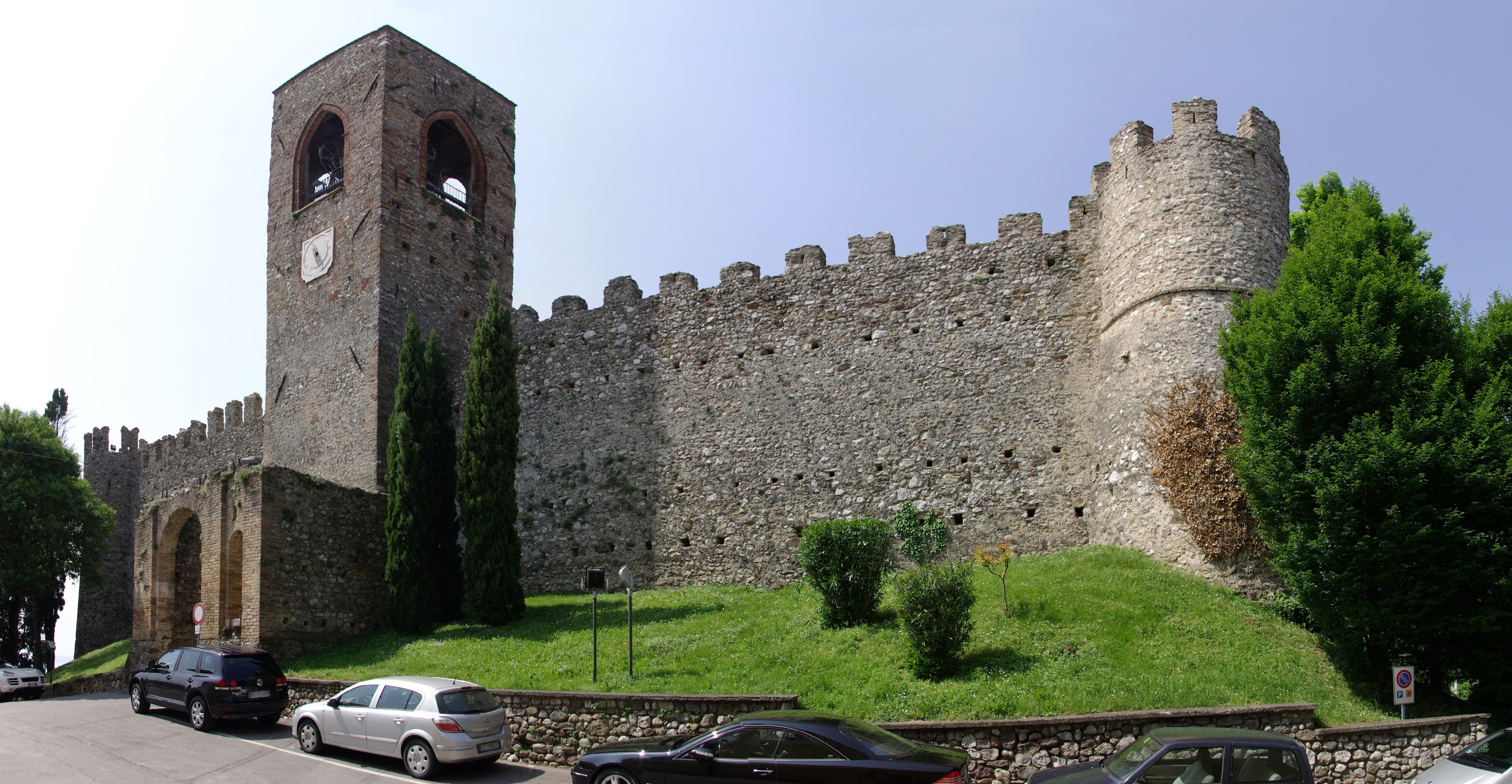
- The Castle of Moniga

- Coat of arms

- Location within Italy Location within Lombardy
- Coordinates: 45°31′37.92″N 10°32′20.76″E
- Country: Italy
- Region: Lombardy
- Province: Brescia (BS)

Government
  - Mayor: Renato Marcoli (PD)

Area
  - Total: 14.65 km^{2} (5.66 sq mi)
- Elevation: 125 m (410 ft)

Population (31 July 2021)
  - Total: 2,556
  - Density: 174.5/km^{2} (451.9/sq mi)
- Demonym: Monighesi
- Time zone: UTC+1 (CET)
  - Summer (DST): UTC+2 (CEST)
- Postal code: 25080
- Dialing code: 0365
- Patron saint: St. Martin
- Saint day: November 11
- Website: Official website

Moniga del Garda (Gardesano: Mùniga) is a town and comune in the province of Brescia, in the Italian region Lombardy. The municipality, located on the southwest side of Lake Garda, is bounded by other communes of Padenghe sul Garda, Manerba del Garda and Soiano del Lago.

== History ==
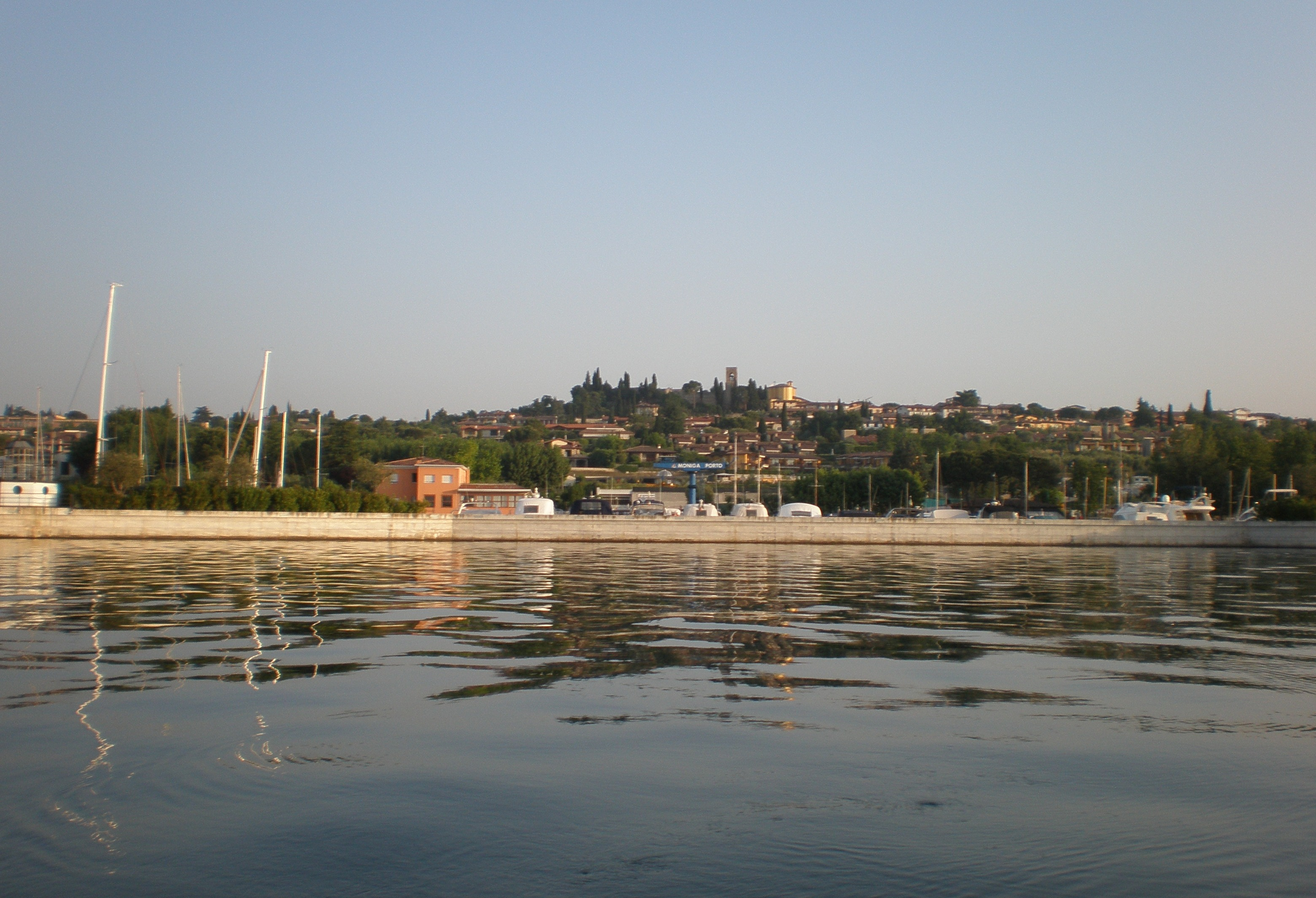
Moniga and its harbor seen from the lake.

Thanks to the remains of a pile-dwelling village it has been possible to ascertain that this area was already populated during the Early Bronze Age (1800–200 BC).

In the second half of the 12th century it became a feud of Ugone da Poncarale and in 1196 it was donated to the monks of Leno. Moniga was subjected to a series of rules, among which that by the Republic of Venice and subsequently the Austrian Empire, with which it belonged until 1859.

From 1928 to 1947 it became a part of the Commune of Padenghe. Its unusual name is believed to come from that of the goddess Diana Muchina, who, according to the legend, was said to have a sanctuary in the area.

== Culture ==
Chiaretto, a rosé wine of a light cherry colour, owes its creation to local citizen Pompeo Molmenti, who dedicated his attention intensively to the cultivation of vines and wine on his estate in 1896. Moniga dedicates one events a year to this wine, the "Italia in Rosa" fair, held in June.
