= History of Gottolengo =

History of the municipality of Gottolengo, Italy

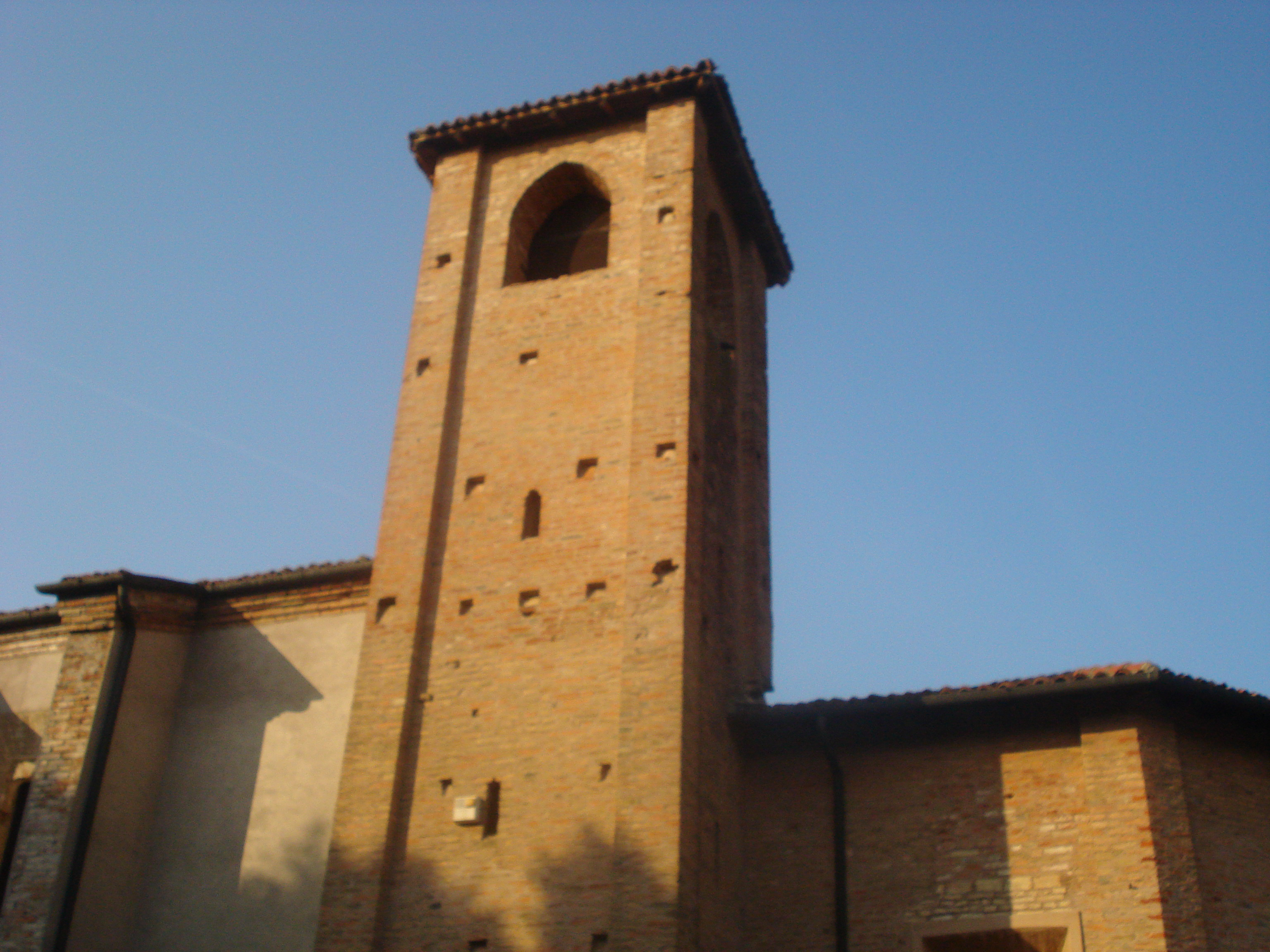
The brick bell tower of the 15th-century Carmelite complex of St. Jerome.

The history of Gottolengo, an Italian municipality located in the Lower Brescian area not far from the borders with the provinces of Cremona and Mantua, can be traced back to as early as the 3rd millennium BC, although the present town was born only in Roman times and then developed over the following centuries.

In early medieval times the history of the town was closely linked to the presence of the Benedictine monastery of Leno, then Gottolengo came under the control of powerful local families and, later, of the Republic of Venice.

With the advent of Napoleon, Gottolengo was part of the Cisalpine Republic and, after its fall, of Lombardy-Venetia; in 1861 it was finally united to the nascent Kingdom of Italy, following its subsequent historical events.

== Antiquity ==
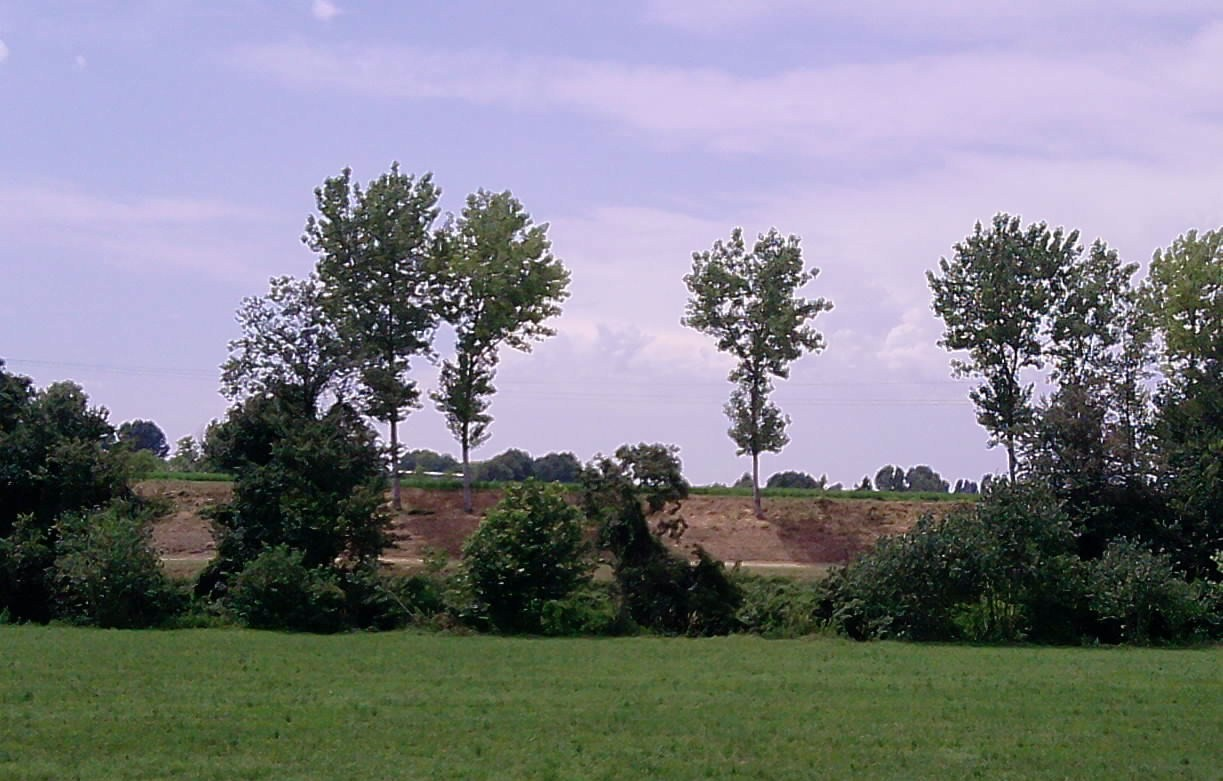
The rise of Castellaro, "cradle" of Gottolengo's history

The territory of Gottolengo began to be populated from about 2000 B.C., as evidenced by the inhabited settlements brought to light on the so-called "Castellaro" (toponym composed of the Gallic terms cashr and teiher, meaning fortification), an area at the southern edge of the present urban center, consisting of a modest plateau surrounded by water and marshes. That terracing, which was easily defensible, favored the settlement of stable communities devoted to agriculture and animal husbandry and capable of practicing archaic forms of weaving. In addition to rudimentary lithic objects, the finds unearthed at the site also include specimens of furnishings, pottery and weapons, both made of stone and bronze.

For reasons not yet well understood, probably due to plagues or invasions and wars, the Castellaro was gradually abandoned since 1000 B.C. in favor of an area a little further north, where the present town of Gottolengo now stands. According to an ancient legend, an underground tunnel would have ensured connections between the two localities even in case of armed clashes or raids. At the end of the 5th century B.C. or at the beginning of the following century, (Note: As evidenced by the numerous archaeological artifacts (weapons especially) found in this area and now preserved, at least in part, inside the renovated "tower house.") the Celtic people of the Cenomani settled there, who were expanding in the Lower Brescian area and who based their economy on ironworking, agriculture and livestock breeding. This ethnic group, residing in scattered villages, began to give its own names to localities in the area and was the first to introduce forms of coinage in the area. (Note: On the subject one can refer to the studies of Ermanno Arslan and, in particular, Saggio di repertorio dei ritrovamenti di moneta celtica padana in Italia e in Europa e di moneta celtica non padana in Italia (testo aggiornato on line).) The Cenomani then came into contact with other peoples: the Insubres, Veneti and, in the second half of the 3rd century B.C., with the Romans. The latter implemented a policy of integration toward the Celts (whom they called Gauls). The territory of Gottolengo came under their final hegemony only in 196 BC, after a coalition of Romans and Veneti defeated the Cenomani forcing them into an alliance with the victors.

The Romanization process (introduction of the Latin language, Roman law, and various political and military institutions) culminated in 49 BC with Caesar's granting of Roman citizenship to the Cenomani and other peoples of northern Italy. Under the control of the municipium of Brixia, a city falling under the X Regio, Gottolengo did not change its agricultural vocation while it adapted its way of life to that developed in different parts of the empire.

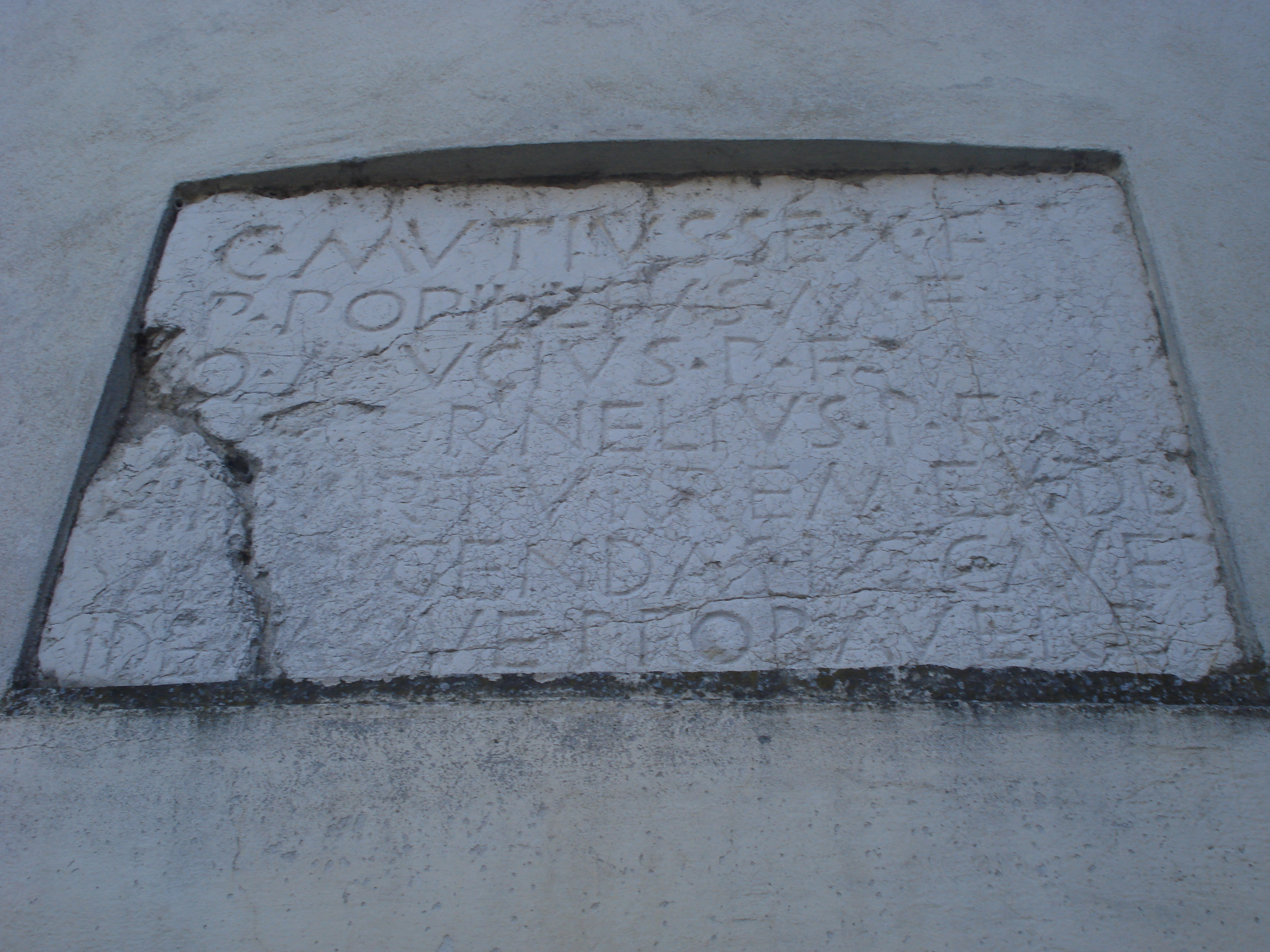
The Lapid of the Quattuorviri, a Roman inscription currently located outside the apse of the parish church of Saints Peter and Paul.

The unearthed finds present numerous testimonies and traces of the Roman presence: coins (of particular importance is a collection discovered in 1900 in a cultivated field south of the town), pottery, artifacts, and epigraphs, including the so-called Lapid of the Quattuorviri (the four supreme municipal magistrates) from the 1st century AD. Following is the text of this inscription:

C(aius) MVTIVS SEX(ti) F(ilius)
P(ublius) POPILLIVS M(arci) F(ilius)
Q(uintus) MVCIVS P(ubli) F(ilius)
M(arcus) CORNELIVS P(ubli) F(ilius)
IIIIVIR(i) TURREM EX D(ecreto) D(ecurionum)
AD AVGENDAS LOCAVER(e)
IDEMQVE PROBAVERE
Caius Mutius son of Sextus
Publius Popillius son of Marcus
Quintus Mucius son of Publius
Marcus Cornelius son of Publius
quattuorviri by decurion decree
by increment they placed this tower
and they themselves put it to the test

It refers to a Roman tower of which nothing is known (perhaps it was located in a municipium such as Brixia or Cremona), while for the plaque itself it has been assumed that it was already walled up in the old parish church, later torn down and rebuilt in the 18th century still reinserting the inscription outside the new apse.

== Middle Ages ==
=== Early ===
Origin of the name

The place name Gottolengo almost certainly derives from Gothic-Lombard forms, as evidenced by the root Gott-, undoubtedly of Gothic origin, while the suffix in "-engo" is typically Lombard. On the other hand, derivation from Germanic dialects, especially Lombard, is particularly widespread in the toponymy of the surrounding area.
Gottolengo presumably means "territory belonging to the village."
This name first appears in the Diploma of Berengar II to the abbot of Leno in 958.

At the fall of the Western Roman Empire, Gottolengo experienced the domination of various barbarian populations, including that of the Lombards, who, after conquering the territory in a not entirely peaceful manner, left their mark on it and incorporated it into the Duchy of Brescia (second half of the 6th century). Desiderius, the last Lombard ruler and a native of Brescia, with the help of his wife Ansa had founded the women's monastery of San Salvatore (later Santa Giulia), in 758 had a men's abbey erected in the neighboring town of Leno, entrusting it to the Benedictines. Having arrived from Montecassino, the monks imprinted not only on the Leno Abbey, but on the whole territory of Lower Brescia that depended on it, a fervor of religious, cultural and economic rebirth by initiating a vast work of land reclamation.

With the fall of Lombard power and the establishment of Frankish hegemony in Italy, the prestige of the monastery further increased thanks to the protection accorded to it by Charlemagne (and later his successors), a fierce defender of Christianity. From then on, the constant policy of the abbots of St. Benedict of Leno was to maintain or procure the favor of emperors and popes, so that over the centuries, through special contracts (bulls or diplomas), the monastery went on to increase its power and possessions.

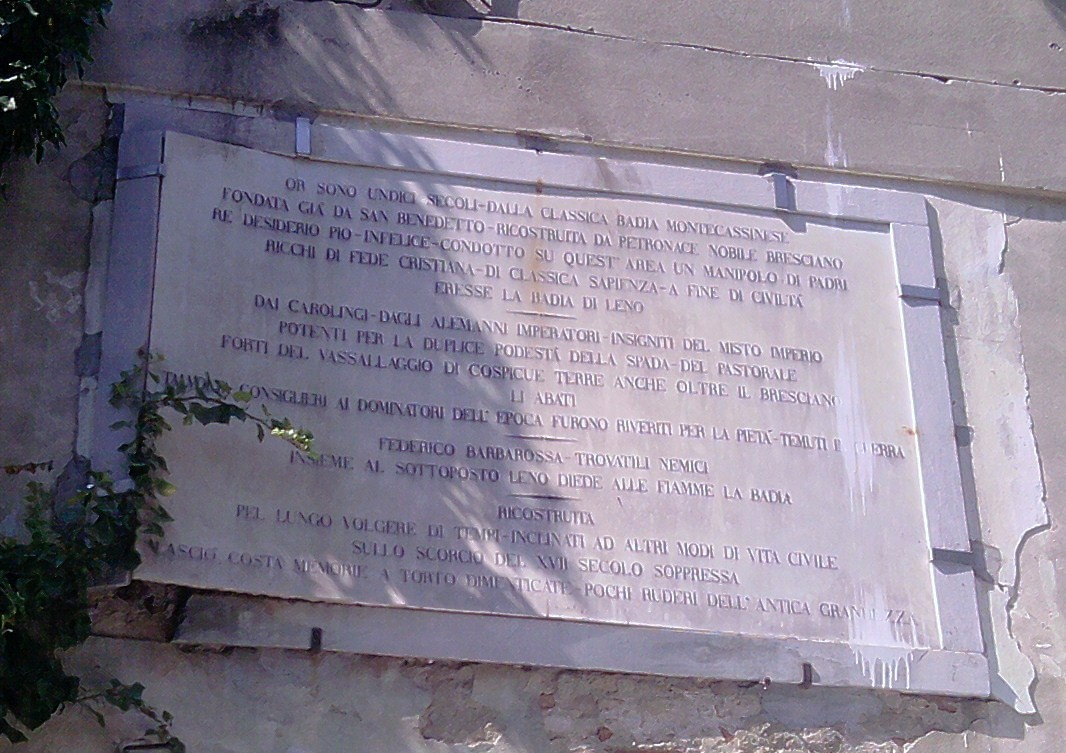
Inscription in memory of the Abbey of Leno

Gottolengo was then a curtis belonging to the abbey, and the form of economy practiced there was precisely the manorial economy, based mainly on agricultural activities and livestock breeding; almost all the peasants worked in the employ of the monks, and few were those who owned plots of land. On the other hand, it was precisely the vastness and continuity of the estates that enabled the Benedictines to implement the great hydraulic and agrarian reclamation works that characterized their activities at the turn of the millennium.

When in the first half of the 10th century an invading people, the Hungarians, began to threaten villages and monasteries, lands and crops of the prosperous Brescian plain with raids and plundering, the monks of Leno decided to fortify the small village of Gottolengo by building palisades and terrepleins around it. Subsequently, the Benedictines faced a new and different danger, the one posed by the increasingly powerful Canossa family and the claims it was making on a part of the Leno Abbey's possessions. The abbots, by exercising patience, diplomacy and authoritative support, were able to resolve the various disputes in their favor.

=== Late ===
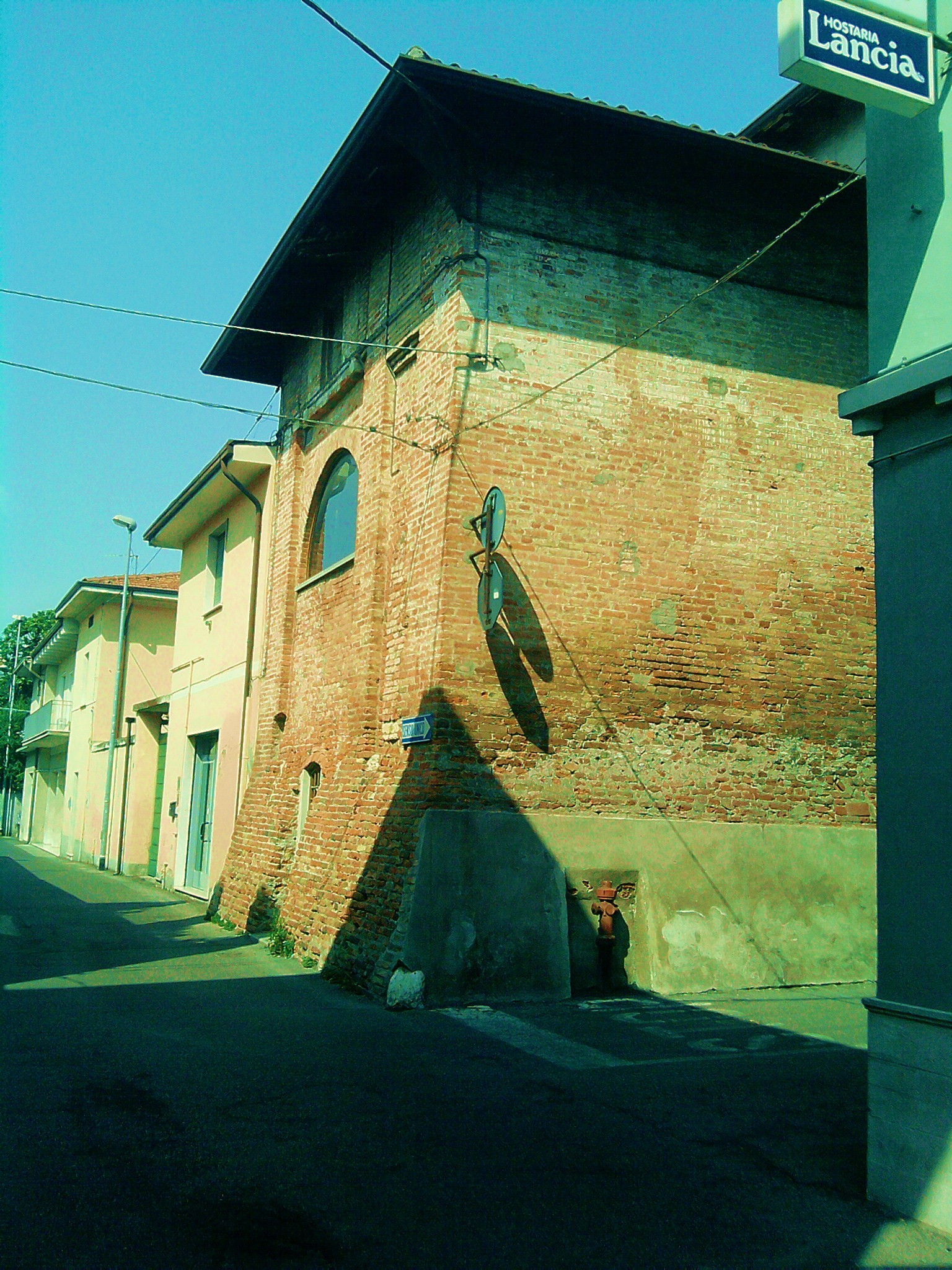
The so-called "tower house," one of the few surviving traces of Gottolengo's defensive system in medieval times.

In 1078, in an acute phase of the struggle over investitures, Artuicus (or Arduicus), a man close to the Church of Rome, became abbot, whose loyalty was rewarded by Pope Gregory VII with an important bull that, in addition to minor prerogatives and territorial expansions for the monastery gave its abbot the power to establish markets, build castles, make direct contact with any bishop in Italy (he previously had to use the Brescian diocese as an intermediary) and consecrate churches. Loyalty to the pontiff did not prevent the rector of the monastery from maintaining good relations with the Germanic emperors as well, thus ensuring a period of peace within the territory and the maintenance of property to the abbey. Thereafter, the election of abbots was guided in various ways by the Germanic emperors.

Things changed radically with the accession to the throne of the new German emperor Frederick I Barbarossa and his authoritarian policies. In 1158, he descended on Italy for the second time, destroyed and sacked the Leno Abbey, forcing the abbot to take refuge in Venice and abandon the monastery at the mercy of the imperial troops, then he conquered Brescia, a Guelph city, and put his advisers in charge of it as he had already done with other municipalities in the region. The reaction of the Lombard cities, united and reorganized into the Lombard League, led twenty years later to the defeat of Frederick I at the Battle of Legnano (May 29, 1176). Barbarossa was forced to enter into a treaty of non-belligerency with his opponents in Venice and to restructure the abbey of Leno, which was granted further diplomas and bulls that reconfirmed the possessions it held, including the village of Gottolengo, which had suffered greatly from the invasions and looting of the imperial soldiers.

Reinstated in full power, the abbot was able to choose his own vassals to whom he would assign the various estates owned by the monastery and from whom he would collect tithes and taxes. This sometimes led to the inevitable emergence of disputes and conflicts, not only of a legal nature, both between monks and feudal lords and between the monastery and the peasants. Of particular importance in this regard was the popular uprising that broke out in 1205, during which Abbot Onesto had to reconquer the Abbey by resorting to arms.

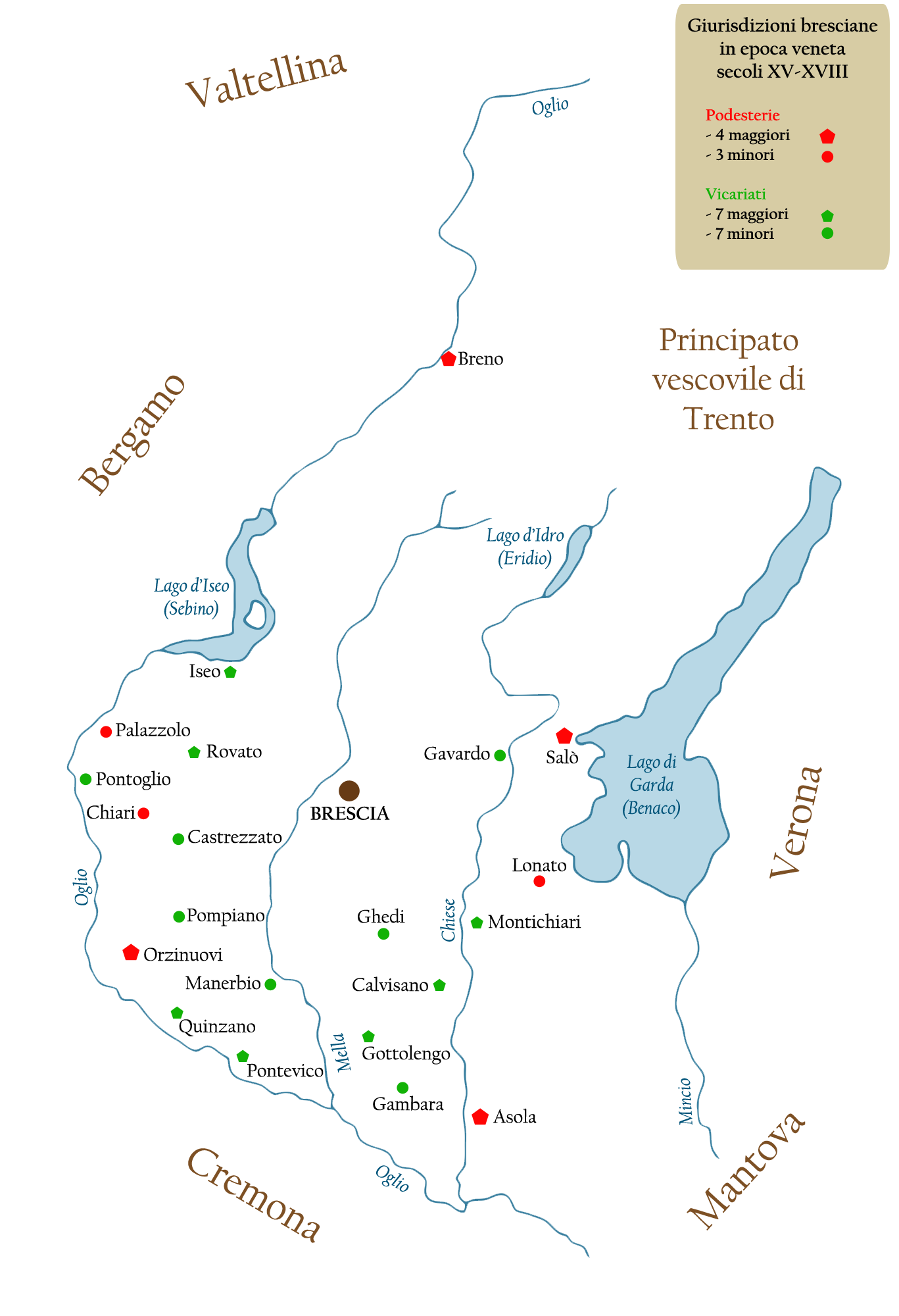
The map shows the organization of the Brescian territory during Venetian rule.

The most deleterious consequences for the Benedictines came from the legal clash, which had already arisen during the communal age, with the increasingly powerful bishop of Brescia, who demanded to subject to his jurisdiction the lands belonging to the monastic community. Eventually the Lenese monks, worn out by continuous struggles and seriously in debt due to the spoliations they had suffered, were forced to surrender many of their properties to the diocese of Brescia. The ancient abbey entered a phase of slow but steady decline that, in the following centuries, would lead it to misery, abandonment and finally demolition (1783).

In the meantime Gottolengo had become a free rural municipality of modest size, at first under the hegemony of the abbots, then under the control of the bishop and the Brescia municipality. In the 13th century it was the scene of a bloody struggle between Guelphs and Ghibellines and endured much plundering; the war between the factions escalated in the following century, when the small lowland village was also put to the test by plagues, famines and even an invasion of caterpillars and locusts. It was also affected by the political events of the municipality of Brescia, first transformed into a signoria and later annexed by the Visconti into their state. During the 15th century, the municipality of Gottolengo was long disputed between the Duchy of Milan and the Republic of Venice. In 1427, in fact, the Brescian territory was occupied by the Venetians who, led by Carmagnola, drove out the Visconti, settling until 1438, when Niccolò Piccinino's Milanese took over the village, but the Visconti interlude was brief and two years later the Venetians returned to Gottolengo. Later the borough was taken back by the Duchy, but with the Peace of Lodi (1454) both the Bergamasque and Brescian areas were recognized as belonging to the Maritime Republic.

During the War of Ferrara, the town of Gottolengo was also involved in the conflict: it was in fact conquered by the Gonzaga, the enemies of the Venetians in 1483, and later retaken by the latter; the hostilities ended with the re-confirmation of the supremacy of the Serenissima in the Brescian territory.

== Modernity ==
Under Venetian rule Gottolengo experienced a remarkable demographic and economic expansion, thanks in part to the impetus given by new agricultural techniques, and the class of landowners, merchants and entrepreneurs that some modern philosophers and sociologists define as "proto-bourgeois" if not even "pre-capitalist" became increasingly established. (Note: As an example, one can see Le quattro borghesie e le contraddizioni post-borghesi of Carlo Gambescia.) This development was greatly influenced by the choice of Gottolengo as the seat of a "major" vicariate, which also included the present municipalities of Cigole, Gambara (minor vicariate), Pavone del Mella and Pralboino, with the associated administrative and economic privileges. Precisely because of the munificence of a wealthy local merchant, the Carmelites were able to erect there in 1479, just outside the walled village, the convent of San Girolamo, allocating it to hospital and welfare activities. It was, among other things, these friars who, a few decades later, introduced new farming methods and new crops such as the potato to the area. In the late 15th century, a community of Jewish refugees was welcomed to Gottolengo, who founded the first local lending banks there.

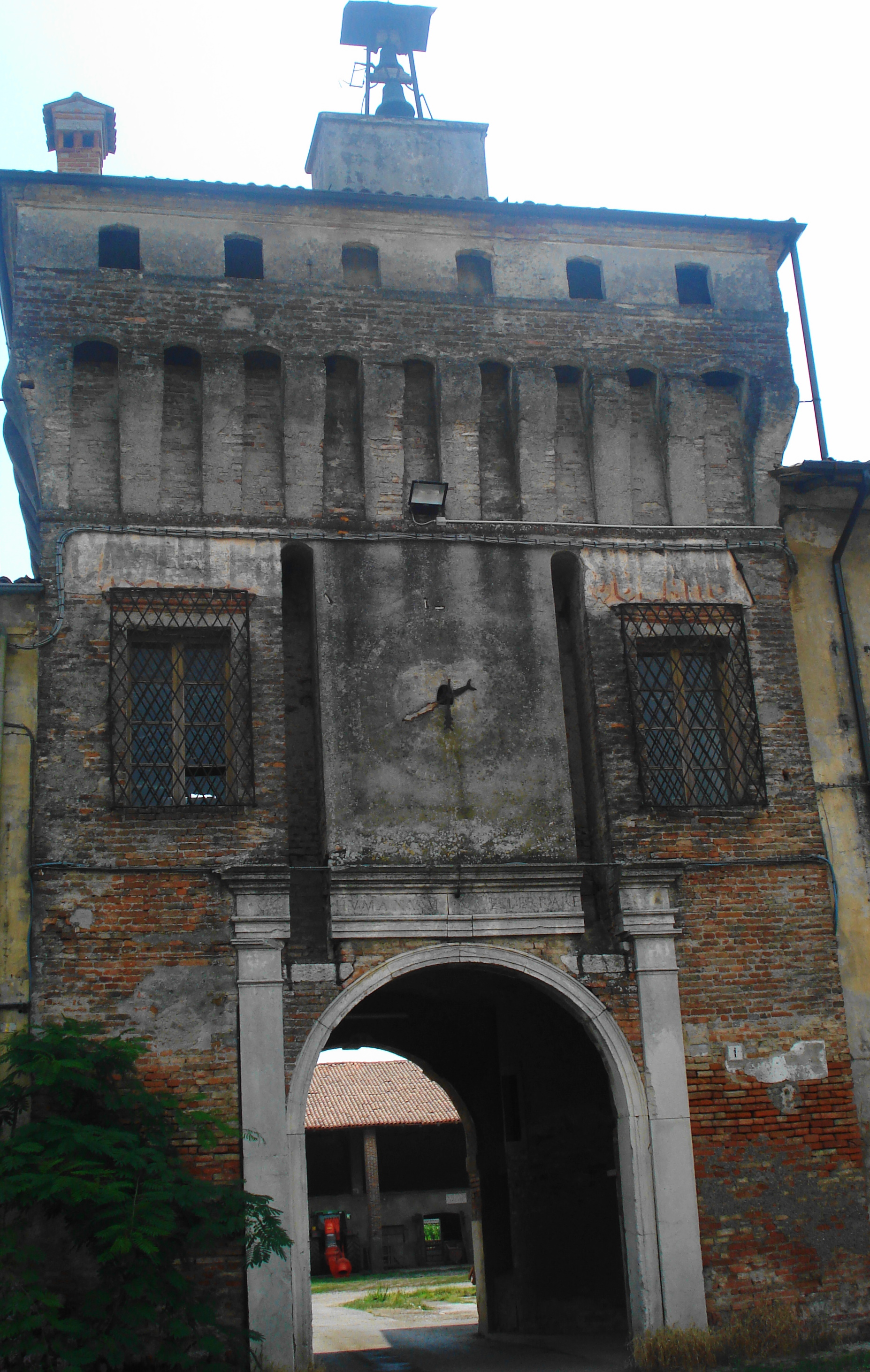
The massive entrance to the Rodengo farmstead-fortress in Solaro

After the disastrous Venetian defeat at Agnadello (1509), the French occupied the Brescian territory and Brescia itself for a few years; the Gambaras, noble and powerful feudal lords of the area loyal to Venice, tried to exploit the situation to create their own state organization by seizing Gottolengo, Manerbio and Quinzano, but the situation normalized with the return of the Venetians (1512). In 1517, another local noble family, the Rodengo, erected a mighty fortified farmhouse in the present hamlet of Solaro, thus attracting other settlements around it and greatly increasing the agricultural development of the locality, which has only recently been depopulated and of which the ancient structure in the form of a cascina a corte remains.

Gottolengo's decadent medieval defenses did not save the town from the violence and looting perpetrated by the Landsknechts in the pay of Emperor Charles V, who passed through on October 29, 1521. For this, the town was awarded the three fleurs-de-lis that still appear on its coat of arms today, conferred on it by King Francis I for having helped the allied Republic of Venice in its resistance against Charles V of Habsburg. To raise the population from the state of misery and neglect resulting from the horrific devastation of the imperial mercenaries and from which it was struggling to recover, tax payments were suspended for five years and the possibility of establishing a weekly market was granted (which still happens every Saturday).

Despite this baleful episode, the 16th century and the following centuries of Venetian rule were nevertheless a period of expansion and progress for the town; although during the 17th century famines, due to bad weather conditions, and epidemics occurred several times. According to the calculations made by the Venetian rector and captain Giovanni da Lezze at the 1610 census, the resident population of Gottolengo turned out to be 1650 inhabitants, devoted mainly to agriculture, to which sericulture was soon added, as was the case in many other neighboring towns and which persisted in the area until the second half of the 20th century.

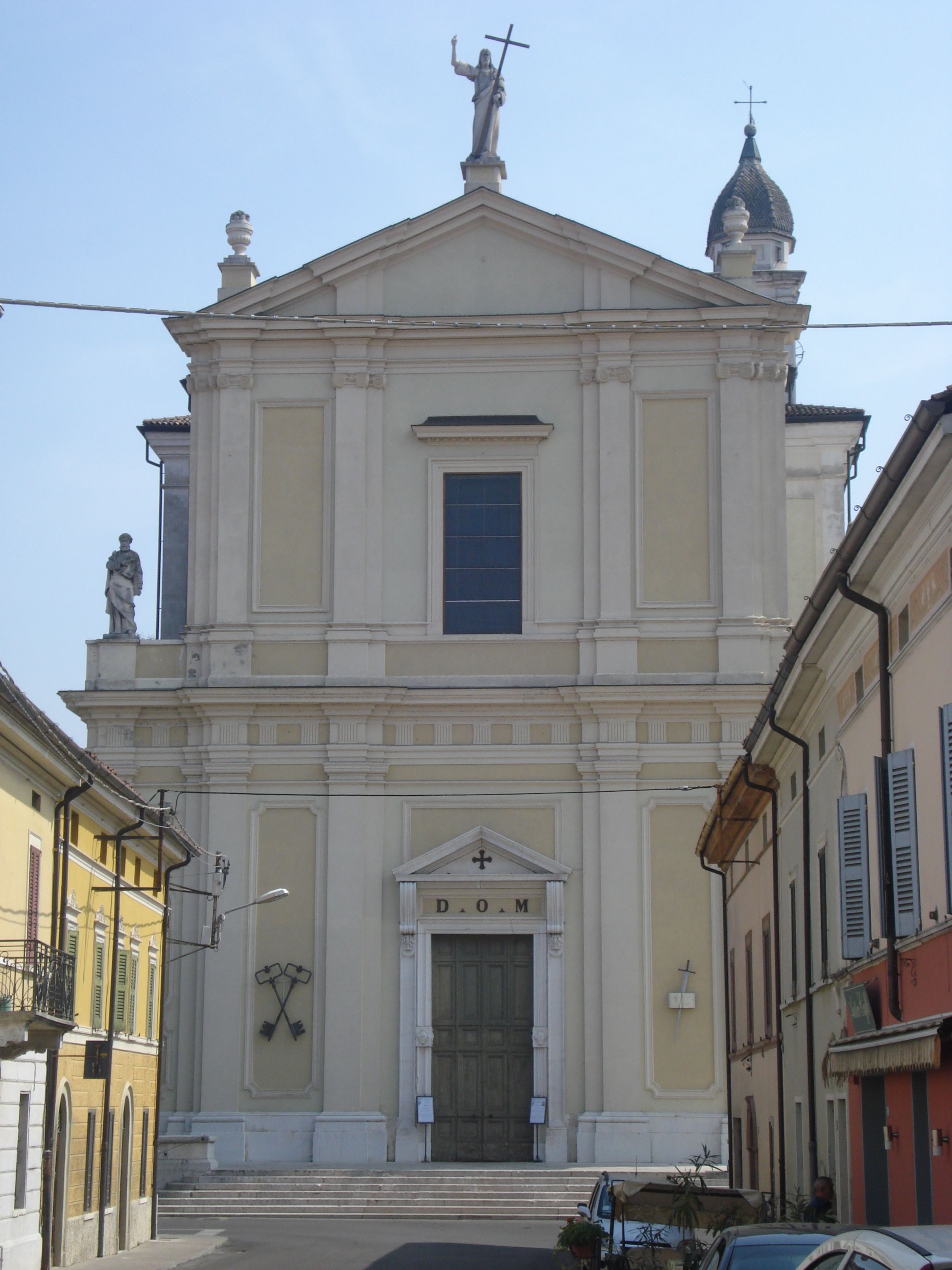
The facade of the parish church of Saints Peter and Paul

Between the 17th and 18th centuries, Gottolengo was also enriched by some valuable buildings such as the Baroque sanctuary of the Madonna dell'Incidella (a name possibly derived from a 16th-century shrine dedicated to Santa Maria in scutella), erected in the second half of the 17th century along the road leading from the village to the locality of Solaro. The present parish church dedicated to Saints Peter and Paul, on the other hand, was erected between 1746 and 1765 in the late Baroque style on the ruins of an earlier one, of which there are records as early as 958 thanks to a diploma of Berengar II that lists it among the possessions of the Benedictine monastery of Leno. The church of St. Anthony the Great was also rebuilt and enlarged in the hamlet of Solaro, on the ruins of the previous one built in the 16th century by the Rodengo family along with their farmhouse-fortress.

Around the middle of the 18th century, the English noblewoman Lady Mary Wortley Montagu stayed for a long time in Gottolengo, in a palace she restored and now used as a restaurant. Costei, an ante litteram feminist, traveler and unconventional writer, in addition to raising horses and silkworms, devoted herself passionately to local history, enriching with numerous writings the historiographical sources concerning the village and, in particular, the ancient parish church.

In the late 18th and early 19th centuries Gottolengo experienced first the invasion and then the Napoleonic domination. Included in the Cisalpine Republic with about 2450 inhabitants among citizens and peasants, the town then moved a few timid steps in the direction of a diversified local economy, flanking traditional agricultural activities with the first, rudimentary industrial manufactures in the textile sector. The township thus grew in importance, and an urban redefinition of the built-up area was considered: new quarters were built, the now decaying medieval walls were torn down and the old moats were gradually buried, standing only a tower-house in the center of the village as the only evidence of the demolished ancient defensive system.

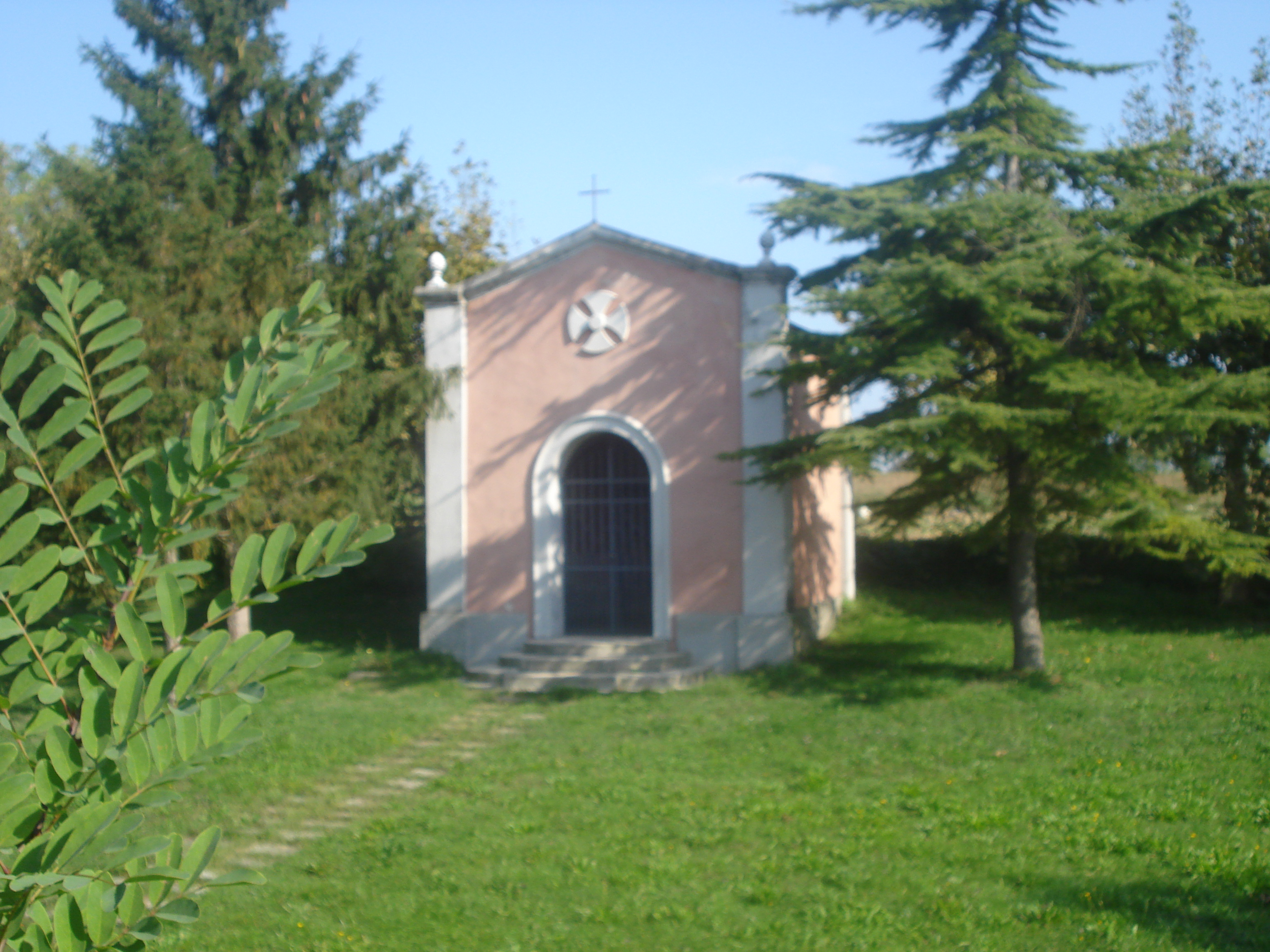
The small chapel of St. Gotthard built on the site of the 1836 lazaret.

Following the decisions of the Congress of Vienna (1815), Gottolengo became part along with all the ancient Venetian mainland of the Lombardo-Venetian Kingdom, under direct Austrian control. Of this period the terrible cholera epidemic of 1836 is particularly remembered, which obliged the local authorities to open a lazaret outside the town, in the area of Castellaro: all the sick were gathered there to prevent the still healthy population from being infected by the disease. Probably, as the map of a cadastre drawn up in the Napoleonic era attests, an area set up to receive the ill had already been established at Castellaro in the 17th century.

With the Second War of Independence (1859), the municipality was annexed to the Piedmontese dominions and thus to the nascent unified Italian state. Toward the end of the century, the evolution of agricultural activity with its ever-increasing capital needs led to the opening of the first modern bank in the village, while in the early twentieth century public lighting was introduced and on October 17, 1914 the Pavone Mella - Gambara tramway was inaugurated, a short branch of the Brescia - Ostiano interurban tramway, which allowed a fixed and faster connection with the provincial capital as well as with neighboring towns (replaced since 1932 by regular buses). Between 1925 and 1928, the municipal territory was involved in some archaeological campaigns, conducted by Professor Piero Barocelli on behalf of the Superintendence of Antiquities, which documented the presence of prehistoric settlements on Castellaro.

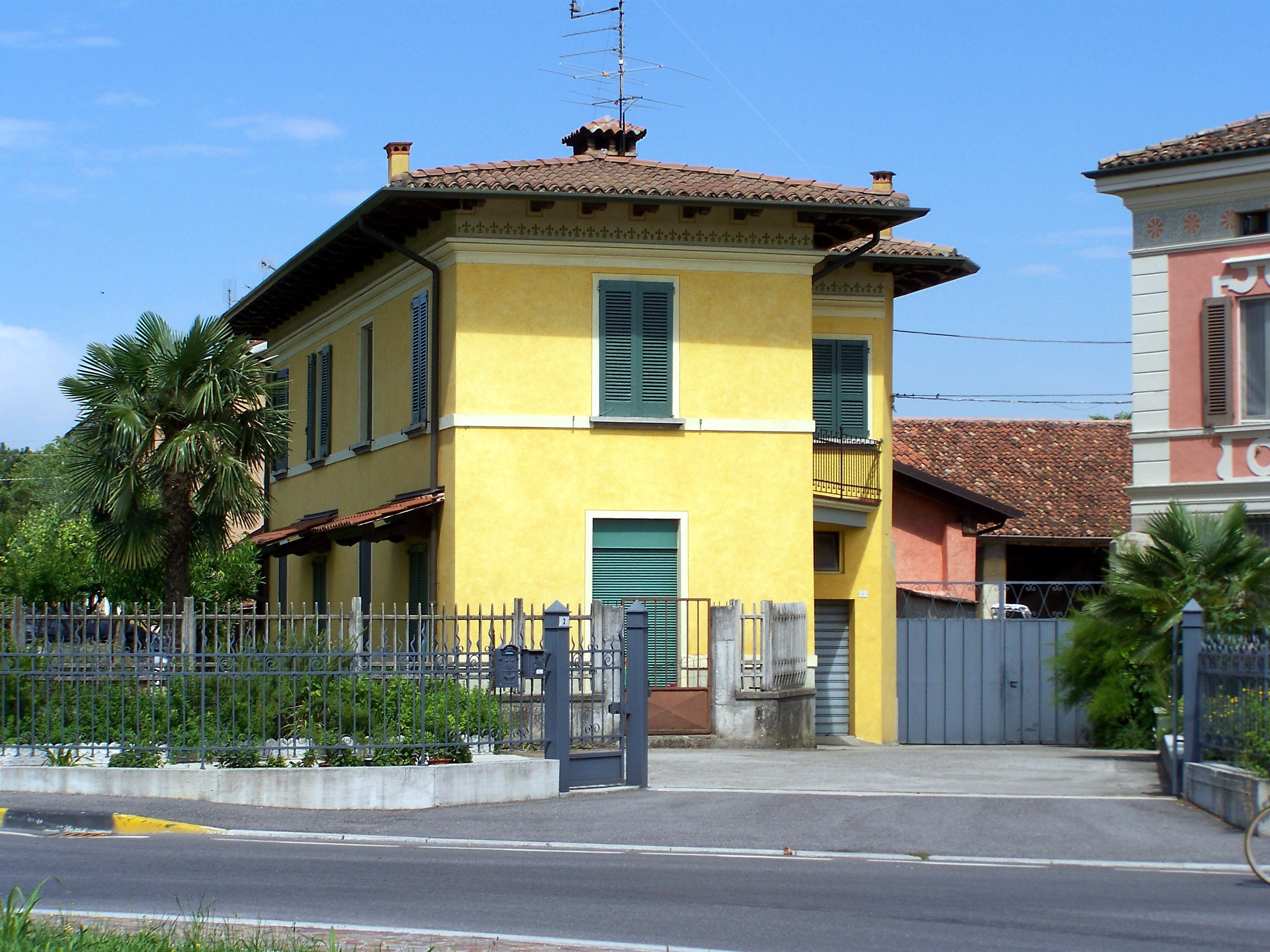
The early 20th century tramway station as it looks today.

During World War II, Gottolengo was put to the test: the black market flourished in the area and thefts multiplied, sunflower planting for food purposes was reintroduced, agricultural equipment was shelved due to lack of fuel, and, in the last phase of hostilities, the town experienced nighttime bombings operated by an Allied fighter-bomber popularly called Pippo. By the end of the conflict, in April 1945, the town was in a state of misery and prostration.

In the post-war period, with the industrial revolution of the 1950s and 1960s, the economic structure began to change in the town: the old trades and traditional agricultural and artisan activities were flanked, and often replaced, by modern industrial enterprises active particularly in the textile, food and mechanical sectors. In fact, like many other municipalities in the Lower Brescian area, Gottolengo was identified as a depressed area and was able to benefit from state allocations that favored its industrialization and the rise of new factories.

In recent decades, economic development has produced intense building activity, which necessitated the adoption of a general land-use plan (2000) to safeguard the harmonious growth of the urban fabric and to prevent building abuses. Despite industrialization, the agricultural spirit and the link to a rural world that has long marked its history and customs still remains very much alive in Gottolengo.

== See also ==
- Gottolengo
- Cisalpine Republic
- Kingdom of Lombardy–Venetia

== Bibliography ==
- Albertini, Mario; Cerioli, Claudio (1994). Trasporti nella Provincia di Cremona - 100 anni di storia (2 ed.). Cremona: Turris.
- Barocelli, Piero (1943). "cap. 62 - Bullettino di Paletnologia Italiana". La stazione del Castellaro di Gottolengo (Brescia). pp. 85–96.
- Barocelli, Piero (1971). Il Castellaro di Gottolengo. Brescia: Ateneo.
- Barocelli, Piero (1975). "cap. 7 - Emilia pre-romana". Manufatti litici di tecnica campignana negli insediamenti preistorici di Villa Cappella e del Castellaro di Gottolengo, pianura mantovano bresciana. pp. 13–33.
- Bonaglia, Angelo (1985). Gottolengo dalle origini neolitiche all'età dei Comuni. Brescia: Apollonio.
- Bonaglia, Angelo (2003). Gottolengo: 1250-1500. Storia e documenti. Comune Gottolengo.
- Bonaglia, Angelo; Celsa, Maria Teresa (2007). Gottolengo: il Cinquecento. Storia e documenti. Comune Gottolengo.
- Bonaglia, Angelo; Superfluo, Alberto (2007). Gottolengo: il Seicento. Storia e documenti. Comune Gottolengo.
- Cirimbelli, Luigi (1993). Leno: dodici secoli nel cuore della Bassa. Il territorio, gli eventi, i personaggi. Leno: Cassa rurale ed artigiana padana.
- Fappani, Antonio; Andrico, Gian Mario (1998). Agro bresciano. La Bassa fra Chiese e Mella. Ghedi: Banca di credito cooperativo Agro bresciano.
- Lucini, Pierino (1988). Gottolengo. Dalla preistoria alla romanità. Brescia: Apollonio.
- Mafrici, Claudio (1997). I binari promiscui. Nascita e sviluppo del sistema tramviario extraurbano in provincia di Brescia (1875-1930) in Quaderni di sintesi n. 51. Brescia: Azienda servizi municipalizzati di Brescia.
- Paoletti, Dezio (1987). Bassa Bresciana: un patrimonio ambientale e culturale da conoscere e valorizzare. Cassa rurale e artigiana della Bassa Bresciana.
- Schiapparelli, Luigi (1924). I Diplomi di Ugo e di Lotario, di Berengario II e di Adalberto. Roma: Istituto Storico Italiano.
- Superfluo, Alberto (1978). L'Oratorio della Madonna d'Incidella in Gottolengo. Montichiari: Zanetti.
