= Visano =

Visano Isà (Lombard)
- Comune
- Comune di Visano
- Location within Italy Location within Lombardy
- Coordinates: 45°19′9″N 10°22′24″E
- Country: Italy
- Region: Lombardy
- Province: Brescia (BS)

Area
  - Total: 11.21 km^{2} (4.33 sq mi)
- Elevation: 59 m (194 ft)

Population (2011)
  - Total: 1,967
  - Density: 175.5/km^{2} (454.5/sq mi)
- Demonym: Visanesi
- Time zone: UTC+1 (CET)
  - Summer (DST): UTC+2 (CEST)
- Postal code: 25010
- Dialing code: 030
- ISTAT code: 017203
- Website: Official website

Visano (Brescian: Isà) is a comune in the province of Brescia, in Lombardy, Italy. It encompasses approximately 11 square kilometres and is the home to about 2,000 people. It borders on the communes of Acquafredda, Calvisano, Isorella and Remedello.
