= Mariateresa Vivaldini =

Italian politician (born 1967)

Mariateresa Vivaldini MEP
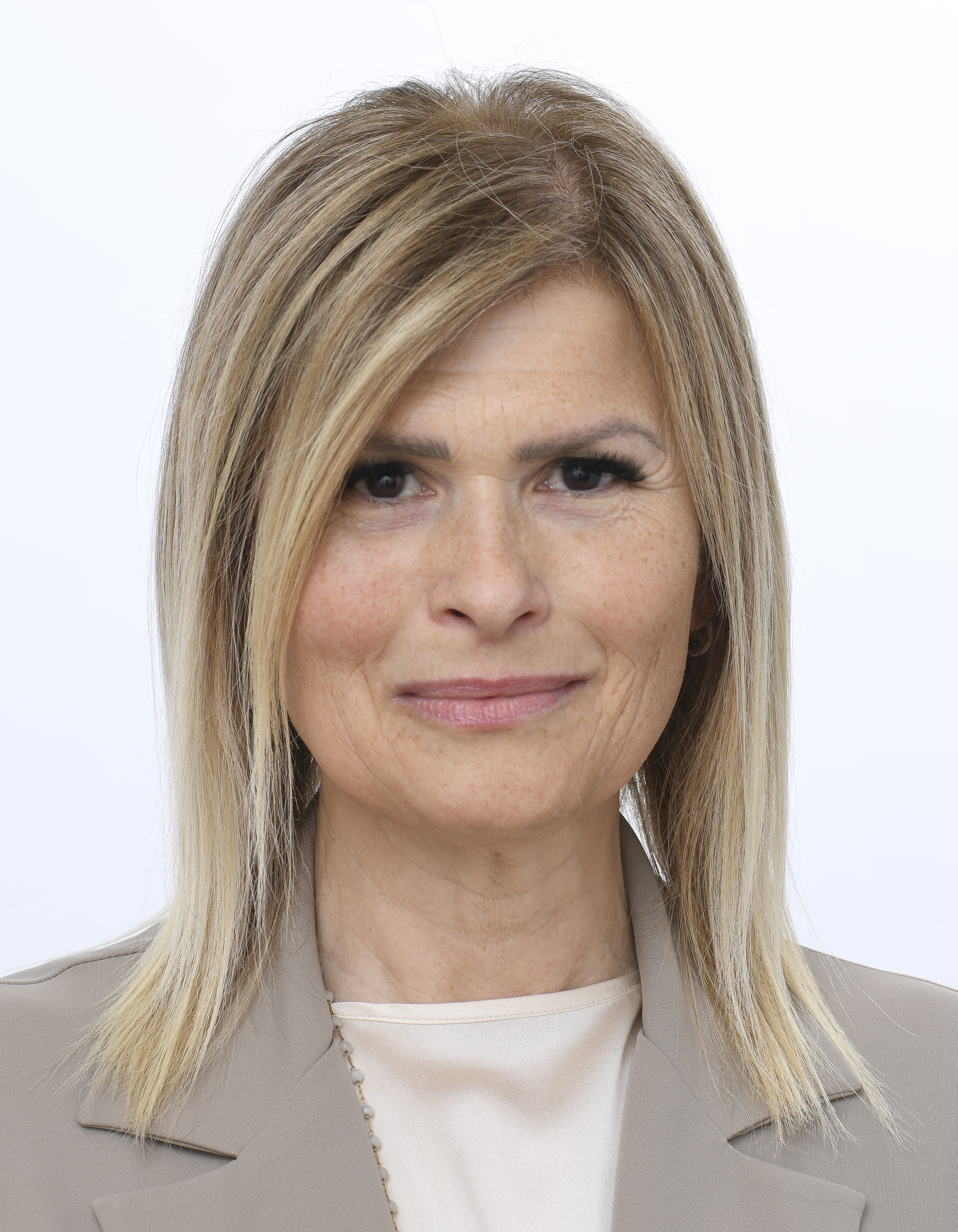
- Official portrait, 2024

Member of the European Parliament for North-West Italy
- Incumbent
- Assumed office 16 July 2024

Mayor of Pavone del Mella
- Incumbent
- Assumed office 26 May 2014
- Preceded by: Piergiorgio Priori

Member of the Pavone del Mella City Council
- Incumbent
- Assumed office 13 June 2004

Personal details
- Born: 22 November 1967 (age 58)
- Party: FdI (2022–present)
- Other political affiliations: FI (until 2009); PdL (2009–2013); NCD (2013–2017); AP (2017); NcI (2017–2022)
- Education: University of Macerata
- Occupation: Entrepreneur • Politician

Mariateresa Vivaldini (born 22 November 1967) is an Italian politician of Brothers of Italy who was elected member of the European Parliament in 2024. She has served as mayor of Pavone del Mella since 2014.

== Biography ==
She comes from a family of agricultural entrepreneurs who have been active in the Brescia and Cremona plains, and she holds a degree in political science and international relations.
