= Isorella =

- Comune
- Comune di Isorella
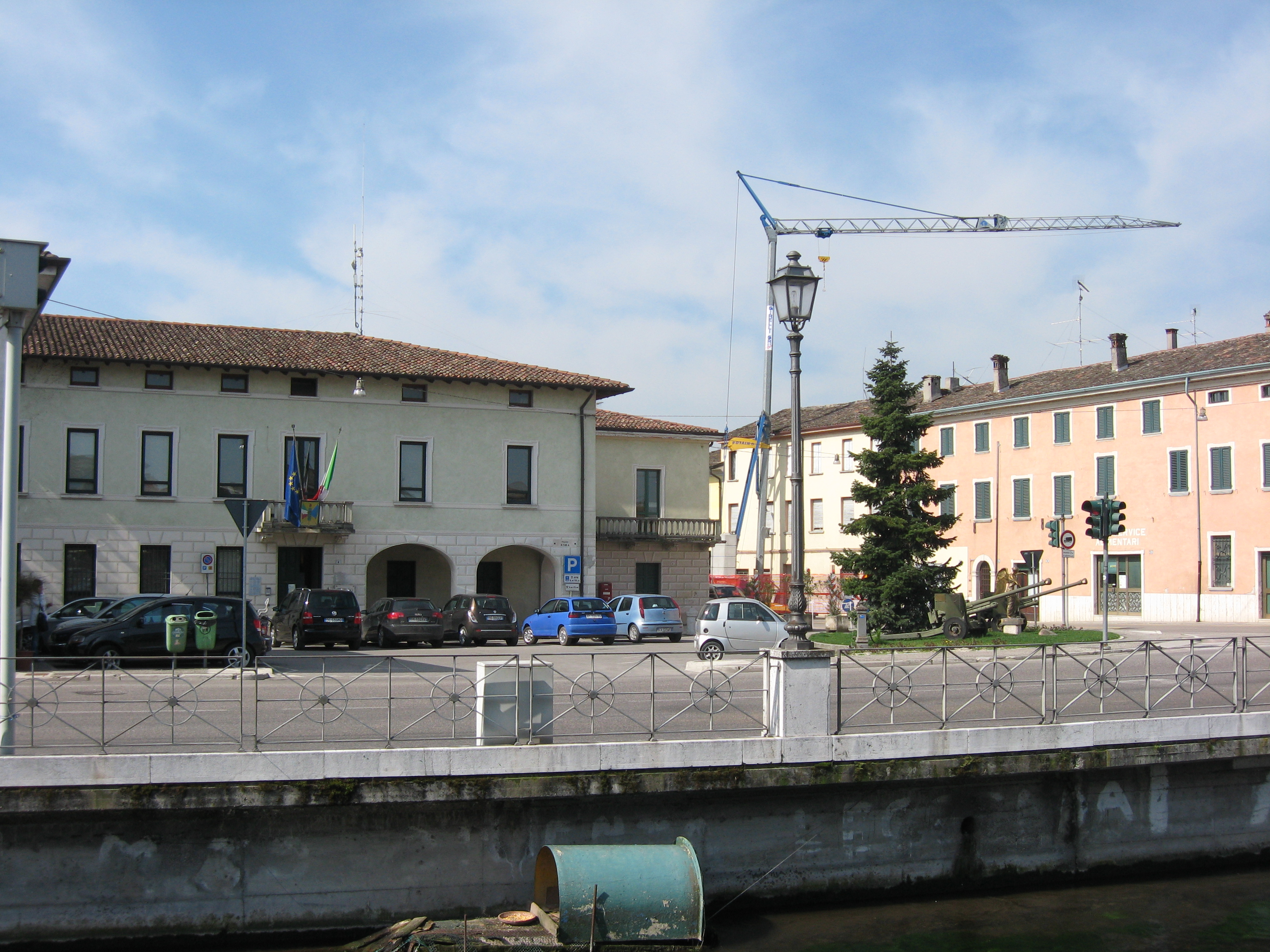
- Isorella, the Town Hall in Roma square

- Location of Isorella in the province of Brescia, Lombardy

- Location of Isorella in Italy Isorella (Lombardy)
- Coordinates: 45°18′N 10°19′E
- Country: Italy
- Region: Lombardy
- Province: Brescia (BS)
- Frazioni: Calvisano, Gambara, Ghedi, Gottolengo, Remedello, Visano

Government
  - Mayor: Chiara Pavesi

Area
  - Total: 15 km^{2} (5.8 sq mi)
- Highest elevation: 60 m (200 ft)
- Lowest elevation: 48 m (157 ft)

Population (2014)
  - Total: 4,116
  - Density: 270/km^{2} (710/sq mi)
- Demonym: Isorellesi
- Time zone: UTC+1 (CET)
  - Summer (DST): UTC+2 (CEST)
- Postal code: 25010
- Dialing code: 030
- ISTAT code: 017086
- Patron saint: San Rocco
- Saint day: 16 August
- Website: Official website

Isorella is a town and comune in the province of Brescia, in Lombardy, Italy.
