= Gambara =

Gambara Gàmbara
- Comune
- Comune di Gambara
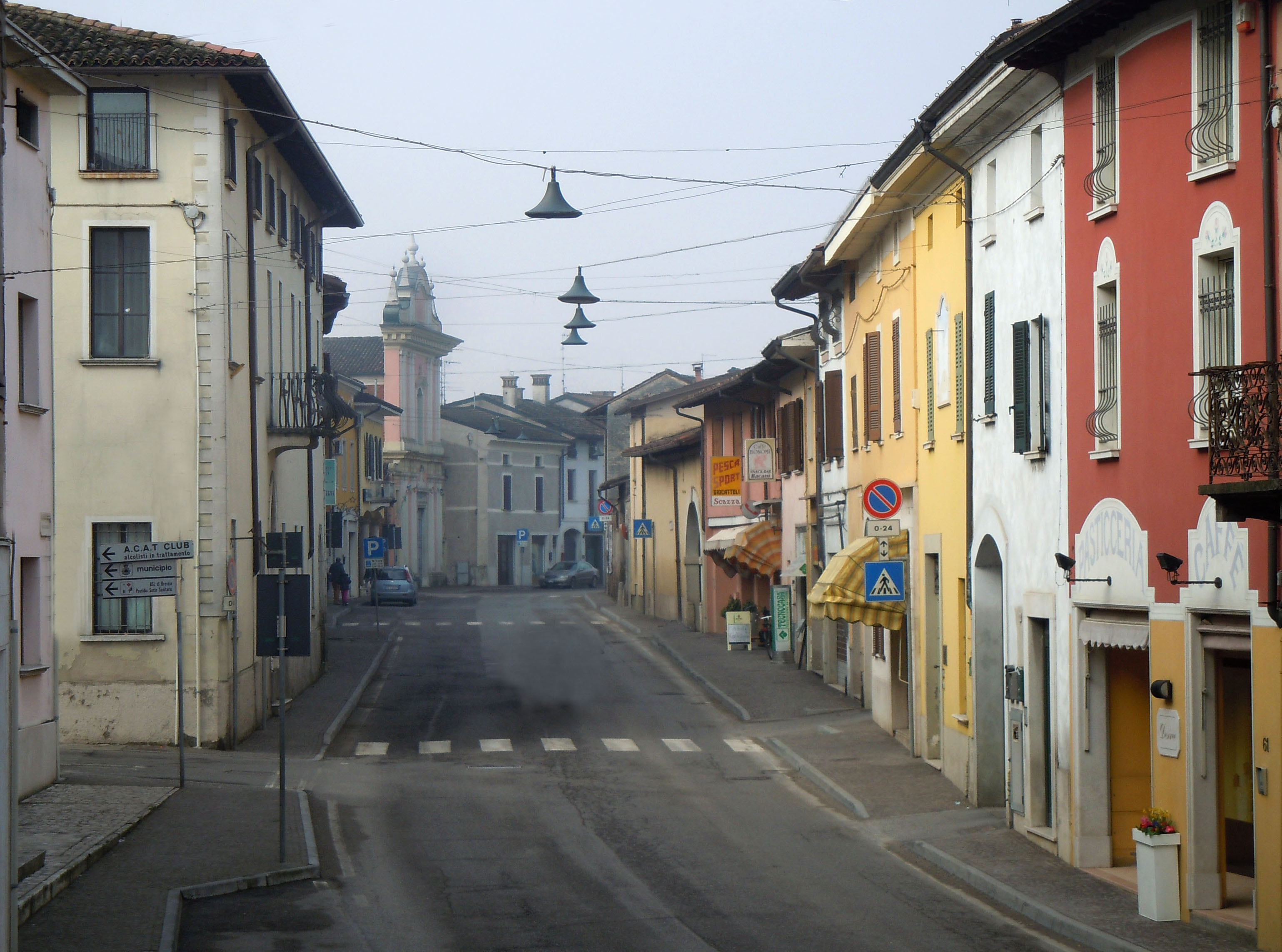
- Gambara (2011)

- Coat of arms

- Location within Italy Location within Lombardy
- Coordinates: 45°15′N 10°18′E
- Country: Italy
- Region: Lombardy
- Province: Brescia (BS)
- Frazioni: Corvione

Area
  - Total: 31 km^{2} (12 sq mi)
- Elevation: 51 m (167 ft)

Population (2021)
  - Total: 4,493
  - Density: 140/km^{2} (380/sq mi)
- Demonym: Gambaresi
- Time zone: UTC+1 (CET)
  - Summer (DST): UTC+2 (CEST)
- Postal code: 25020
- Dialing code: 030
- ISTAT code: 017073
- Patron saint: San Pietro e Paolo
- Saint day: 29 June
- Website: Official website

Gambara (Brescian: Gàmbara), not to be confused with Gambarana, is a town and comune in the province of Brescia, in Lombardy. Bordering communes are Asola (MN), Fiesse, Gottolengo, Isorella, Ostiano (CR), Pralboino, Remedello and Volongo (CR).

== Physical geography ==
Gambara is bordered by the rivers Mella and Chiese, tributaries of the nearby river Oglio. The town is located on the right side of the Gambara river.
