= Gottolengo =

Comune in Lombardy, Italy

Gottolengo Otalènch (Lombard)
- Comune
- Comune di Gottolengo
- Coat of arms

- Location within Italy Location within Lombardy
- Coordinates: 45°17′30″N 10°16′12″E
- Country: Italy
- Region: Lombardy
- Province: Brescia (BS)
- Frazioni: Solaro, Solarino, Baldone, Remaglie, Segalana, Monticelle di sopra, Osteria

Government
  - Mayor: Daniele Dancelli (civic list) from 13-6-2022

Area
  - Total: 29 km^{2} (11 sq mi)
- Elevation: 53 m (174 ft)

Population (30-11-2024)
  - Total: 5,043
  - Density: 170/km^{2} (450/sq mi)
- Demonym: Gottolenghesi
- Time zone: UTC+1 (CET)
  - Summer (DST): UTC+2 (CEST)
- Postal code: 25023
- Dialing code: 030
- ISTAT code: 017080
- Patron saint: San Pietro and Paolo
- Saint day: 29 June
- Website: Official website

Gottolengo (Italian: [ɡottoˈleŋɡo, -ˈlɛŋ-]; Brescian: Otalènch) is a comune (municipality) with a population of 5,043 inhabitants, located in the Province of Brescia in Lombardy, Italy. It lies within the Bassa Bresciana, the southernmost part of the province, which encompasses the greatest number of comuni—sixty-one in total.

Gottolengo holds significant archaeological importance due to the numerous artifacts unearthed since the mid-1920s in the Castellaro area. Today, the comune serves as an industrial hub while retaining many traces of its rural heritage, to which the town remained closely tied until just a few decades ago. The small, now uninhabited frazione (borough) of Solaro is situated north of the main settlement.

== Geography ==
=== Territory ===
The territory of Gottolengo lies within the Po Valley. The comune is positioned near the borders of the Province of Cremona and the Province of Mantua and falls within the Eastern Bassa Bresciana, the flat lowland area in the southeastern part of the province. Consequently, the town is entirely flat, with the only elevation being the Castellaro locality, a hill that marks Gottolengo’s highest point at 65 meters above sea level.

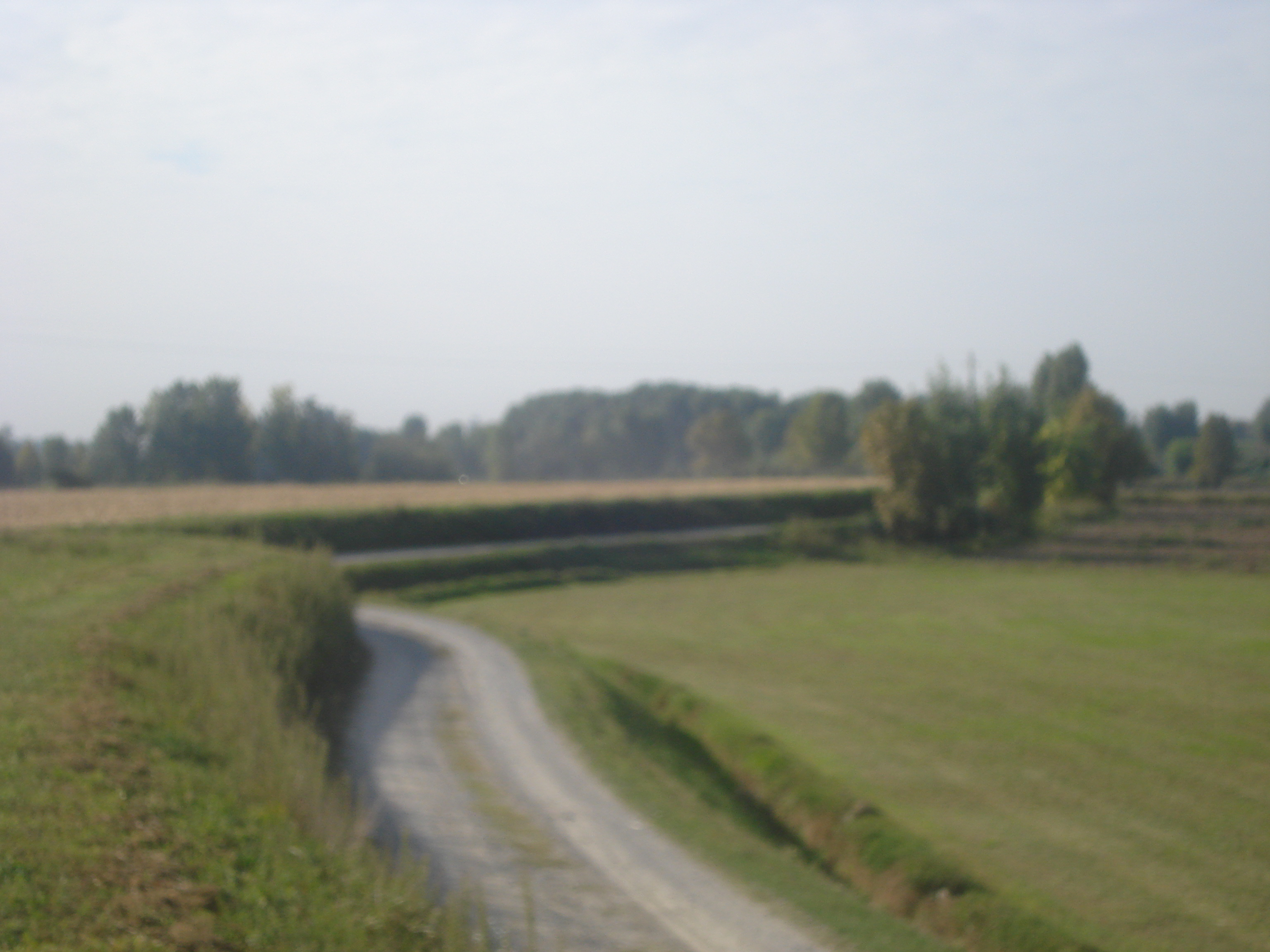
Characteristic view of the Gottolengo countryside

The main river that crosses the town is the Gambara River, named after the neighboring municipality of the same name, which borders Gottolengo to the south.

Numerous artificial canals, vital to the local economy, support the irrigation of cultivated fields.

In terms of seismic risk, Gottolengo is categorized as low risk (Zone 3) following the 2004 Salò earthquake on 24 November 2004.

=== Climate ===
The climate is typical of the Upper Po Valley: summers are hot and humid, winters are cold and often foggy, with occasional snowfalls during the coldest months.

- Climatic classification: Zone E, 2479 DD.

== Etymology ==
The toponym Gottolengo is very probably of Gothic-Lombard origin, as evidenced by the root Gott-, of Gothic origin, and the suffix "-engo," characteristically Lombard. The influence of Germanic dialects, particularly Lombard, is notably widespread in the toponymy of the surrounding area. Gottolengo likely means "territory belonging to the village." This name first appears in the Diploma of Berengar II to the Abbot of Leno in 958.

== History ==
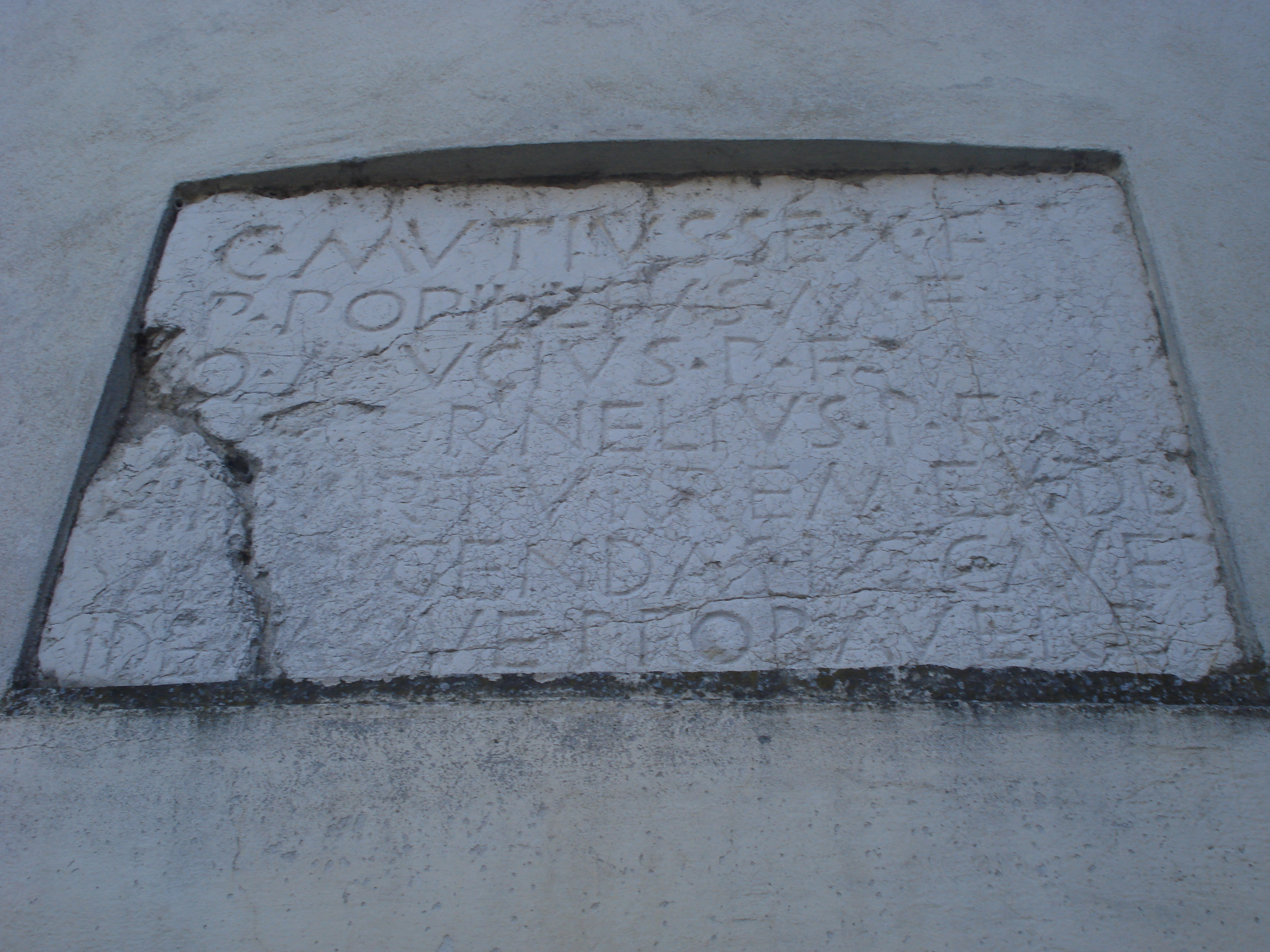
The ancient Roman tombstone in the apse of the church

The area now occupied by the modern municipality of Gottolengo was first inhabited around 2000 BCE, when early settlers established themselves in the Castellaro area, initially constructing simple stilt houses. They chose this location due to its strategic hilltop position above a surrounding stream. However, the site was abandoned by the end of the Bronze Age, and a new village emerged where the current town center now stands. This shift is evidenced by the so-called Tombstone of the Quattuorviri (1st century CE), which commemorates the construction of a defensive tower, authorized by a decree of the decurions—the municipal council based in Brixia (modern-day Brescia), of whose municipium Gottolengo was a part)—under the supervision of the supreme municipal magistrates, the Quattuorviri. The tombstone, embedded in the apse of the parish church, bears the following inscription:

Caius Mutius, son of Sextus
Publius Popillius, son of Marcus
Quintus Mucius, son of Publius
Marcus Cornelius, son of Publius
Quattuorviri, by decurional decree
erected this tower
and the same approved it
C(aius) MVTIVS SEX(ti) F(ilius)
P(ublius) POPILLIVS M(arci) F(ilius)
Q(uintus) MVCIVS P(ubli) F(ilius)
M(arcus) CORNELIVS P(ubli) F(ilius)
IIIIVIR(i) TURREM EX D(ecreto) D(ecurionum)
AD AVGENDAS LOCAVER(e)
IDEMQVE PROBAVERE

By the late 6th century, the Gottolengo territory fell under Lombard control, who later donated it to the nascent Leonense Abbey, a Benedictine monastery in Leno. The abbey was founded in 758 by Desiderius, a Lombard king from Brescia, who, along with his wife Ansa, had also established the Monastery of Santa Giulia in his hometown, where their daughter Anselperga served as the first abbess.

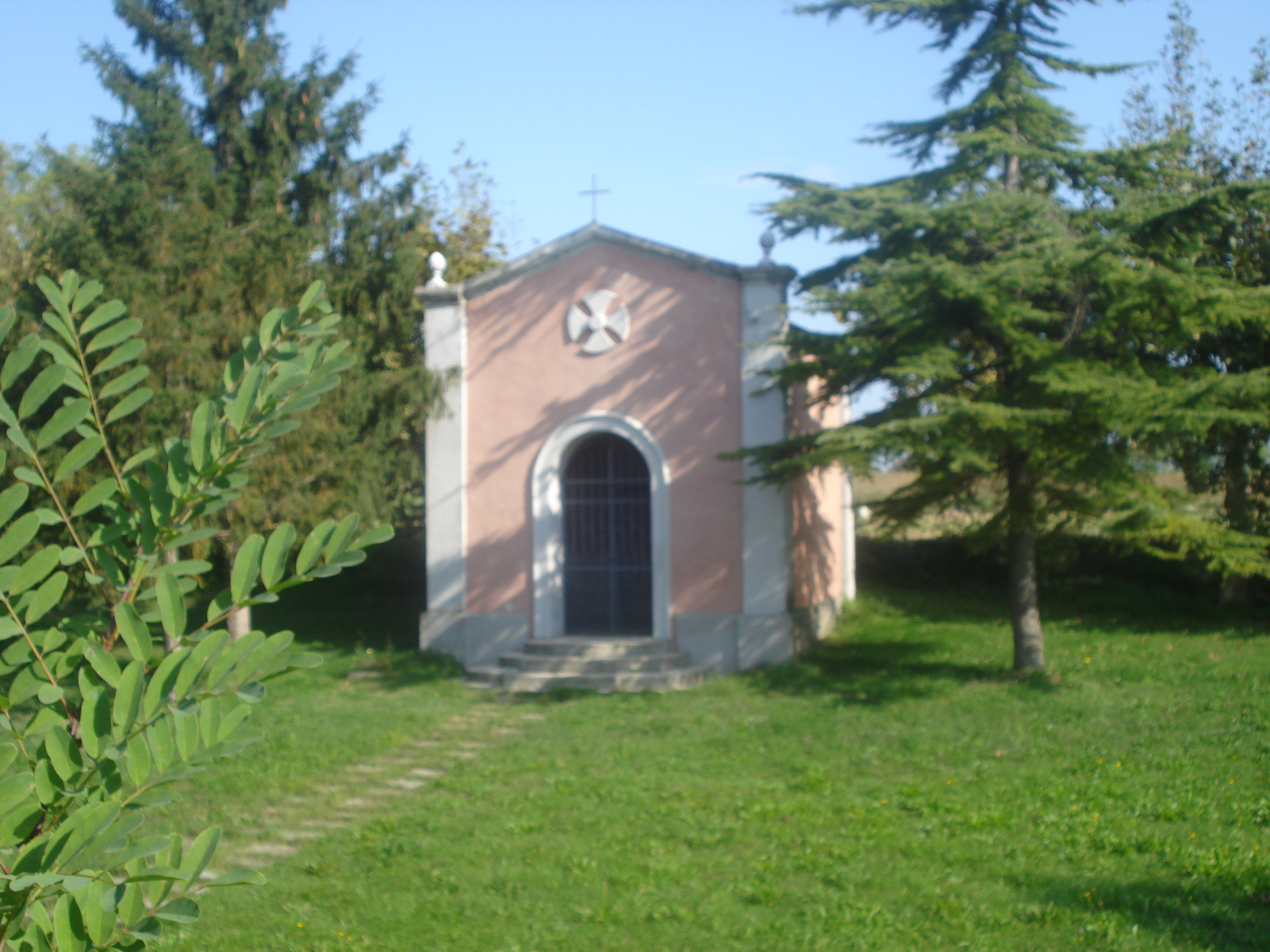
The Aedicule of Saint Gotthard located in the former lazaretto area, along the municipal road to Gambara

During the Late Middle Ages and Renaissance, Gottolengo evolved into a walled village of moderate significance, initially under the political-administrative jurisdiction of the abbey’s monks, then under the Visconti family, and later the Republic of Venice. In October 1521, the town was sacked by Landsknecht mercenaries, plunging it into poverty and neglect. That same year, the French government awarded Gottolengo a distinction; the municipality received three fleurs-de-lis of France, still featured on its coat of arms, for aiding the Republic of Venice, a French ally, in resisting Charles V.

In 1836, Gottolengo was ravaged by a cholera epidemic. As a result, a lazaretto was established outside the town center in the Castellaro area to isolate the sick and prevent the spread of infection among the healthy population within the walls.

Between the late 19th and early 20th centuries, the tertiary sector began to develop, coinciding with the establishment of the first agricultural bank. In 1914, the town was connected by the Pavone del Mella-Gambara branch of the Brescia-Ostiano tramway, which operated until 1932. At the outbreak of World War I, many soldiers from Gottolengo departed for the front, later commemorated as national heroes in the town’s war memorial along the provincial road to Leno. The town was deeply affected by World War II, and upon liberation by the Anglo-American forces, it had fallen into abject poverty. It was only with the post-war industrial revolution that Gottolengo’s economic landscape began to transform. Alongside traditional agricultural and artisanal trades, various industrial enterprises emerged, yet the town retains a vibrant rural spirit that continues to hold significant economic and social importance.

=== Symbols ===

The coat of arms and banner were granted by a Presidential Decree (D.P.R.) on 20 March 2006.

Or, a fess gules charged with three fleurs-de-lis or, bordered in fess by two fillets, one above and one below, azure. External ornaments of a municipality.

— D.P.R. 20.03.2006

The banner is a drape of azure.

The Gottolengo coat of arms is a simple golden escutcheon, featuring a fess with the three fleurs-de-lis of France, awarded to the municipality for supporting the Venetians against Charles V of Habsburg.

The passage of Spanish-Papal troops proved devastating for Gottolengo: on 29 October 1521, soldiers stormed the village, looting and plundering everything in their path. Consequently, Gottolengo was exempted from taxes for approximately five years and granted permission to establish its own market.

Until relatively recently, Gottolengo bore a more ornate and elaborate coat of arms, assigned during the Napoleonic era. This emblem was later suppressed by the Fascist regime before being reinstated in the post-war years. It featured various drums, a horse’s head, weapons, and flags, lacking the municipal crown now present above the shield. Recently, the design was simplified and updated, though it retains the fleurs-de-lis as a nod to the historical event.

== Monuments and places of interest ==
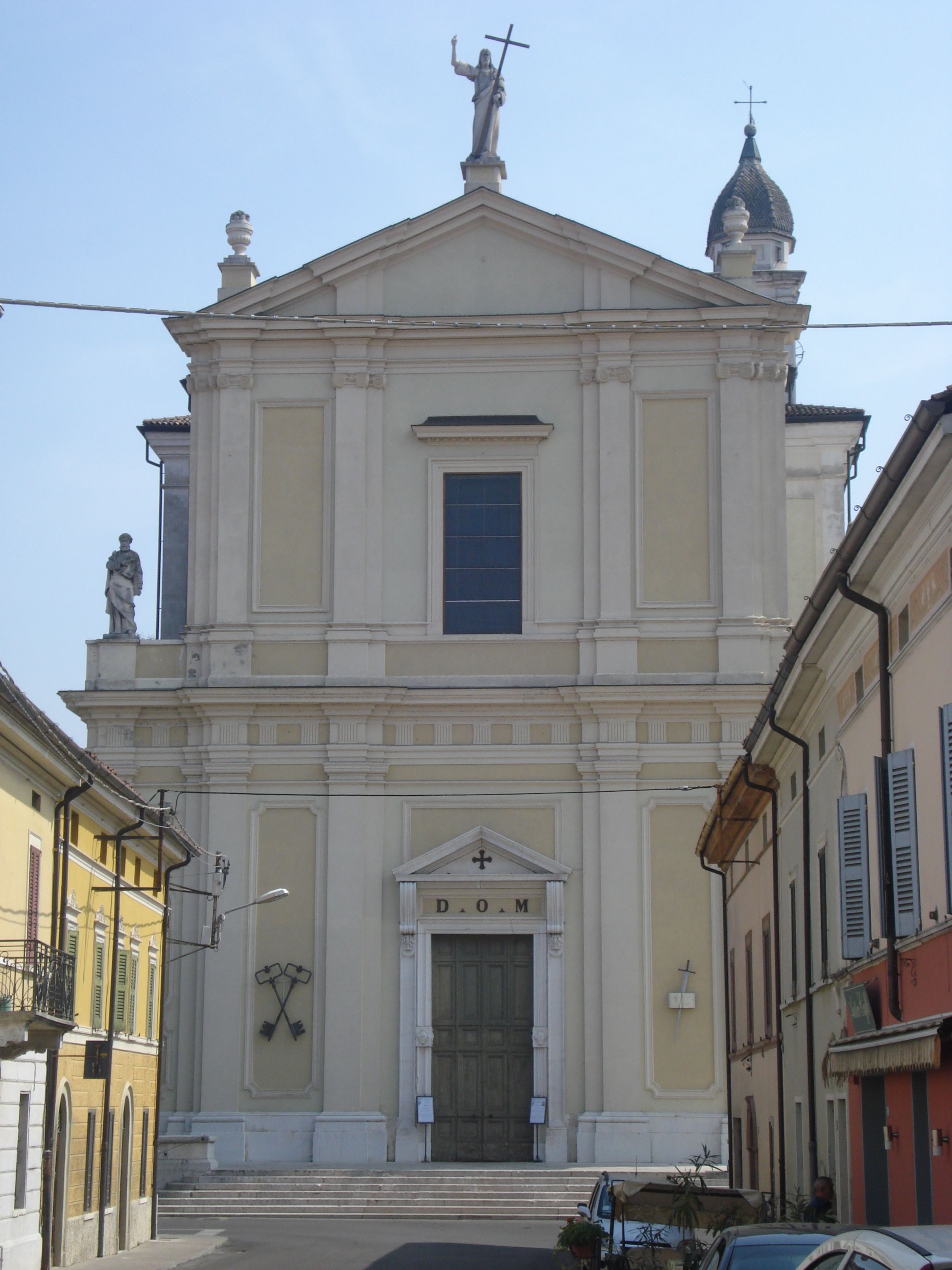
The facade of the Parish Church of Saints Peter and Paul

=== Religious architecture ===
==== Church of Saints Peter and Paul ====
The current Gottolengo parish church, dedicated to Saints Peter and Paul, was constructed starting in 1746, designed by architect Domenico Prandini from Calvisano, to rival the church in nearby Gambara. Completed in 1765 and consecrated in 1778, as noted by two plaques above the choir’s side portals,
this Baroque-style church boasts numerous frescoes, including the Martyrdom of Saint Peter atop the apse, beneath which lies the high altar. Another notable work is the Virgin with Saint Peter, attributed to Giambettino Cignaroli, positioned above the choir. Beyond its seven marble altars—featuring lateral niches adorned with statues or frescoes—the church houses wooden sculptures of the dying Christ on the cross and the Madonna, as well as a recently restored Serassi organ from the mid-19th century.
The facade is divided into two orders: the first cornice hosts statues of Saint Peter and Saint Paul, while the summit features a sculpture of Christ’s Resurrection. The parish church hosts the town’s main religious services.

==== Convent of Saint Jerome ====
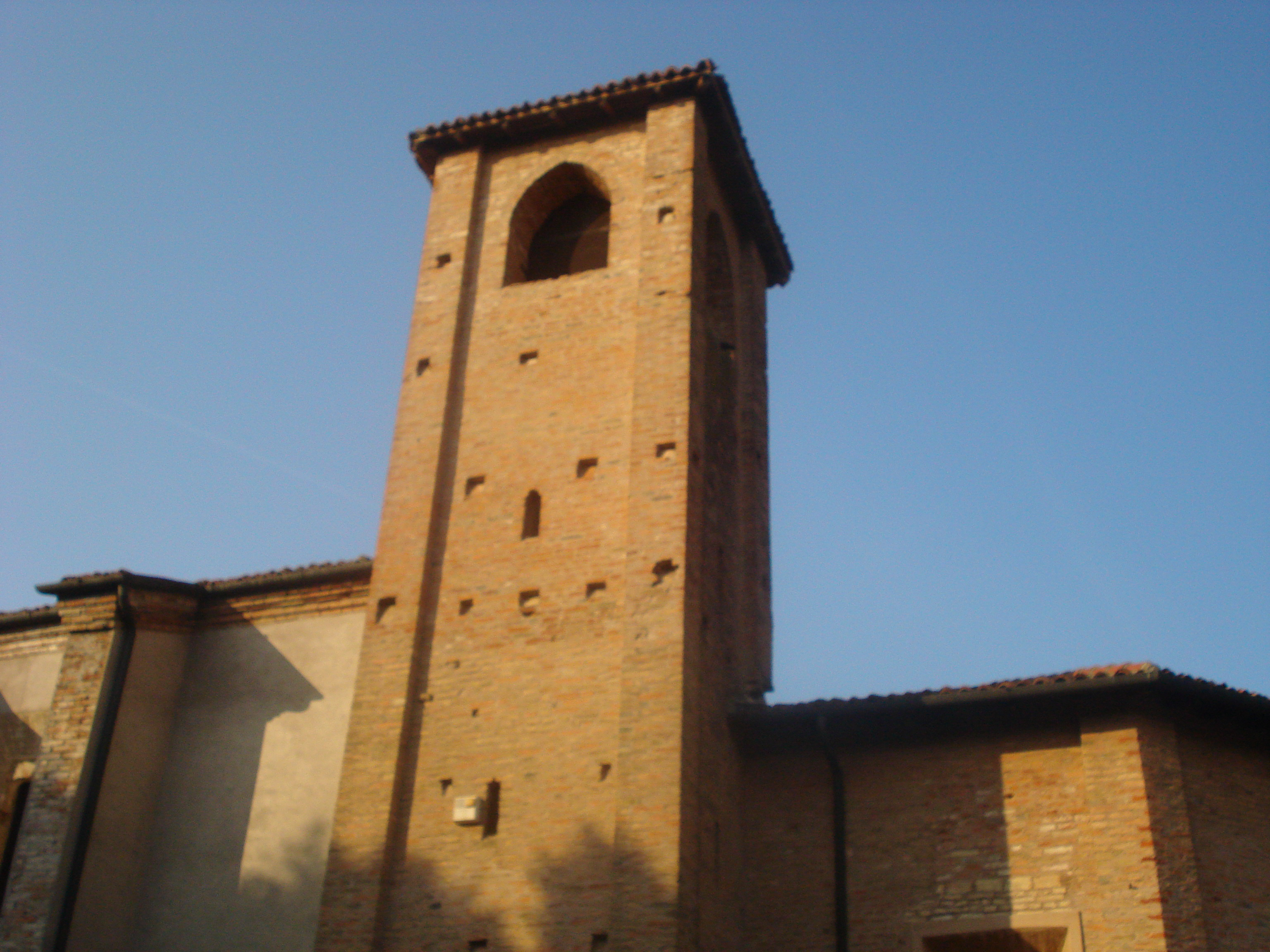
The brick bell tower of the Church of Saint Jerome

The Convent of the Carmelites, dedicated to Saint Jerome, was established in 1479 outside the walled village. Construction began after a wealthy Gottolengo goldsmith bequeathed his estate to the municipality for charitable works. The municipality allocated the funds to a Carmelite friar and supplied bricks for the monastery’s erection. The complex included the convent and an adjoining church; the resident Carmelites devoted themselves to charitable acts for the poor, providing hospital and welfare services. In the 16th century, they introduced potato cultivation to the area. The Carmelite monastery was dissolved in 1797 and repurposed as a hospital, with housing later constructed within.

The church persisted as a hospital chapel post-dissolution, becoming a dependency of Gottolengo’s parish; recently restored, it now serves as a place of worship only on specific occasions. The church comprises a single nave flanked by eight niches adorned with numerous frescoes of saints, including standout depictions of Saint Lucy, Saint Apollonia, and Saint Anthony the Great. A 16th-century wooden statue of the Virgin in Prayer enthroned with child, housed within, inspires deep devotion among locals. The church is owned by the Fondazione Casa di Riposo Cami-Alberini.

==== Sanctuary of the Incidella ====
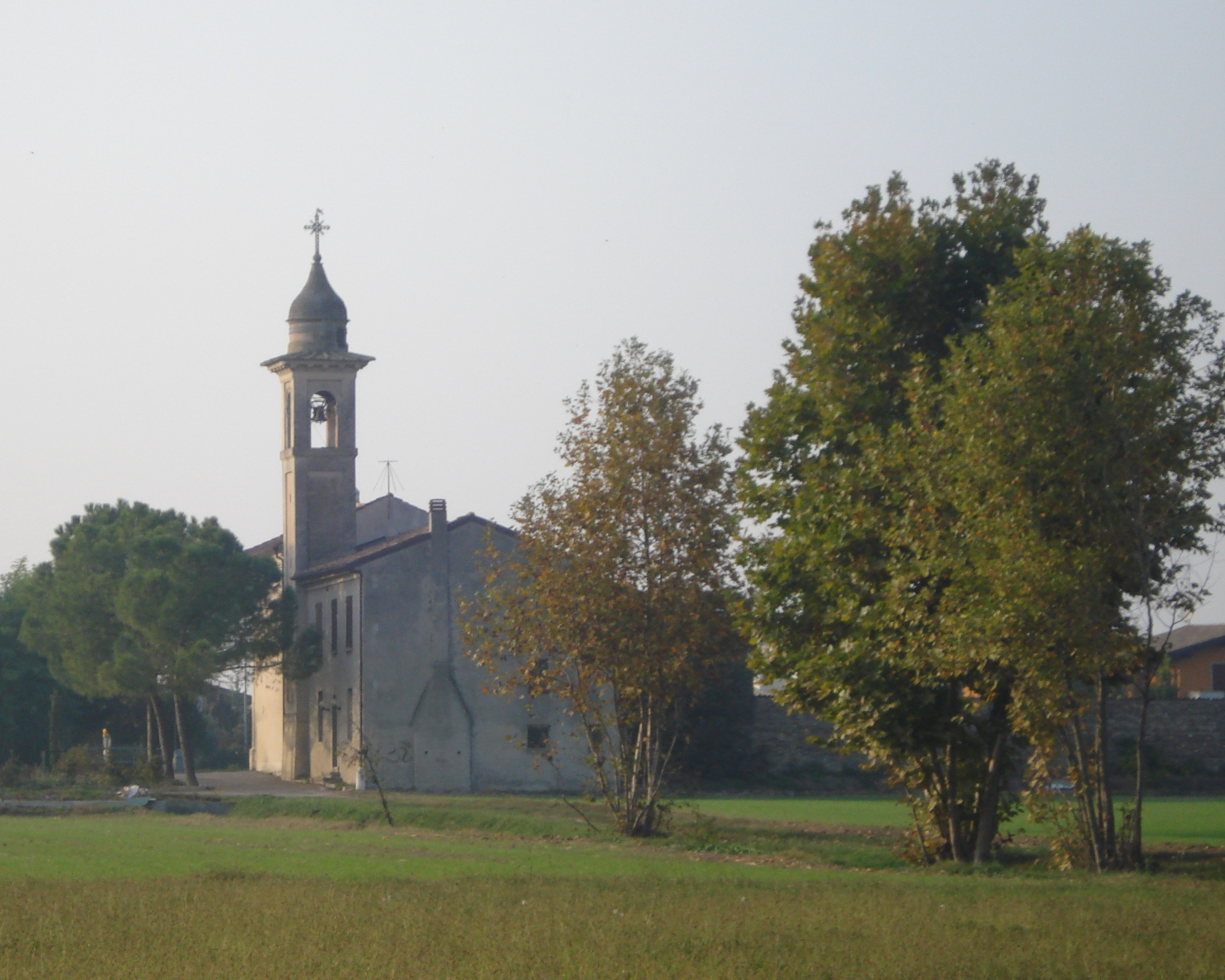
Rear view of the Incidella Sanctuary

The Sanctuary of the Incidella, located along the road from the municipality to the frazione of Solaro and Isorella, is a devotional site dedicated to the Nativity of the Blessed Virgin Mary and designated a sanctuary due to a miracle reported there in 1653. The structure, comprising an oratory and a church with a bell tower, dates to the 17th century and was built in Baroque style atop an earlier chapel.
Its entrance once featured a three-arched portico before the church facade, removed after a truck damaged it in a 1960 accident and never rebuilt. The facade now includes a marble-finished portal and a rose window with stained glass.

=== Civil and military architecture ===
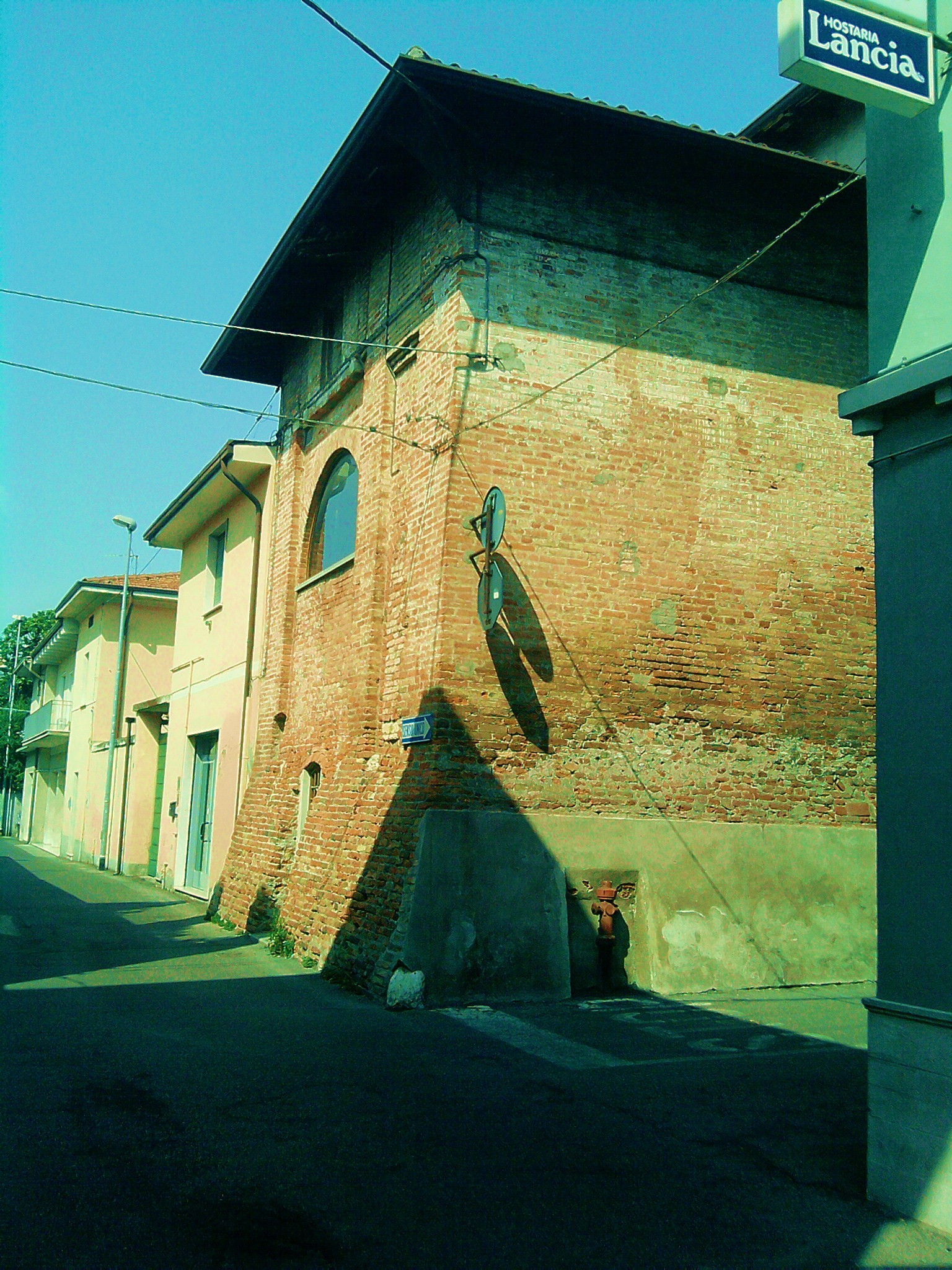
The tower house

Facing the town’s main square stands the municipal theater, dedicated to Brescian politician Giuseppe Zanardelli, designed in Art Nouveau style and recently renovated. Adjacent to the square is the Casa Torre, remnants of a fort that once served as the primary entrance to the ancient village. This tower was part of a now-vanished defensive wall system, encircled by a stream and accessed via a drawbridge.

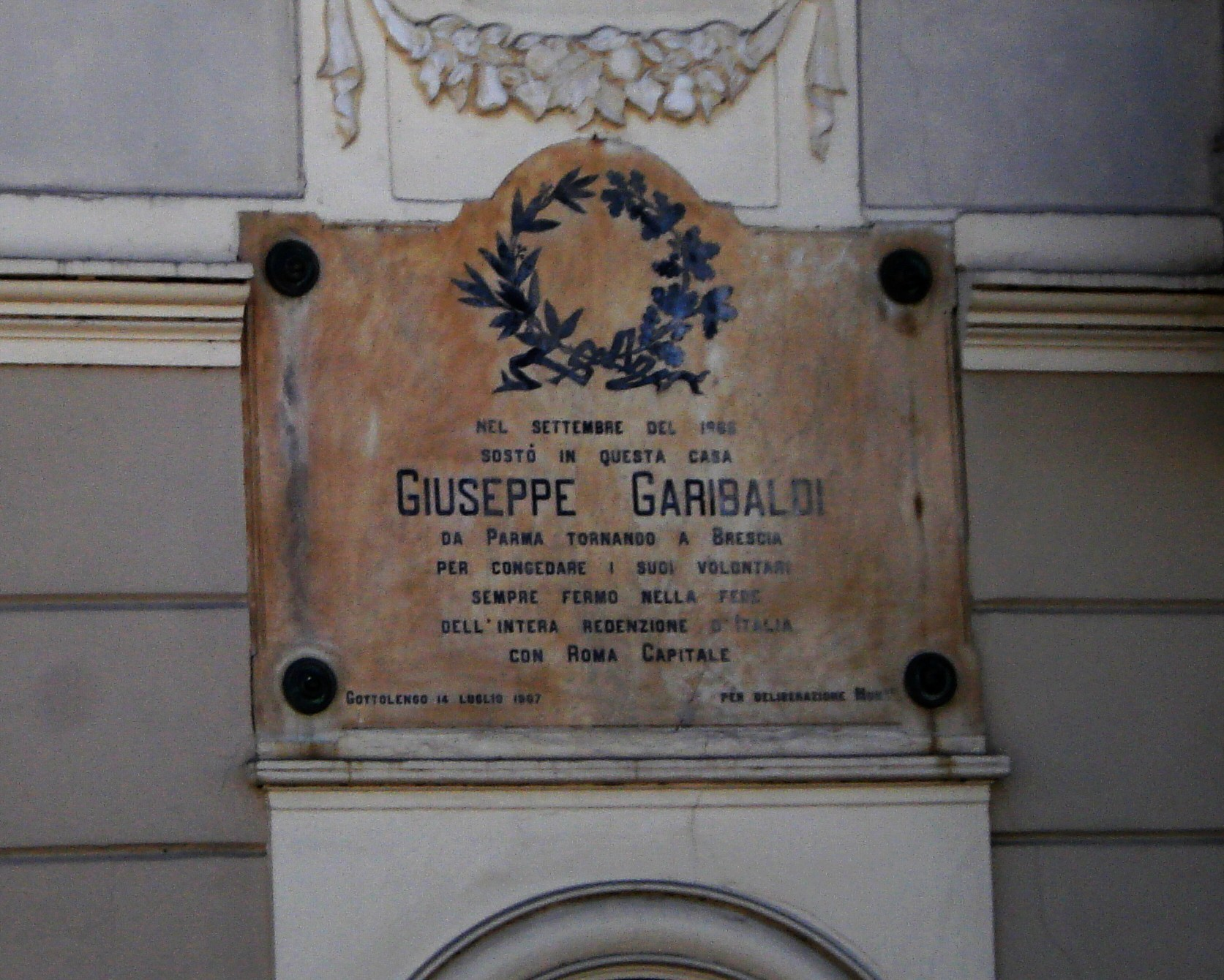
Plaque commemorating Garibaldi’s stay

The tower now functions as a small local museum, housing archaeological finds from the Castellaro area. A Lombard-origin legend claims a golden hen with chicks is hidden within. Another noteworthy building is the house where Giuseppe Garibaldi stayed in 1866, now containing small apartments but retaining a commemorative plaque spared by recent renovations.

=== Archaeological sites ===
Since the early 20th century, Gottolengo’s territory has been a focus of scientific research and archaeological discoveries. The initial finds occurred in the “Castellaro” area, a low plateau at the southern edge of the town center. This site bears evidence of settlements by groups such as the Cenomani and Romans, preserved in Gottolengo’s small civic museum within the tower house. Over the years, everyday objects such as rudimentary looms, weapons, bronze remnants, and a rare terracotta horn—among the world’s oldest sound-producing instruments—have surfaced. In 1925, the “Celtic Helmet from Gottolengo,” dating to the late 4th century BCE during the Cenomani settlement, was discovered, alongside numerous pins and metallic items, as well as Roman tombstones, including the one in the parish apse and another marking a vow to Apollo.

== Society ==
=== Demographic evolution ===
Between the 19th and 20th centuries, some people from Gottolengo, like many Italians, emigrated seeking fortune in the Americas (notably the United States and Argentina) or Australia. In the immediate post-World War II years, the municipality’s population peaked at 5,225 residents. During this period, even the now-deserted frazione of Solaro housed around 1,500 people in vast cascine a corte typical of the Po Valley, as well as some public buildings. Subsequent decades saw another migratory wave toward northern Italian cities such as Milan, Turin, Genoa, and Brescia, driven by job opportunities in emerging factories.

Historical population

Year	Pop.	±%
1861	2,466	—
1871	2,726	+10.5%
1881	2,750	+0.9%
1901	3,343	+21.6%
1911	3,965	+18.6%
1921	4,494	+13.3%
1931	4,886	+8.7%
1936	5,023	+2.8%

Year	Pop.	±%
1951	5,225	+4.0%
1961	4,239	−18.9%
1971	4,152	−2.1%
1981	4,347	+4.7%
1991	4,630	+6.5%
2001	4,777	+3.2%
2011	5,238	+9.7%
2021	4,957	−5.4%

Source: ISTAT

=== Ethnicities and foreign minorities ===
Like many Italian towns, especially in the Po Valley, Gottolengo hosts a notable foreign population. As of 1 January 2018, 599 foreign residents—approximately 11.6% of the total population—live in the municipality. The most represented nationalities are:

1. India, 273
2. Morocco, 122
3. Romania, 62
4. Albania, 31
5. Senegal, 29
6. China, 27

=== Languages and dialects ===
The sole official language across the municipality is Italian. Nonetheless, the Brescian dialect is widely spoken among both older and younger residents.

=== Religion ===
The municipality contains a single parish, part of the Diocese of Brescia.

The Neocatechumenal Way took root in Gottolengo’s parish in 1970, introduced by a mixed group of clergy and laity from Rome, approved by the bishop, marking the beginning of a catechetical journey. This spread was bolstered by the presence of Gottolengo native Mario Pezzi, considered one of the movement’s three founders. Since then, various communities have joined the Way; today, six distinct groups exist in the municipality.

The parish publishes a quarterly bulletin, “Il Redone,” styled as a newspaper due to its format, since 1964. It covers religious, cultural, and social topics and is based at Gottolengo’s pastoral center.

=== Traditions and folklore ===
A festival honoring Our Lady of Carmel occurs around mid-July, beginning with the veneration of Our Lady of Mount Carmel. Lasting about a week, it starts with a procession through the town: the Marian statue is carried from the Church of Saint Jerome to the parish church, where it remains displayed throughout the event, accompanied by the town fair.

== Culture ==
=== Education ===
The municipality hosts a comprehensive institute, housing a kindergarten and elementary school, alongside the Luigi Sturzo lower secondary school. Additionally, a parochial kindergarten, managed by the Fondazione P. Caprettini, operates in Gottolengo.

=== Media ===
Since 1990, Teleradio Gottolengo (TRG), a small television station, has been broadcasting from Gottolengo. Managed by the town’s curates and currently led by the provost, its programming focuses almost exclusively on local and religious content.

On July 30, 2022, TRG ceased over-the-air broadcasts and moved its programming to YouTube.

=== Theater ===
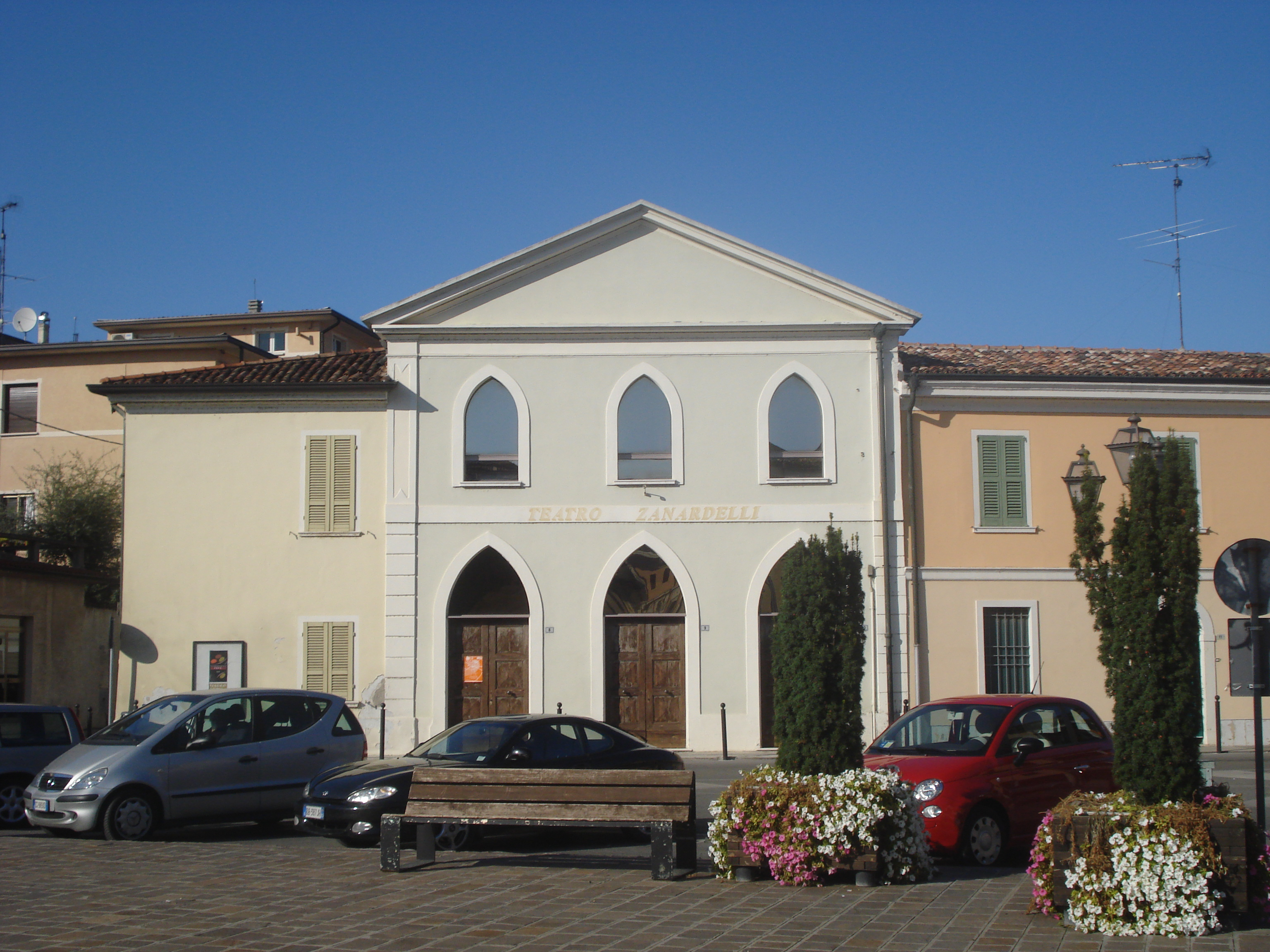
The Zanardelli Theater or municipal theater, viewed from the square

A cultural hub for Gottolengo and the broader Bassa Bresciana, the Zanardelli Theater—a late 19th-century Liberty style structure with two elevated floors—accommodates up to 200 spectators. It hosts annual performances by various companies. Dialect comedies are frequently staged by “QUO VADIS,” the sole local theater troupe, though its reach remains limited.

=== Cuisine ===
The potato, a symbol of Gottolengo’s agricultural tradition, is celebrated with a festival established in 2002, typically held in September, earning a municipal designation of origin. Another local specialty is jam. Also prevalent, though common across Lombardy, are pumpkin tortelli, traditionally eaten on Christmas Eve, and Brescian-style spit-roast.

== Anthropic geography ==
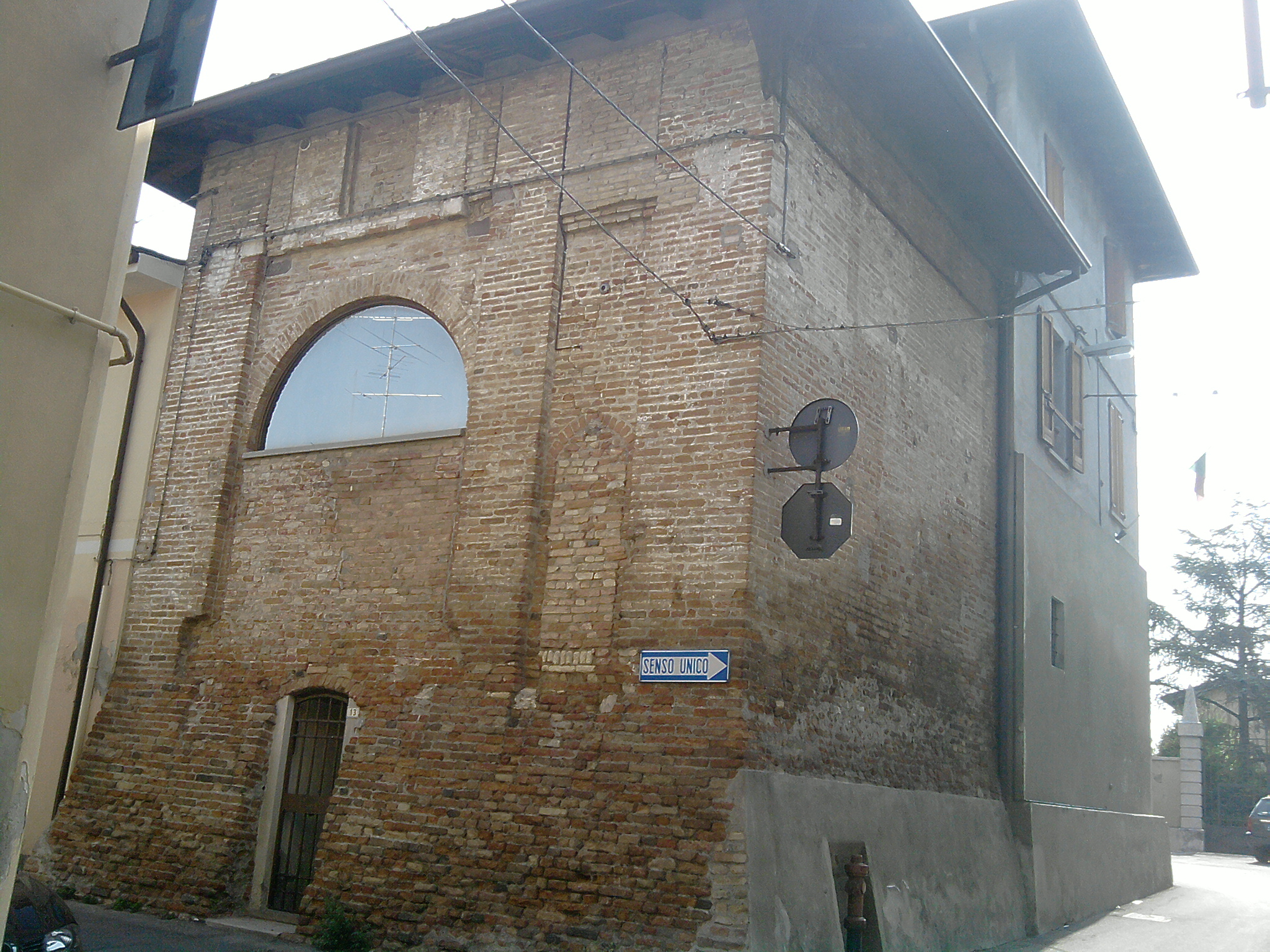
The tower house, a remnant of the ancient defensive system

=== Urban planning ===
The current town center began to be settled around the mid-2nd century BCE by the Romans, though their settlements were scattered and lacked a fixed layout.

This changed with the arrival of the Lombards: King Desiderius gifted Gottolengo to the abbots of the Abbey of Leno, who fortified the town following 10th-century Hungarian invasions. They built a fortified village encircled by a moat and defended by earthworks, containing the monastic curtis with the lord’s house, church, and servants’ homes; outside the walls lay peasants’ huts, offering refuge during threats. As population grew, the village expanded, forming a true encastellation, but with the advent of firearms, its defenses fell into ruin. During the Napoleonic era, the center gained prominence, new districts emerged, decaying walls were demolished, and old moats were filled, leaving the tower house as the sole vestige of the former system.

Since then, Gottolengo’s urban layout has remained largely unchanged. Notable developments in the 1960s and 1970s included two small Marcolini villages. Today, the municipality features green spaces (parks) according to the General Regulatory Plan, while the landfill, outside the town center, has been rehabilitated to meet current standards; the municipal aqueduct located in the city is managed by A2A, as well as the entire sewerage system of Gottolengo and the purification services. The territory faces no naturalistic or landscape restrictions.

=== Frazioni ===
Gottolengo encompasses seven frazioni, with Solaro historically the most significant. The others—modest in size with a few dozen residents each—are Solerino, Baldone, Remaglie, Segalana, Monticelle Sopra, and Osteria.

==== Solaro ====
Historically, Solaro was Gottolengo’s sole notable outlying locality. Its name, of Roman origin, derives from the Latin Solarium, meaning “sunlit terrace.”

Solaro proved vital during World War II, serving as a refuge. Today, it consists of an abandoned traditional Brescian cascina a corte and an ancient church dedicated to Saint Anthony the Great, a protector of animals and a revered figure locally. The surrounding countryside features both old and new farmhouses amid cultivated fields. A municipal road links Solaro to the town, extending to the provincial road between Ghedi and Isorella.

== Economy ==
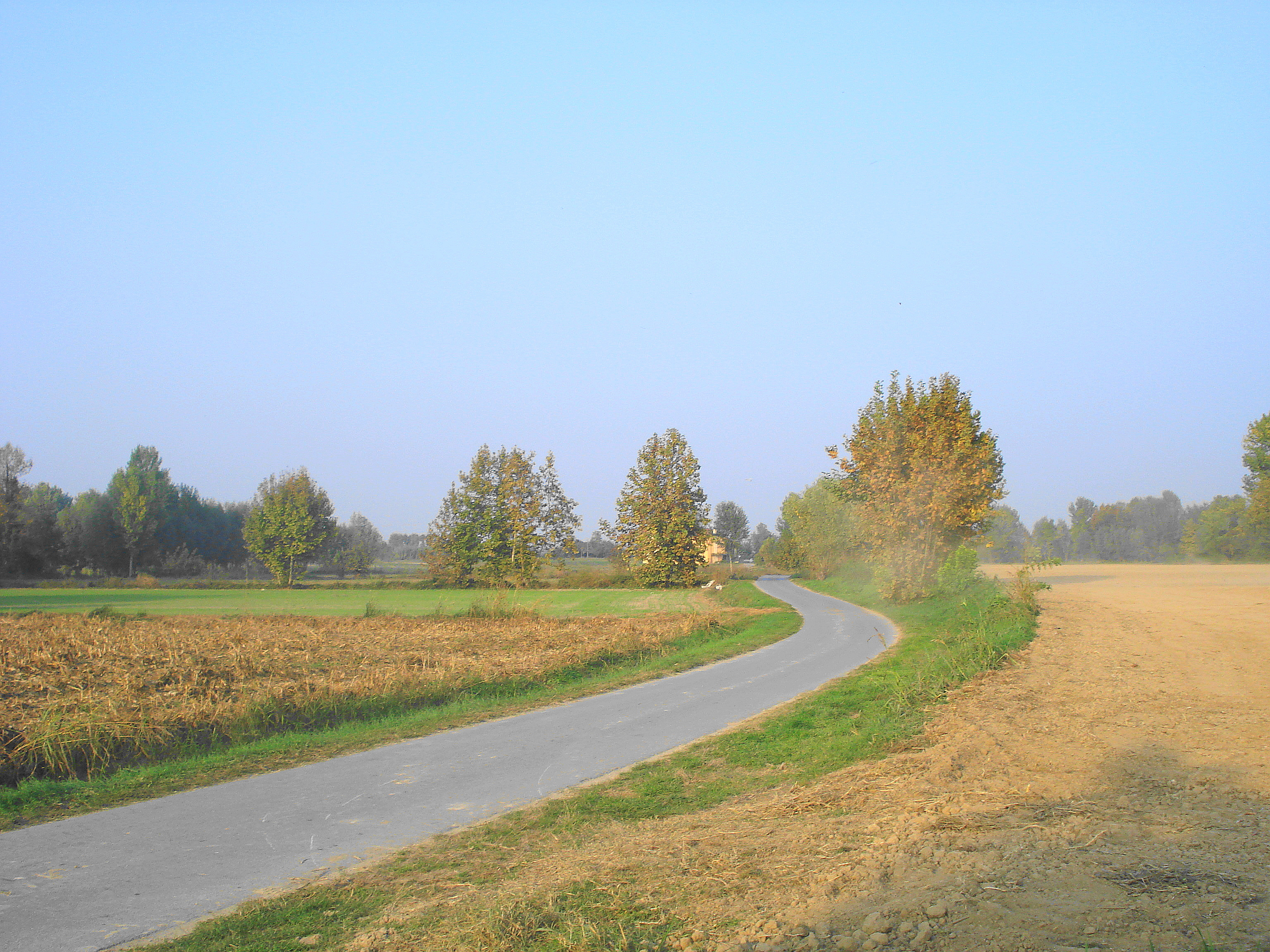
Road through fallow fields

=== Agriculture ===
The earliest large-scale reclamation efforts were undertaken by the monks of Leno Abbey, draining marshlands to enable agriculture and livestock rearing. Further reclamation and extensive canalization between the 18th and 20th centuries shaped the current Gottolengo countryside. Today, the territory is almost entirely devoted to agriculture, with fields cultivated using intensive methods typical of the Po Valley and northern Italy. Major crops include corn and wheat, with smaller yields of soybeans and potatoes.
Cattle, poultry and pig farming are well developed, while sheep farming is absent. Beekeeping is also practiced.

=== Industry ===
During the Venetian domination, the first textile factories were established, but the real industrial boom came in the 1960s, when the Bassa Bresciana was declared an economically depressed area. This spurred significant funding and tax incentives, fostering modern industrial growth and diversification.
Gottolengo is famous for its chestnut preserves (a sweet made with chestnuts from Val Camonica) and is the birthplace of Brescian quince jam. A family-run factory, operating since the early 20th century, produces mustards and assorted sauces. Other local plants manufacture staples, operate in the mechanical and electrical sectors, and process dairy and food products.

== Infrastructure and transport ==
=== Roads ===
Key arteries serving the municipality are Provincial Road VIII, linking it north to Leno and south to Gambara, and Provincial Road 11, running from Pavone del Mella through Gottolengo to Isorella.

=== Railways and tramways ===
From 1914 to 1932, Gottolengo’s station was served by a tramway on the Brescia-Ostiano line, branching toward Gambara from the Pavone del Mella junction.

=== Urban transportation ===
The municipality lies within the local public transport subnetwork of the Province of Brescia, encompassing the Lower Brescia Plain, the Sebino area, and Franciacorta. Intercity transportation is provided by buses operated by the Trasporti Brescia Sud consortium, composed of SIA, SAIA Trasporti and APAM.

== Administration ==
Below is the list of mayors of Gottolengo since the end of the Second World War:

Period		Office holder	Party	Title	Notes
1945	1951	Battista Antonini		Mayor	
1951	1958	Oreste Benvenuti		Mayor	
1959	1960	Amedeo Andrini		Mayor	
1960	1962	Mario Frigerio		Mayor	
1962	1964	Amedeo Andrini		Mayor	
1965	1975	Cesare Gibellini		Mayor	
1975	1979	Giorgio Mattarozzi		Mayor	
1979	1993	Giuliana Pezzi		Mayor	

Below is the list of mayors directly elected by citizens (since 1993):

Period		Office holder	Party	Title	Notes
November 22, 1993	November 17, 1997	Sergio Antonini	PDS	Mayor	
November 17, 1997	May 28, 2002	Romano Manfredi	Center-right civic list	Mayor	
May 28, 2002	May 7, 2012	Giuliana Pezzi	Center-right civic list	Mayor	
May 7, 2012	June 12, 2022	Giacomo Massa	Center-right civic list	Mayor	
June 12, 2022	In office	Daniele Dancelli	Center-right civic list	Mayor	

== Sports ==
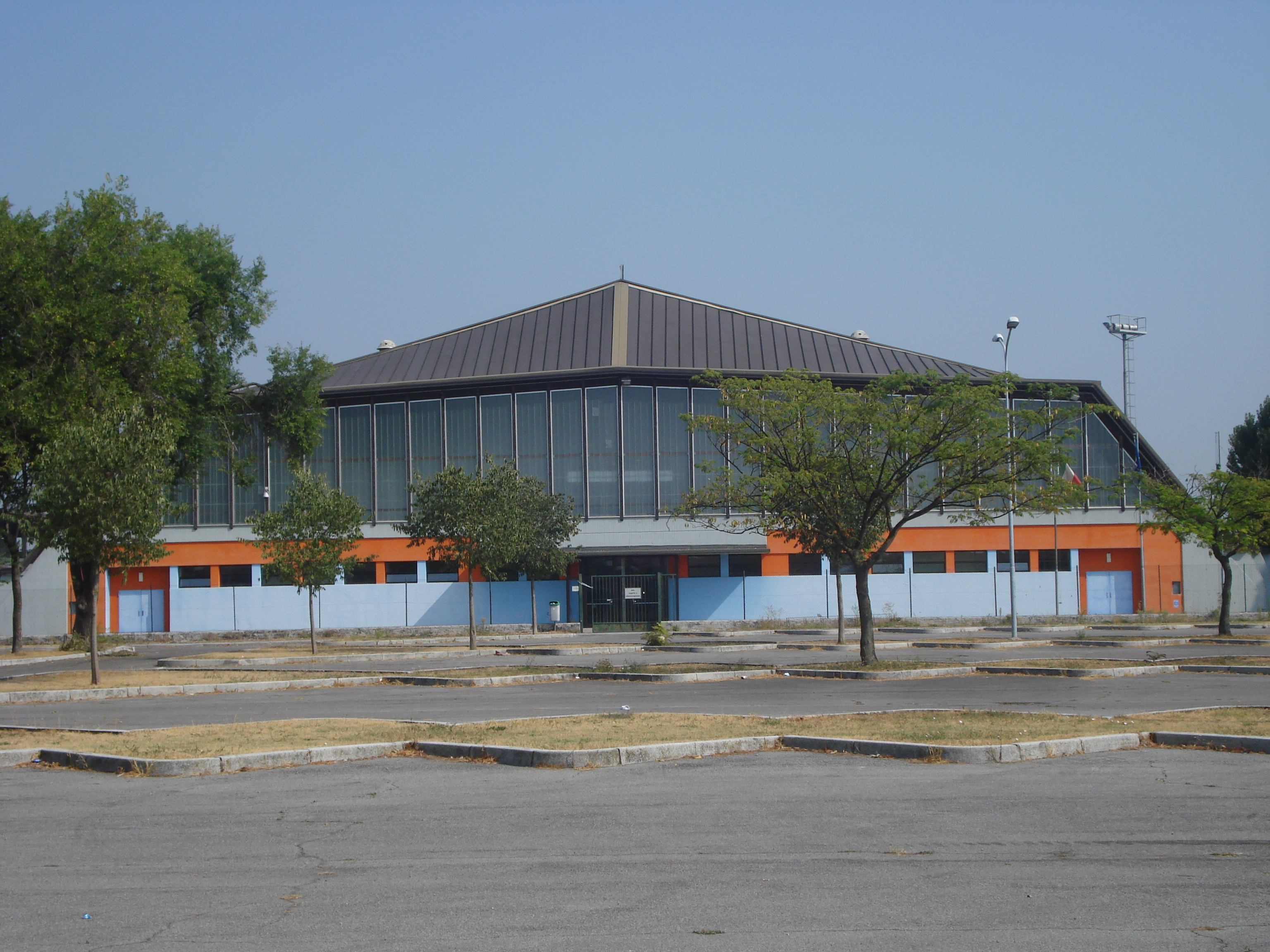
The sports hall

A prominent sport in Gottolengo is volleyball, with the women’s volleyball team Juvolley competing in Serie D, having reached Serie A in the 1970s. Other sports, such as football, karate, and basketball, are practiced recreationally.

The primary sports facility is the sports hall, built in the 1990s, featuring a grass football pitch, two tennis courts, and a gymnasium.

== Bibliography ==
- Albertini, Mario; Cerioli, Claudio (1994). Trasporti nella Provincia di Cremona - 100 anni di storia [Transport in the Province of Cremona - 100 Years of History] (in Italian) (2 ed.). Cremona: Editrice Turris. p. 116. ISBN 88-85635-89-X.
- Barocelli, Piero (1971). Il Castellaro di Gottolengo [The Castellaro of Gottolengo] (in Italian). Brescia: Ateneo.
- Beretta, Claudio (2003). Parlate e dialetti della Lombardia. Lessico comparato [Speech and Dialects of Lombardy. Comparative Lexicon] (in Italian). Milan: Mondadori. ISBN 88-04-51475-2.
- Bonaglia, Angelo (1985). Gottolengo dalle origini neolitiche all'età dei comuni: Sec. XXIII a.C. - Sec. XIII d.C. [Gottolengo from Neolithic Origins to the Age of the Communes: 23rd Century BCE - 13th Century CE] (in Italian). Brescia: Apollonio. OCLC 878105766.
- Bonaglia, Angelo (2003). Gottolengo: 1250-1500 Storia e documenti [Gottolengo: 1250-1500 History and Documents] (in Italian). Cigole: Comune di Gottolengo.
- Bonaglia, Angelo; Celsa, Maria Teresa (2007). Gottolengo: il Cinquecento Storia e documenti [Gottolengo: The 16th Century History and Documents] (in Italian). Cigole: Comune di Gottolengo. OCLC 213409267.
- Bonaglia, Angelo; Superfluo, Alberto (2007). Gottolengo: il Seicento Storia e documenti [Gottolengo: The 17th Century History and Documents] (in Italian). Cigole: Comune di Gottolengo. OCLC 213260064.
- Carancini, Gian Luigi (1975). Die Nadeln in Italien [The Needles in Italy] (in German). C.H. Beck. ISBN 3-406-00760-0.
- Fappani, Antonio; Andrico, Gian Mario (1998). Agro bresciano "La Bassa fra Chiese e Mella [Brescian Countryside "The Lower Area between Chiese and Mella] (in Italian). Roccafranca: Territori Bresciani. Storia Econ. Cultura. ISBN 88-8486-120-9.
- Paoletti, Dezio (1987). Bassa Bresciana: un patrimonio ambientale e culturale da conoscere e valorizzare [Bassa Bresciana: an environmental and cultural heritage to be discovered and appreciated] (in Italian). Bagnolo Mella: Fondazione Civiltà Bresciana. [ISBN unspecified]
- Lucini, Pierino (1988). "Reperti preistorici" [Prehistoric Finds]. Gottolengo dalla preistoria alla romanità [Gottolengo from Prehistory to Roman Times] (in Italian). OCLC 749787179.
- Messineo, Salvatore (2003). La storia della pallavolo bresciana [The History of Brescian Volleyball] (in Italian). Roccafranca: La compagnia della stampa. ISBN 88-8486-050-4.
- Romano, Tommaso (1998). ...'na quàt paròlå dèlå Bàså Bresànå [...A Few Words of the Lower Brescia area] (in Italian).
- Schiapparelli, Luigi (1924). I diplomi dei re d'Italia del secolo X [The Diplomas of the Kings of Italy in the 10th Century] (in Italian). Rome: Forzani e C. [ISBN unspecified]
- Superfluo, Alberto (1978). L'oratorio della Madonna d'Incidella in Gottolengo [The Oratory of the Madonna of Incidella in Gottolengo] (in Italian). Brescia: Zanetti. [ISBN unspecified]
- Zamboni, Baldassarre (1784). A sua Eccellenza il N.H. Gianfranco Sagredo, senatore chiarissimo, eletto protettore della Comunità di Gottolengo [To His Excellency the Noble Gianfranco Sagredo, Most Illustrious Senator, Elected Protector of the Gottolengo Community] (in Italian). Brescia. [ISBN unspecified]
