= Pippo (airplane) =

Mythical 1940s Italian aircraft

Pippo was an airplane in folklore, unique to Northern Italy, that flew during World War II. An example of oral history, Pippo is not well documented even in Italy.

== Overview ==
Pippo had a distinctive buzz, was rarely if ever seen and flew mainly at night. If people were faithful to the Fascists, they considered it an Allied plane. If people were supporters of the Allies, it was thought to be a Luftwaffe or Italian Air Force aircraft. No matter what their political allegiances, people personified it as a “he” – the plane and the pilot as one. It is suspected that the Italian government used Pippo as a propaganda tool to turn ordinary civilians against the Allies, though there is no doubt the plane was real.

It is unclear how Pippo got its name. It may have been a play on the Italian moniker for Disney's Goofy character or alternatively was based on the pip-pip sounds it apparently made.

Despite the unthreatening name, people mainly interpreted Pippo as something fearful. Superstition held that one had to block the lights in one's house or Pippo might fire upon it. It was said to drop exploding pens, poisoned candy, or so-called butterfly bombs and to fire on farm workers in fields.

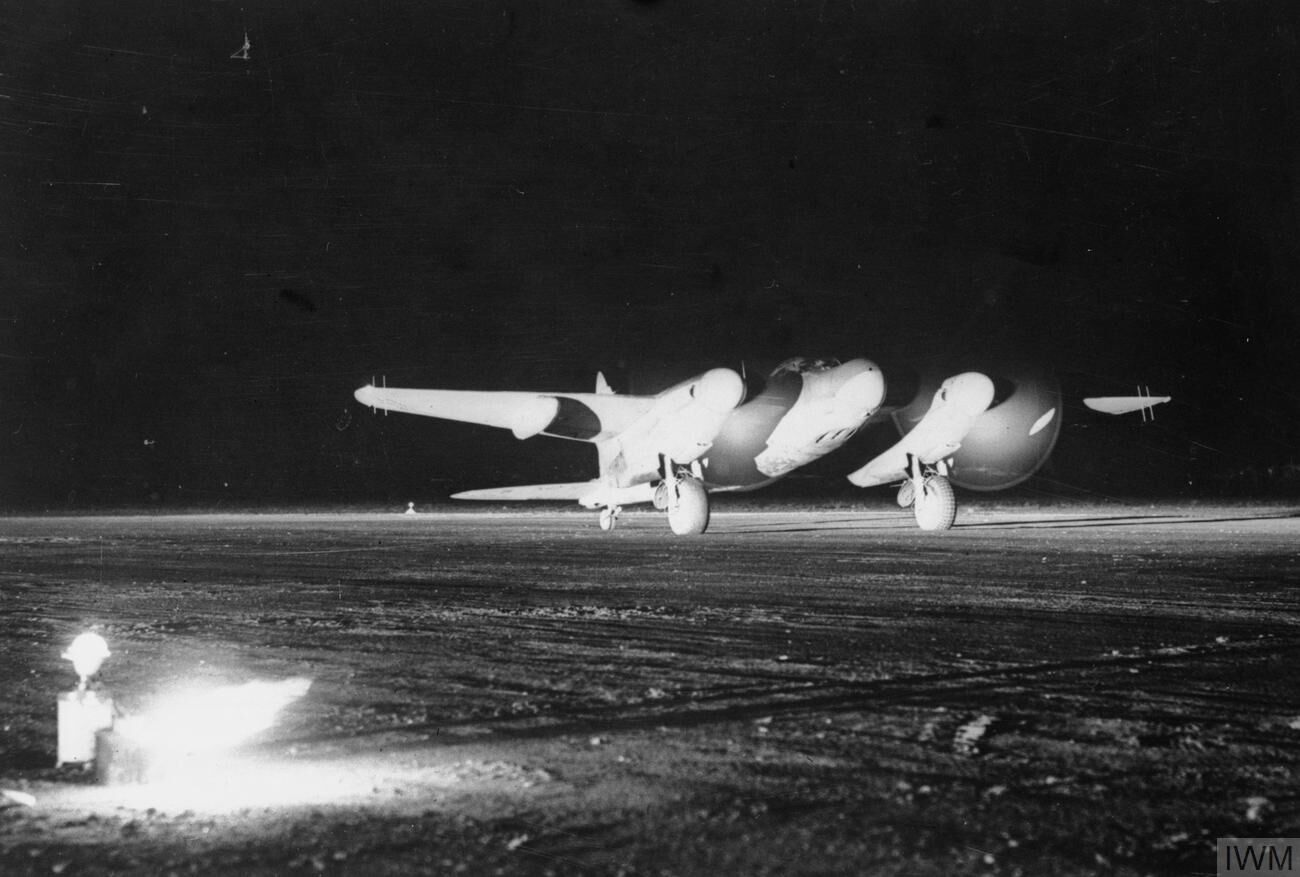
A deHavilland Mosquito taking off from Foggia airport for a night sortie in 1944.

Only decades later did historians surmise the likely origin of the plane. When the Allies gained a foothold in Italy in the later years of the war, pilots began flying tactical night missions to survey and intervene in German troop movements. It never occurred to them that they were inadvertently terrorizing the countryside. In particular, the Royal Air Force used a plane called the de Havilland Mosquito.

== References in literature ==
- Brideshead Revisited – Evelyn Waugh
- The Mysterious Flame of Queen Loana – Umberto Eco
- Ciao Bella – Gina Buonaguro & Janice Kirk
- The Curse of Pietro Houdini - Derek B. Miller
