= Pavone del Mella =

- Comune
- Comune di Pavone del Mella
- Location within Italy Location within Lombardy
- Coordinates: 45°18′N 10°12′E
- Country: Italy
- Region: Lombardy
- Province: Province of Brescia (BS)

Government
  - Mayor: Maria Teresa Vivaldini

Area
  - Total: 11 km^{2} (4.2 sq mi)

Population (2011)
  - Total: 2,850
  - Density: 260/km^{2} (670/sq mi)
- Time zone: UTC+1 (CET)
  - Summer (DST): UTC+2 (CEST)
- Postal code: 25020
- Dialing code: 030
- Patron saint: San Benedetto
- Saint day: March 21st
- Website: Official website

Pavone del Mella (Brescian: Paù) is a comune in the province of Brescia, in Lombardy. It is situated on the left bank of the river Mella.
