= Remedello =

Remedello Remedél
- Comune
- Comune di Remedello
- Location within Italy Location within Lombardy
- Coordinates: 45°17′N 10°22′E
- Country: Italy
- Region: Lombardy
- Province: Brescia (BS)
- Frazioni: Remedello Sopra, Remedello Sotto

Area
  - Total: 21 km^{2} (8.1 sq mi)
- Elevation: 47 m (154 ft)

Population (2011)
  - Total: 3,431
  - Density: 160/km^{2} (420/sq mi)
- Demonym: Remedellesi
- Time zone: UTC+1 (CET)
  - Summer (DST): UTC+2 (CEST)
- Postal code: 25010
- Dialing code: 030
- ISTAT code: 017160
- Patron saint: San Donato and San Lorenzo
- Saint day: 6 August and 10 August
- Website: Official website

Remedello (Brescian: Remedél) is a comune in the Italian province of Brescia, in Lombardy.
