= List of municipalities of the Province of Brescia =

The following is a list of the 205 municipalities (comuni) of the Province of Brescia in the region of Lombardy in Italy.

== List ==
| Municipality | Population (2026) | Area (km²) | Density |
|---|---|---|---|
| Acquafredda | 1,549 | 9.55 | 162.2 |
| Adro | 7,196 | 14.29 | 503.6 |
| Agnosine | 1,646 | 13.55 | 121.5 |
| Alfianello | 2,307 | 13.75 | 167.8 |
| Anfo | 439 | 23.83 | 18.4 |
| Angolo Terme | 2,324 | 30.56 | 76.0 |
| Artogne | 3,714 | 21.02 | 176.7 |
| Azzano Mella | 3,519 | 10.57 | 332.9 |
| Bagnolo Mella | 12,536 | 31.35 | 399.9 |
| Bagolino | 3,738 | 109.21 | 34.2 |
| Barbariga | 2,307 | 11.34 | 203.4 |
| Barghe | 1,138 | 5.49 | 207.3 |
| Bassano Bresciano | 2,363 | 9.42 | 250.8 |
| Bedizzole | 12,266 | 26.44 | 463.9 |
| Berlingo | 2,751 | 4.59 | 599.3 |
| Berzo Demo | 1,444 | 15.46 | 93.4 |
| Berzo Inferiore | 2,522 | 21.92 | 115.1 |
| Bienno | 3,756 | 46.80 | 80.3 |
| Bione | 1,319 | 17.29 | 76.3 |
| Borgo San Giacomo | 5,590 | 29.53 | 189.3 |
| Borgosatollo | 9,099 | 8.42 | 1,080.6 |
| Borno | 2,403 | 30.50 | 78.8 |
| Botticino | 10,849 | 18.48 | 587.1 |
| Bovegno | 2,012 | 47.99 | 41.9 |
| Bovezzo | 7,386 | 6.41 | 1,152.3 |
| Brandico | 1,767 | 8.38 | 210.9 |
| Braone | 681 | 13.36 | 51.0 |
| Breno | 4,674 | 59.94 | 78.0 |
| Brescia | 201,342 | 90.34 | 2,228.7 |
| Brione | 759 | 6.90 | 110.0 |
| Caino | 2,180 | 17.31 | 125.9 |
| Calcinato | 13,147 | 33.30 | 394.8 |
| Calvagese della Riviera | 3,679 | 11.74 | 313.4 |
| Calvisano | 8,461 | 44.83 | 188.7 |
| Capo di Ponte | 2,293 | 18.11 | 126.6 |
| Capovalle | 332 | 22.95 | 14.5 |
| Capriano del Colle | 4,917 | 13.97 | 352.0 |
| Capriolo | 9,405 | 10.60 | 887.3 |
| Carpenedolo | 13,050 | 29.84 | 437.3 |
| Castegnato | 8,457 | 9.21 | 918.2 |
| Castel Mella | 10,961 | 7.53 | 1,455.6 |
| Castelcovati | 7,087 | 6.14 | 1,154.2 |
| Castenedolo | 11,643 | 26.20 | 444.4 |
| Casto | 1,613 | 21.34 | 75.6 |
| Castrezzato | 7,984 | 13.63 | 585.8 |
| Cazzago San Martino | 10,784 | 22.34 | 482.7 |
| Cedegolo | 1,129 | 11.08 | 101.9 |
| Cellatica | 4,815 | 6.55 | 735.1 |
| Cerveno | 707 | 21.55 | 32.8 |
| Ceto | 1,775 | 32.30 | 55.0 |
| Cevo | 771 | 35.47 | 21.7 |
| Chiari | 19,717 | 37.96 | 519.4 |
| Cigole | 1,503 | 9.93 | 151.4 |
| Cimbergo | 526 | 24.71 | 21.3 |
| Cividate Camuno | 2,687 | 3.31 | 811.8 |
| Coccaglio | 8,937 | 12.05 | 741.7 |
| Collebeato | 4,469 | 5.27 | 848.0 |
| Collio | 1,955 | 53.48 | 36.6 |
| Cologne | 7,608 | 13.79 | 551.7 |
| Comezzano-Cizzago | 4,202 | 15.44 | 272.2 |
| Concesio | 15,735 | 19.08 | 824.7 |
| Corte Franca | 7,150 | 13.97 | 511.8 |
| Corteno Golgi | 1,909 | 82.61 | 23.1 |
| Corzano | 1,540 | 12.30 | 125.2 |
| Darfo Boario Terme | 15,974 | 36.07 | 442.9 |
| Dello | 5,686 | 23.32 | 243.8 |
| Desenzano del Garda | 29,353 | 59.26 | 495.3 |
| Edolo | 4,447 | 88.90 | 50.0 |
| Erbusco | 8,852 | 16.24 | 545.1 |
| Esine | 5,055 | 30.31 | 166.8 |
| Fiesse | 2,095 | 16.02 | 130.8 |
| Flero | 8,812 | 9.84 | 895.5 |
| Gambara | 4,760 | 31.59 | 150.7 |
| Gardone Riviera | 2,568 | 21.39 | 120.1 |
| Gardone Val Trompia | 11,599 | 26.66 | 435.1 |
| Gargnano | 2,615 | 76.75 | 34.1 |
| Gavardo | 12,438 | 29.80 | 417.4 |
| Ghedi | 18,546 | 60.84 | 304.8 |
| Gianico | 2,078 | 13.38 | 155.3 |
| Gottolengo | 5,051 | 29.28 | 172.5 |
| Gussago | 16,663 | 25.09 | 664.1 |
| Idro | 1,873 | 22.89 | 81.8 |
| Incudine | 345 | 19.67 | 17.5 |
| Irma | 135 | 4.93 | 27.4 |
| Iseo | 8,969 | 28.42 | 315.6 |
| Isorella | 4,123 | 15.33 | 268.9 |
| Lavenone | 508 | 31.82 | 16.0 |
| Leno | 14,474 | 58.45 | 247.6 |
| Limone sul Garda | 1,096 | 23.03 | 47.6 |
| Lodrino | 1,627 | 16.50 | 98.6 |
| Lograto | 3,845 | 12.43 | 309.3 |
| Lonato del Garda | 17,168 | 68.20 | 251.7 |
| Longhena | 565 | 3.47 | 162.8 |
| Losine | 647 | 6.26 | 103.4 |
| Lozio | 365 | 23.74 | 15.4 |
| Lumezzane | 21,742 | 31.72 | 685.4 |
| Maclodio | 1,478 | 5.10 | 289.8 |
| Magasa | 104 | 19.11 | 5.4 |
| Mairano | 3,498 | 11.53 | 303.4 |
| Malegno | 1,925 | 6.89 | 279.4 |
| Malonno | 2,997 | 31.46 | 95.3 |
| Manerba del Garda | 5,415 | 36.63 | 147.8 |
| Manerbio | 13,630 | 27.88 | 488.9 |
| Marcheno | 4,152 | 22.74 | 182.6 |
| Marmentino | 648 | 18.04 | 35.9 |
| Marone | 3,096 | 23.93 | 129.4 |
| Mazzano | 12,715 | 15.73 | 808.3 |
| Milzano | 1,704 | 8.49 | 200.7 |
| Moniga del Garda | 2,682 | 14.65 | 183.1 |
| Monno | 515 | 31.03 | 16.6 |
| Monte Isola | 1,576 | 12.61 | 125.0 |
| Monticelli Brusati | 4,556 | 10.89 | 418.4 |
| Montichiari | 26,506 | 81.66 | 324.6 |
| Montirone | 5,161 | 10.52 | 490.6 |
| Mura | 765 | 12.51 | 61.2 |
| Muscoline | 2,730 | 10.08 | 270.8 |
| Nave | 10,627 | 27.21 | 390.6 |
| Niardo | 1,949 | 22.16 | 88.0 |
| Nuvolento | 3,962 | 7.46 | 531.1 |
| Nuvolera | 4,777 | 13.31 | 358.9 |
| Odolo | 1,948 | 6.54 | 297.9 |
| Offlaga | 4,167 | 23.03 | 180.9 |
| Ome | 3,103 | 9.85 | 315.0 |
| Ono San Pietro | 973 | 13.78 | 70.6 |
| Orzinuovi | 12,496 | 47.87 | 261.0 |
| Orzivecchi | 2,517 | 9.94 | 253.2 |
| Ospitaletto | 14,969 | 9.29 | 1,611.3 |
| Ossimo | 1,439 | 14.86 | 96.8 |
| Padenghe sul Garda | 4,912 | 26.81 | 183.2 |
| Paderno Franciacorta | 3,667 | 5.61 | 653.7 |
| Paisco Loveno | 164 | 35.87 | 4.6 |
| Paitone | 2,248 | 8.00 | 281.0 |
| Palazzolo sull'Oglio | 20,603 | 23.04 | 894.2 |
| Paratico | 5,023 | 6.18 | 812.8 |
| Paspardo | 576 | 11.15 | 51.7 |
| Passirano | 6,842 | 13.39 | 511.0 |
| Pavone del Mella | 2,717 | 11.61 | 234.0 |
| Pertica Alta | 549 | 20.92 | 26.2 |
| Pertica Bassa | 543 | 30.13 | 18.0 |
| Pezzaze | 1,419 | 21.49 | 66.0 |
| Pian Camuno | 4,826 | 10.95 | 440.7 |
| Piancogno | 4,787 | 14.30 | 334.8 |
| Pisogne | 7,901 | 49.23 | 160.5 |
| Polaveno | 2,531 | 9.20 | 275.1 |
| Polpenazze del Garda | 2,735 | 9.12 | 299.9 |
| Pompiano | 3,755 | 15.27 | 245.9 |
| Poncarale | 5,192 | 12.64 | 410.8 |
| Ponte di Legno | 1,756 | 100.43 | 17.5 |
| Pontevico | 7,131 | 29.21 | 244.1 |
| Pontoglio | 7,004 | 11.09 | 631.6 |
| Pozzolengo | 3,577 | 21.33 | 167.7 |
| Pralboino | 2,850 | 17.16 | 166.1 |
| Preseglie | 1,470 | 11.45 | 128.4 |
| Prevalle | 6,902 | 9.99 | 690.9 |
| Provaglio d'Iseo | 7,068 | 16.16 | 437.4 |
| Provaglio Val Sabbia | 844 | 14.85 | 56.8 |
| Puegnago sul Garda | 3,478 | 10.97 | 317.0 |
| Quinzano d'Oglio | 6,392 | 21.45 | 298.0 |
| Remedello | 3,446 | 21.46 | 160.6 |
| Rezzato | 13,592 | 18.21 | 746.4 |
| Roccafranca | 4,989 | 19.13 | 260.8 |
| Rodengo Saiano | 9,868 | 12.86 | 767.3 |
| Roè Volciano | 4,323 | 5.82 | 742.8 |
| Roncadelle | 9,315 | 9.39 | 992.0 |
| Rovato | 19,746 | 26.09 | 756.8 |
| Rudiano | 5,910 | 9.85 | 600.0 |
| Sabbio Chiese | 4,093 | 18.45 | 221.8 |
| Sale Marasino | 3,238 | 16.59 | 195.2 |
| Salò | 10,292 | 27.31 | 376.9 |
| San Felice del Benaco | 3,468 | 20.22 | 171.5 |
| San Gervasio Bresciano | 2,679 | 10.50 | 255.1 |
| San Paolo | 4,490 | 18.82 | 238.6 |
| San Zeno Naviglio | 4,733 | 6.25 | 757.3 |
| Sarezzo | 13,309 | 17.68 | 752.8 |
| Saviore dell'Adamello | 787 | 84.27 | 9.3 |
| Sellero | 1,380 | 14.47 | 95.4 |
| Seniga | 1,447 | 13.57 | 106.6 |
| Serle | 3,126 | 18.43 | 169.6 |
| Sirmione | 8,454 | 26.25 | 322.1 |
| Soiano del Lago | 1,953 | 5.77 | 338.5 |
| Sonico | 1,186 | 60.89 | 19.5 |
| Sulzano | 1,941 | 10.44 | 185.9 |
| Tavernole sul Mella | 1,200 | 19.81 | 60.6 |
| Temù | 1,154 | 43.26 | 26.7 |
| Tignale | 1,158 | 45.86 | 25.3 |
| Torbole Casaglia | 6,488 | 13.44 | 482.7 |
| Toscolano-Maderno | 7,655 | 58.17 | 131.6 |
| Travagliato | 14,007 | 17.74 | 789.6 |
| Tremosine sul Garda | 2,141 | 72.69 | 29.5 |
| Trenzano | 5,556 | 20.10 | 276.4 |
| Treviso Bresciano | 522 | 17.73 | 29.4 |
| Urago d'Oglio | 3,829 | 10.68 | 358.5 |
| Vallio Terme | 1,438 | 14.86 | 96.8 |
| Valvestino | 169 | 31.12 | 5.4 |
| Verolanuova | 8,168 | 25.76 | 317.1 |
| Verolavecchia | 3,893 | 21.06 | 184.9 |
| Vestone | 4,143 | 12.96 | 319.7 |
| Vezza d'Oglio | 1,461 | 54.15 | 27.0 |
| Villa Carcina | 10,721 | 14.22 | 753.9 |
| Villachiara | 1,355 | 16.87 | 80.3 |
| Villanuova sul Clisi | 5,929 | 9.10 | 651.5 |
| Vione | 621 | 35.27 | 17.6 |
| Visano | 2,020 | 11.22 | 180.0 |
| Vobarno | 8,485 | 53.22 | 159.4 |
| Zone | 1,041 | 19.68 | 52.9 |

== See also ==
- List of municipalities of Lombardy
- List of municipalities of Italy
