= Corzano =

Corzano Corsà
- Comune
- Comune di Corzano
- Corzano within the Province of Brescia

- Location within Italy Location within Lombardy
- Coordinates: 45°27′N 10°1′E
- Country: Italy
- Region: Lombardy
- Province: Brescia (BS)
- Frazioni: Bargnano, Meano, Montegiardino

Area
  - Total: 12 km^{2} (4.6 sq mi)
- Elevation: 101 m (331 ft)

Population (2011)
  - Total: 1,397
  - Density: 120/km^{2} (300/sq mi)
- Demonym: Corzanesi
- Time zone: UTC+1 (CET)
  - Summer (DST): UTC+2 (CEST)
- Postal code: 25030
- Dialing code: 030
- ISTAT code: 017064
- Website: Official website

Corzano (Brescian: Corsà) is a town and comune in the province of Brescia, in Lombardy, Italy. As of 2011 its population was 1,397.

== History ==
The name Corzano is derived from the Roman family name Curtius. In the 15th century the Avogadro family built a castle in the village Meano, which is part of the comune. It was part of the Republic of Venice until its dissolution at the end of the 18th century.

== Geography ==
Corzano is located at 45°26' North, 10°0' West approximately 100 metres (330 ft) above sea level. The bordering municipalities are Barbariga, Brandico, Comezzano-Cizzago, Dello, Longhena, Pompiano and Trenzano.

Corzano counts the hamlets (frazioni) of Bargnano, Meano and Montegiardino. The last one was an autonomous municipality until 1797.

== Demographics ==
The 2001 census gives the population as 980 people, composed of 359 families.
