= Maclodio =

Maclodio Maclo
- Comune
- Comune di Maclodio
- Location within Italy Location within Lombardy
- Coordinates: 45°29′N 10°3′E
- Country: Italy
- Region: Lombardy
- Province: Brescia (BS)
- Frazioni: Berlingo, Brandico, Lograto, Mairano, Trenzano

Area
  - Total: 5 km^{2} (1.9 sq mi)

Population (2011)
  - Total: 1,502
  - Density: 300/km^{2} (780/sq mi)
- Time zone: UTC+1 (CET)
  - Summer (DST): UTC+2 (CEST)
- Postal code: 25030
- Dialing code: 030
- ISTAT code: 017097
- Website: Official website

Maclodio (Brescian: Maclo) is a town and comune in the province of Brescia, in Lombardy.

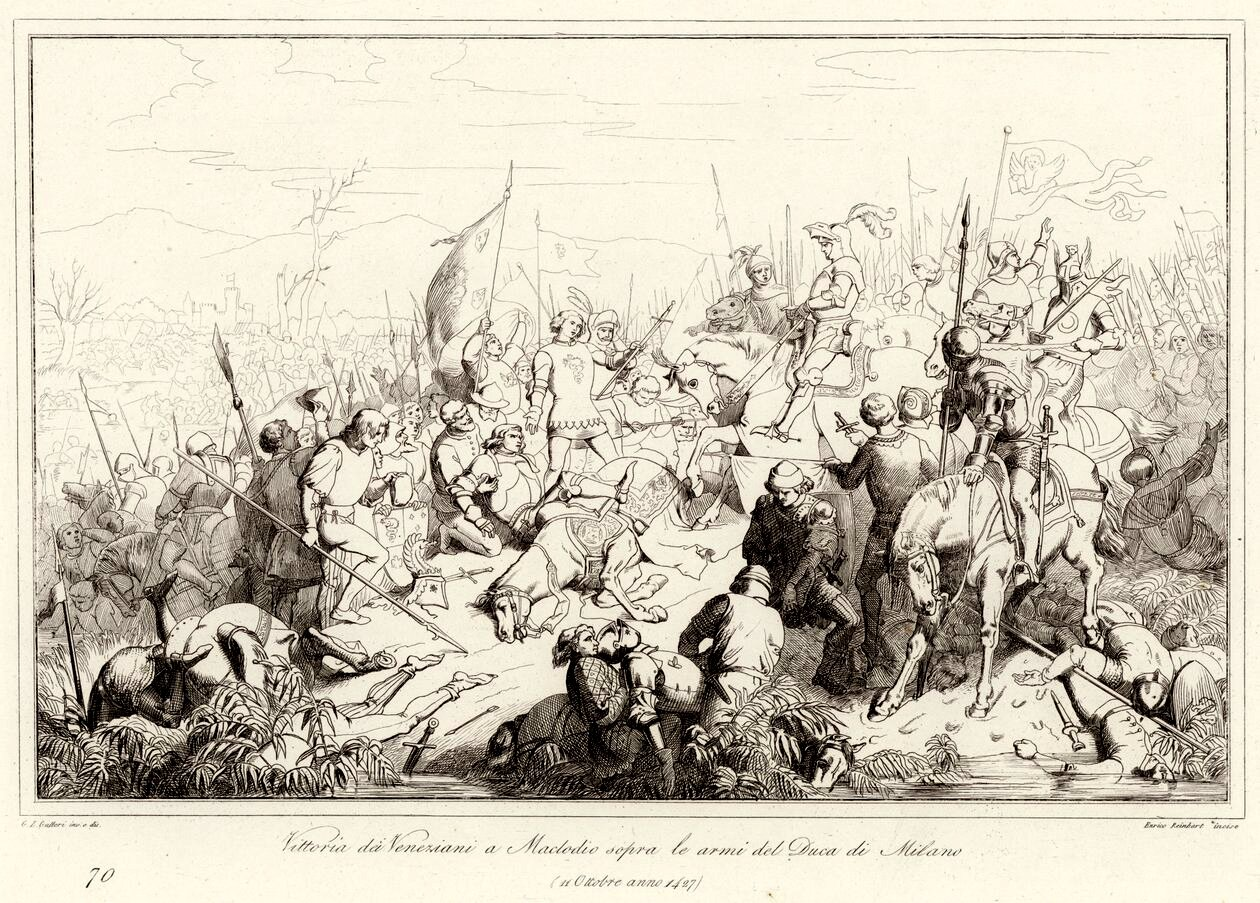
Victory of the Venetians over the arms of the Duke of Milan, Maclodio, October 11, 1427

The present‑day comune sits on the site of the Battle of Maclodio, fought on 11 October 1427 during the Wars in Lombardy, a series of conflicts between the Republic of Venice and the Duchy of Milan. In this decisive engagement, Venetian forces under Francesco Bussone da Carmagnola defeated the Milanese near the village now within the boundaries of the modern comune, securing Venetian control of Brescia and surrounding territory at that stage of the war. The battle is noted in academic discussions of Venetian military campaigns and early Renaissance warfare, and its outcome influenced subsequent territorial negotiations that shaped northern Italy’s political landscape. Further contemporary Venetian accounts of the battle and its reportage appear in studies of early 15th‑century Venetian culture and communication.
