= Orzivecchi =

Orzivecchi I Urs Vècc
- Comune
- Comune di Orzivecchi
- Location within Italy Location within Lombardy
- Coordinates: 45°25′N 9°58′E
- Country: Italy
- Region: Lombardy
- Province: Brescia (BS)
- Frazioni: Comezzano-Cizzago, Orzinuovi, Pompiano, Roccafranca

Area
  - Total: 9 km^{2} (3.5 sq mi)

Population (2011)
  - Total: 2,529
  - Density: 280/km^{2} (730/sq mi)
- Time zone: UTC+1 (CET)
  - Summer (DST): UTC+2 (CEST)
- Postal code: 25030
- Dialing code: 030
- ISTAT code: 017126
- Website: Official website

Orzivecchi (Brescian: I Urs Vècc) is a town and comune in the province of Brescia, in Lombardy.
