= Mairano =

Mairano Maerà
- Comune
- Comune
- Location within Italy Location within Lombardy
- Coordinates: 45°27′N 10°4′E
- Country: Italy
- Region: Lombardy
- Province: Brescia (BS)
- Frazioni: Azzano Mella, Brandico, Dello, Lograto, Longhena, Maclodio

Area
  - Total: 11 km^{2} (4.2 sq mi)

Population (31 December 2011)
  - Total: 3,377
  - Density: 310/km^{2} (800/sq mi)
- Time zone: UTC+1 (CET)
  - Summer (DST): UTC+2 (CEST)
- Postal code: 25030
- Dialing code: 030
- ISTAT code: 017099
- Website: Official website

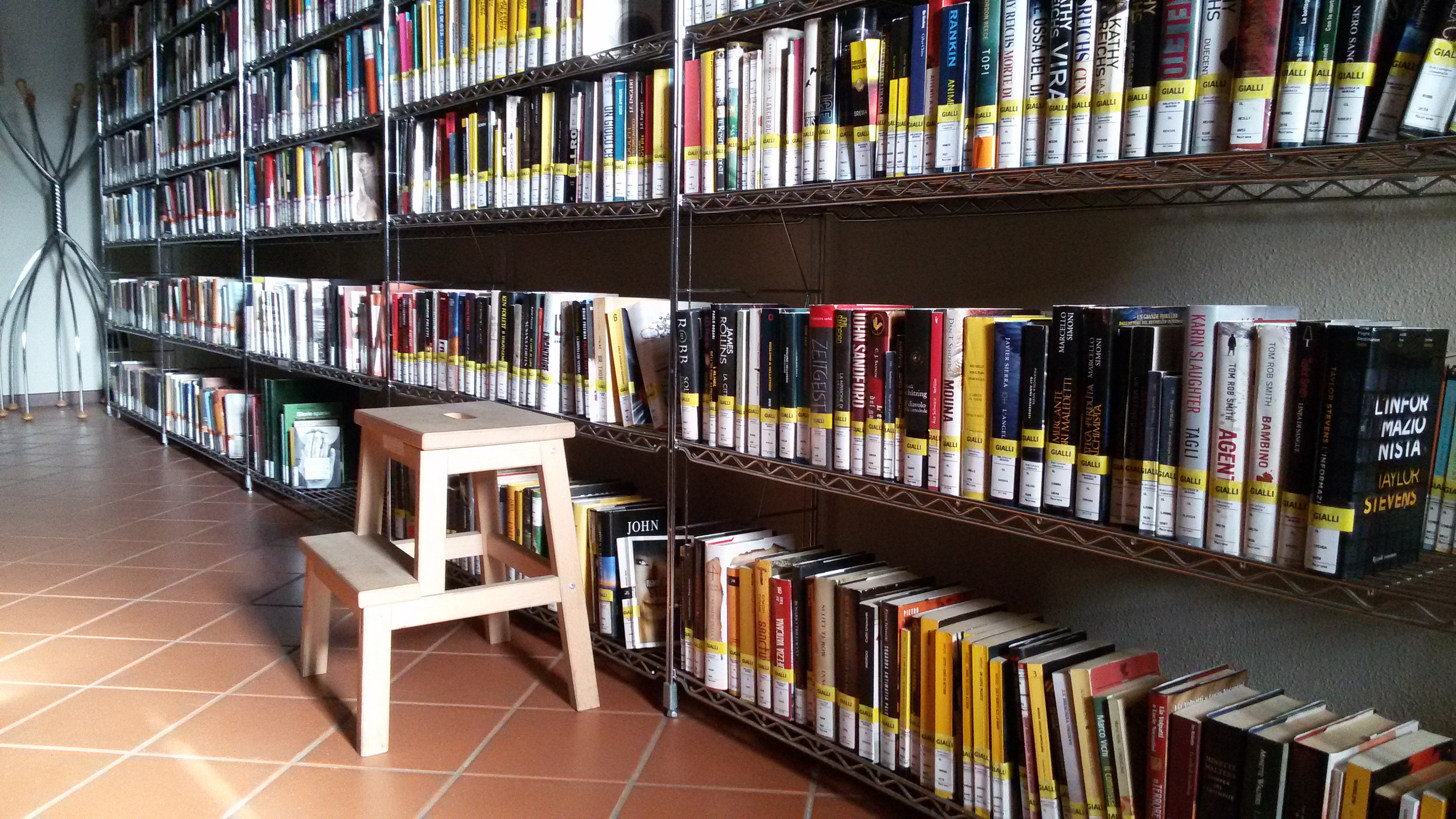
Shelves in the fiction section of the municipal library in Mairano, in the province of Brescia.

Mairano (Brescian: Maerà) is a town and comune in the province of Brescia, in Lombardy.
