= Lograto =

Lograto Logràt
- Comune
- Comune di Lograto
- Location within Italy Location within Lombardy
- Coordinates: 45°29′N 10°3′E
- Country: Italy
- Region: Lombardy
- Province: Brescia (BS)
- Frazioni: Navate

Area
  - Total: 12.1 km^{2} (4.7 sq mi)
- Elevation: 110 m (360 ft)

Population (2011)
  - Total: 3,913
  - Density: 323/km^{2} (838/sq mi)
- Demonym: Logratesi
- Time zone: UTC+1 (CET)
  - Summer (DST): UTC+2 (CEST)
- Postal code: 25030
- Dialing code: 030
- ISTAT code: 017091
- Patron saint: St. Giovanni Battista
- Saint day: 24 June
- Website: Official website

Lograto (Brescian: Logràt) is a town and comune in the province of Brescia, in Lombardy. Neighbouring communes are Azzano Mella, Torbole Casaglia, Travagliato, Berlingo, Maclodio and Mairano. It is located in a plain southwest of Brescia.
