= Seniga =

Seniga Siniga
- Comune
- Comune di Seniga
- Location within Italy Location within Lombardy
- Coordinates: 45°15′N 10°11′E
- Country: Italy
- Region: Lombardy
- Province: Brescia (BS)
- Frazioni: Alfianello, Gabbioneta-Binanuova (CR), Milzano, Ostiano (CR), Pralboino, Scandolara Ripa d'Oglio (CR)

Area
  - Total: 13 km^{2} (5.0 sq mi)

Population (31 December 2011)
  - Total: 1,624
  - Density: 120/km^{2} (320/sq mi)
- Time zone: UTC+1 (CET)
  - Summer (DST): UTC+2 (CEST)
- Postal code: 25020
- Dialing code: 030
- ISTAT code: 017177
- Website: Official website

Seniga (Brescian: Siniga) is a comune in the province of Brescia, located in Lombardy. It is bounded by other communes of Pralboino, Milzano, Alfianello. It is located on the Oglio river, that forms the border between Brescia and Cremona provinces. As of 2011, Seniga had a population of 1,624.
