= Longhena =

- Comune
- Comune di Longhena
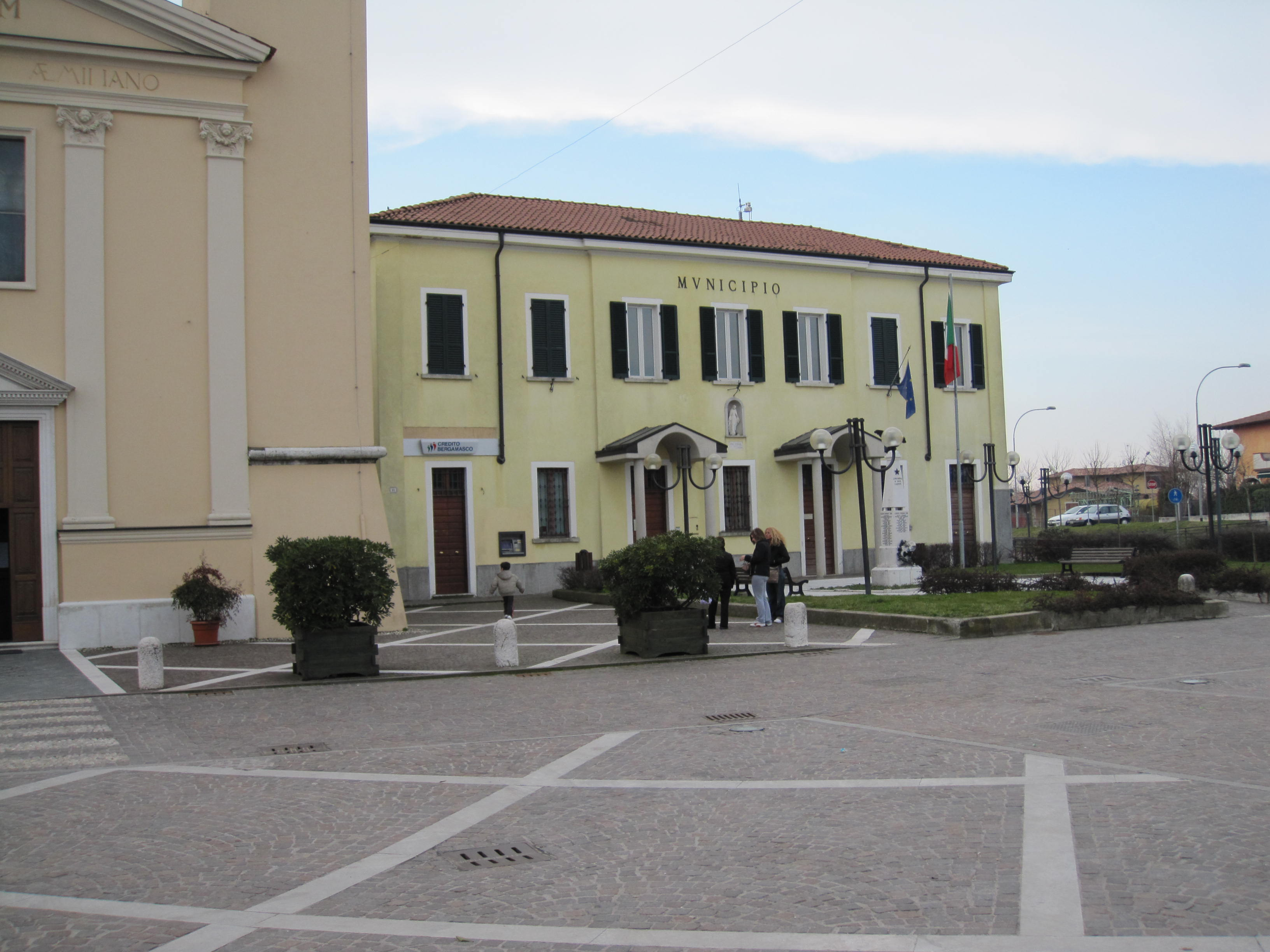
- Town hall

- Location within Italy Location within Lombardy
- Coordinates: 45°26′N 10°4′E
- Country: Italy
- Region: Lombardy
- Province: Brescia (BS)
- Frazioni: Brandico, Corzano, Dello, Mairano

Area
  - Total: 3.35 km^{2} (1.29 sq mi)
- Elevation: 93 m (305 ft)

Population (2011)
  - Total: 621
  - Density: 185/km^{2} (480/sq mi)
- Demonym: Longhenesi
- Time zone: UTC+1 (CET)
  - Summer (DST): UTC+2 (CEST)
- Postal code: 25030
- Dialing code: 030
- ISTAT code: 017093
- Patron saint: San Dionigi
- Saint day: 9 October

Longhena is an Italian town and comune in the province of Brescia, in Lombardy.
