= San Gervasio Bresciano =

Bresciano
- Comune
- Comune di San Gervasio Bresciano
- Location within Italy Location within Lombardy
- Coordinates: 45°18′N 10°9′E
- Country: Italy
- Region: Lombardy
- Province: Brescia (BS)
- Frazioni: Alfianello, Bassano Bresciano, Cigole, Manerbio, Milzano, Pontevico

Area
  - Total: 10 km^{2} (3.9 sq mi)

Population (2011)
  - Total: 1,308
  - Density: 130/km^{2} (340/sq mi)
- Time zone: UTC+1 (CET)
  - Summer (DST): UTC+2 (CEST)
- Postal code: 25020
- Dialing code: 030
- ISTAT code: 017172
- Website: Official website

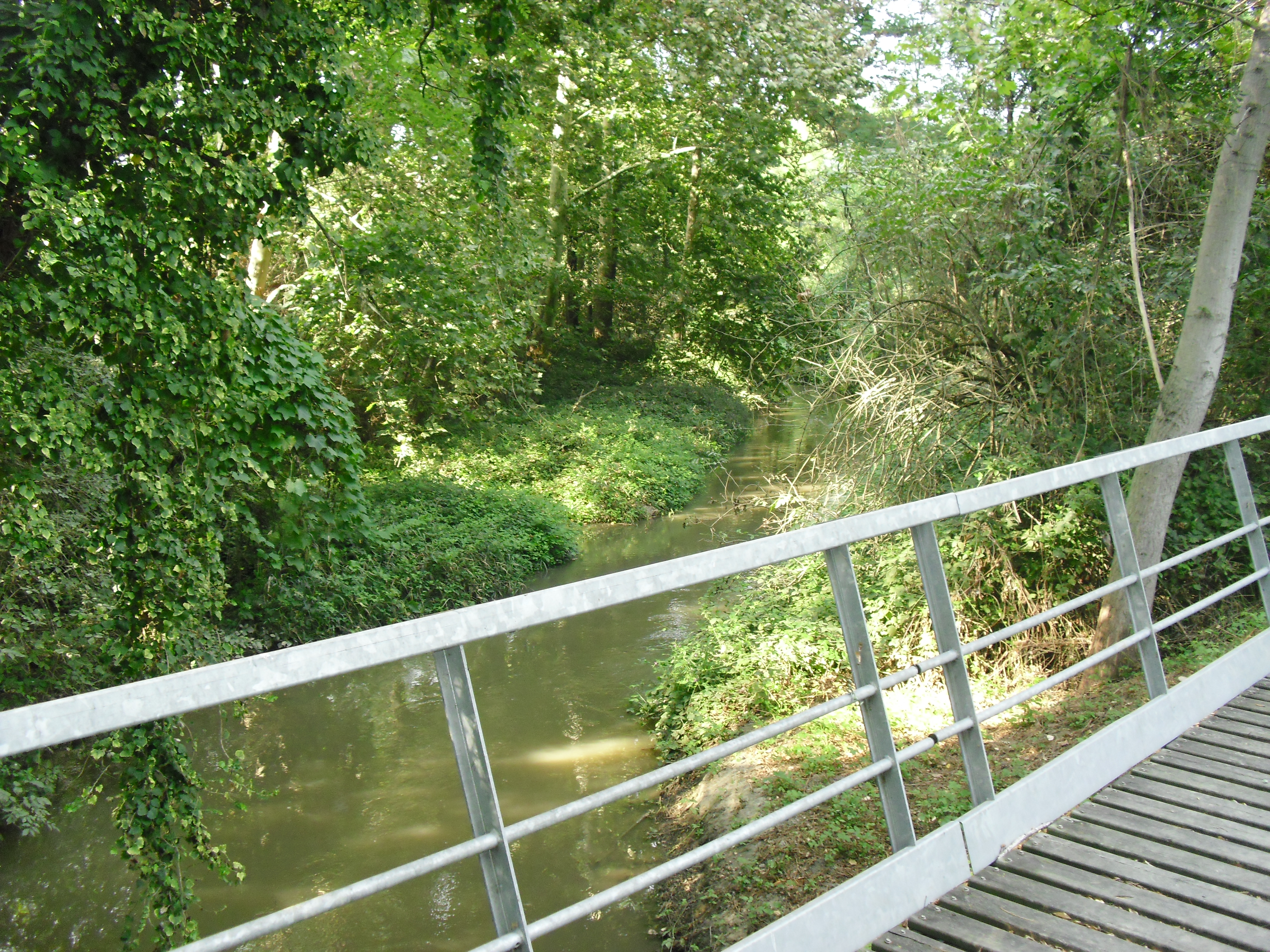
Lusignolo Wood

San Gervasio Bresciano (Brescian: San Gervàs) is a comune in the province of Brescia, in Lombardy. Points of interest are the "Bosco del Lusignolo", the aquatic park "Le Vele," and the water ski lake facing the aquatic park. San Gervasio Bresciano is also known for its festival, the "Sagra di San Gervasio e della bassa," which showcases traditional dishes and products of that region.
