= Barbariga =

Barbariga can refer to:

- Barbariga, Croatia, a village in Croatia
- Barbariga, Lombardy, a comune in the province of Brescia, Italy
