= Nuvolera =

Nuvolera Nigoléra
- Comune
- Comune di Nuvolera
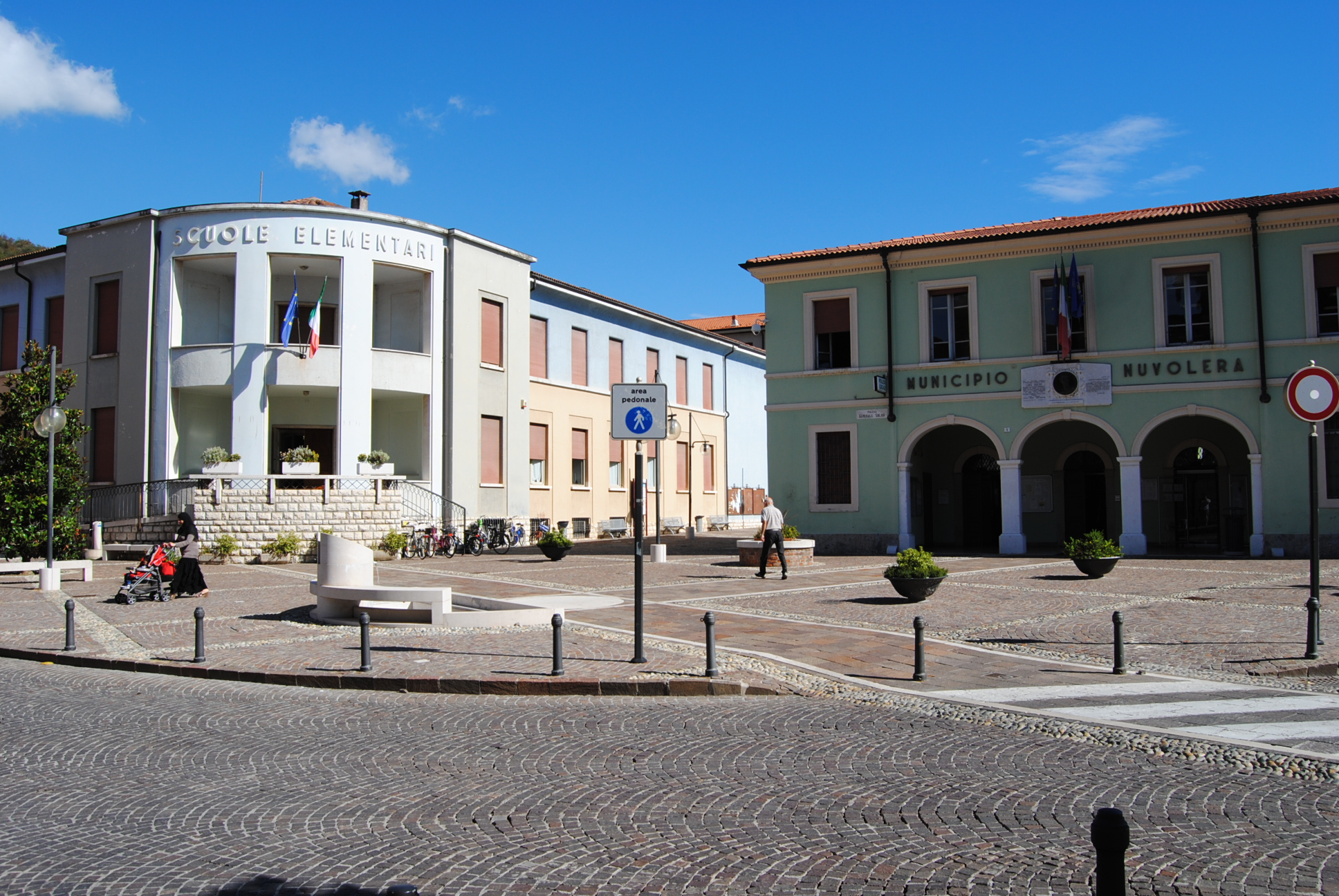
- Town hall

- Location within Italy Location within Lombardy
- Coordinates: 45°32′0″N 10°22′20″E
- Country: Italy
- Region: Lombardy
- Province: Brescia (BS)
- Frazioni: Bedizzole, Botticino, Mazzano, Nuvolento, Rezzato, Serle

Area
  - Total: 13 km^{2} (5.0 sq mi)

Population (2011)
  - Total: 4,693
  - Density: 360/km^{2} (930/sq mi)
- Time zone: UTC+1 (CET)
  - Summer (DST): UTC+2 (CEST)
- Postal code: 25080
- Dialing code: 030
- ISTAT code: 017120
- Website: Official website

Nuvolera (Brescian: Nigoléra) is a town and comune in the province of Brescia, in Lombardy. As of 2011 Nuvolera had a population of 4,693.
