= Milzano =

Milzano Melsà
- Comune
- Comune di Milzano
- Location within Italy Location within Lombardy
- Coordinates: 45°16′N 10°12′E
- Country: Italy
- Region: Lombardy
- Province: Brescia (BS)
- Frazioni: Alfianello, Cigole, Pavone del Mella, Pralboino, San Gervasio Bresciano, Seniga

Area
  - Total: 8 km^{2} (3.1 sq mi)

Population (2011)
  - Total: 1,840
  - Density: 230/km^{2} (600/sq mi)
- Time zone: UTC+1 (CET)
  - Summer (DST): UTC+2 (CEST)
- Postal code: 25020
- Dialing code: 030
- ISTAT code: 017108
- Patron saint: Saint Biagio
- Saint day: 3 February

Milzano (Brescian: Melsà) is a town and comune in the province of Brescia, in Lombardy. Surrounding comunes include Alfianello, Cigole, Pavone del Mella, Pralboino, San Gervasio Bresciano, Seniga.
