= Santa Maria in Campagna, Torre Pallavicina =

Church building in Torre Pallavicina, Italy

Santa Maria in Campagna is a renaissance-style, Roman Catholic parish church located in the town of Torre Pallavicina, province of Bergamo, region of Lombardy, Italy.

== History ==
A church was founded on the site in 1478, when Beatrice d’Este (illegitimate daughter of Niccolò III d'Este, Marquis of Ferrara), moved to that town with her daughter Elisabetta Caterina after the death of her husband, Tristano Sforza.

In the 1500s, the Servite order reconstructed the church, completed in 1590, as recalled by an inscription on the facade, stating: QUI CELSA PETIS INGREDERE TEMPLUS DOMINI VIRGINI DICATUM MDLXXXX (You who seek things from heaven, enter this temple of the Lord, dedicated to the Virgin in 1590).

A major remodeling took place in 1904, with addition of a cupola, frescoed by Giovanni Battista Jemol in 1910. A new bell-tower was added. In 1924, the ceiling was frescoed with Mysteries of the life of Jesus flanked by prophets and Saints, by Mario Albertella. The entrance niches in the facade has statues of Saints Paul and Peter. The central rose medallion with God the father, surmounted by a marble bas relief of the Annunciation by Ferraroni di Cremona. Restoration of the church began in 1990.
