= Pumenengo =

- Comune
- Comune di Pumenengo
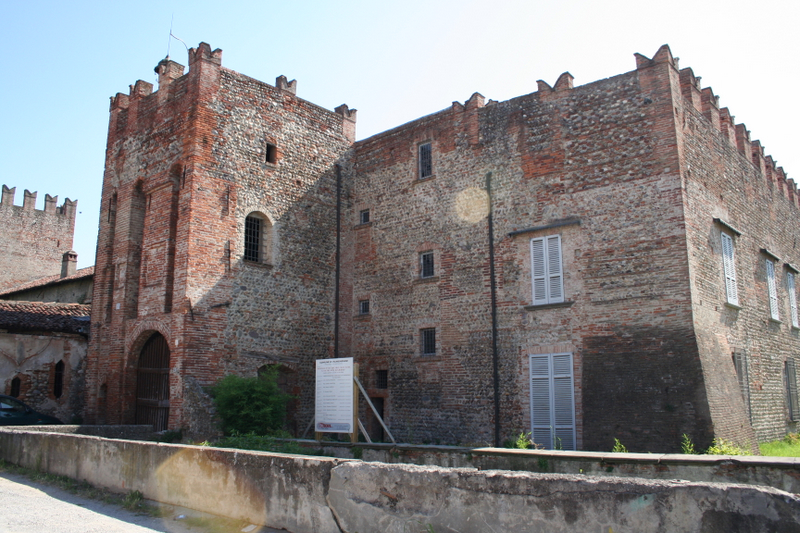
- Castle

- Location within Italy Location within Lombardy
- Coordinates: 45°28′N 9°52′E
- Country: Italy
- Region: Lombardy
- Province: Bergamo (BG)

Government
  - Mayor: Mauro Barelli

Area
  - Total: 10.12 km^{2} (3.91 sq mi)
- Elevation: 106 m (348 ft)

Population (30 April 2018)
  - Total: 1,708
  - Density: 168.8/km^{2} (437.1/sq mi)
- Demonym: Pumenenghesi
- Time zone: UTC+1 (CET)
  - Summer (DST): UTC+2 (CEST)
- Postal code: 24050
- Dialing code: 0363
- Website: Official website

Pumenengo (Bergamasque: Pümenèngh) is a comune (municipality) in the Province of Bergamo in the Italian region of Lombardy, located about 50 kilometres (31 mi) east of Milan and about 30 kilometres (19 mi) southeast of Bergamo.

Pumenengo borders the following municipalities: Calcio, Fontanella, Roccafranca, Rudiano, Torre Pallavicina.
