= Calvagese della Riviera =

Calvagese della Riviera Calvazés (Lombard)
- Comune
- Comune di Calvagese della Riviera
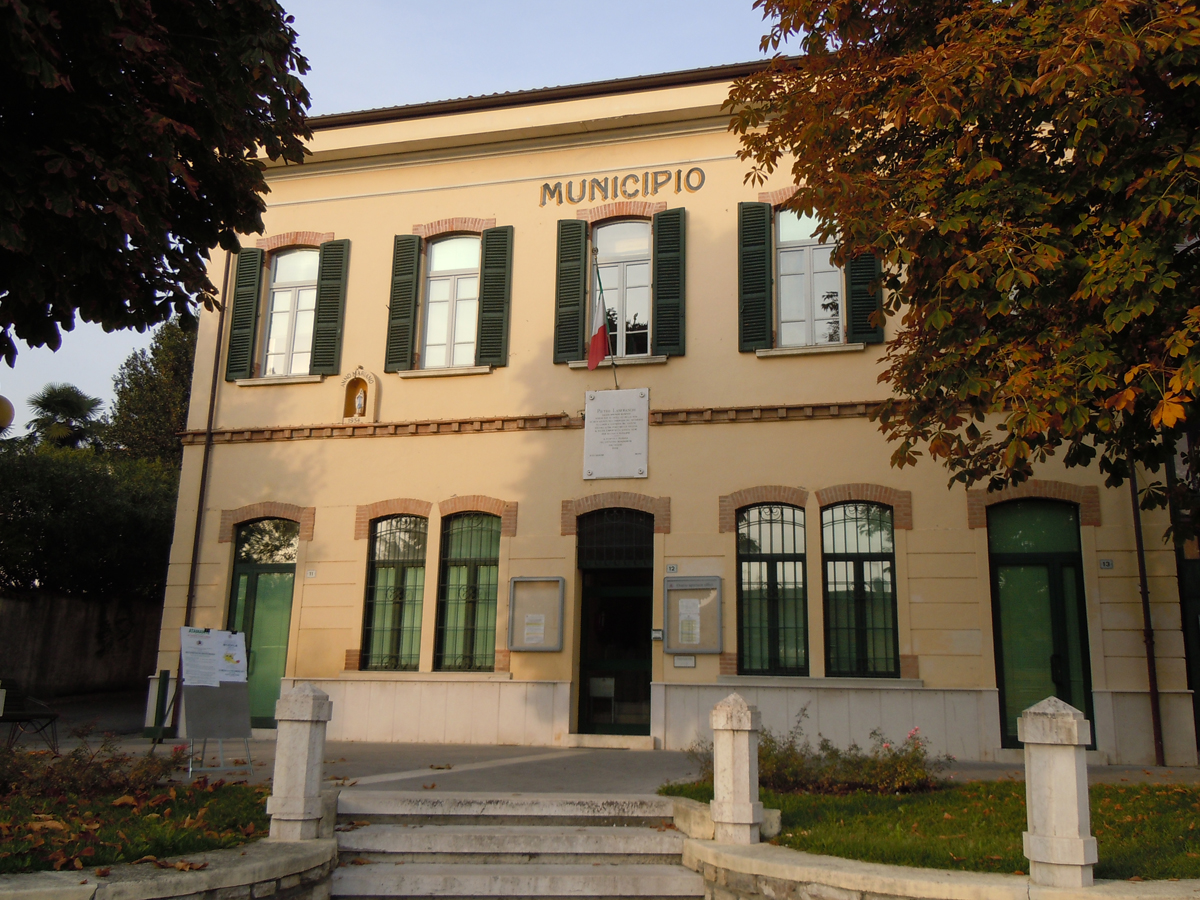
- Town hall

- Location within Italy Location within Lombardy
- Coordinates: 45°32′3.48″N 10°26′33.72″E
- Country: Italy
- Region: Lombardy
- Province: Brescia (BS)
- Frazioni: Carzago, Mocasina

Government
  - Mayor: Simonetta Gabana

Area
  - Total: 11.74 km^{2} (4.53 sq mi)
- Elevation: 225 m (738 ft)

Population (30 November 2017)
  - Total: 3,565
  - Density: 303.7/km^{2} (786.5/sq mi)
- Demonym: Calvagesini
- Time zone: UTC+1 (CET)
  - Summer (DST): UTC+2 (CEST)
- Postal code: 25080
- Dialing code: 030
- Patron saint: Saint Peter
- Saint day: 22 February
- Website: Official website

Calvagese della Riviera (Lombard: Calvages, Brescian: Calvazés) is one of the 206 municipalities of the Province of Brescia, in the northern Italian region of Lombardy. It is some 10 kilometres (6 mi) west of Lake Garda. Its population of 3,522 is divided between the centres of Calvagese itself, Carzago, and Mocasina. Other localities include Belvedere, Ponte Clisi (where there is a bridge across the river Chiese), and Terzago.

The communes which border on Calvagese della Riviera are Polpenazze del Garda, Prevalle, Bedizzole, Padenghe sul Garda, Lonato, Soiano del Lago, and Muscoline.

== Main sights ==
The most important building is the church of San Pietro di Antiochia, which has frescoes dating from the 15th and 16th centuries, and paintings by Girolamo Romanino (a Madonna and Child), Zenon Veronese (Deposition) and other artists of the Venetian school. The church was partially restored during the first half of the 18th century.

Sights in Carzago include the parish church of San Lorenzo, which holds paintings by Gallina and Cossali, and the remains of a medieval castle whose four towers have remained visible to this day.

== Sources ==
- Comune di Calvagese della Riviera (2006-11-29), Statuto (PDF).
