= Fontanella, Lombardy =

Fontanella
- Comune
- Comune di Fontanella
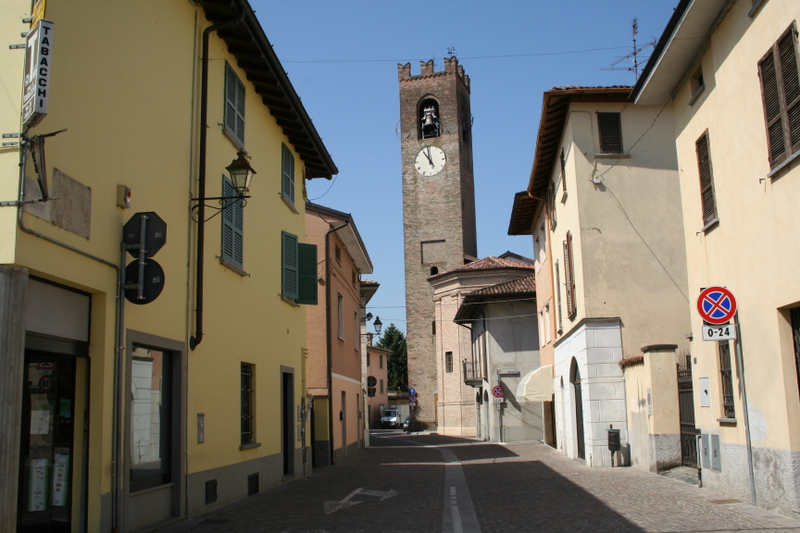
- Tower

- Location within Italy Location within Lombardy
- Coordinates: 45°28′N 9°48′E
- Country: Italy
- Region: Lombardy
- Province: Province of Bergamo (BG)

Area
  - Total: 17.9 km^{2} (6.9 sq mi)
- Elevation: 105 m (344 ft)

Population (Dec. 2004)
  - Total: 3,773
  - Density: 211/km^{2} (546/sq mi)
- Demonym: Fontanellesi
- Time zone: UTC+1 (CET)
  - Summer (DST): UTC+2 (CEST)
- Postal code: 24056
- Dialing code: 0363

Fontanella (Bergamasque: Funtanèla) is a comune (municipality) in the Province of Bergamo in the Italian region of Lombardy, located about 50 kilometres (31 mi) east of Milan and about 30 kilometres (19 mi) southeast of Bergamo. As of 31 December 2004, it had a population of 3,773 and an area of 17.9 square kilometres (6.9 mi^{2}).

Fontanella borders the following municipalities: Antegnate, Barbata, Calcio, Casaletto di Sopra, Pumenengo, Soncino, Torre Pallavicina.

== Population ==
Historical population

Year	Pop.	±%
1861	2,465	—
1871	2,612	+6.0%
1881	2,844	+8.9%
1901	3,222	+13.3%
1911	3,712	+15.2%

Year	Pop.	±%
1921	3,884	+4.6%
1931	4,001	+3.0%
1936	3,876	−3.1%
1951	4,057	+4.7%
1961	3,329	−17.9%

Year	Pop.	±%
1971	3,050	−8.4%
1981	3,367	+10.4%
1991	3,459	+2.7%
2001	3,628	+4.9%

Source: Data from ISTAT
