= Muscoline =

Muscoline Musculine
- Comune
- Comune di Muscoline
- Location within Italy Location within Lombardy
- Coordinates: 45°34′N 10°28′E
- Country: Italy
- Region: Lombardy
- Province: Brescia (BS)
- Frazioni: Calvagese della Riviera, Gavardo, Polpenazze del Garda, Prevalle, Puegnago sul Garda

Area
  - Total: 10 km^{2} (3.9 sq mi)
- Elevation: 272 m (892 ft)

Population (2000)
  - Total: 2,654
  - Density: 270/km^{2} (690/sq mi)
- Demonym: Muscolinesi
- Time zone: UTC+1 (CET)
  - Summer (DST): UTC+2 (CEST)
- Postal code: 25080
- Dialing code: 0365
- ISTAT code: 017116
- Patron saint: Santa Maria
- Saint day: 15 August

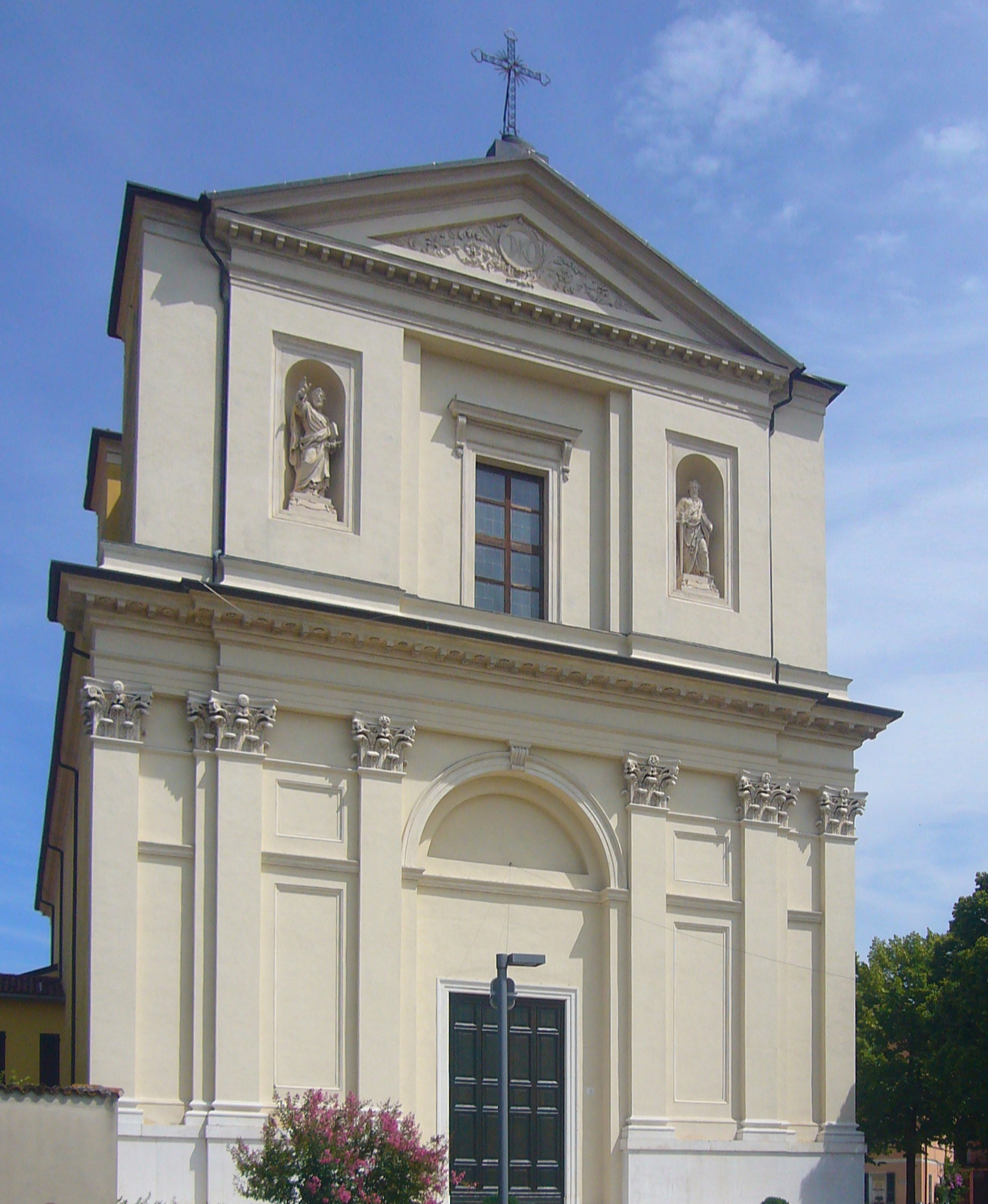
The Church of Santa Maria Assunta in Muscoline

Muscoline (Brescian: Musculine) is a town and comune in the province of Brescia, in Lombardy, Italy.
