= Puegnago del Garda =

Puegnago del Garda Puegnàch
- Comune
- Comune di Puegnago del Garda
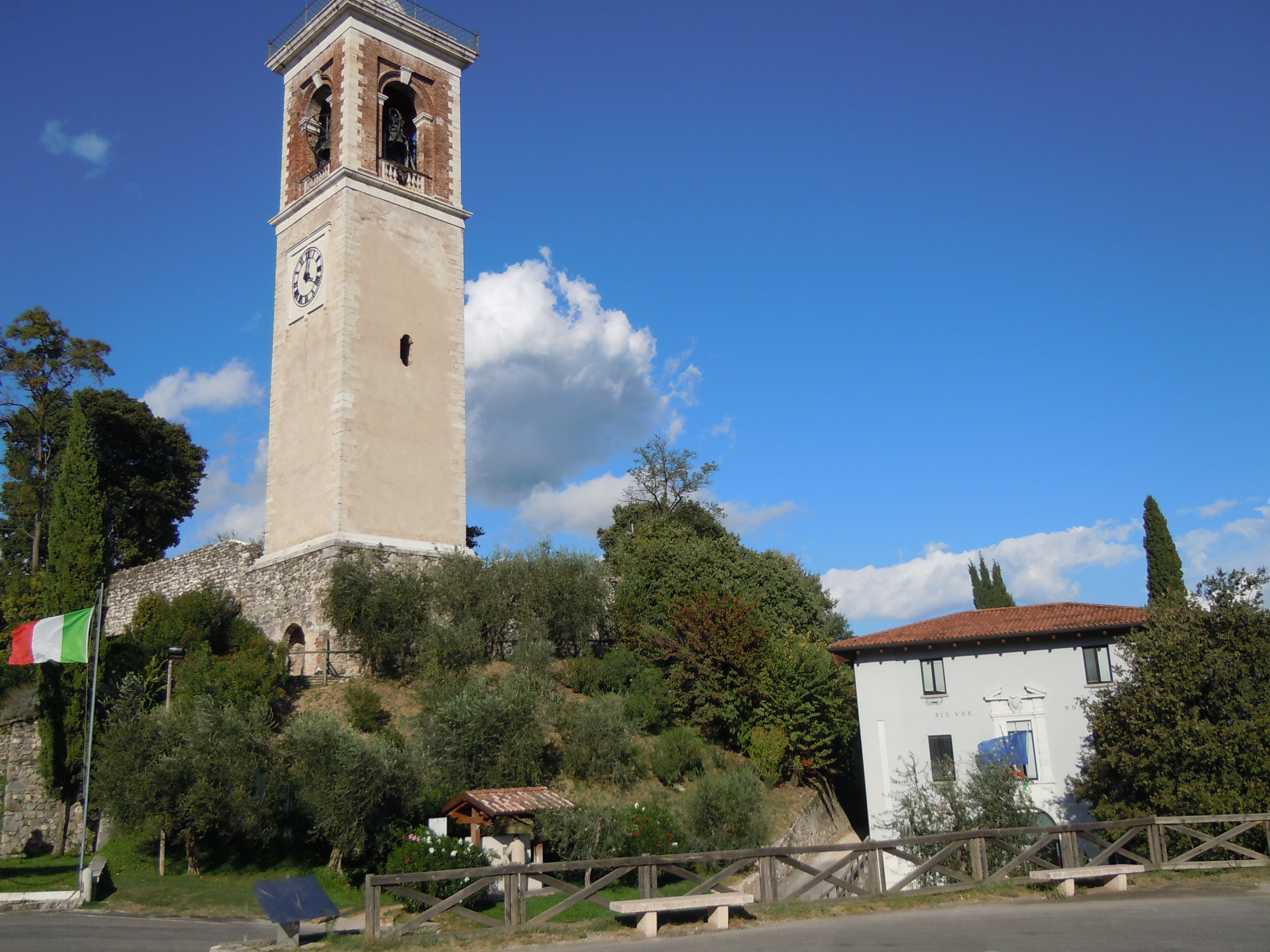

- Location within Italy Location within Lombardy
- Coordinates: 45°34′0″N 10°30′36″E
- Country: Italy
- Region: Lombardy
- Province: Brescia (BS)
- Frazioni: Castello (Town hall), Monteacuto, Mura, Palude, Raffa, San Quirico

Government
  - Mayor: Adelio Zeni (FI)

Area
  - Total: 10 km^{2} (3.9 sq mi)
- Elevation: 224 m (735 ft)

Population (31 December 2011)
  - Total: 3,286
  - Density: 330/km^{2} (850/sq mi)
- Time zone: UTC+1 (CET)
  - Summer (DST): UTC+2 (CEST)
- Postal code: 25080
- Dialing code: 0365
- ISTAT code: 017158
- Patron saint: St. Michael
- Saint day: September 29
- Website: Official website

Puegnago del Garda (Gardesano: Puegnàch) is a comune in the province of Brescia, in Lombardy.

It is bounded by the comunes of San Felice del Benaco, Manerba del Garda, Muscoline, Polpenazze del Garda and Salò.

== History ==
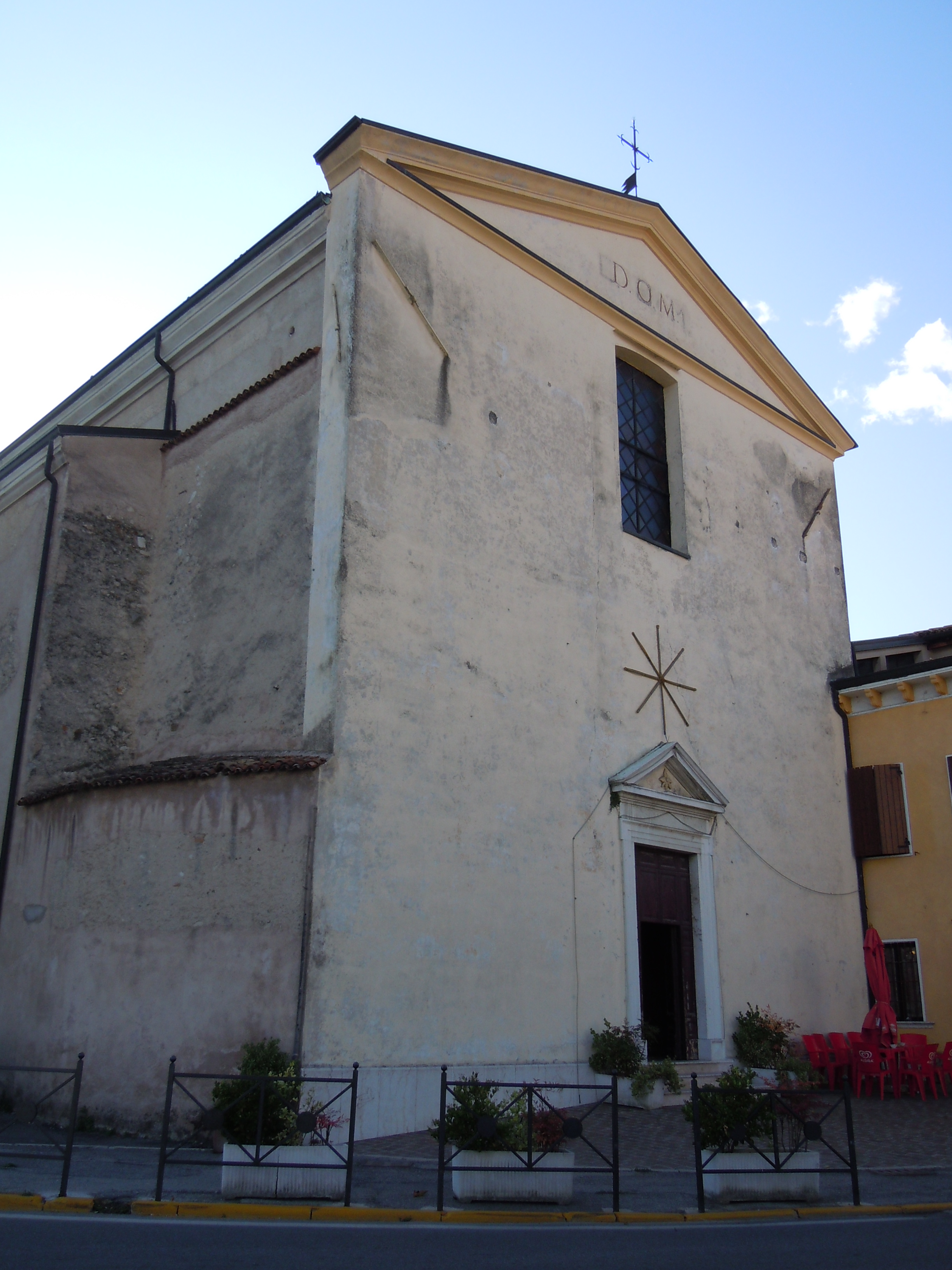
Saint Michael Church.

Thanks to the finding of the remains of lake-dwelling villages in the small lakes of Sovenigo, it has been possible to ascertain that the area was already inhabited during the prehistoric era. When visiting Monte Boccale it is possible to encounter plaques belonging to the Romanesque period, the most spectacular being walled into the door of the parish church in San Michele.

The town experienced Lombard domination, as is demonstrated by documents listing the property of some Lombards; in the 14th century it was subjected to the dominion of Mastino della Scala and in the 15th century to domination from Venice. During the period under the Venetian Republic Puegnago became part of the Valtenesi area. The plague of 1630 did not spare the town, bringing great suffering and mourning.

Puegnago was subjected to the raids of bandits in the 17th century, among whom there was the terrible Dominisette, who subjected the population to appalling outrages. With the arrival of the war of Spanish succession, French and Spanish troops plundered Puegnago of the money of the Company of the Sacred Body of Christ and of many sacred works contained in the town. The population was proud of the assistance given to neighbouring towns after the battle of San Martino, when they aided the numerous injured soldiers.

From 1818 to 1825 Puegnago, Soiano and San Felice were gathered together, whereas only in 1928 was Puegnago joined to Raffa. The origin of the unusual name is thought to date back to the Roman era, from the Roman "Popinius" which became "Popiniacus" following a form of Romanisation.
