= Torre Pallavicina =

- Comune
- Comune di Torre Pallavicina
- Barbó Palace

- Location within Italy Location within Lombardy
- Coordinates: 45°27′N 9°52′E
- Country: Italy
- Region: Lombardy
- Province: Province of Bergamo (BG)
- Frazioni: Villanuova (municipal seat), Torre, S.Maria in Campagna

Government
  - Mayor: Antonio Marchetti

Area
  - Total: 10.62 km^{2} (4.10 sq mi)
- Elevation: 95 m (312 ft)

Population (31 December 2018)
  - Total: 1,138
  - Density: 107.2/km^{2} (277.5/sq mi)
- Demonym: Torrepallavicinesi
- Time zone: UTC+1 (CET)
  - Summer (DST): UTC+2 (CEST)
- Postal code: 24050
- Dialing code: 0363
- Website: Official website

Torre Pallavicina (Bergamasque: Tór Palaisina) is a comune (municipality) in the Province of Bergamo in the Italian region of Lombardy, located about 50 kilometres (31 mi) east of Milan and about 30 kilometres (19 mi) southeast of Bergamo.

Torre Pallavicina borders the following municipalities: Fontanella, Orzinuovi, Pumenengo, Roccafranca, Soncino.
