= Prevalle =

Prevalle Guiù
- Comune
- Comune di Prevalle
- Coat of arms

- Location within Italy Location within Lombardy
- Coordinates: 45°33′N 10°25′E
- Country: Italy
- Region: Lombardy
- Province: Brescia (BS)
- Frazioni: Aquatica, Baderniga, Bassina, Borgolungo, Celle, Masserina, Mosina, Notica

Area
  - Total: 9.86 km^{2} (3.81 sq mi)
- Elevation: 180 m (590 ft)

Population (31 December 2011)
  - Total: 7,020
  - Density: 712/km^{2} (1,840/sq mi)
- Demonym: Prevallesi
- Time zone: UTC+1 (CET)
  - Summer (DST): UTC+2 (CEST)
- Postal code: 25080
- Dialing code: 030
- ISTAT code: 017155
- Website: Official website

Prevalle (Brescian: Guiù) is a comune in the province of Brescia, in Lombardy. Neighbouring communes are Nuvolento, Paitone, Gavardo, Calvagese della Riviera, Muscoline and Bedizzole.
