= Nuvolento =

Nuvolento Nigolent
- Comune
- Comune di Nuvolento
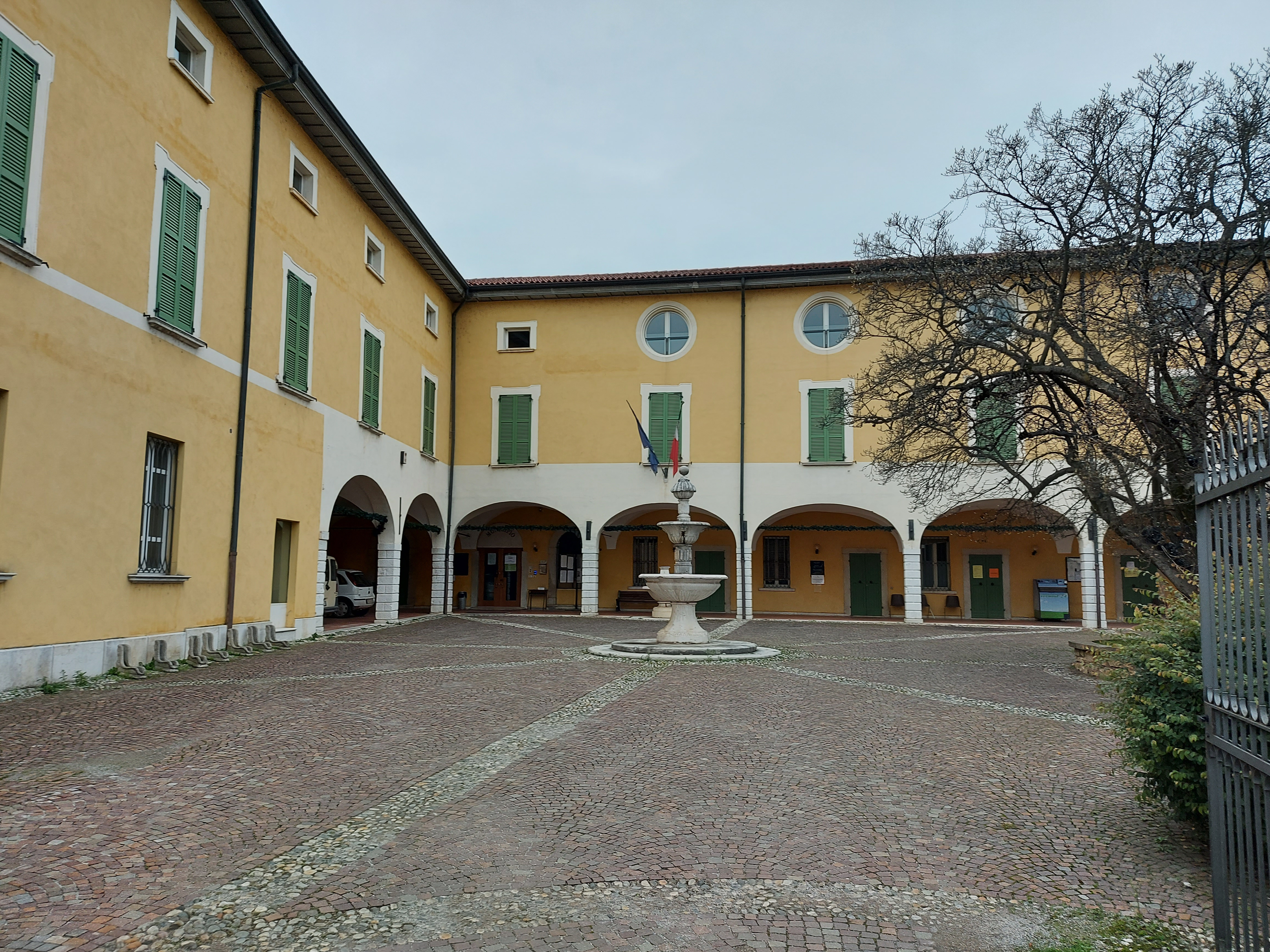
- Town hall

- Location within Italy Location within Lombardy
- Coordinates: 45°32′40″N 10°23′06″E
- Country: Italy
- Region: Lombardy
- Province: Brescia (BS)
- Frazioni: Bedizzole, Nuvolera, Paitone, Prevalle, Serle

Government
  - Mayor: Giovanni Santini

Area
  - Total: 7 km^{2} (2.7 sq mi)
- Elevation: 176 m (577 ft)

Population (2011)
  - Total: 4,080
  - Density: 580/km^{2} (1,500/sq mi)
- Demonym: Nuvolentesi
- Time zone: UTC+1 (CET)
  - Summer (DST): UTC+2 (CEST)
- Postal code: 25080
- Dialing code: 030
- ISTAT code: 017119
- Patron saint: Santa Maria della Neve
- Saint day: 5 August
- Website: Official website

Nuvolento (Brescian: Nigolent) is a town and comune in the province of Brescia, in Lombardy. Neighbouring comuni are Paitone, Nuvolera, Prevalle, Serle and Bedizzole. It is within the agricultural area of the province of Brescia, west of the river Chiese and Lake Garda.
