= Botticino =

Botticino Butizì
- Comune
- Comune di Botticino
- Location within Italy Location within Lombardy
- Coordinates: 45°32′N 10°14′E
- Country: Italy
- Region: Lombardy
- Province: Brescia (BS)
- Frazioni: Botticino Mattina, Botticino Sera, San Gallo

Government
  - Mayor: Paolo Apostoli

Area
  - Total: 18.48 km^{2} (7.14 sq mi)
- Elevation: 153 m (502 ft)

Population (30-11-2016)
  - Total: 10,909
  - Density: 590.3/km^{2} (1,529/sq mi)
- Demonym: Botticinesi
- Time zone: UTC+1 (CET)
  - Summer (DST): UTC+2 (CEST)
- Postal code: 25080 - 25082
- Dialing code: 030

Botticino (Brescian: Butisì) is a town and comune (commune or municipality) in the province of Brescia, in Lombardy, Italy. The comune was created in 1928 by the union of the former comuni of Botticino Mattina and Botticino Sera, which today, together with San Gallo, are classified as the municipality's three frazioni.

Neighbouring communes are Brescia, Nave, Nuvolera, Rezzato and Serle. It lies directly northeast of Brescia. It gave its name to marmo botticino, a valuable sedimentary limestone. Botticino is also a DOC of Lombardian wine.

== Notable people ==
- Pio Chiaruttini (1901–1985), businessman and inventor
- Benedetto Castelli (1578–1643), mathematician
- Paolo Bolpagni (b. 1981), art historian, critic, and creator
- Giovanni Paolo Maggini (c. 1580 – c. 1630), violin and cello maker
