= Rudiano =

Rudiano Rudià
- Comune
- Comune di Rudiano
- Location within Italy Location within Lombardy
- Coordinates: 45°29′N 9°53′E
- Country: Italy
- Region: Lombardy
- Province: Brescia (BS)
- Frazioni: Calcio (BG), Chiari, Pumenengo (BG), Roccafranca, Urago d'Oglio

Area
  - Total: 9 km^{2} (3.5 sq mi)
- Elevation: 117 m (384 ft)

Population (2011)
  - Total: 5,917
  - Density: 660/km^{2} (1,700/sq mi)
- Demonym: Rudianesi
- Time zone: UTC+1 (CET)
  - Summer (DST): UTC+2 (CEST)
- Postal code: 25030
- Dialing code: 030
- ISTAT code: 017167
- Website: Official website

Rudiano (Brescian: Rudià) is a comune in the province of Brescia, in Lombardy.
