= Urago d'Oglio =

Urago d'Oglio Öràc d'Òi (Lombard)
- Comune
- Comune di Urago d'Oglio
- Location within Italy Location within Lombardy
- Coordinates: 45°31′N 9°52′E
- Country: Italy
- Region: Lombardy
- Province: Brescia (BS)
- Frazioni: Calcio (BG), Chiari, Cividate al Piano (BG), Pontoglio, Rudiano

Area
  - Total: 10 km^{2} (3.9 sq mi)

Population (2018-01-01)
  - Total: 3,356
  - Density: 340/km^{2} (870/sq mi)
- Demonym: Uraghesi
- Time zone: UTC+1 (CET)
  - Summer (DST): UTC+2 (CEST)
- Postal code: 25030
- Dialing code: 030
- ISTAT code: 017192
- Patron saint: Saint Lorenzo
- Saint day: 10 August
- Website: Official website

Urago d'Oglio (Brescian: Öràc d'Òi) is a comune in the province of Brescia, in Lombardy. It is situated on the left bank of the river Oglio, opposite the comune of Calcio. Its coat of arms shows on the left side a black half eagle on silver, and on the right side a half castle.
