= Cevo =

Cevo Séf
- Comune
- Comune di Cevo
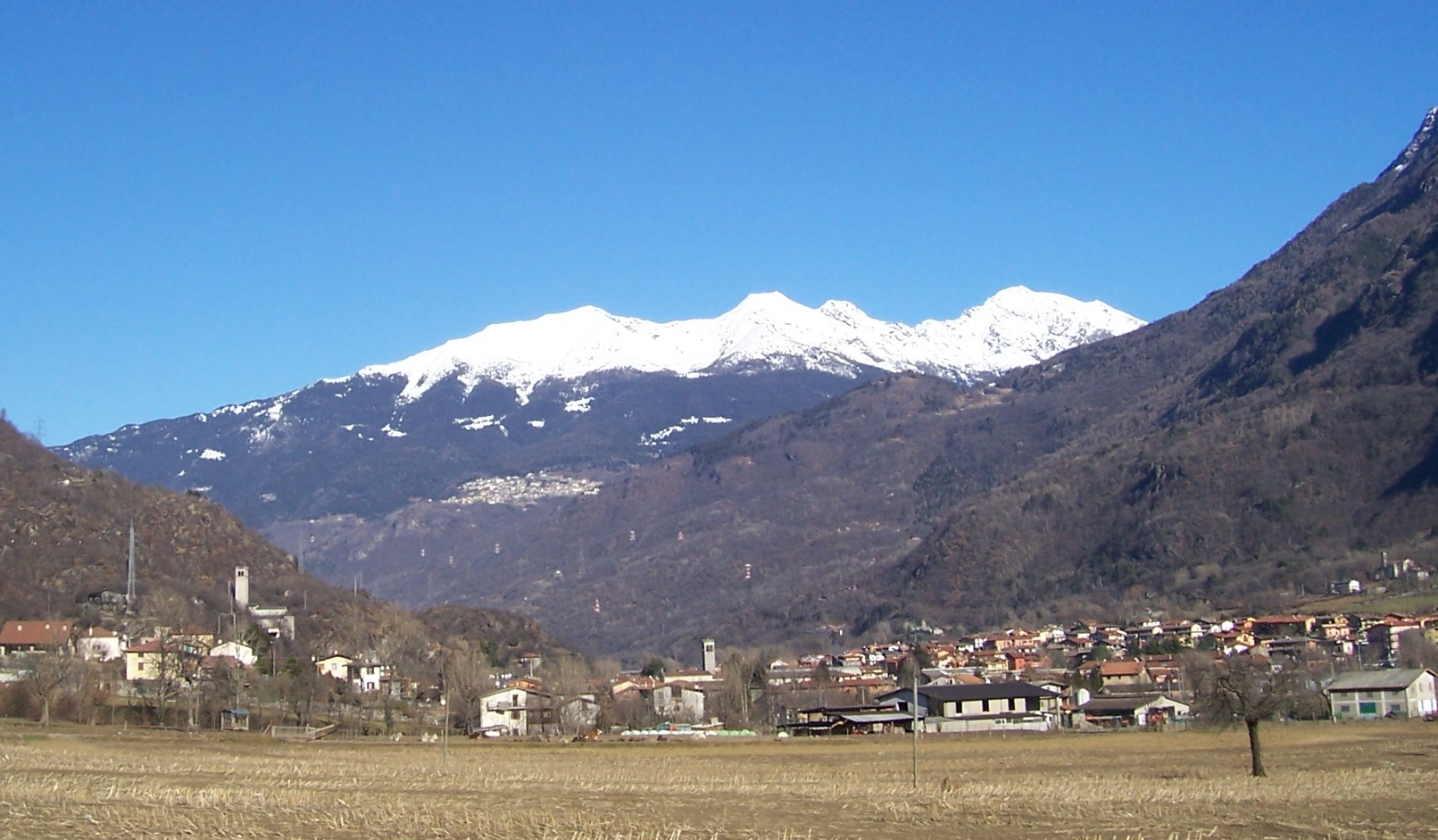

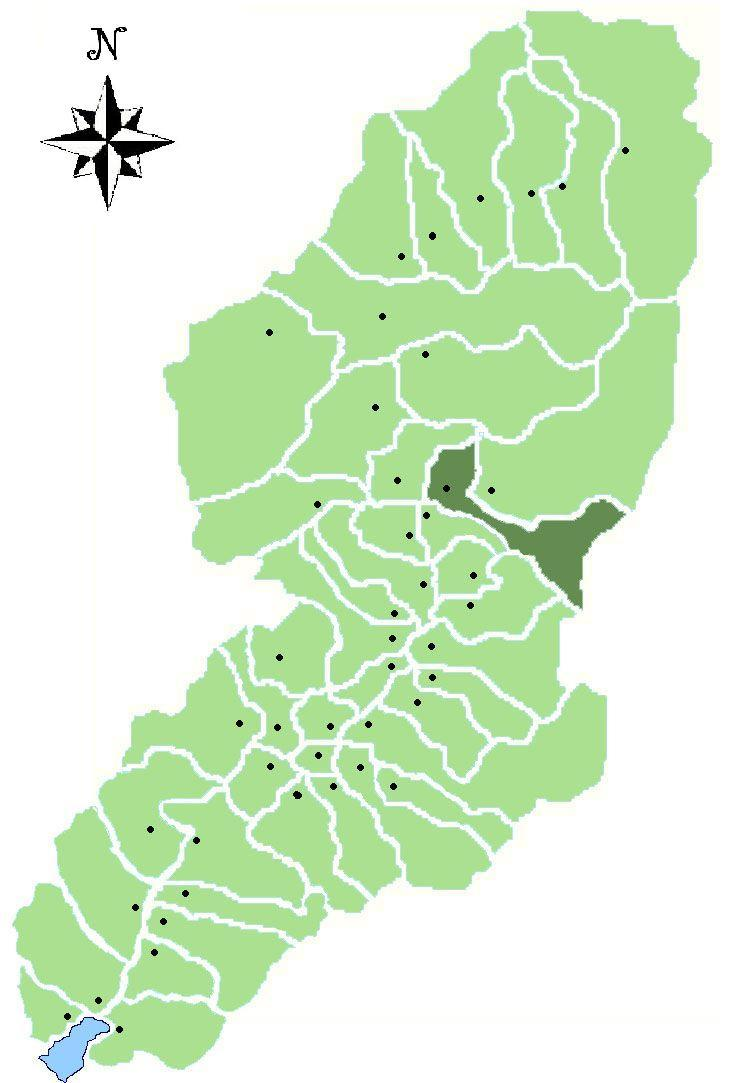
- Comune of Cevo in Val Camonica

- Location within Italy Location within Lombardy
- Coordinates: 46°4′56″N 10°22′10″E
- Country: Italy
- Region: Lombardy
- Province: Brescia (BS)
- Frazioni: Fresine, Andrista, Isola

Government
  - Mayor: Simone Bresadola

Area
  - Total: 35.47 km^{2} (13.70 sq mi)
- Elevation: 1,100 m (3,600 ft)

Population (14 April 2025)
  - Total: 787
  - Density: 22.2/km^{2} (57.5/sq mi)
- Demonym: Cevesi
- Time zone: UTC+1 (CET)
  - Summer (DST): UTC+2 (CEST)
- Postal code: 25040
- Dialing code: 0364
- Patron saint: Saint Vigilius of Trento
- Saint day: 26 June
- Website: Official website

Cevo (Camunian: Séf) is an Italian comune in Val Camonica, province of Brescia, Lombardy, northern Italy.

Neighbouring communes are Saviore dell'Adamello and Berzo Demo. It is located near Valle Camonica near the slopes of Adamello.

== History ==
On April 22, 1644, most of the town of Cevo was burned down by a fire started by lightning. On July 3, 1944, most of the houses in the town were either damaged, destroyed, or looted by the combined Wehrmacht and Italian Fascist forces, in retaliation for activities by the partisans. Six people were killed and two-thirds of the 1,200 residents were left homeless.

== Main sights ==
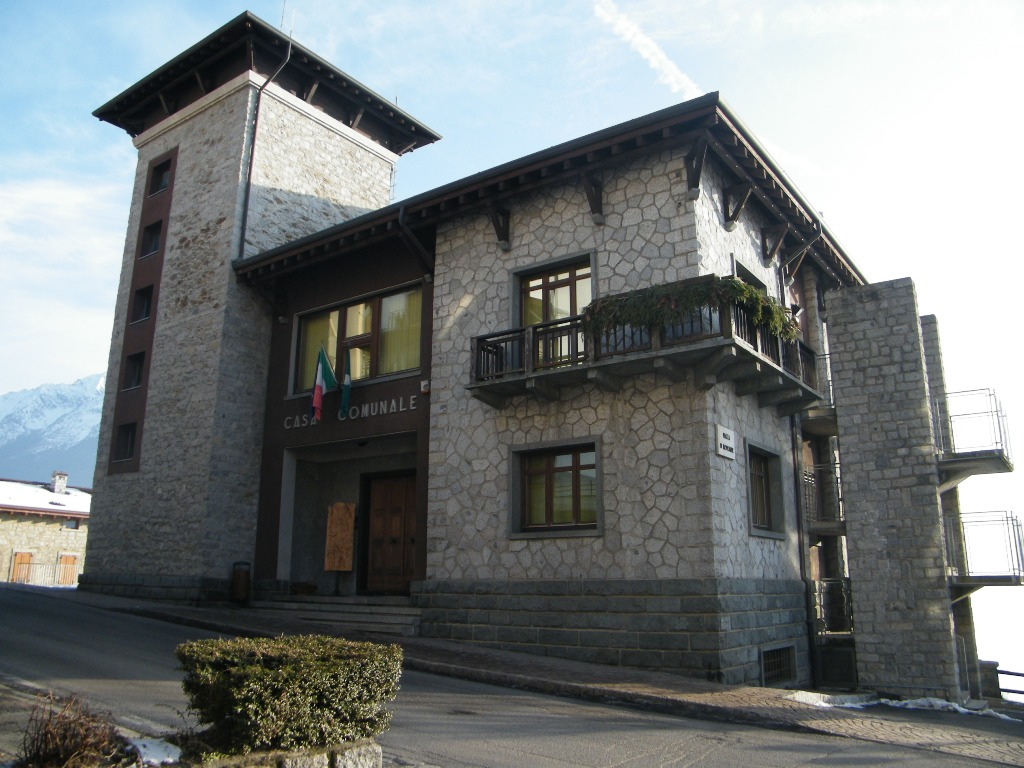
The Town Hall.

Churches Cevo are:

- Church of St. Sixtus of the sixteenth century from earlier Romanesque building, surrounded by a small cemetery.
- Parish of San Vigilio of the sixteenth century
- Church of Sant 'Antonio Abate
- La Croce del Papa (dedicated to Pope John Paul II). A 30m high cross that curves out over the valley below. The current structure replaces the wooden cross that broke in 2014, killing a 21-year-old man. The cross is also the terminus of a walking trail/pilgrimage that starts in the nearby town of Demo, passes through Andrista before climbing the hill to Cevo.

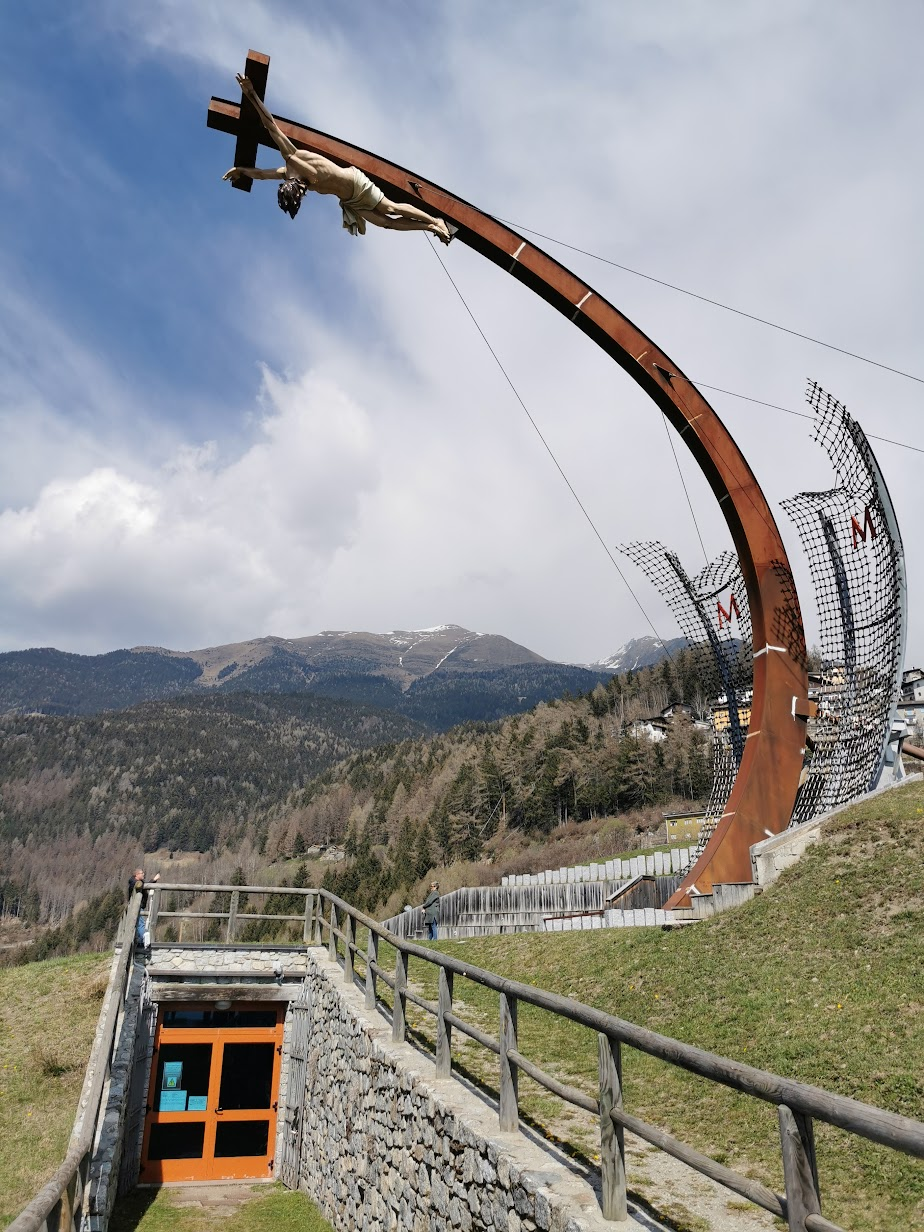
La Croce del Papa

== Culture ==
The scütüm are in camunian dialect nicknames, sometimes personal, elsewhere showing the characteristic features of a community. The one which characterize the people of Cevo is Barlócc.

== Twin towns ==
Cevo is twinned with:

- Trezzo sull'Adda, Italy
