= Paolo Bolpagni =

Italian art historian

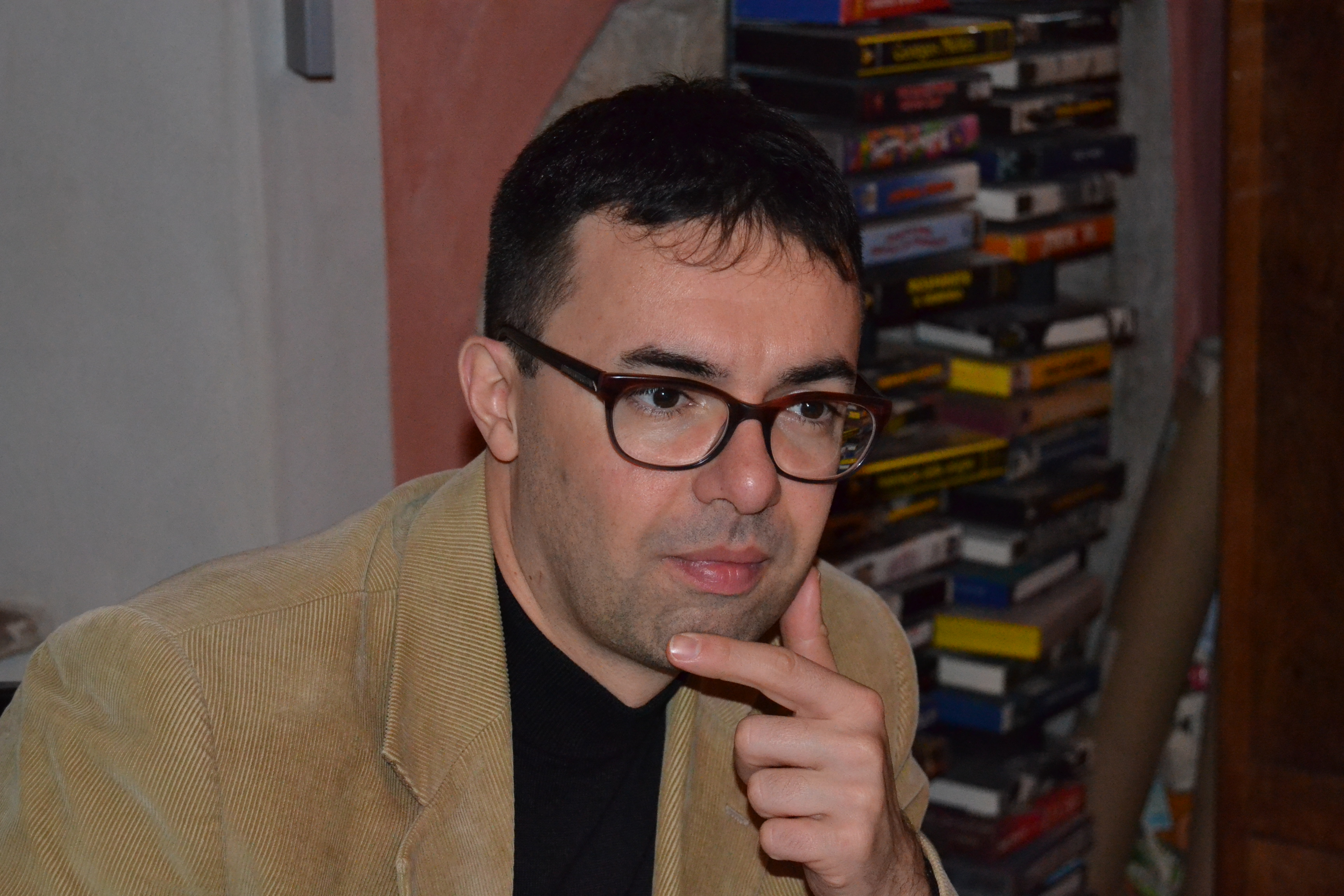
- Born: Brescia, Lombardy
- Education: Università Cattolica del Sacro Cuore
- Awards: Premio Sulmona, 2013

Paolo Bolpagni (born in Brescia) is an Italian art historian, critic and curator.

== Life ==
Bolpagni was born in Brescia, in Lombardy in northern Italy. He graduated in letters from the Università Cattolica del Sacro Cuore in Brescia, and then completed a doctorate in history of art at the same university in Milan. Since 2010 he has taught at the Brescia campus of the university. He also teaches at the Università degli Studi eCampus.

From 2008 to 2011, and again from 2013, he was director of the Collezione Paolo VI - arte contemporanea in Concesio, in the province of Brescia, and in 2016 became director of the Fondazione Centro Studi sull'Arte Licia e Carlo Ludovico Ragghianti in Lucca, in Tuscany. He won the Premio Sulmona for history of art in 2013; he is the youngest person to have won the prize.

== Work ==
Bolpagni has written on the twentieth-century artist Mario Ballocco, founder of the Gruppo Origine, and has also published work on the interaction between music and the visual arts. In 2011–2012, he created a channel on YouTube where he presented short videos on the history of contemporary art.

== Publications ==
- L'arte nell'"Avanti della Domenica" 1903-1907, Mazzotta, Milan, 2008.
- Mario Ballocco, Silvana Editoriale, Cinisello Balsamo, 2009.
- Visioni musicali. Rapporti tra musica e arti visive nel Novecento (with Francesco Tedeschi), Vita e Pensiero, Milan, 2009.
- Ritmi visivi. Luigi Veronesi nell'astrattismo europeo, Edizioni Fondazione Ragghianti Studi sull'Arte, Lucca, 2011.
- Arte, socialità, politica. Articoli dell'"Avanti della Domenica" 1903-1907, Fondazione Anna Kuliscioff - EDIFIS, Milan, 2011.
- Fortuny e Wagner. Il wagnerismo nelle arti visive in Italia, Fondazione Musei Civici di Venezia - Skira, Venice-Milan, 2012.
- All'Origine della forma. Mario Ballocco - Alberto Burri - Giuseppe Capogrossi - Ettore Colla, Allemandi, Turin-Milan, 2013.
- Brescia. Breathtaking beauty, La Compagnia della Stampa, Brescia, 2015.
- Sguardi paralleli: Ballocco / Morellet, Edizioni Fondazione Ragghianti Studi sull'Arte, Lucca, 2016.
