= Saviore dell'Adamello =

- Comune
- Comune di Saviore dell'Adamello
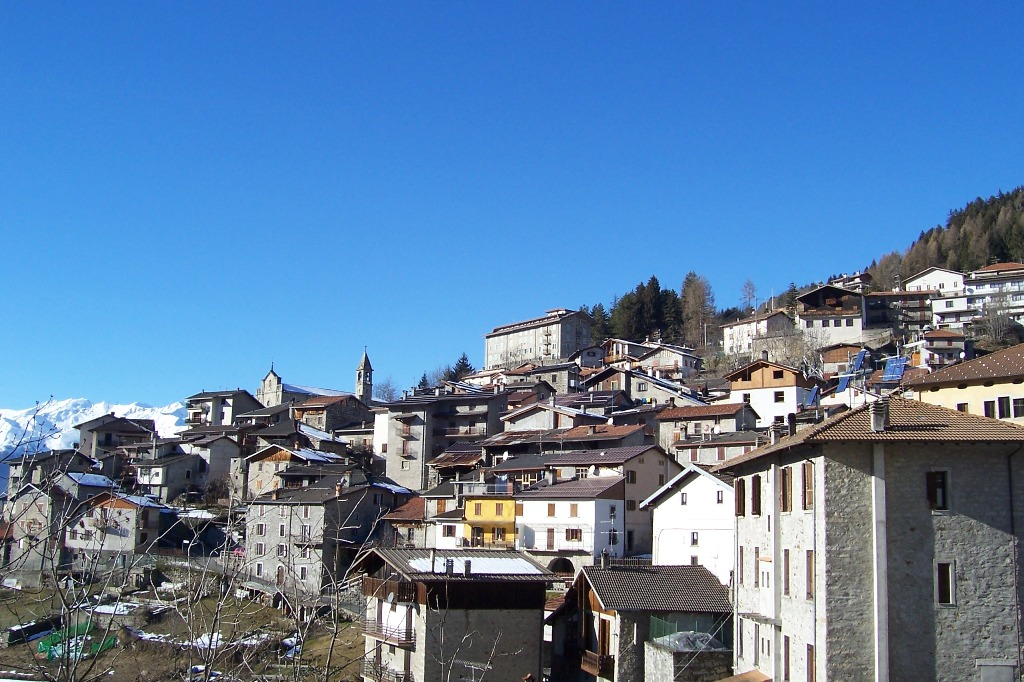

- Coat of arms

- Location within Italy Location within Lombardy
- Coordinates: 46°04′53″N 10°24′2″E
- Country: Italy
- Region: Lombardy
- Province: Brescia (BS)
- Frazioni: Ponte, Valle

Government
  - Mayor: Alberto Tosa

Area
  - Total: 82 km^{2} (32 sq mi)
- Elevation: 1,100 m (3,600 ft)

Population (31 December 2011)
  - Total: 998
  - Density: 12/km^{2} (32/sq mi)
- Demonym: Savioresi
- Time zone: UTC+1 (CET)
  - Summer (DST): UTC+2 (CEST)
- Postal code: 25050
- Dialing code: 0364
- Patron saint: Santa Maria Assunta
- Saint day: 15 August
- Website: Official website

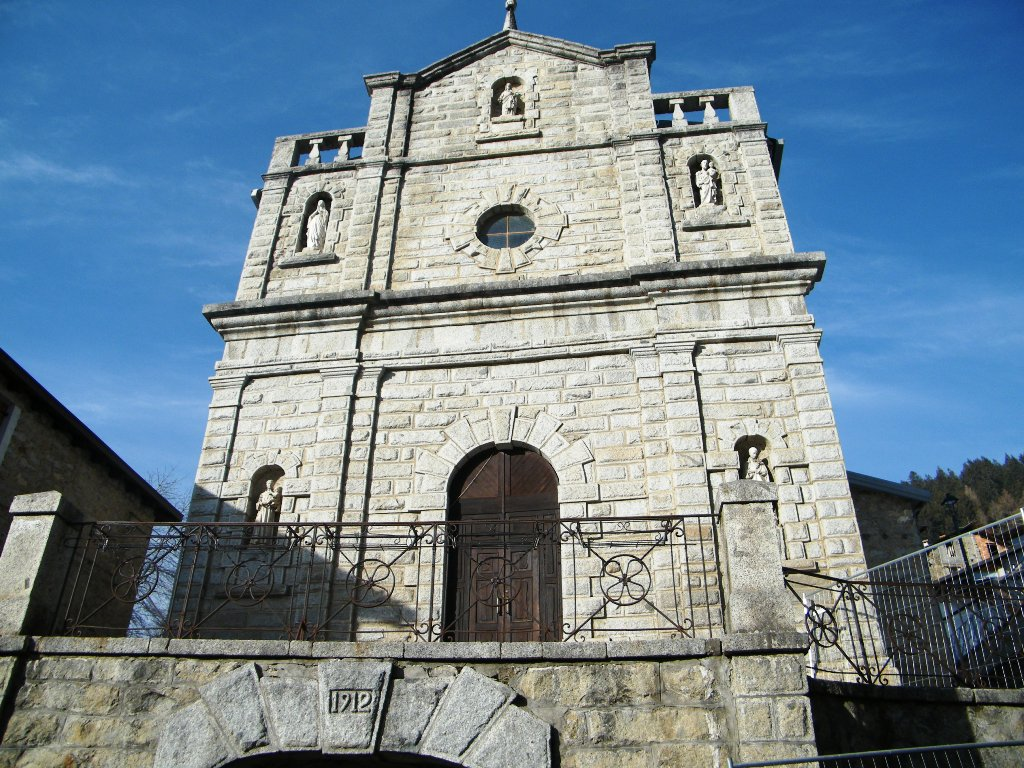
Church of Sant'Antonio

Saviore dell'Adamello (Camunian: Saviúr) is a comune in the province of Brescia, in Lombardy, Italy.

It is bounded by the commune of Cevo. It is located in the Val Camonica region, southwest of Mount Adamello.
