= Pralboino =

- Comune
- Comune di Pralboino
- Location within Italy Location within Lombardy
- Coordinates: 45°16′06″N 10°13′06″E
- Country: Italy
- Region: Lombardy
- Province: Brescia (BS)
- Frazioni: Santa Maria degli Angeli

Area
  - Total: 17 km^{2} (6.6 sq mi)
- Elevation: 47 m (154 ft)

Population (2011)
  - Total: 2,975
  - Density: 180/km^{2} (450/sq mi)
- Demonym: Pralboinesi
- Time zone: UTC+1 (CET)
  - Summer (DST): UTC+2 (CEST)
- Postal code: 25020
- Dialing code: 030
- ISTAT code: 017152
- Patron saint: Saint Flaviano Martire
- Saint day: Second Sunday in October
- Website: Official website

Pralboino (Brescian: Pralbuì) is a comune in the province of Brescia, in Lombardy. It lies in the lower Brescian plain on the left bank of the Mella River, near the border with the province of Cremona. The municipality covers 17.2 square kilometres (6.6 sq mi) and includes the frazione of Santa Maria degli Angeli.

== History ==
Pralboino is first mentioned in Brescia's official laws back in 1313. By 1385, tax records show it was grouped with Ostiano and Gottolengo, where it stayed when Venice took over. The Gambara family ruled the town in the early 1600s, and by 1764, it was listed as a local community with special privileges.

It officially became part of the province of Brescia after regional borders were changed in 1859. The nearby town of Milzano was combined with Pralboino in 1928, but Milzano split off to become its own town again in 1947.

Back in the 15th and 16th centuries, Pralboino developed a small group of scholars tied to the Gambara family. Local history mentions a printing press running there in the early 1500s, which printed books like Mario Nizolio's famous Latin dictionary in 1534. The poet and leader Veronica Gambara was also born in Pralboino in 1485.

During the German occupation of Italy in World War II, former Jewish prisoners in the area were arrested in Pralboino. For example, records from the CDEC Digital Library show that Julius Flesch was arrested there on January 7, 1944, and sent to Auschwitz, where he died.

== Economy and landmarks ==
Agriculture was a big part of the local economy for a long time. According to the Brescia Encyclopedia, growing flax became popular starting in the 1400s, and by the 1700s, Pralboino was well known in the area for making linen cloth, linen thread, and heavy cotton fabrics.

Church records show that the parish church of Sant'Andrea was first mentioned in 1410. Right across from the church is Palazzo Morelli, which is now the town hall. The building passed from the Emili family to the Gambara family, and then to the Morelli family in 1716, before getting a major remodel in 1874.
