= Serle =

Serle Sèrle
- Comune
- Comune di Serle
- Location within Italy Location within Lombardy
- Coordinates: 45°32′N 10°14′E
- Country: Italy
- Region: Lombardy
- Province: Brescia (BS)
- Frazioni: Berana, Biciocca, Bornidolo, Casella, Castello, Chiesa, Cocca, Flina, Gazzolo, Lazzaretto, Magrena, Manzaniga, Ronco, Salvandine, Sorsolo, Tesio, Villa, Zuzurle

Government
  - Mayor: Sorsoli Giovita

Area
  - Total: 18 km^{2} (6.9 sq mi)
- Elevation: 493 m (1,617 ft)

Population (31 December 2011)
  - Total: 3,106
  - Density: 170/km^{2} (450/sq mi)
- Demonym: Serlesi
- Time zone: UTC+1 (CET)
  - Summer (DST): UTC+2 (CEST)
- Postal code: 25080
- Dialing code: 030
- Patron saint: Saint Peter
- Saint day: June 29
- Website: Official website

Serle (Brescian: Sèrle) is a comune in the province of Brescia, in Lombardy, Italy. It is bordered by the neighboring communes of Nuvolento, Caino and Botticino.

== History ==
Framed by the mountains of Valle Sabbia, the municipality of Serle is located in a basin of the valley rising up from the river Chiese to Cariadeghe plateau. The etymology of the name could originate from this morphological feature, since serule means dolina. The area has been inhabited since the Mesolithic period. Being a Roman settlement, as shown by an old furnace, Serle was very important in the early 11th century, when the bishop of Brescia Olderico founded the monastery of San Peter in Monte Orsino on mount San Bartolomeo. The monastery had a very strong political and religious power and significantly influenced the history of a vast territory until 1446. The town became an independent municipality in 1138 and part of the "quadra di Gavardo" during the Venetian domination. The economy was based on agriculture and cattle rearing in the past; it is now supported by marble extraction, handcrafts, trading of charcoal, and building activities.

Serle played a role in the history of the Italian Risorgimento, due to the heroic acts of the Catholic priest Don Pietro Boifava (1794–1879), a protagonist of the "10 Giornate di Brescia" riot with Tito Speri.

== Places ==
=== San Bartolomeo's church ===
The church was built during the 8th century on the ruins of the Benedictine monastery. From the old coenoby, it still keeps Romanesque remains and a fresco by Paolo da Caylina il Giovane in the apse. Also, the church, still existing in 1138 and became a sanctuary of the Beata Vergine Annunciata in 1747, belonged to the monastery.

The imposing parish church dedicated to San Pietro in Vincoli and built during the early 18th century is a rare example of 18th-century style in Lombardy and a National Monument. All churches are decorated with many marble altars made by the "rezzatese" school in Rezzato during the 17th-18th centuries.

== Nature ==
The natural monument upland of Cariadeghe is very important for its environmental and speleological features. It is characterized by karstic features including dolinas, caves, and swallow holes conveying water under the ground. A large number of majestic century-old trees grow in the protected area.

== Politics ==
Since 2004 the mayor of Serle has been Gianluigi Zanola. The city council has 12 seats. After the June 2009 elections, the new city council has eight seats filled by members of the Democratic Party and four filled by The People of Freedom.
