= Berlingo =

- Comune
- Comune di Berlingo
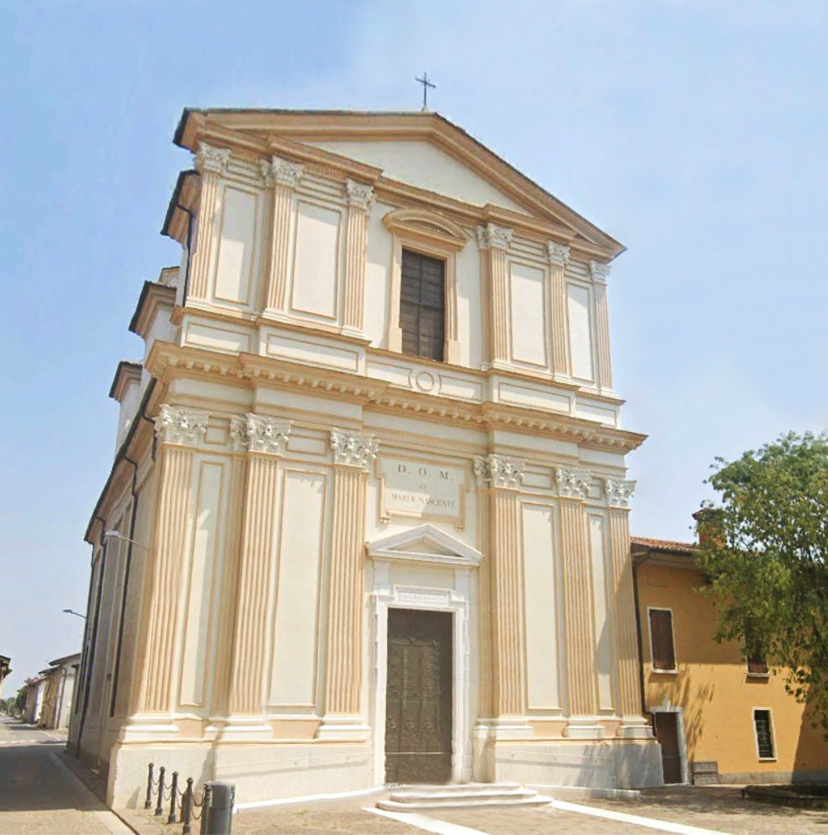
- Church in Berlingo

- Location within Italy Location within Lombardy
- Coordinates: 45°30′N 10°3′E
- Country: Italy
- Region: Lombardy
- Province: Province of Brescia (BS)
- Frazioni: Berlinghetto

Area
  - Total: 4 km^{2} (1.5 sq mi)
- Elevation: 121 m (397 ft)

Population (2011)
  - Total: 2,630
  - Density: 660/km^{2} (1,700/sq mi)
- Time zone: UTC+1 (CET)
  - Summer (DST): UTC+2 (CEST)
- Postal code: 25030
- Dialing code: 030

Berlingo (Brescian: Berlènch or Berlingh) is a comune in the province of Brescia, in Lombardy.
