= Pompiano =

Pompiano Pompià
- Comune
- Comune di Pompiano
- Location within Italy Location within Lombardy
- Coordinates: 45°26′N 9°59′E
- Country: Italy
- Region: Lombardy
- Province: Province of Brescia (BS)
- Frazioni: Gerolanuova, Zurlengo

Government
  - Mayor: Serafino Bertuletti

Area
  - Total: 15 km^{2} (5.8 sq mi)
- Elevation: 93 m (305 ft)

Population (30 April 2017)
  - Total: 3,804
  - Density: 250/km^{2} (660/sq mi)
- Demonym: Pompianesi
- Time zone: UTC+1 (CET)
  - Summer (DST): UTC+2 (CEST)
- Postal code: 25030
- Dialing code: 030
- Patron saint: Saint Andrew
- Saint day: 30 November
- Website: Official website

Pompiano (Brescian: Pompià) is a comune in the province of Brescia, Lombardy, northern Italy.
