= Cigole =

Cigole Sigole
- Comune
- Comune di Cigole
- Location within Italy Location within Lombardy
- Coordinates: 45°18′N 10°11′E
- Country: Italy
- Region: Lombardy
- Province: Province of Brescia (BS)

Area
  - Total: 9 km^{2} (3.5 sq mi)
- Elevation: 57 m (187 ft)

Population (31 December 2011)
  - Total: 1,655
  - Density: 180/km^{2} (480/sq mi)
- Demonym: Cigolesi
- Time zone: UTC+1 (CET)
  - Summer (DST): UTC+2 (CEST)
- Postal code: 25020
- Dialing code: 030
- Patron saint: San Martino
- Saint day: 11 November
- Website: Official website

Cigole (Brescian: Sigole) is a comune in the province of Brescia, in Lombardy.
