= Comezzano-Cizzago =

Comezzano-Cizzago Comesà Sisàch
- Comune
- Comune di Comezzano-Cizzago
- Location within Italy Location within Lombardy
- Coordinates: 45°28′N 9°57′E
- Country: Italy
- Region: Lombardy
- Province: Brescia (BS)
- Frazioni: Comezzano, Cizzago

Area
  - Total: 15 km^{2} (5.8 sq mi)

Population (2011)
  - Total: 3,778
  - Density: 250/km^{2} (650/sq mi)
- Time zone: UTC+1 (CET)
  - Summer (DST): UTC+2 (CEST)
- Postal code: 25030
- Dialing code: 030
- ISTAT code: 017060

Comezzano-Cizzago (Brescian: Comesà Sisàch) is a town and comune in the province of Brescia, in Lombardy.
