= Barbariga, Lombardy =

Barbariga
- Comune
- Comune di Barbariga
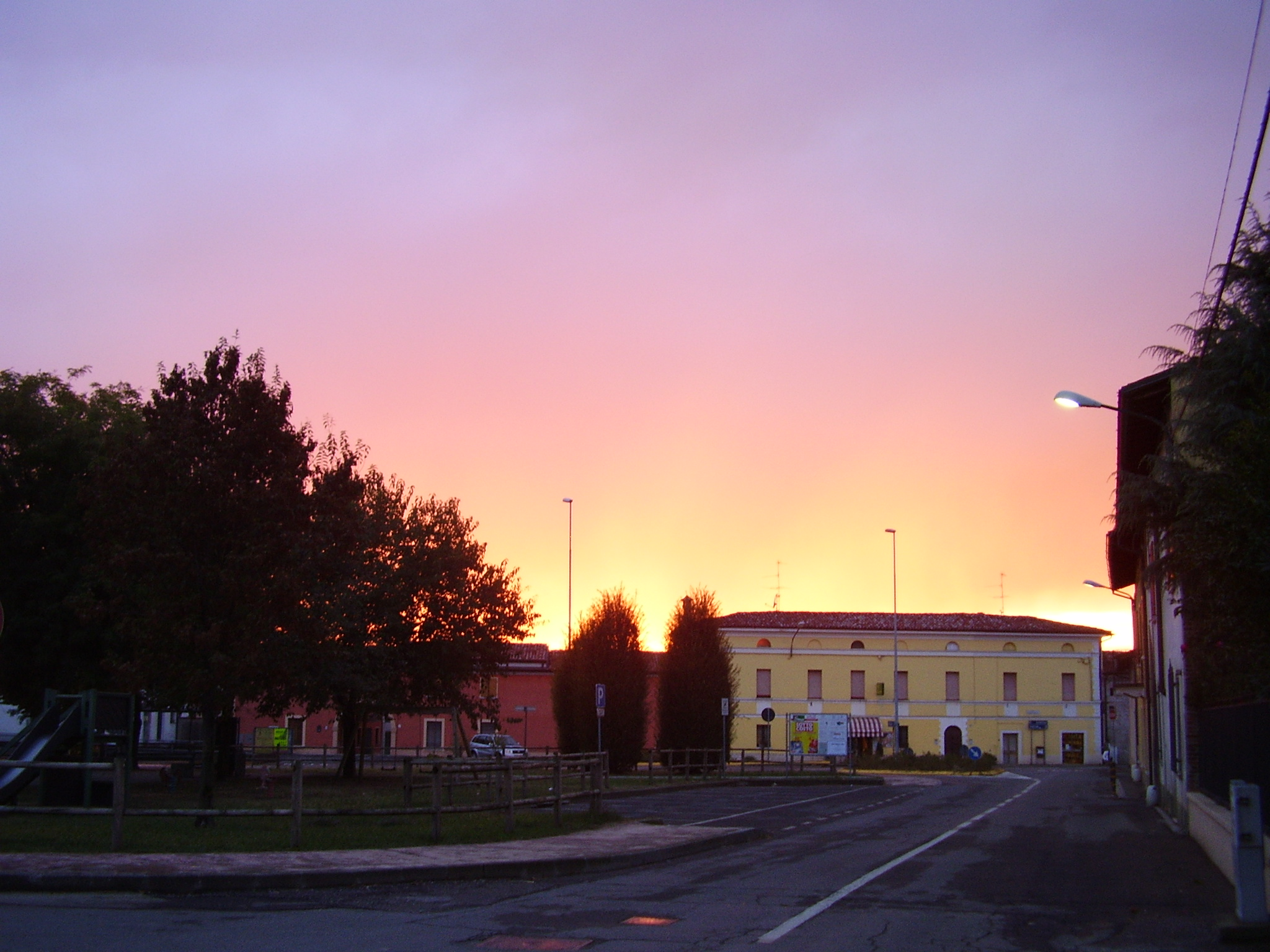
- View of Barbariga

- Location within Italy Location within Lombardy
- Coordinates: 45°24′N 10°3′E
- Country: Italy
- Region: Lombardy
- Province: Brescia
- Frazioni: Frontignano

Area
  - Total: 11.34 km^{2} (4.38 sq mi)
- Elevation: 81 m (266 ft)

Population (2011)
  - Total: 2,440
  - Density: 215/km^{2} (557/sq mi)
- Time zone: UTC+1 (CET)
  - Summer (DST): UTC+2 (CEST)
- Postal code: 25030
- Dialing code: 030
- ISTAT code: 017011
- Patron saint: St. Vito
- Saint day: 15 June
- Website: Official website

Barbariga is a comune in the province of Brescia, in Lombardy.
