= Azzano Mella =

- Comune
- Comune di Azzano Mella
- Coat of arms

- Location within Italy Location within Lombardy
- Coordinates: 45°27′N 10°07′E
- Country: Italy
- Region: Lombardy
- Province: Brescia (BS)

Government
  - Mayor: Silvano Baronchelli (Democratic Party)

Area
  - Total: 10 km^{2} (3.9 sq mi)
- Elevation: 95 m (312 ft)

Population (2011)
  - Total: 3,017
  - Density: 300/km^{2} (780/sq mi)
- Demonym: Azzanesi
- Time zone: UTC+1 (CET)
  - Summer (DST): UTC+2 (CEST)
- Postal code: 25020
- Dialing code: 030
- Patron saint: Sts. Peter and Paul
- Saint day: 29 June
- Website: Official website

Azzano Mella (Brescian: Sa) is a comune in the province of Brescia, in Lombardy, northern Italy.
