= Trenzano =

Trenzano Trensà (Lombard)
- Comune
- Comune di Trenzano
- Location within Italy Location within Lombardy
- Coordinates: 45°29′N 10°1′E
- Country: Italy
- Region: Lombardy
- Province: Brescia (BS)
- Frazioni: Bargnana, Convento, Cossirano, Pieve

Government
  - Mayor: Italo Spalenza

Area
  - Total: 20 km^{2} (7.7 sq mi)

Population (31 December 2011)
  - Total: 5,523
  - Density: 280/km^{2} (720/sq mi)
- Demonym: Trenzanesi
- Time zone: UTC+1 (CET)
  - Summer (DST): UTC+2 (CEST)
- Postal code: 25030
- Dialing code: 030
- ISTAT code: 017190
- Website: Official website

Trenzano (Brescian: Trensà; Latin: Terentianus; Cisalpine Gaulish: Terrae-enz) is a comune in the province of Brescia, in Lombardy.
