= Polpenazze del Garda =

- Comune
- Comune di Polpenazze del Garda
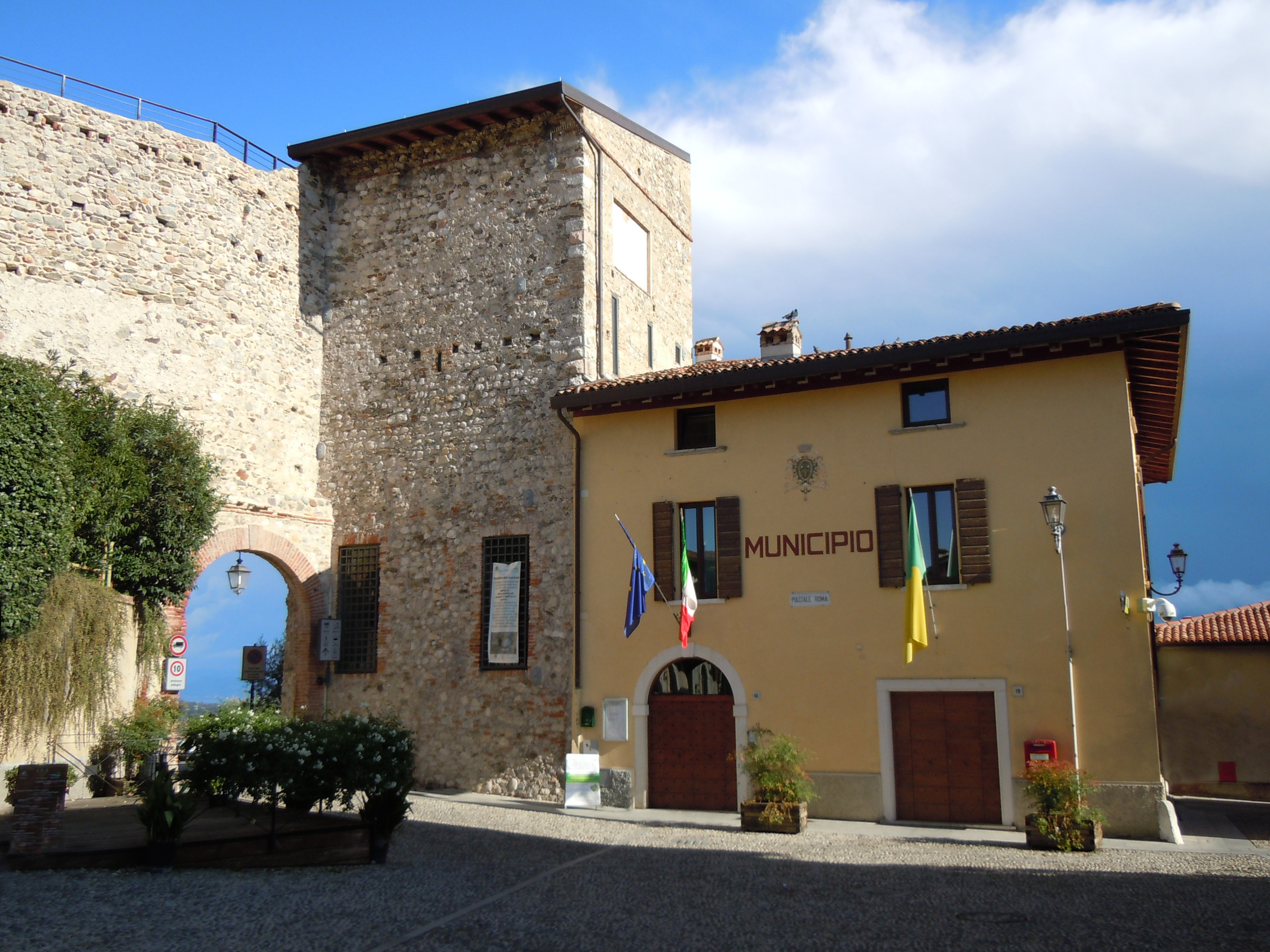

- Coat of arms

- Location within Italy Location within Lombardy
- Coordinates: 45°33′N 10°30′E
- Country: Italy
- Region: Lombardy
- Province: Brescia (BS)
- Frazioni: Picedo, Bottenago, Fontanelle, Castelletto

Government
  - Mayor: Andrea Del Prete

Area
  - Total: 9 km^{2} (3.5 sq mi)
- Elevation: 204 m (669 ft)

Population (30 April 2017)
  - Total: 2,644
  - Density: 290/km^{2} (760/sq mi)
- Demonym: Polpenazzesi
- Time zone: UTC+1 (CET)
  - Summer (DST): UTC+2 (CEST)
- Postal code: 25080
- Dialing code: 0365
- Website: Official website

Polpenazze del Garda (Gardesano: Polpenàs) is a comune in the province of Brescia, in Lombardy, northern Italy. It is situated near the western shore of Lake Garda.

== World Heritage Site ==
It is home to one or more prehistoric pile-dwelling (or stilt house) settlements that are part of the Prehistoric Pile dwellings around the Alps UNESCO World Heritage Site.
