= Alfianello =

- Comune
- Comune di Alfianello
- Coat of arms

- Location within Italy Location within Lombardy
- Coordinates: 45°16′N 10°9′E
- Country: Italy
- Region: Lombardy
- Province: Brescia

Government
  - Mayor: Matteo Zani

Area
  - Total: 13 km^{2} (5.0 sq mi)
- Elevation: 48 m (157 ft)

Population (2011)
  - Total: 2,496
  - Density: 190/km^{2} (500/sq mi)
- Demonym: Alfianellesi
- Time zone: UTC+1 (CET)
  - Summer (DST): UTC+2 (CEST)
- Postal code: 25020
- Dialing code: 030
- Patron saint: Saints Ippolito and Cassiano
- Saint day: 13 August
- Website: Official website

Alfianello (Brescian: Fianèl) is a comune in the province of Brescia, in Lombardy, northern Italy.
