= Dello, Lombardy =

Dello Dèl
- Comune
- Comune di Dello
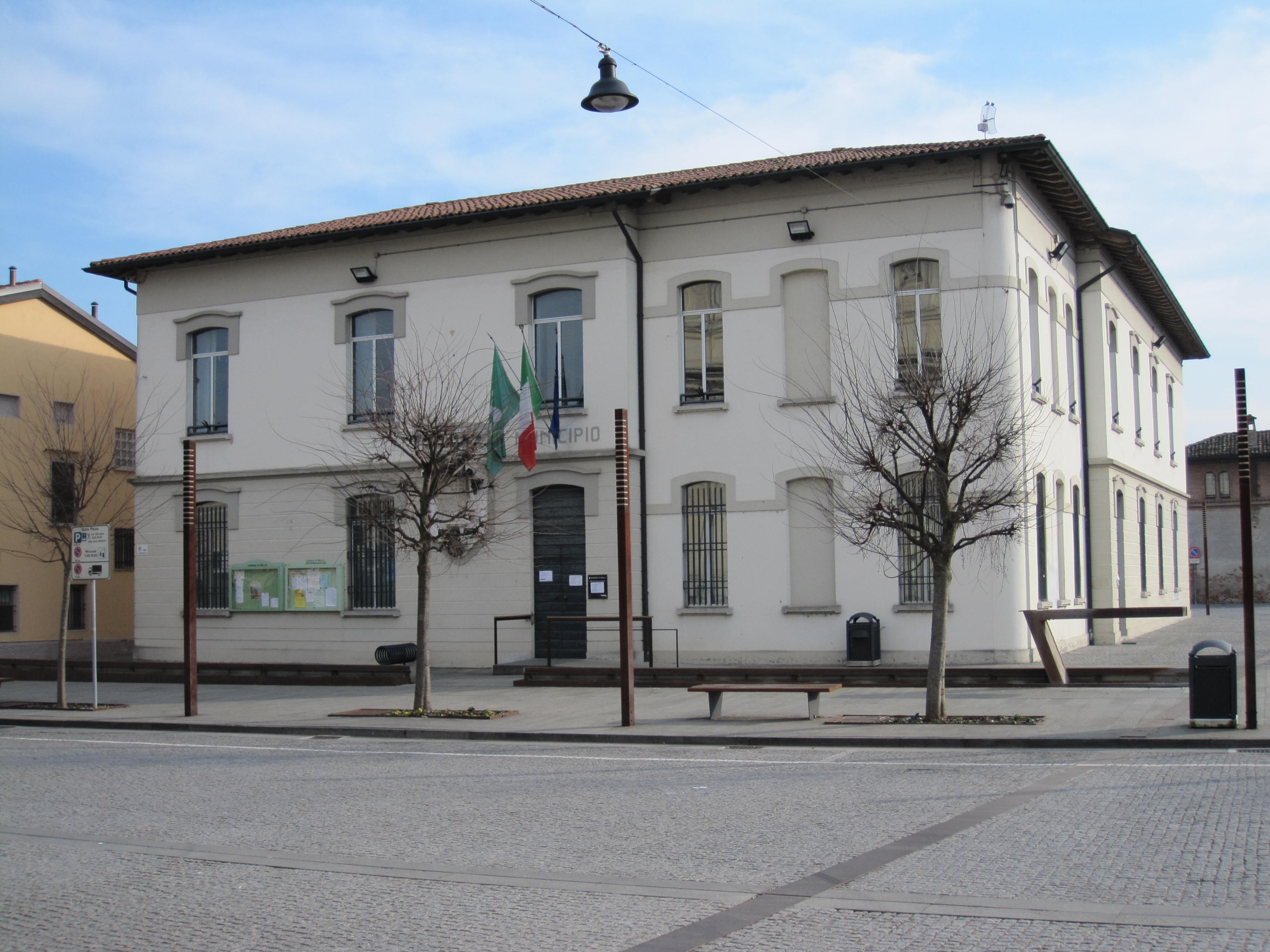
- Town hall

- Location within Italy Location within Lombardy
- Coordinates: 45°25′10″N 10°4′30″E
- Country: Italy
- Region: Lombardy
- Province: Brescia (BS)
- Frazioni: Boldeniga, Corticelle Pieve, Quinzanello

Area
  - Total: 23 km^{2} (8.9 sq mi)
- Elevation: 84 m (276 ft)

Population (2011)
  - Total: 5,639
  - Density: 250/km^{2} (630/sq mi)
- Demonym: Dellesi
- Time zone: UTC+1 (CET)
  - Summer (DST): UTC+2 (CEST)
- Postal code: 25020
- Dialing code: 030
- ISTAT code: 017066
- Patron saint: San Giorgio
- Saint day: 23 April
- Website: Official website

Dello (Brescian: Dèl) is a comune in the province of Brescia, in Lombardy.
