= Brandico =

Brandico Brandìch
- Comune
- Comune di Brandico
- Location within Italy Location within Lombardy
- Coordinates: 45°27′N 10°3′E
- Country: Italy
- Region: Lombardy
- Province: Province of Brescia (BS)
- Frazioni: Castelgonelle, Ognato

Area
  - Total: 8 km^{2} (3.1 sq mi)
- Elevation: 99 m (325 ft)

Population (2011)
  - Total: 1,671
  - Density: 210/km^{2} (540/sq mi)
- Time zone: UTC+1 (CET)
  - Summer (DST): UTC+2 (CEST)
- Postal code: 25030
- Dialing code: 030
- Website: Official website

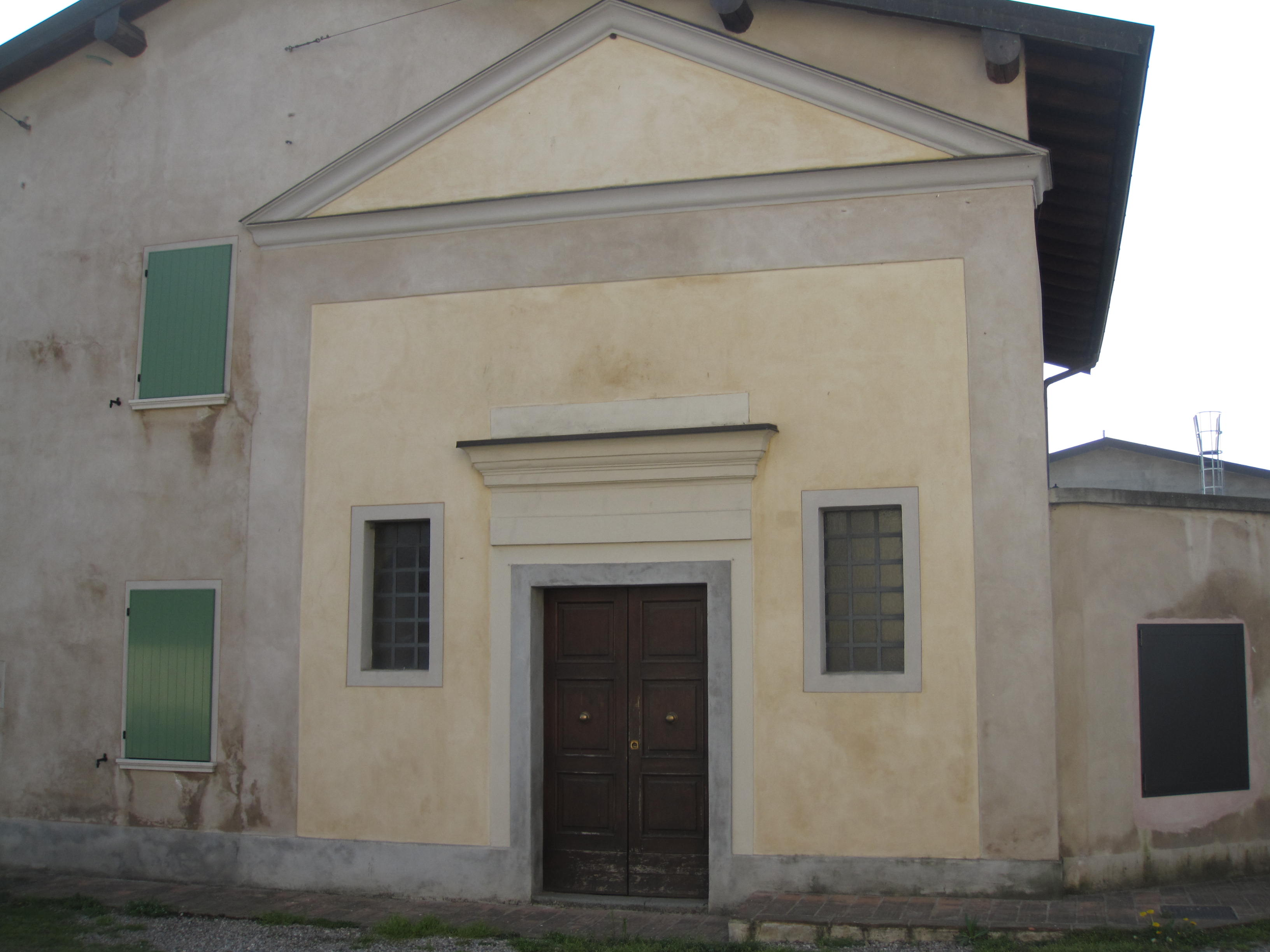
Facade of the church in Castelgonelle, Brandico

Brandico (Brescian: Brandìch) is a comune in the province of Brescia, in Lombardy. It lies within the province of Brescia, between the shores of Lake Garda and the plains of the Po River.
