= Roccafranca =

Roccafranca Ròcafranca
- Comune
- Comune di Roccafranca
- Location within Italy Location within Lombardy
- Coordinates: 45°28′N 9°55′E
- Country: Italy
- Region: Lombardy
- Province: Brescia (BS)
- Frazioni: Ludriano

Government
  - Mayor: Emiliano Valtulini

Area
  - Total: 19 km^{2} (7.3 sq mi)
- Elevation: 117 m (384 ft)

Population (31 May 2018)
  - Total: 4,730
  - Density: 250/km^{2} (640/sq mi)
- Demonym: Roccafranchesi
- Time zone: UTC+1 (CET)
  - Summer (DST): UTC+2 (CEST)
- Postal code: 25030
- Dialing code: 030
- Website: Official website

Roccafranca (Brescian: Ròcafranca) is a comune in the province of Brescia, in Lombardy, northern Italy. It is located on the left bank of the Oglio River, in the Po Plain.
