= Bedizzole =

- Comune
- Comune di Bedizzole
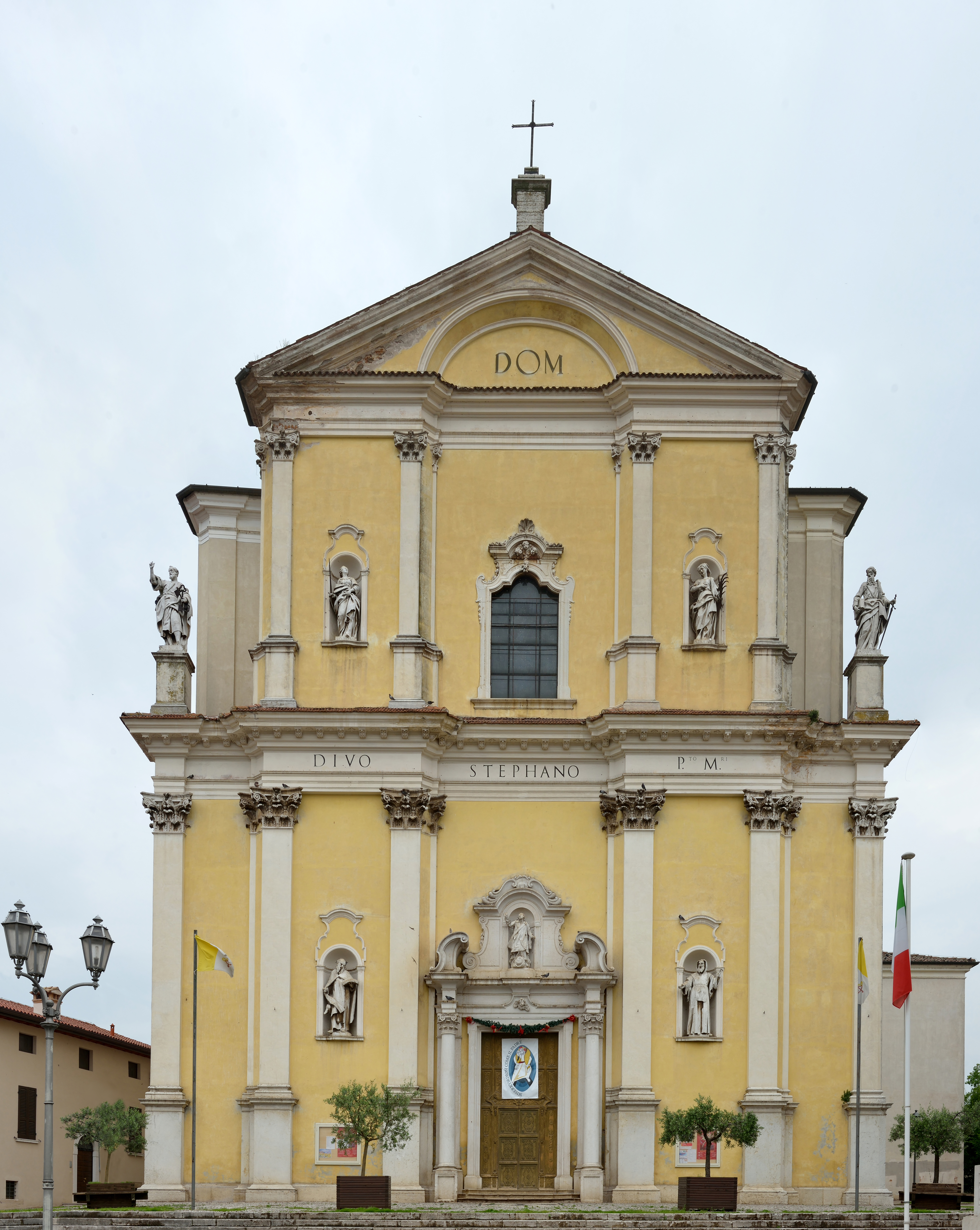
- Church of Santo Stefano, Bedizzole

- Coat of arms

- Location within Italy Location within Lombardy
- Coordinates: 45°31′N 10°25′E
- Country: Italy
- Region: Lombardy
- Province: Brescia (BS)
- Frazioni: Bussago, Campagnola, Cantrina, Cogozzo, Macesina, Masciaga, Monteroseo, Piazza, Pontenove, Salago, San Rocco, San Tomaso, San Vito, Sedesina

Government
  - Mayor: Giovanni Cottini

Area
  - Total: 26.44 km^{2} (10.21 sq mi)
- Elevation: 184 m (604 ft)

Population (30 November 2017)
  - Total: 12,290
  - Density: 464.8/km^{2} (1,204/sq mi)
- Demonym: Bedizzolesi
- Time zone: UTC+1 (CET)
  - Summer (DST): UTC+2 (CEST)
- Postal code: 25081
- Dialing code: 030
- Patron saint: St. Ermolaus
- Saint day: May 8
- Website: Official website

Bedizzole (Brescian: Büdisöle) is a municipality in the province of Brescia, in Lombardy, northern Italy.

== Geography ==
The municipality of Bedizzole extends for 26.4 km², at an average altitude of 171 m s.l.m. and is about 17 kilometers east from the chief town of the province it belongs to (Brescia) and 8 kilometers from Lake Garda.

=== Territory ===
The municipality of Bedizzole is situated to the east of Brescia, between the upper part of the Po Valley and the western hills of the moraine hills. The territory of the municipality is crossed by the river Chiese. An important monument is the castle, built between the ninth and tenth centuries, in a place that allowed to dominate the surrounding plains. Even today the Castle is inhabited, the main access to it is from Piazza 25 Aprile.
