= San Paolo (isle) =

Private island in Northern Italy

Coordinates: 45.6933356°N 10.0707996°E

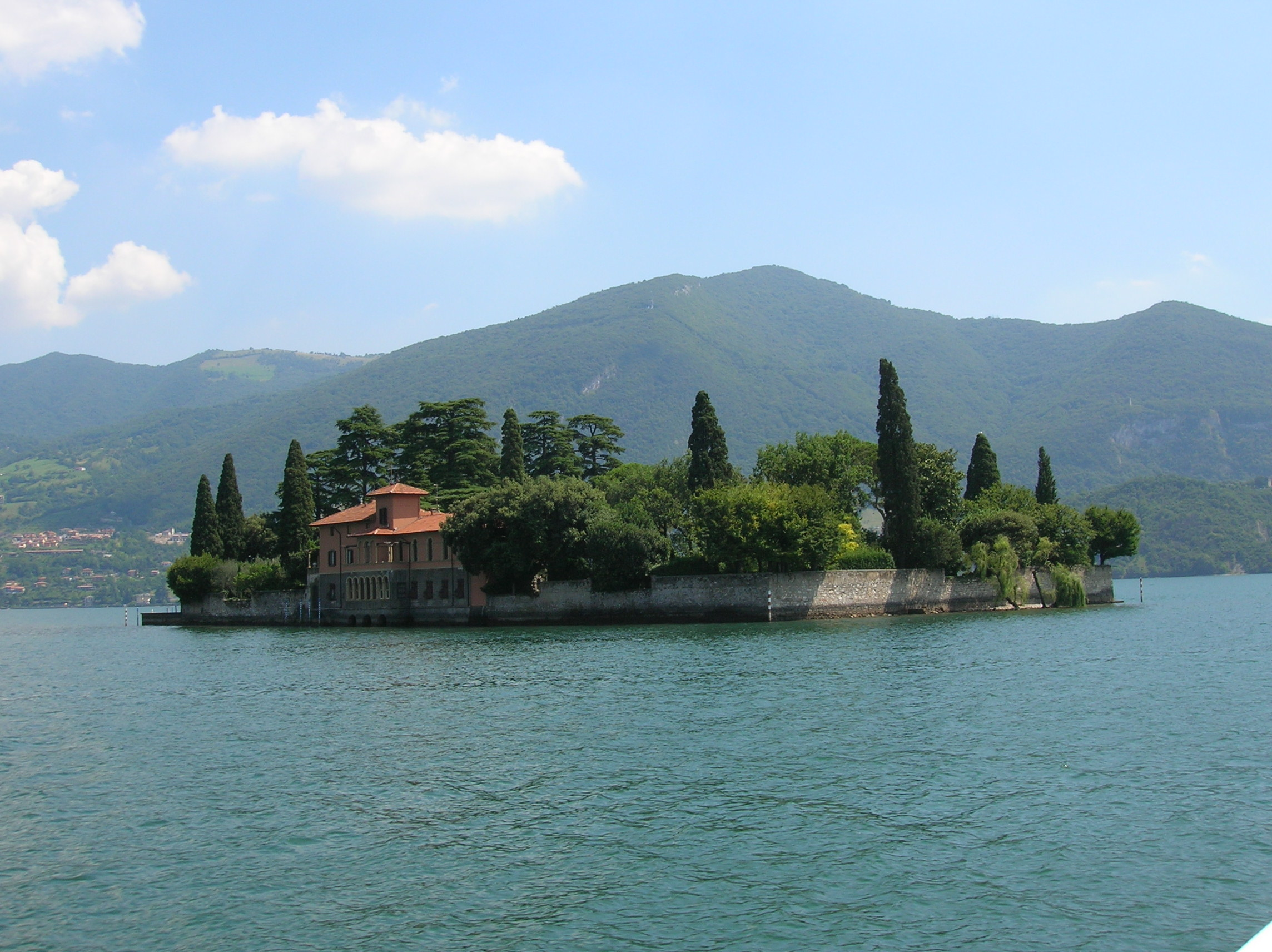

San Paolo Island (Italian: Isola di San Paolo) is a small island on Lake Iseo in Brescia, Northern Italy. The island is privately owned by the Beretta family, and the island contains a single house.

== History ==
In 1091 the islet, which was under the control of the noble Mozzi family, was donated to the Cluniac monastery of San Paolo d'Argon, which established a priory there.

The monastery later passed to the noble Fenaroli family of Pilzone, who subsequently ceded it to the Friars Minor who erected a monastery there around 1490. The Observant Friar Alessandro Fenaroli, who died on August 15, 1525, is buried in the church of San Paolo on the island.

A document dated 1685 attributed to Father Fulgenzio Rinaldi mentions:

This site is extremely salubrious… delightful, the convent comfortable and large and well-arranged which in terms of beauty can compete with quite a few in this province… It contains vegetable gardens and gardens sufficient for the enjoyment of every vegetable and to the recreation of flowers... various fruit trees; of lemons and oranges is the site.

The Fenaroli family maintained the patronage of the convent (by having their coat of arms painted in the cloister) maintaining the benefit until its suppression in January 1783. In that year, the 14 friars were transferred to the Franciscan friary in Iseo and the island sold to private individuals.

San Paolo was purchased in 1916 by the Beretta family, owners of the world's oldest active firearm manufacturing company, and is still owned by them. The current infrastructure on the island was designed by architect Egidio Dabbeni.

San Paolo Island, along with Monte Isola, was incorporated in Christo's art project The Floating Piers. Between June 18 and July 3, 2016, visitors were able to walk on floating polythene cubes covered in saffron colored fabric from the village of Sulzano to San Paolo and Monte Isola.

== See also ==
- Lake island
- List of islands of Italy
