= Monte Isola =

Monte Isola Muntìsola (Brescian)
- Comune
- Comune di Monte Isola
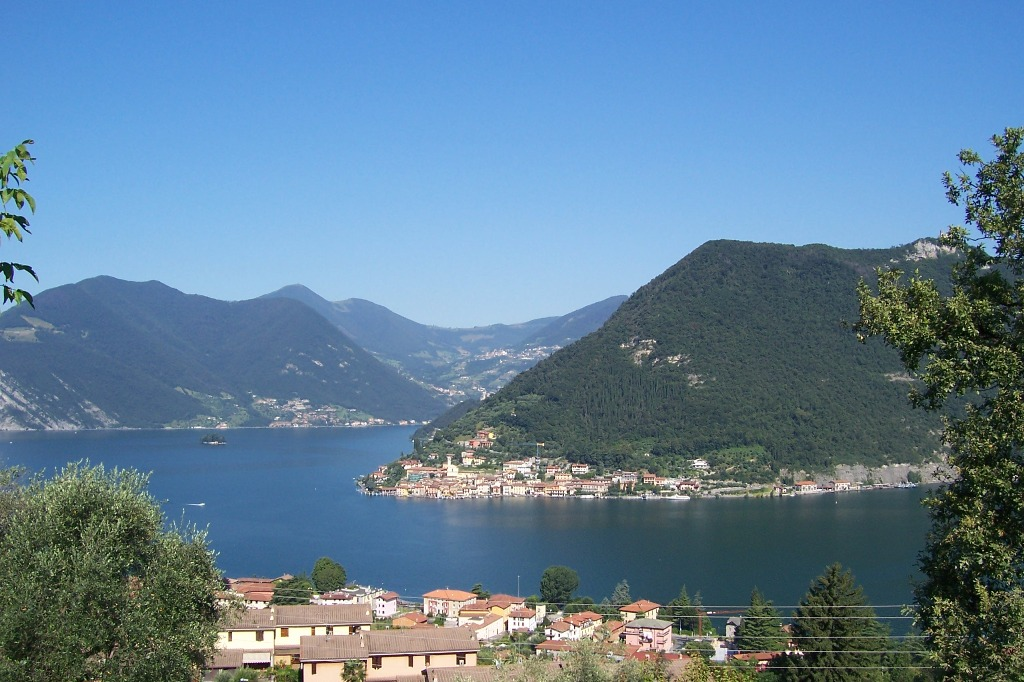
- View of Monte Isola

- Coat of arms

- Location within Italy Location within Lombardy
- Coordinates: 45°43′N 10°05′E
- Country: Italy
- Region: Lombardy
- Province: Brescia (BS)
- Frazioni: Corzano, Cure, Masse, Menzino, Novale, Olzano, Peschiera Maraglio, Porto di Siviano, Sensole, Senzano, Sinchignano, Siviano

Government
  - Mayor: Fiorello Turla

Area
  - Total: 12.61 km^{2} (4.87 sq mi)
- Elevation: 275 m (902 ft)

Population (2026)
  - Total: 1,576
  - Density: 125.0/km^{2} (323.7/sq mi)
- Demonym: Montisolani
- Time zone: UTC+1 (CET)
  - Summer (DST): UTC+2 (CEST)
- Postal code: 25050
- Dialing code: 030
- Patron saint: Sts. Faustino and Jovita
- Saint day: 15 February
- Website: Official website

Monte Isola (also known by the name of the main island Montisola; Brescian: Muntìsola) is a town and comune (municipality) in the Province of Brescia in the region of Lombardy in Italy. It is one of I Borghi più belli d'Italia ("The most beautiful villages of Italy").

It is located on the islands Montisola (the major island, from which it takes the name), Loreto and San Paolo in Lake Iseo and, as of 2026, its population is 1,576. Monte Isola's population is approximately spread over eleven villages and hamlets. There are several churches built between the 15th and the 17th century with frescoes, statues, altars in vernacular art.

== History ==
There are indications of a Roman settlement. The first written document mentioning "Insulae curtis" dates from 905, when the island was listed among the properties of the monastery of S. Salvatore in Brescia. The family Oldofredi, rulers of Iseo, built on the island two strongholds in the 11th-12th centuries. Members of the powerful Visconti family came here to hunt in 1400. In 1497 Francesco Sforza, duke of Milan, gave the islanders some fishing rights and reduced the taxes. In the same year, Caterina Cornaro, queen of Cyprus, resided a while on the island. During the 19th century the main industry on the island was the construction of boats and the manufacturing of fishing nets.

Peschiera Maraglio and Siviano (the municipal seat) merged in 1929 to create the actual comune.

In June and early July, 2016, Monte Isola was the site of The Floating Piers by artists Christo and Jeanne-Claude.

== Geography ==
The municipality covers a total area of 12.8 square kilometres (4.9 sq mi); the main island, Monte Isola, with an area of 4.5 square kilometres (1.7 sq mi) ranks as the largest lake island not only in Italy, but also in South and Central Europe, but is dwarfed by the large lake islands in Northern Europe. The peak of the island at 600 metres (1,969 feet) above sea level is 415 metres (1,362 feet) above the average surface elevation of Lake Iseo (185 m (607 ft)), making Monte Isola one of the highest lake islands in Europe.

Monte Isola includes 12 frazioni: Carzano, Cure, Masse, Menzino, Novale, Olzano, Peschiera Maraglio, Porto di Siviano, Sensole, Senzano, Sinchignano and Siviano.

The bordering municipalities are Iseo, Marone, Sale Marasino, Sulzano, Parzanica, Tavernola Bergamasca and Sarnico.

There are two main ports Carzano and Peschiera with a frequent ferry service with the surrounding mainland villages, including Iseo.

== Demographics ==
As of 2026, the population is 1,576, of which 50.3% are male, and 49.7% are female. Minors make up 11.0% of the population, and seniors make up 29.8%.

Historical population

| Year | Pop. | ±% |
|---|---|---|
| 1861 | 1,179 | — |
| 1871 | 1,161 | −1.5% |
| 1881 | 1,141 | −1.7% |
| 1901 | 1,297 | +13.7% |
| 1911 | 1,547 | +19.3% |
| 1921 | 1,615 | +4.4% |
| 1931 | 1,814 | +12.3% |
| 1936 | 1,582 | −12.8% |

| Year | Pop. | ±% |
|---|---|---|
| 1951 | 1,846 | +16.7% |
| 1961 | 1,968 | +6.6% |
| 1971 | 1,878 | −4.6% |
| 1981 | 1,868 | −0.5% |
| 1991 | 1,745 | −6.6% |
| 2001 | 1,769 | +1.4% |
| 2011 | 1,804 | +2.0% |
| 2021 | 1,628 | −9.8% |

Source: ISTAT

=== Immigration ===
As of 2025, immigrants make up 5.7% of the population. The 5 largest foreign countries of birth are Switzerland, Brazil, Belgium, Bangladesh, and Cuba.

== Main sights ==
The single-nave church of San Michele in Peschiera Maraglio was consecrated in 1648. This baroque church is notable for the many frescoes on the walls and on the ceiling and for its wooden carvings.

The shrine of Madonna della Ceriola stands 600 metres (1,969 feet) above sea level, the highest spot on the island. It can only be reached by walking from the small village of Cure.

The fortress Martinengo can be reached from Menzino. It was built in the 15th century by the Oldofredi family and enlarged in the 16th century by Martinengo. After a long period of neglect, it has been renovated in an elegant residence by the architect Vittorio Faglia. In 1497 Catherine Cornaro, queen of Cyprus, sojourned here for a short stay.

== Transport ==
Monte Isola can be reached through a network of ferry connection with regular schedules.

Driving restrictions are currently enforced, with mopeds and bicycles only allowed on the island. Hiking trails, most of which permit bicycles, span the island, reaching the peaceful villages in the lakeside and in the hills, as well as the Madonna della Ceriola chapel, nested near the summit of the island. A circular road of almost 9 km (6 mi) allows a complete tour of Monte Isola by foot, bicycle, or scooter.

A regular bus service, with special buses, is operated by the municipality of Monte Isola.

== Gallery ==
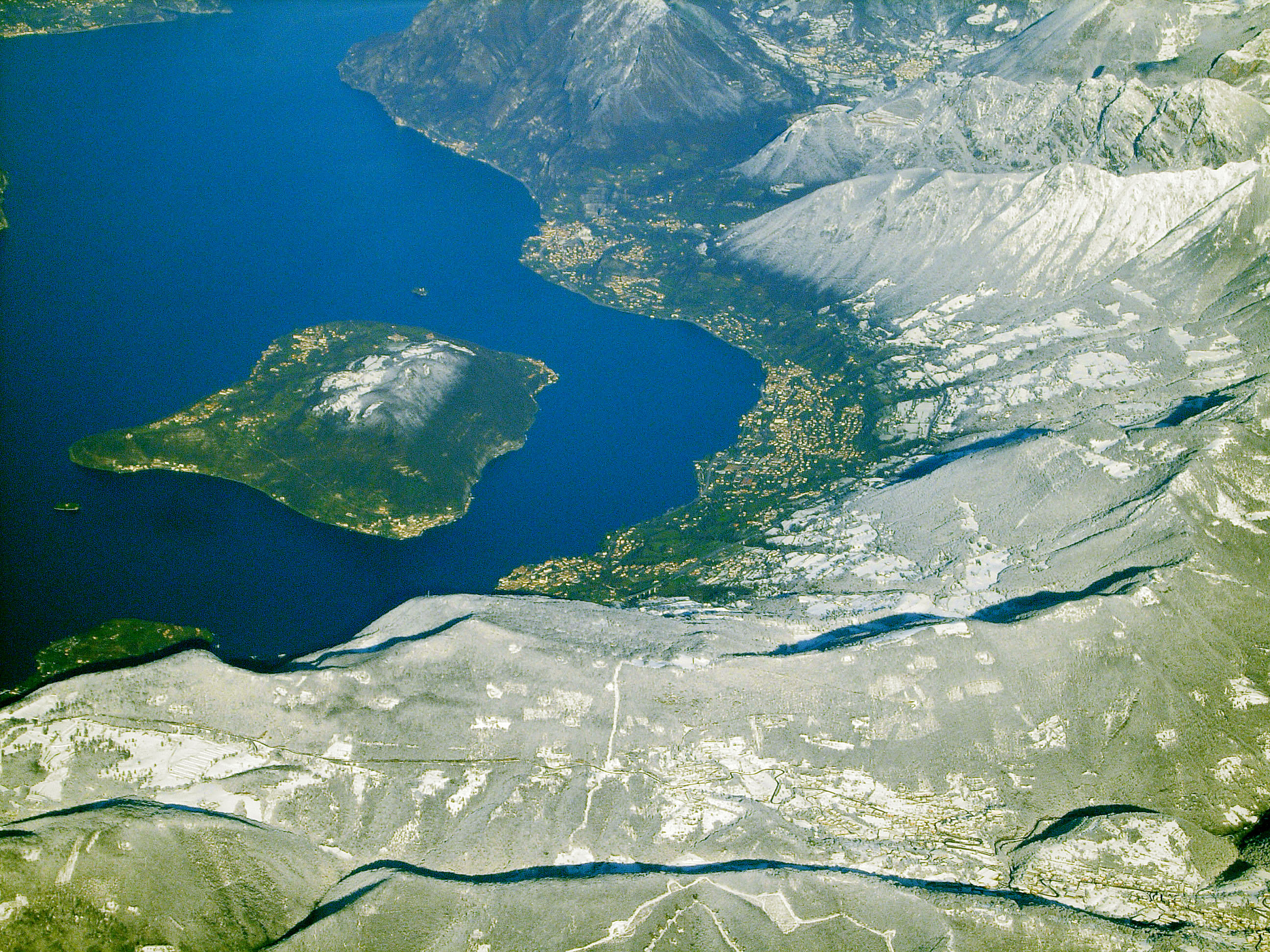
Aerial view of Monte Isola (both Montisola island, Loreto isle and San Paolo isle) and part of the Brescia shore of the Iseo lake in winter

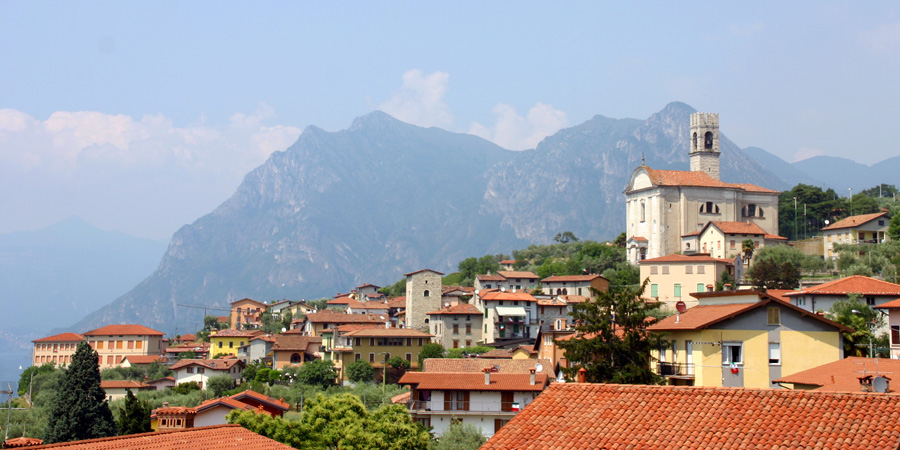
View of Siviano

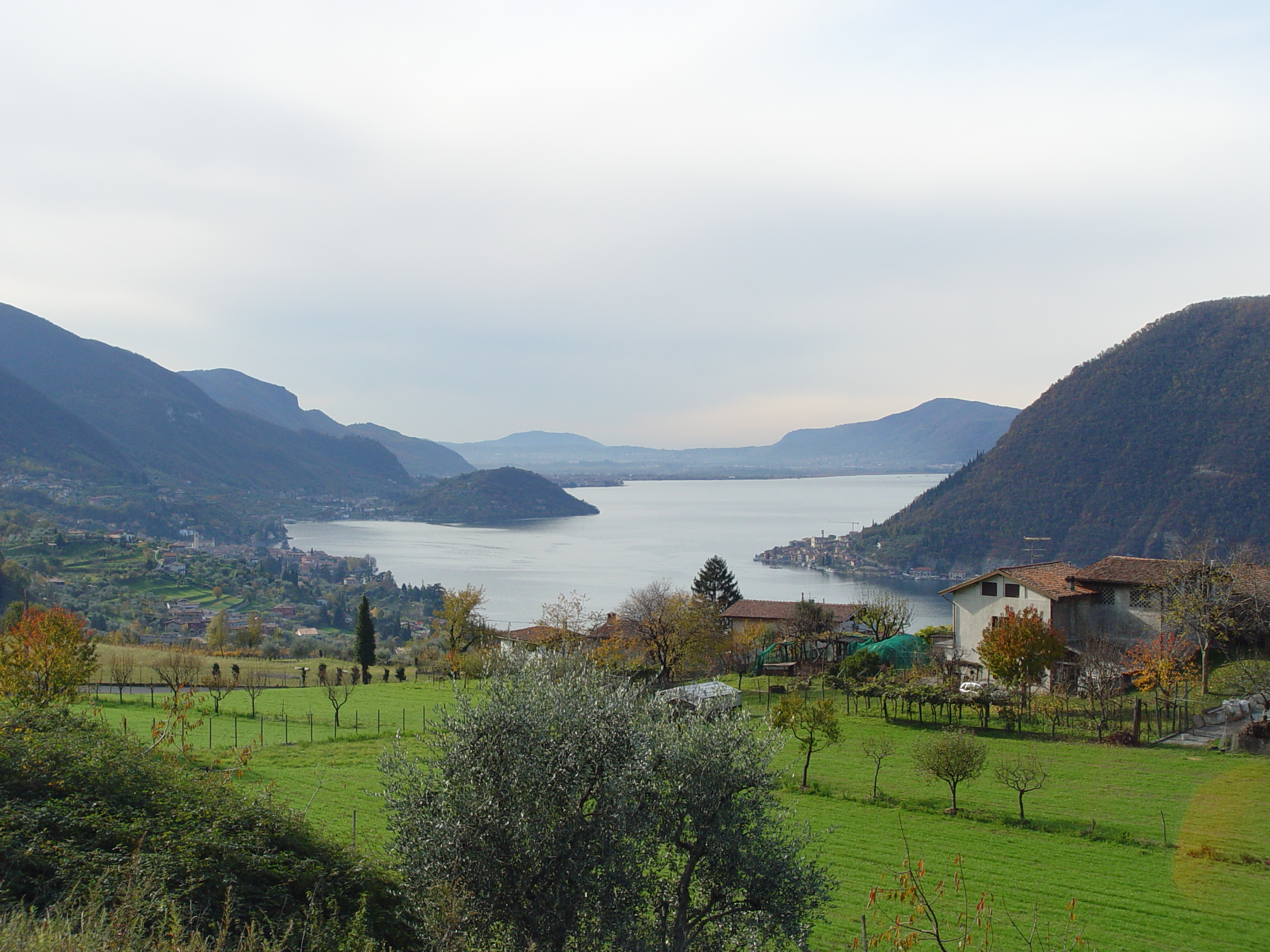
Southern view of Lake Iseo, with Peschiera Maraglio and Sulzano

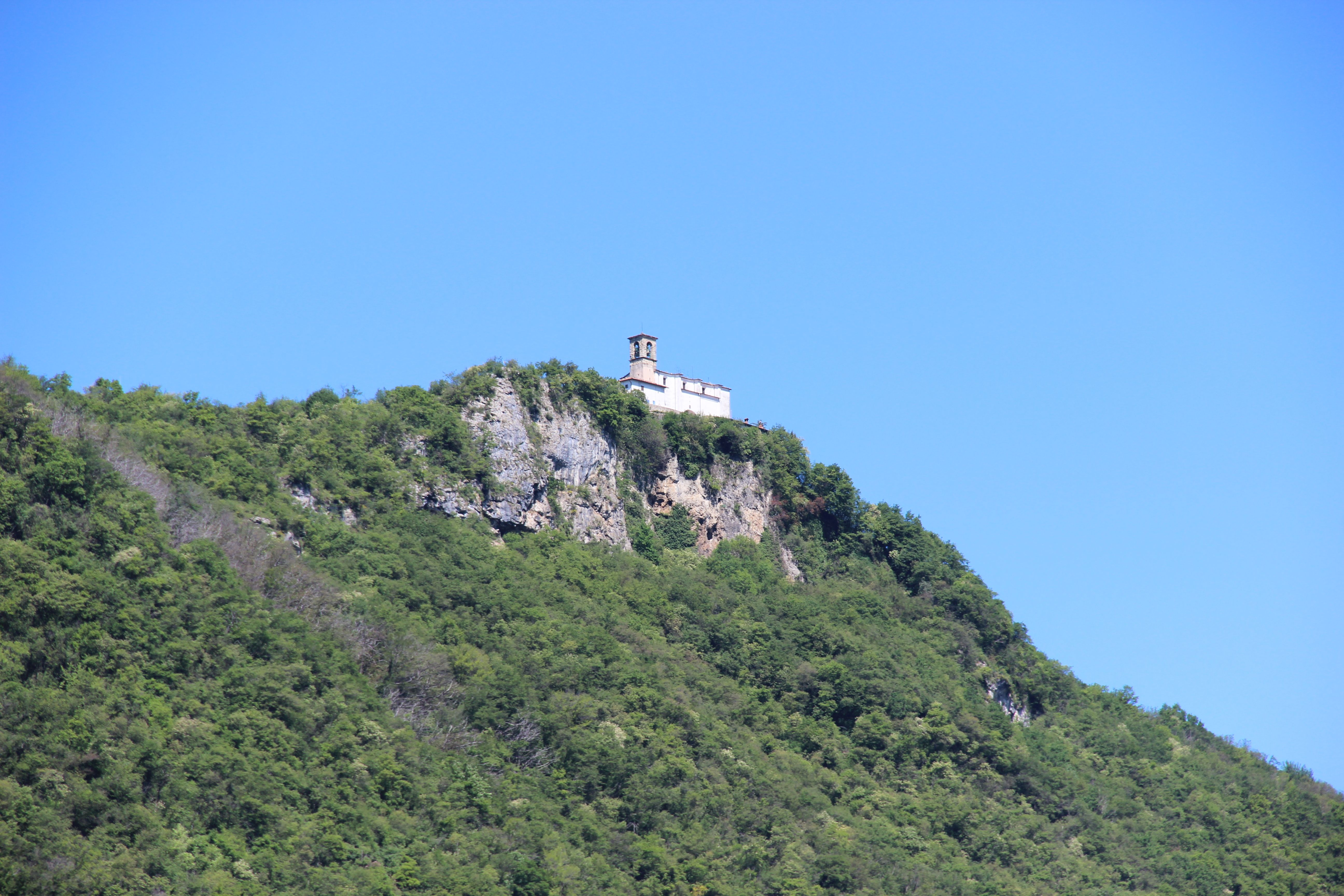
The shrine of Madonna della Ceriola in the highest point of the island

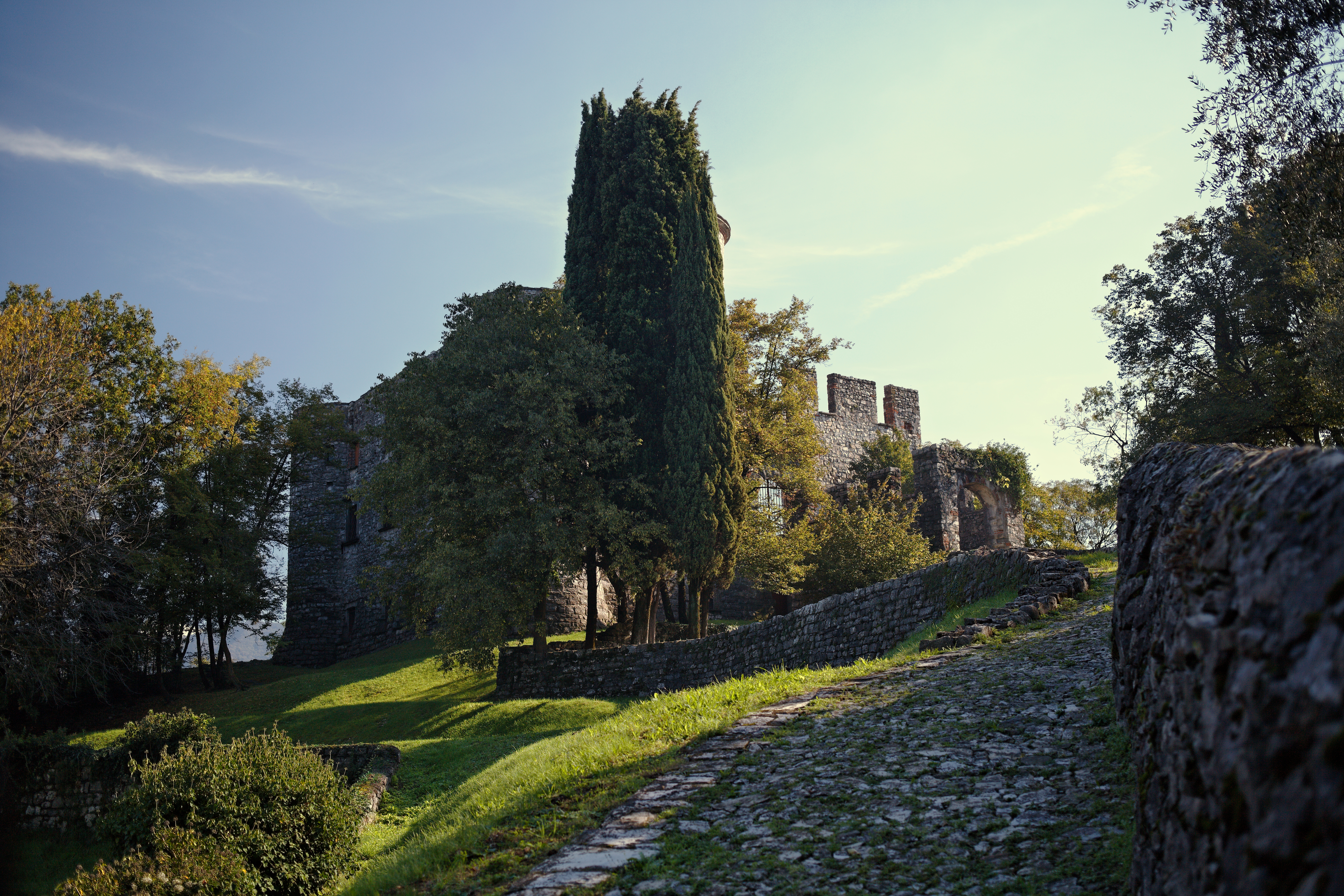
The fortress of Monte Isola

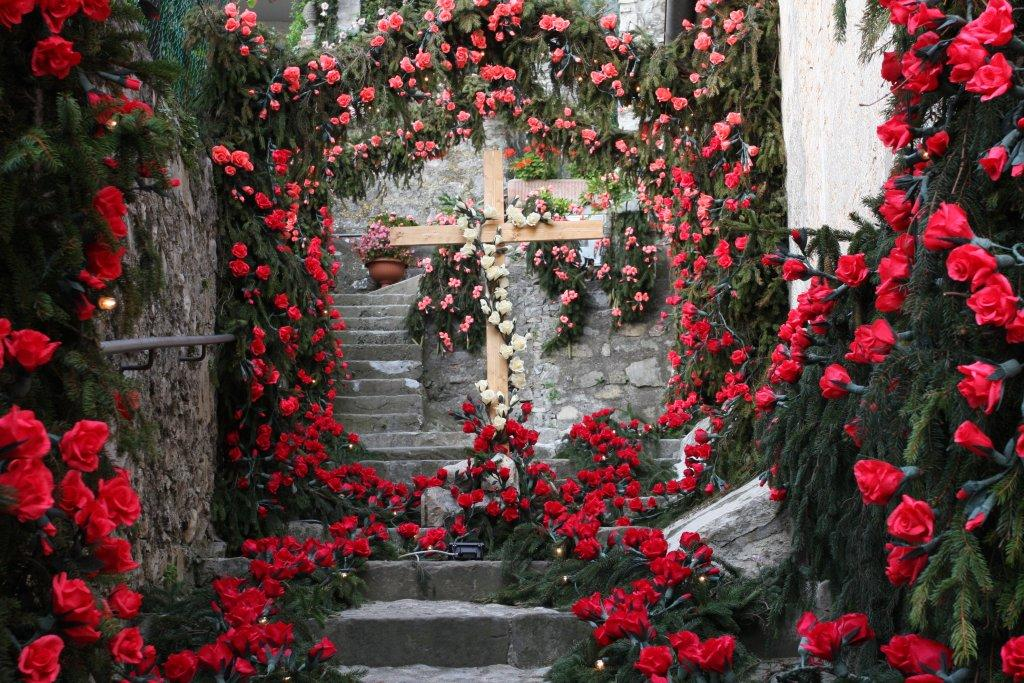
The streets of Monte Isola decorated with flowers during the Holy Cross week in September

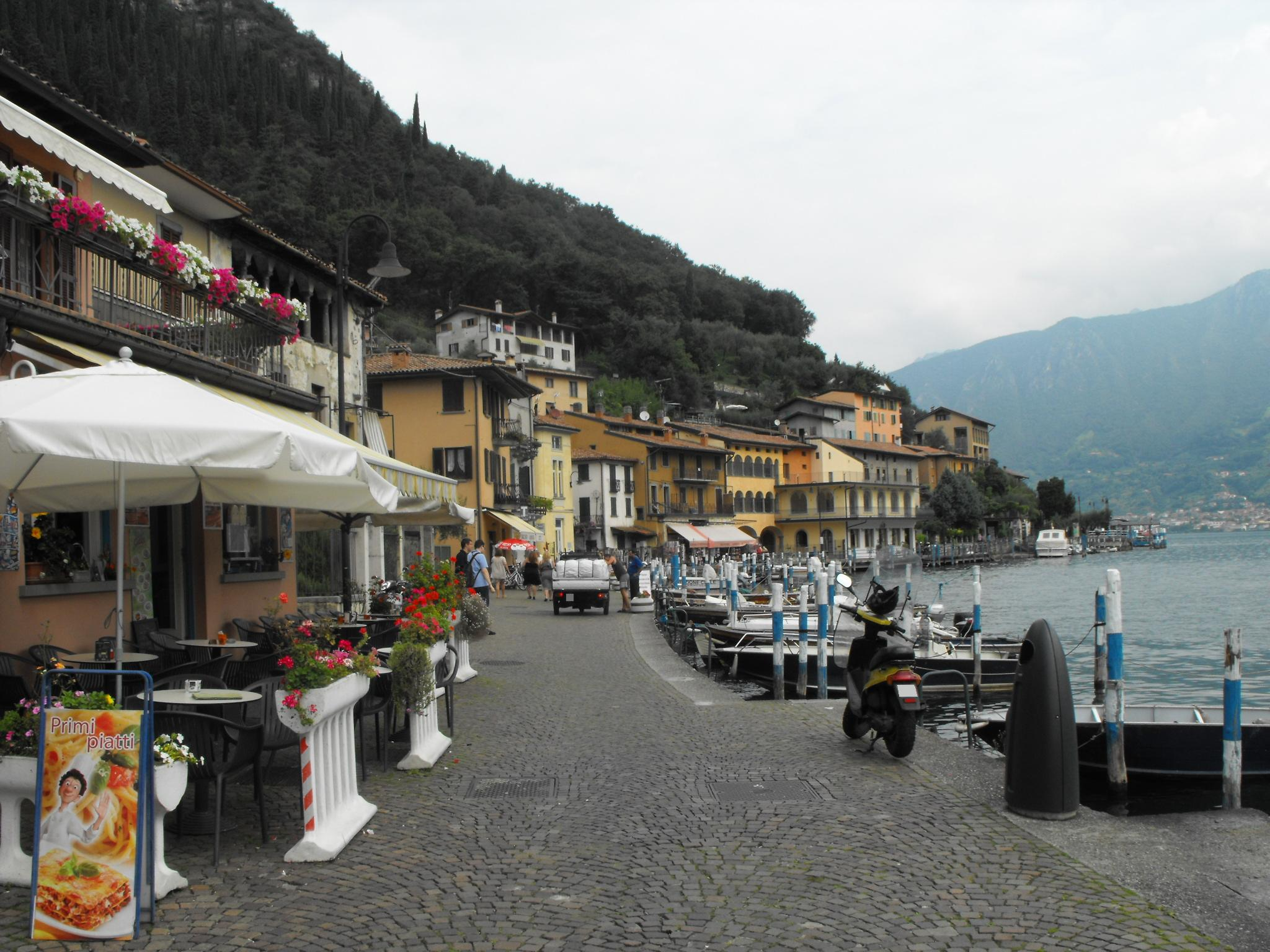
View of the port in Peschiera Maraglio

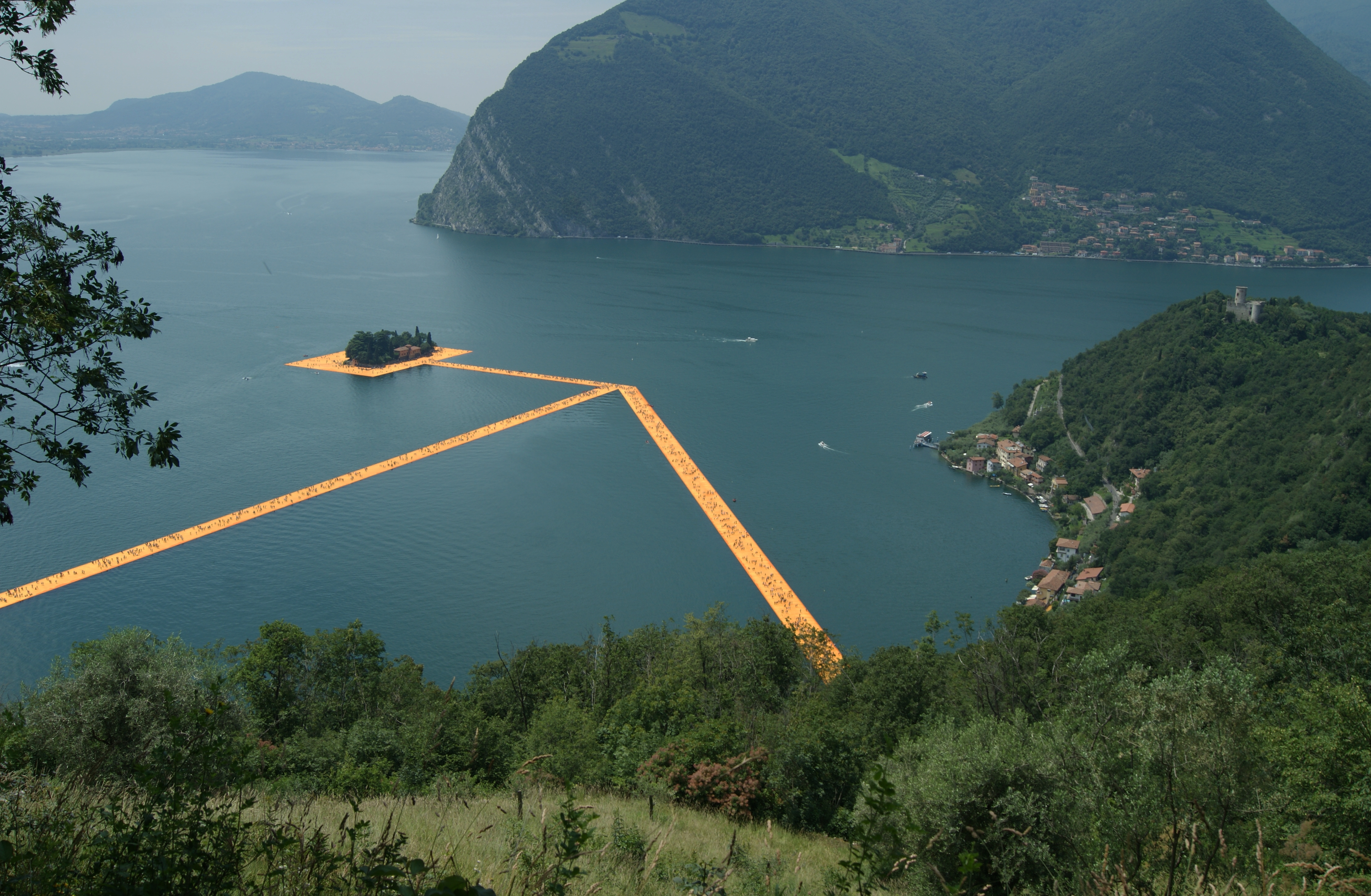
View from Montisola of The Floating Piers and the San Paolo isle in the middle, Gallinarga (Tavernola Bergamasca, province of Bergamo) in the left side of the background, and Clusane (Iseo, BS) in the right side of the background, 2016
