= Clusane =

Locality in Iseo, Lombardy, Italy

Clusane (known as Crüsane in the Brescian dialect) is a locality of the municipality of Iseo, in Lombardy, Italy. Until 1927 it was an independent municipality, with its last mayor being Francesco Martinelli.

Located on the Brescian shore of Lake Iseo, the small village might derive its name from "Clodius," which would give rise to "Clodianae." Clusane borders Paratico, Cremignane (a hamlet of Iseo), and Colombaro in the municipality of Corte Franca.

== History ==
Since the Early Middle Ages, Clusane hosted a "castrum," which by the 11th century was already under the control of the Counts of Mozzo or Mozzi, a family of Frankish origin. During the same period, two Cluniac monks were sent to Clusane, where they founded a priory. The monks were engaged in land reclamation and the construction of agricultural structures.

In the Cluniac Monastery, which corresponds to today's Carmagnola Castle, the original nucleus of the historic center developed. Among the significant locations in Clusane is also the Chiesa Vecchia (Old Church), a deconsecrated building now transformed into a small theater.

Clusane remained an autonomous municipality until 1927, when, with the Royal Decree No. 2253 of November 17, it was merged with Iseo. During the Napoleonic era, the village was annexed to Colombaro but regained its independence with the establishment of the Lombardo-Venetian Kingdom, only to be later reabsorbed into Iseo.

In 1861, Clusane had a population of 738 and was included in the district of Chiari. After the 1927 merger with Iseo, a modernization process began, including the construction of the new parish church.

Today, the village extends into the surrounding countryside, characterized by the cultivation of cereals, vineyards, mulberries, olive trees, and fruit trees.

== Landmarks and Points of Interest ==
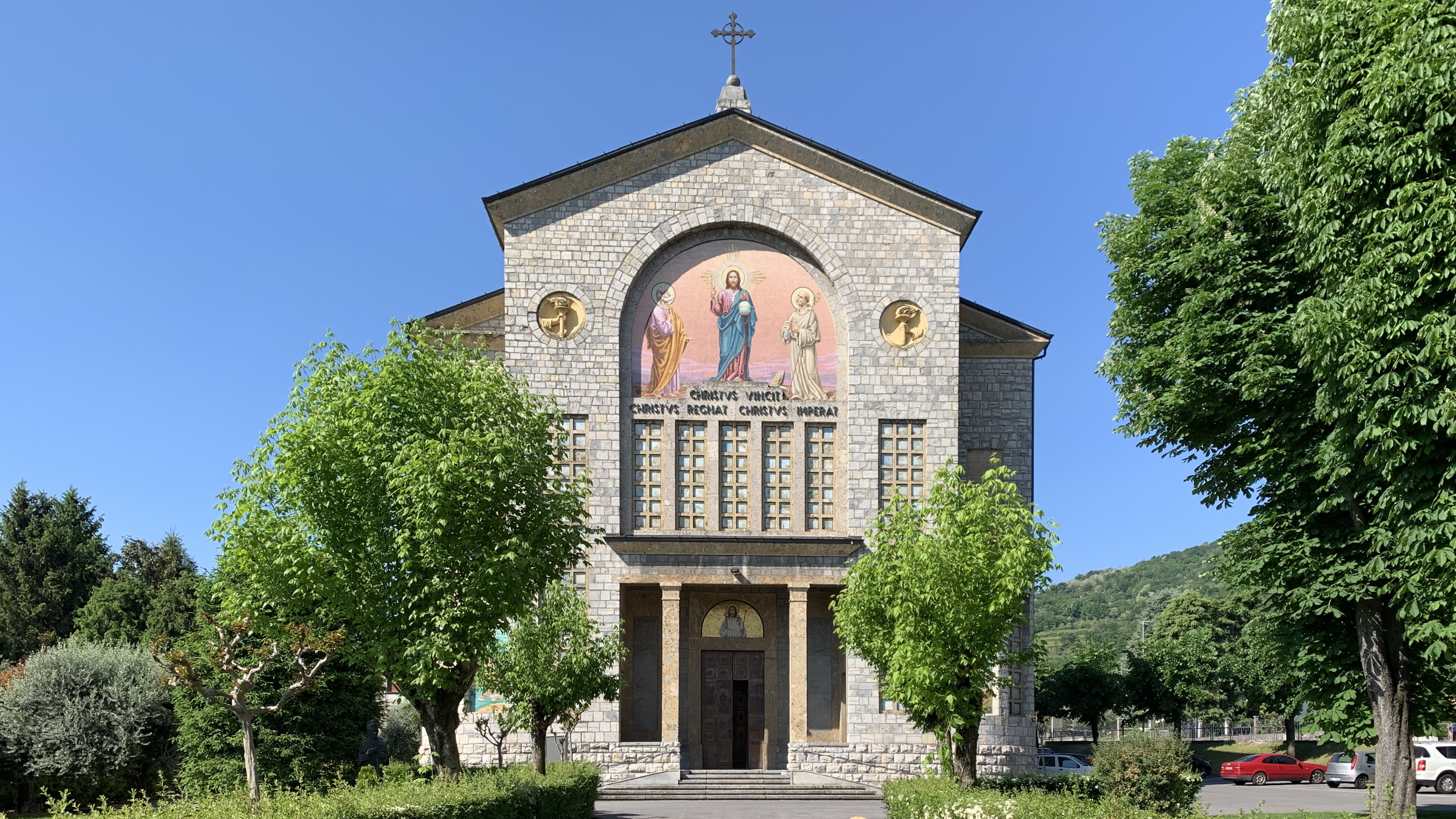
Parish Church of Clusane

=== Religious Architecture ===
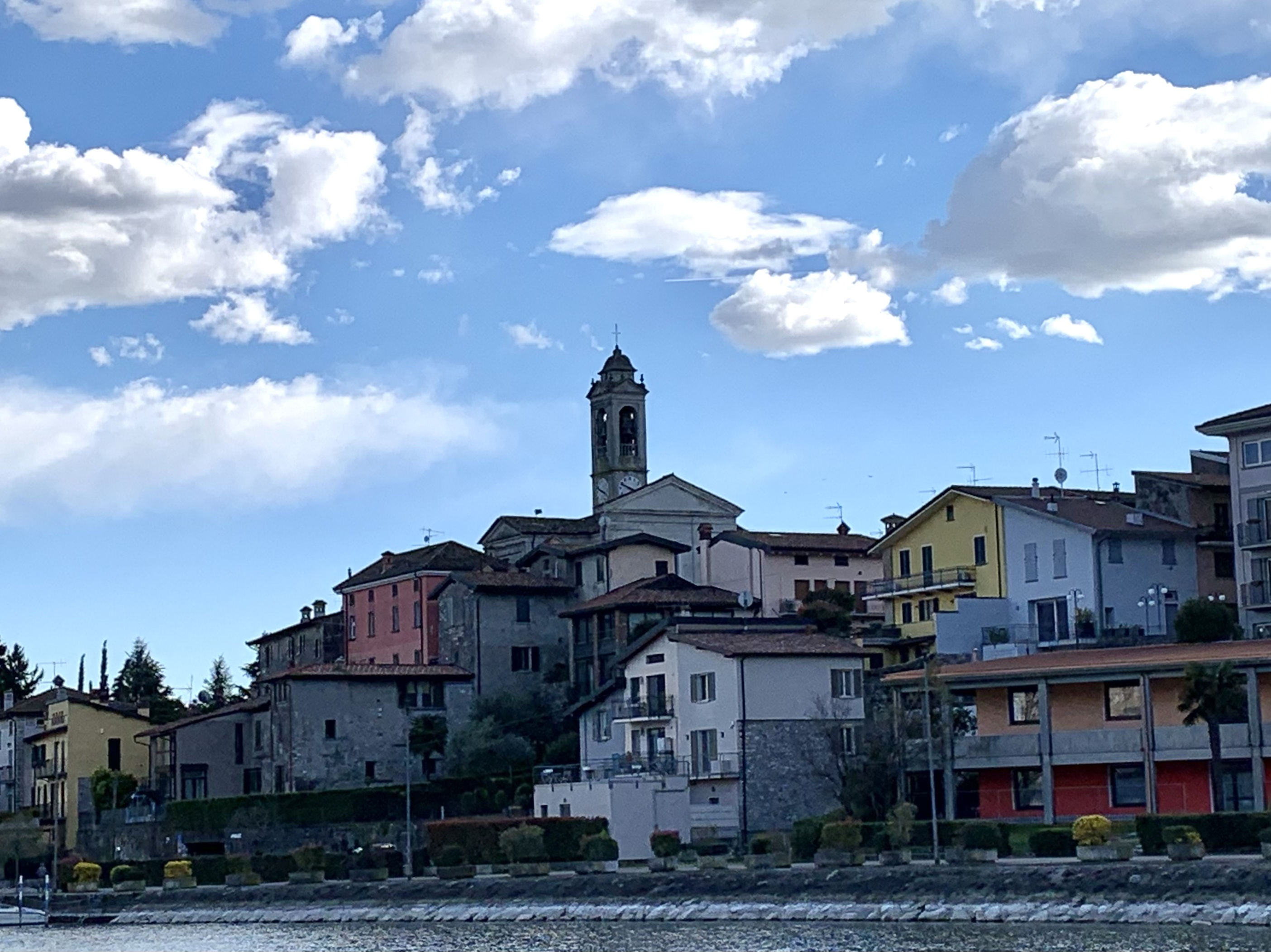
Old Church seen from the port

Along Via Risorgimento, one of the main streets, stands the Archpresbytery of Christ the King of the Universe. The construction of this building, commissioned by parish priest Monsignor Bernardo Guatta, began in 1932 and was completed in 1935. It was consecrated the same year by Giacinto Tredici, Archbishop of Brescia. The church houses several statues by Claudio Botta and frescoes by Vittorio Trainini. The remains of Monsignor Bernardo Guatta rest at the altar dedicated to the saint of the same name.

In the historic center is also the Old Church, dedicated to Saints Gervasius and Protasius. It was deconsecrated in the 1900s after the construction of the new parish church and is now used as an auditorium. The bell tower remains functional as the church on Via Risorgimento lacks one.

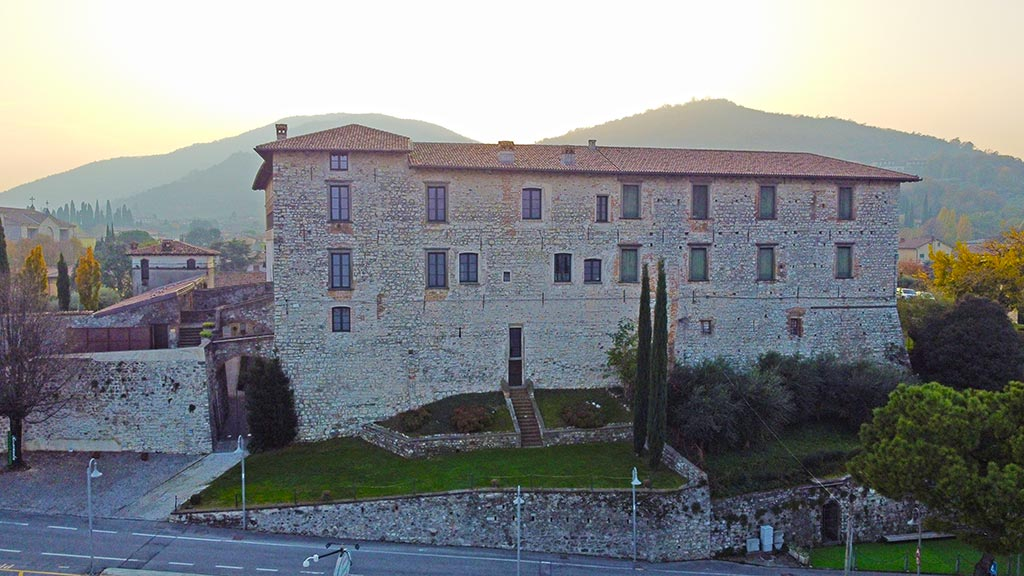
Carmagnola Castle

=== Military Architecture ===
The Carmagnola Castle is a large quadrangular building with an internal courtyard and a loggia offering a beautiful view of the lake. It was built in the 1400s by the Oldofredi family, feudal lords of Franciacorta and Lake Iseo. The fortress was home to the condottiero Francesco Bussone, known as "Il Carmagnola."

After restoration, funded in part by the Italian Ministry of Cultural Heritage and Activities, the castle has been made accessible to visitors.

== Culture ==
=== Events ===
The most significant event is the "Week of the baked tench with polenta," held annually during the third week of July. On the Sunday before the festival, restaurants participating in the Operatori Turistici Clusane (OTC) association organize a dinner on the lakeside promenade.

Also notable is the Clusane Carnival, featuring colorful floats parading through the main streets of the village.

In 2024, Clusane hosted the first edition of the Lake Iseo International Chess Tournament.

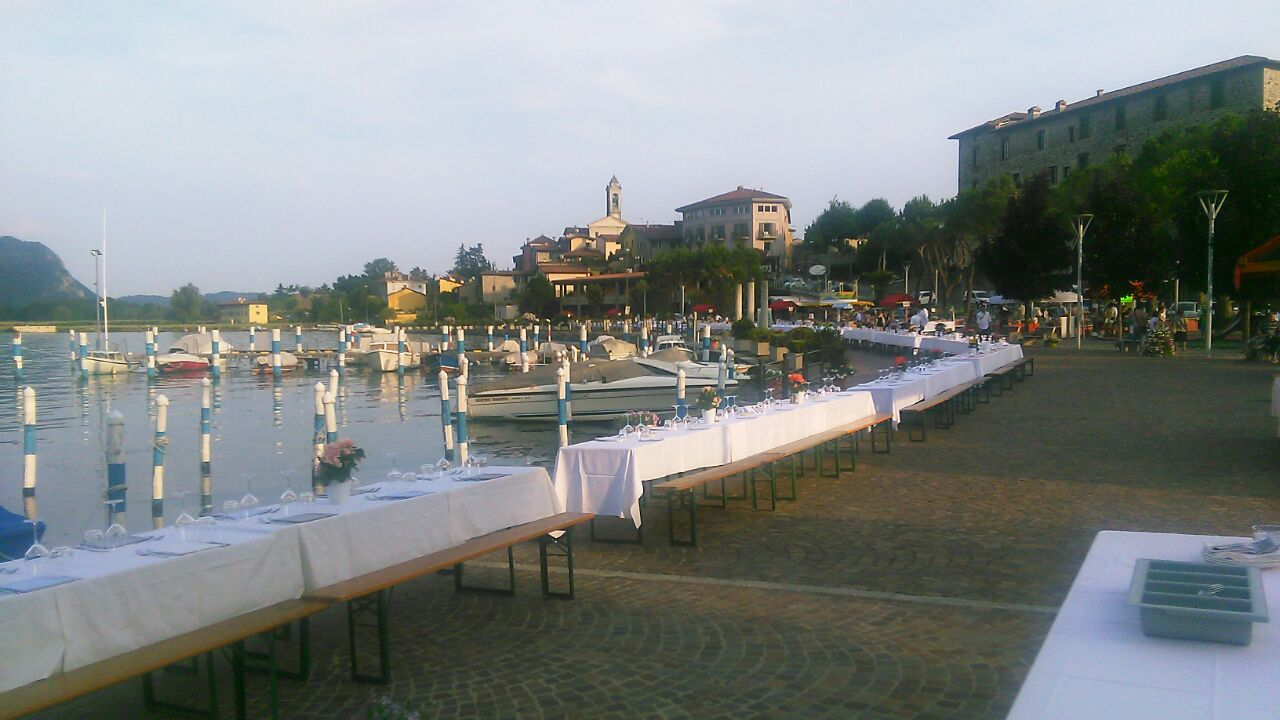
Lakeside Dinner

== Infrastructure and transport ==
=== Buses ===
Clusane is served by several intercity bus lines managed by the Brescia South Transport Consortium.

The bus lines serving Clusane are:

- "LS002" (Sarnico-Iseo)
- "LS003" (Iseo-Palazzolo-Chiari)
- "LS021" (Iseo-Orzinuovi)
- "LS027" (Brescia-Cazzago San Martino-Clusane)

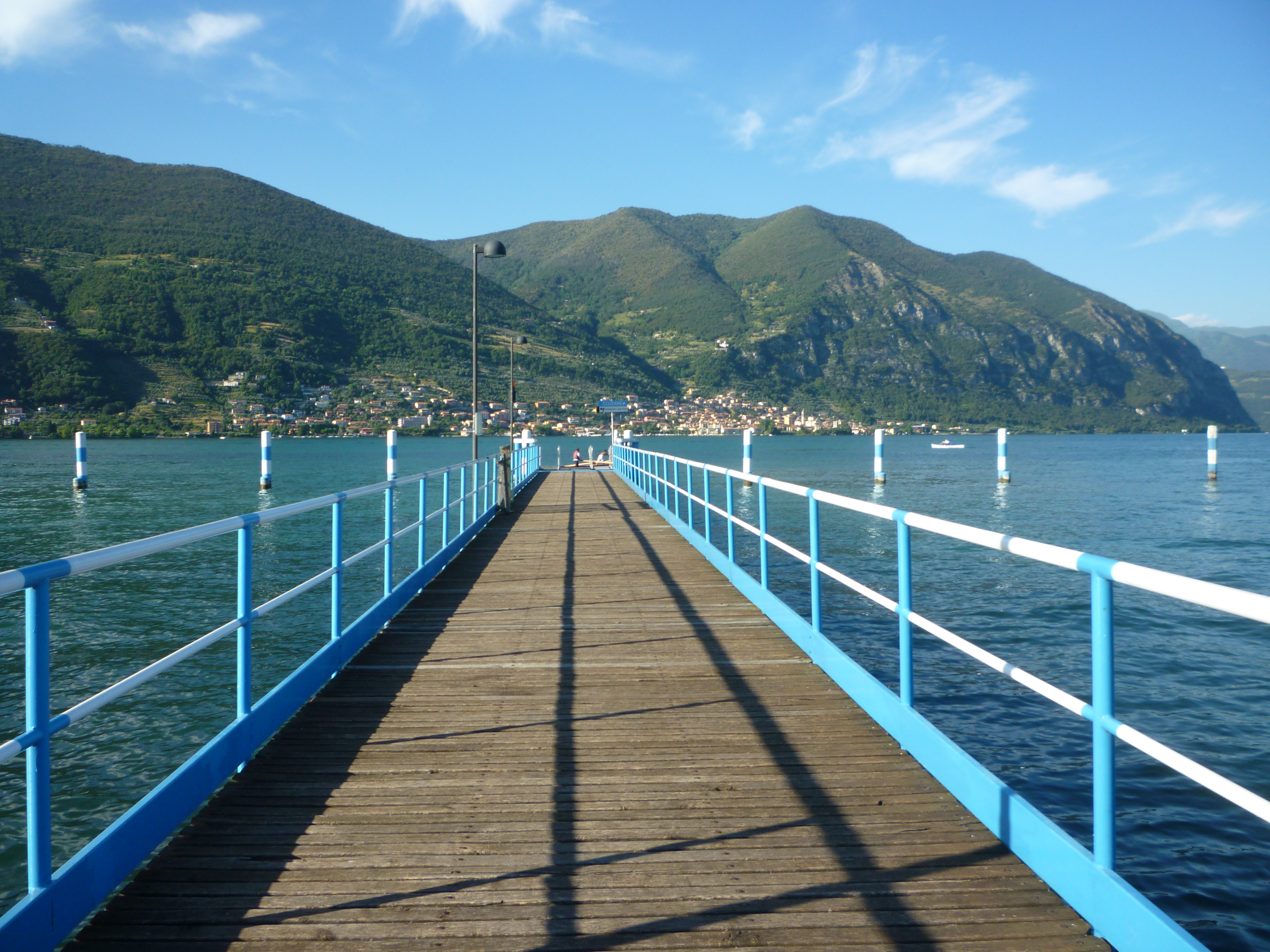
Clusane Pier

=== Ferries ===
Clusane has a port, and during the summer and on holidays, it is connected to other locations on Lake Iseo by several lines operated by Navigazione Lago d'Iseo.

== Sports ==
Clusane is home to a group of standing rowers, "Clusanina," who compete on Lake Iseo using the traditional naét boats, on Lake Garda with bissa boats, and nationally in the ViP750 standing rowing championship.

Another sport played in Clusane is 7-a-side football. The oratory team, named Giaffa Clusane, participates in the CSI championship of the province of Brescia.

== See also ==
- Iseo-Rovato-Chiari Tramway
