= Polaveno =

Polaveno Polàen
- Comune
- Comune di Polaveno
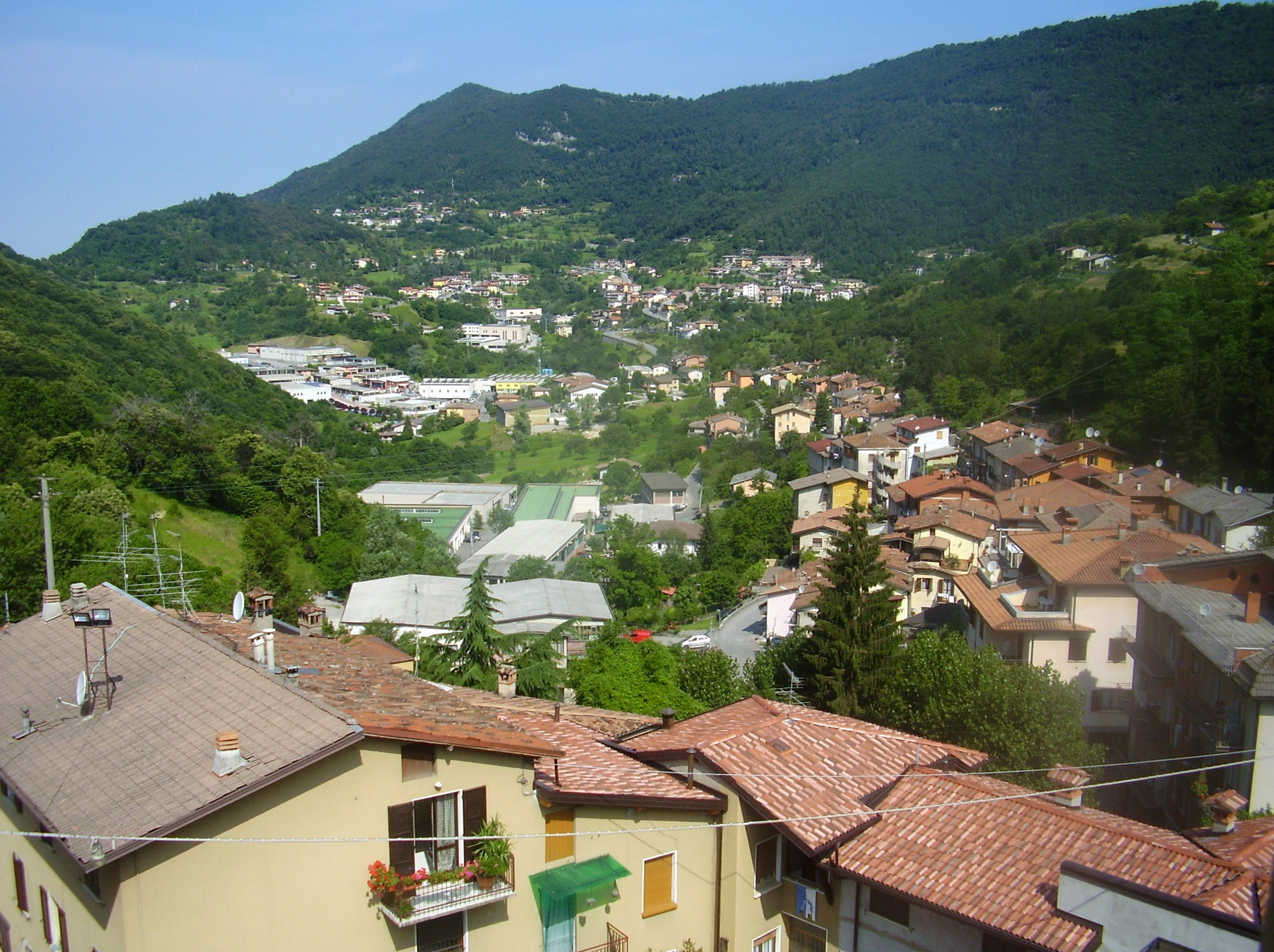

- Location within Italy Location within Lombardy
- Coordinates: 45°39′N 10°7′E
- Country: Italy
- Region: Lombardy
- Province: Province of Brescia (BS)
- Frazioni: Polaveno, San Giovanni, Gombio

Area
  - Total: 9 km^{2} (3.5 sq mi)
- Elevation: 560 m (1,840 ft)

Population (2011)
  - Total: 2,672
  - Density: 300/km^{2} (770/sq mi)
- Demonym: Polavenesi
- Time zone: UTC+1 (CET)
  - Summer (DST): UTC+2 (CEST)
- Postal code: 25060
- Dialing code: 030
- Website: Official website

Polaveno (Brescian: Polàen) is a comune in the province of Brescia, in Lombardy. Neighbouring communes are Sarezzo, Iseo, Ome and Sulzano.
