= Madonna della Ceriola =

Sanctuary of Madonna della Ceriola
- Santuario della Madonna della Ceriola
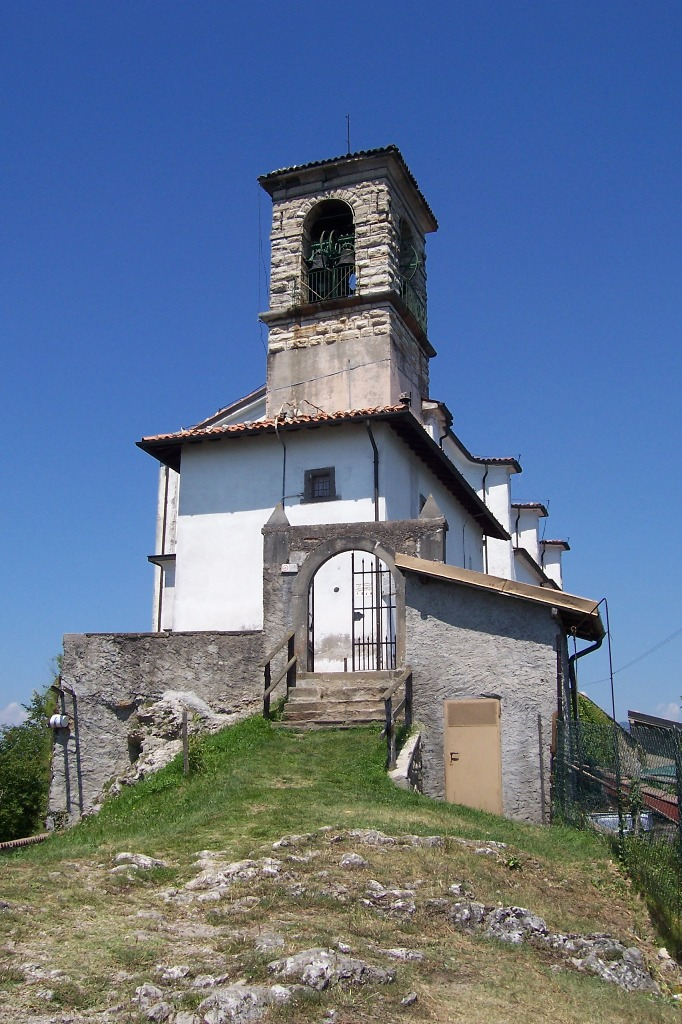
- View of the shrine from bell tower side

- Location within Italy
- 45.70339°N 10.08933°E
- Location: Monte Isola
- Country: Italy
- Denomination: Catholic
- Website: www.visitmonteisola.it

History
- Founded: 11th century
- Dedication: Madonna della Ceriola (or Madonna della Candelora)

Architecture
- Architectural type: Mainly baroque
- Completed: 1750

Administration
- Diocese: Diocese of Brescia

The Sanctuary of Madonna della Ceriola (Italian: santuario della Madonna della Ceriola), is a Roman Catholic church in the municipality of Monte Isola, Italy. It is located on the summit of the lake island also named Monte Isola.

== Location ==
The church is located at an elevation of 600 MSL in the highest point of the island, which has extensive views of Lake Iseo and its surrounding mountains. The closest village to the sanctuary is Cure (466 MSL).

== History ==
A first church on the top of the mountain was built during the 13th century, likely on a pagan temple location. Present-day building was fulfilled in the 16th century, but its inner part was modified the following century by the insertion of a new chancel. The bell tower was built in 1750.

The church was the first Marian shrine to be built near Lake Iseo. The wooden statue worshipped in the shrine goes back to the 12th century and is known as Madonna della Ceriola presumably because it was engraved in a block of Austrian oak wood (in Italian cerro). It represents the Holy Virgin on a throne taking baby Jesus with her arms.

Inside the church, with some frescoes and paintings and two fine saints' statues flanking the Virgin, there are many ex-voto tablets celebrating numerous miracles attributed the Madonna. One of the most resonant among them was the protection granted to the islanders against a cholera outbreak of 1816: in sign of gratitude every second Sunday of July is still celebrated a feast called Madonna del Cholera (Madonna of the Cholera). In 1924, the statue was solemnly adorned with a golden crown made from gold donated by the inhabitants of Monte Isola.

== Access to the church ==
The Sanctuary is reached by a cobbled mule-track linking it with the village of Cure. Fifteen chapels built in the second part of the 20th century and depicting the mysteries of the Rosary are located alongside the last part of the track. The shrine can also be accessed following a longer walking path starting near Peschiera Maraglio jetty (185 MSL).

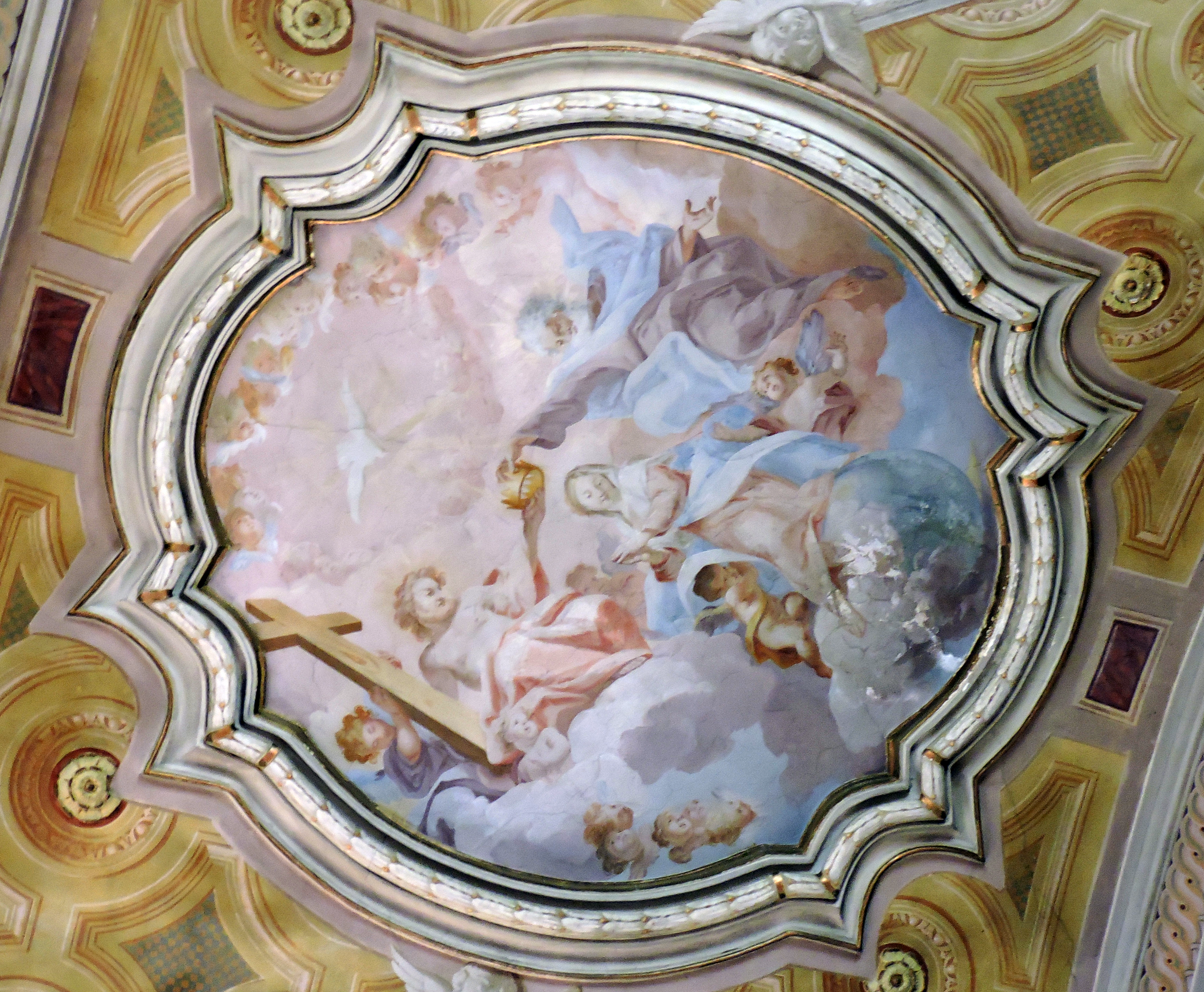
Vault frescoes

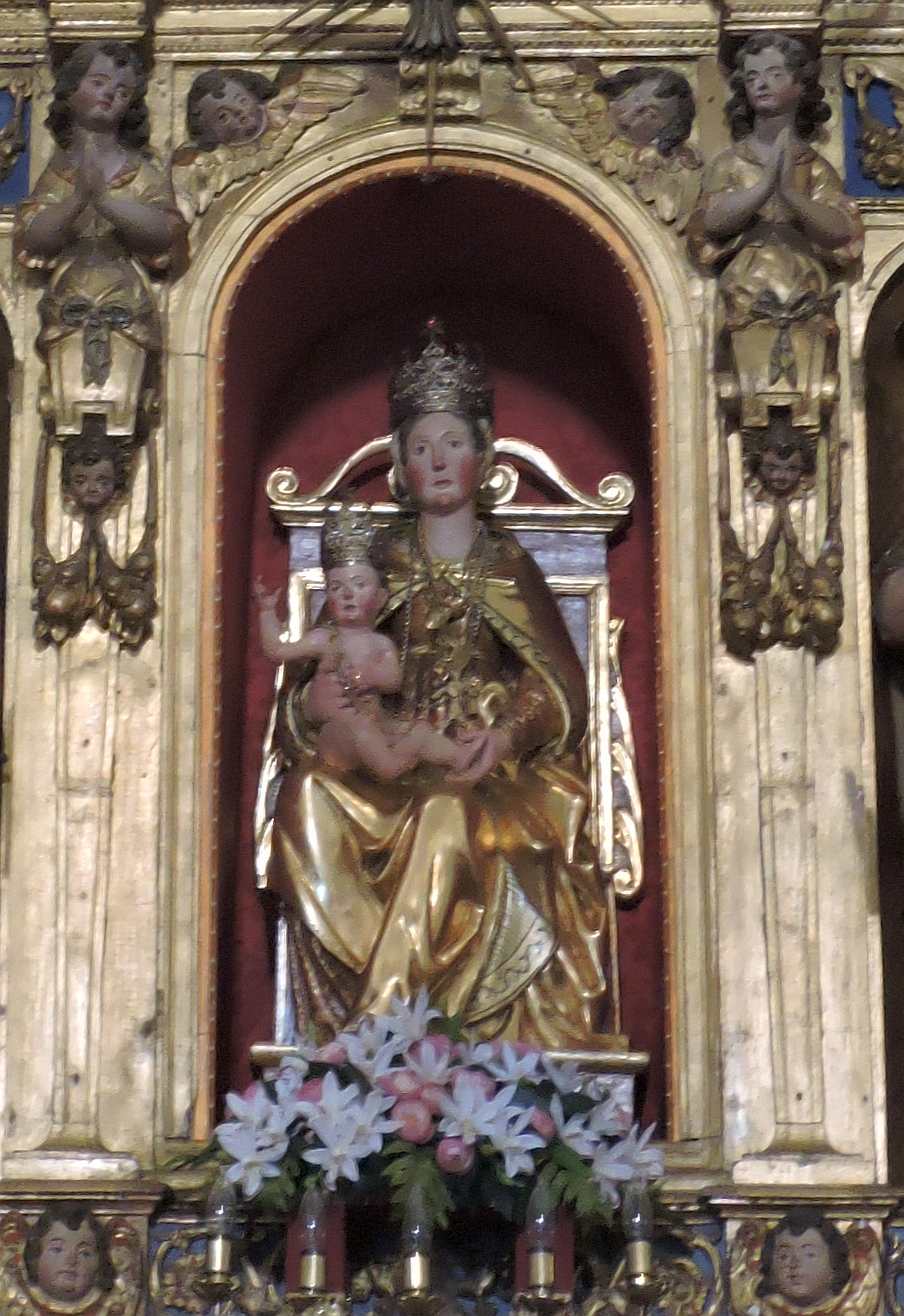
Madonna's wooden statue

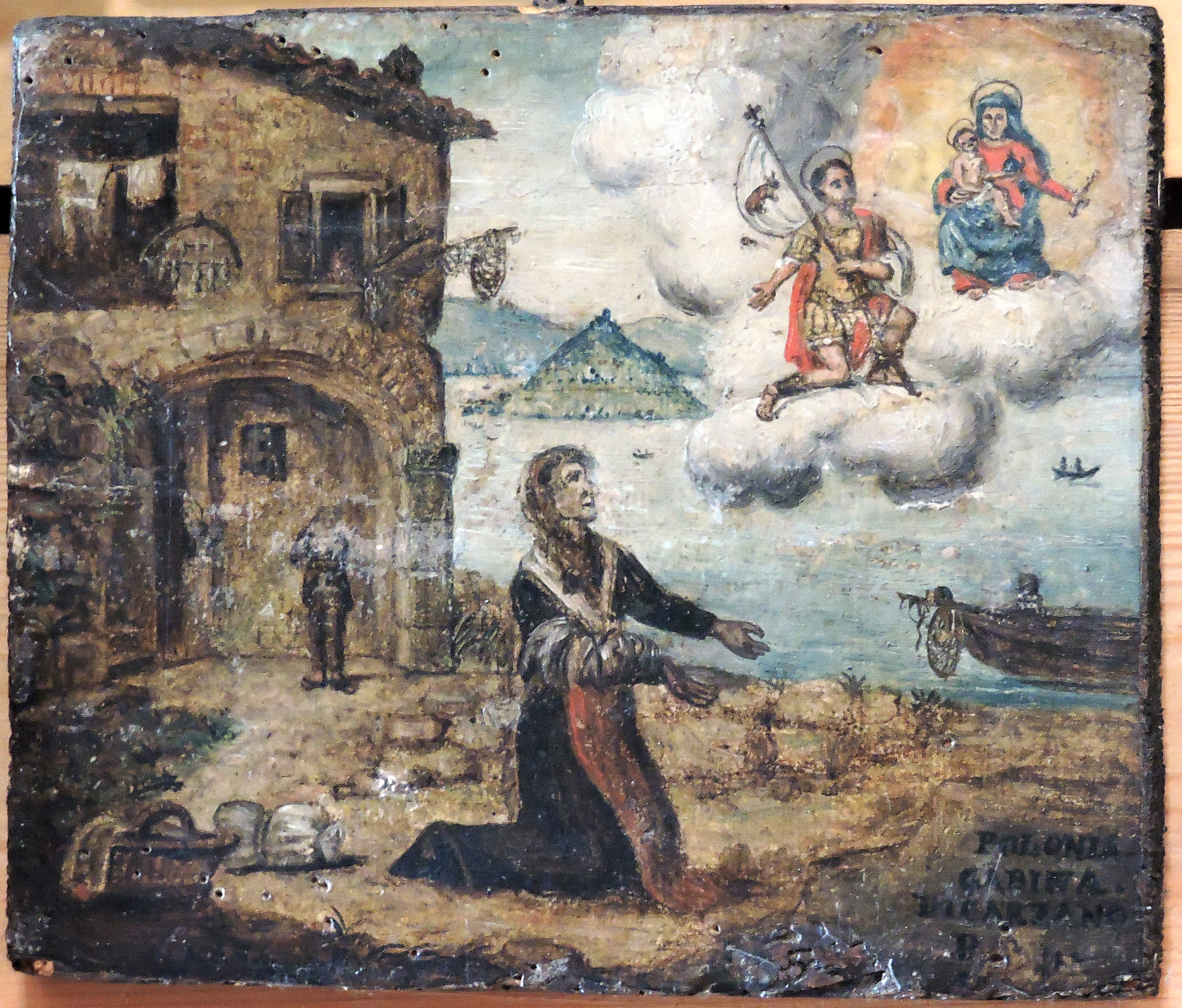
Ex-voto tablet
