= Oldofredi =

Italian noble family from Brescia active from the Middle Ages

- Country: Duchy of Milan; Republic of Venice; Kingdom of Lombardy–Venetia; Kingdom of Italy (1861–1946)
- Founded: 12th century
- Founder: Oldofredo
- Titles: Marquis of Iseo and the Riviera; Count of Iseo; Count; Brescian patrician Noble
- Branches: Oldofredi Tadini

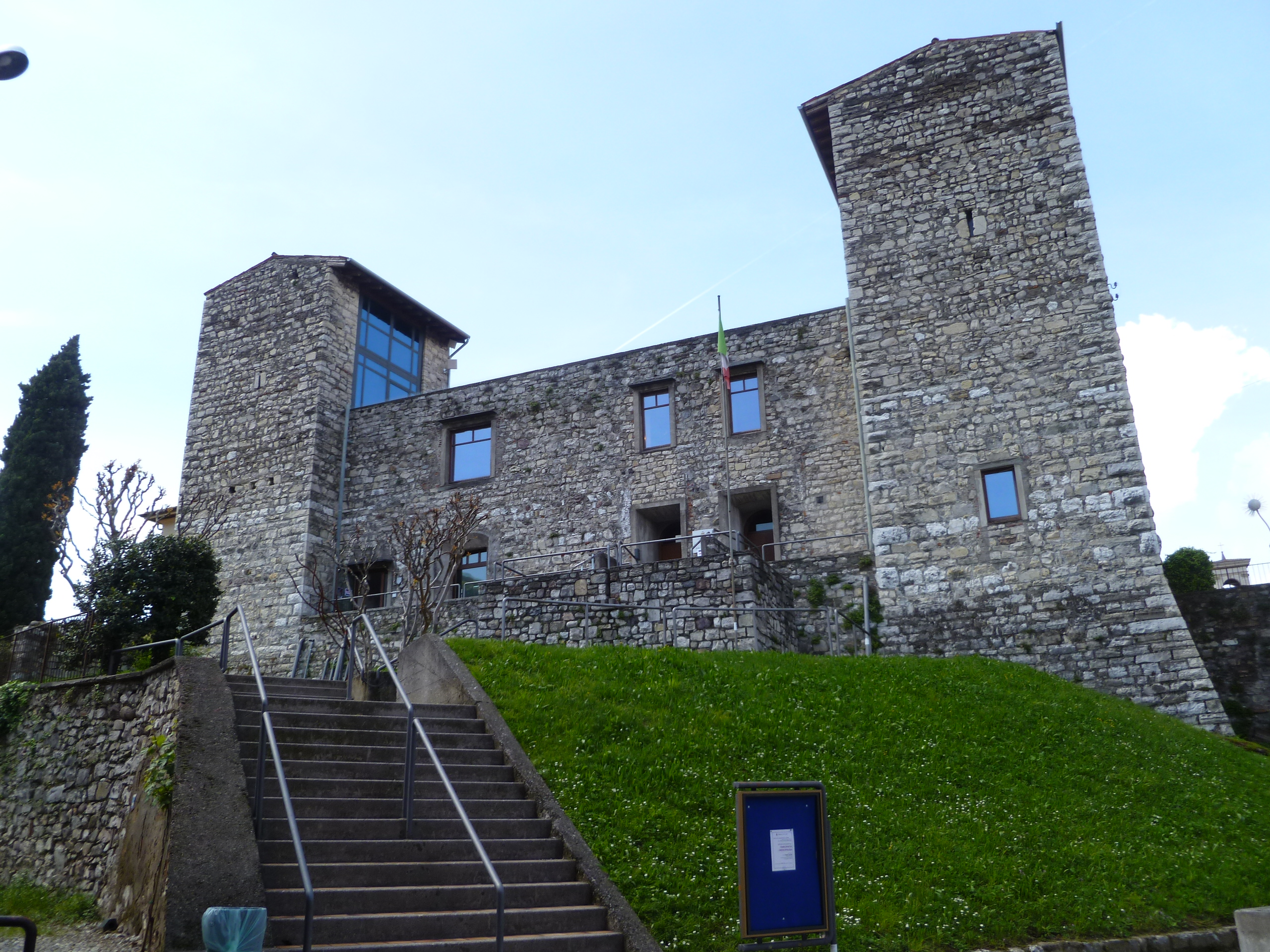
Iseo, Oldofredi Castle

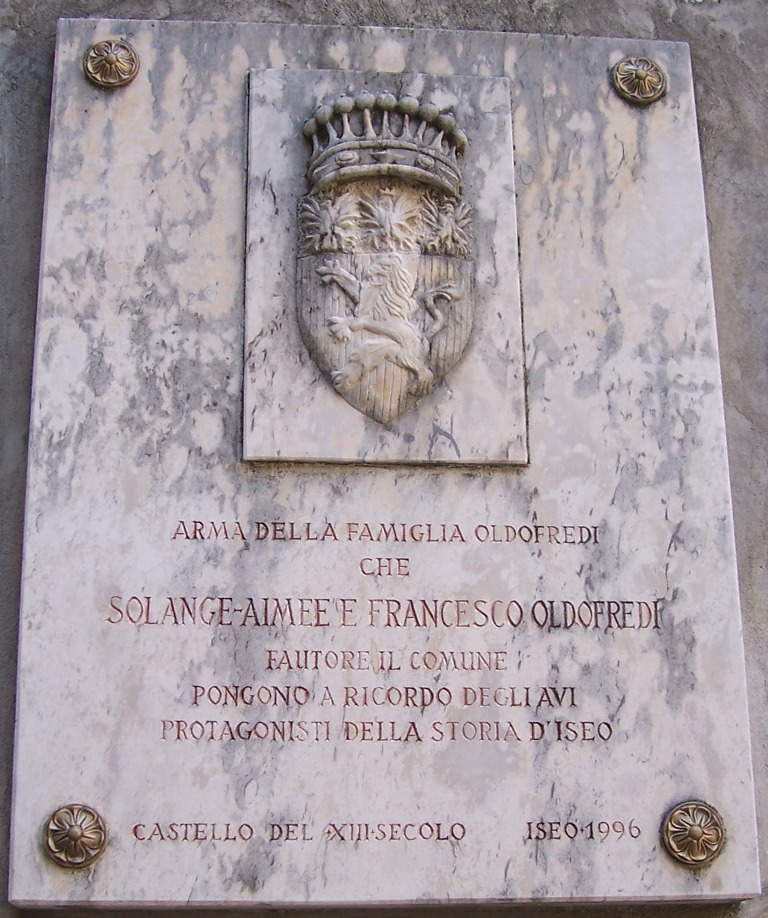
The Oldofredi coat of arms in Iseo

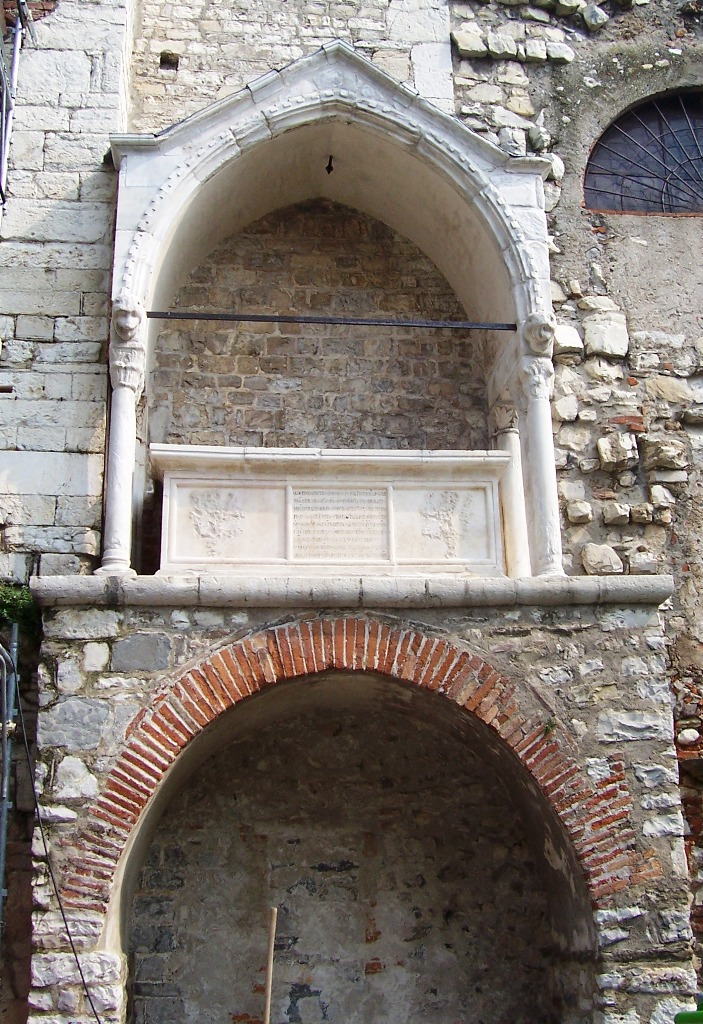
Mausoleum of Giacomo Oldofredi at the Pieve di Sant'Andrea in Iseo

The Oldofredi were an Italian noble family from Brescia, related to Pandolfo III Malatesta and originally from Manerbio. In the 13th century, the family rose to prominence in the Franciacorta area and around Lake Iseo, where they also owned a castle at Peschiera Maraglio on the island of Monte Isola. From this possession derived the titles da Ysé or Isei. They were Ghibellines and aligned with Milan, firmly opposed to Venetian rule.

The probable founder of the family was Oldofredo (died 1212), feudal lord of the castle of Chiari.

== Coat of arms ==
Gules, a lion rampant argent, also recorded as: Gules, a lion rampant Or, langued Gules and armed Sable; on a chief Or three eagles Sable crowned of the field, placed fesswise.

== History ==
According to Gabriele Rosa, in 1426, after Carmagnola conquered Iseo for the Republic of Venice, local power was transferred to the municipality of Iseo and the Oldofredi were banished. They moved to Cesena, where they continued to claim the title of Counts of Iseo. Nevertheless, in 1497 they hosted Catherine Cornaro, Queen of Cyprus and sister of the podestà of Brescia, at their castle in Peschiera Maraglio.

In 1846, the writer Costanzo Ferrari published the historical novel Tiburga Oldofredi - Scene storiche del secolo XIII, set in the 13th century and centered on two Oldofredi sisters, Tiburga and Imelda.

During the Risorgimento, a descendant, Ercole Oldofredi Tadini, took part in the process of Italian unification, first in the Kingdom of Lombardy–Venetia and later in the Kingdom of Sardinia and the Kingdom of Italy.

== Titles ==
Bearing the title of Count ab immemorabili, the Oldofredi also held the oldest marquisal title in the Brescia area: Marquis of Iseo and the Riviera, granted in 1415 to Giacomo II, known as "il Novello", by Emperor Sigismund of Luxembourg.

== Notable members ==
- Giacomo (12th century), son of Oldofredo, politician
- Giacomo III Oldofredi (1251–1325), lord of Iseo and Franciacorta, Podestà of Milan and military commander for the House of Visconti
- Oldofredo (died 1348), military commander and podestà in several Lombardy cities
- Giovanni, who in 1378, with the support of the Ghibellines of Val Camonica, destroyed Clusone, Roccafino and Cerete
- Giacomino (died c. 1440), associate of Filippo Maria Visconti and his ambassador to Emperor Sigismund; created Marquis of Iseo and its Riviera in 1415 together with his brother Giovanni
- Ercole Oldofredi Tadini (1810–1877), senator of the Kingdom of Italy

== Residences ==
- Villa Oldofredi Tadini, Cuneo
- Oldofredi Castle, Iseo
- Oldofredi Castle, Peschiera Maraglio
- Villa Secco Oldofredi Tadini, Calcio, Lombardy

== See also ==
- Iseo, Lombardy
- Monte Isola
- Lake Iseo
- Calcio, Lombardy

== Bibliography ==
- Zani, Attilio Alfredo (2015). "Da Iseo poi Oldofredi". In Luca Giarelli (ed.). I Signori delle Alpi. Famiglie e poteri tra le montagne d'Europa [The Lords of the Alps. Families and powers among the mountains of Europe] (in Italian). ISBN 978-8893218924.
- Ferrari, Costanzo (2008) [1847]. Flavio Guarneri (ed.). Tiburga Oldofredi - Scene storiche del secolo XIII [Tiburga Oldofredi – Historical scenes of the 13th century] (in Italian). Sardini. p. 418. ISBN 978-88-7506-182-1.
- Piovanelli, Giancarlo (1981). Casate bresciane nella storia e nell'arte del medioevo [Brescian families in the history and art of the Middle Ages] (in Italian).
