= The Floating Piers =

Artwork by Christo and Jeanne-Claude on Lake Iseo, Italy

Coordinates: 45°41′46″N 10°05′48″E

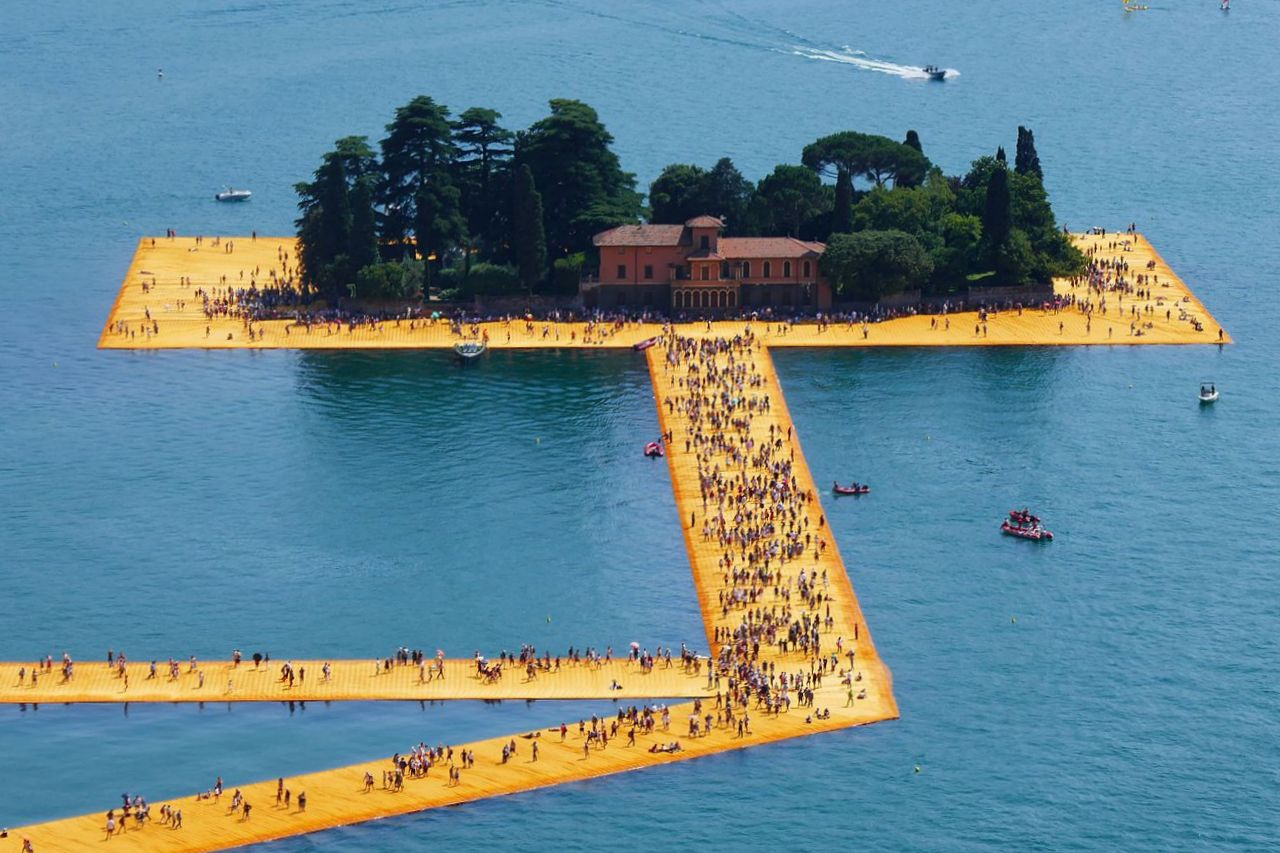
- Artist: Christo and Jeanne-Claude
- Completion date: 3 July 2016
- Type: Site-specific art
- Condition: Dismantled
- Location: Sulzano and Monte Isola, Brescia, Lombardy
- Website: The Floating Piers

The Floating Piers was a temporary, site-specific work of art by Christo and Jeanne-Claude, consisting of 70,000 square meters of yellow fabric, carried by a modular floating dock system of 226,000 high-density polyethylene cubes installed in 2016 at Lake Iseo near Brescia, Italy. The fabric created a walkable surface between Sulzano, Monte Isola and the island of San Paolo.

== Origins and development ==
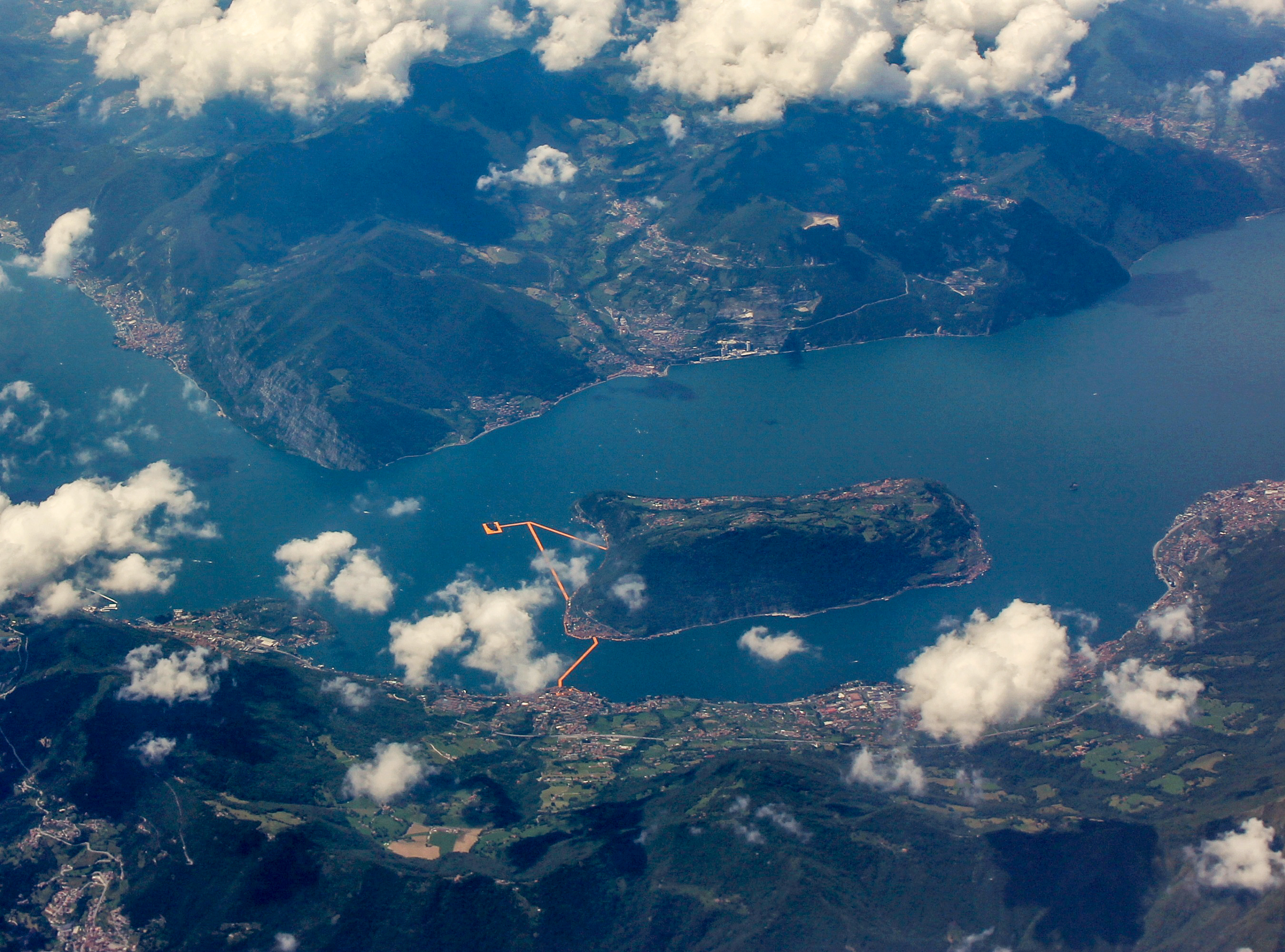
Aerial view of the project on Lake Iseo

Christo and Jeanne-Claude began conceptualizing of The Floating Piers in 1970. Their initial site was Rio de la Plata between Argentina and Uruguay. The couple also considered Tokyo Bay as a location before moving on to other projects.

In late 2013, Christo settled on Lake Iseo as the location for The Floating Piers and dedicated the next 22 months to realizing the project. It was the first major project he undertook after the death of his partner and collaborator Jeanne-Claude.

The project was estimated to cost $11 million, but was later reported at closer to $17 million. The funds were raised by Christo himself through sales of his project sketches and original art. Permits took less than a year.

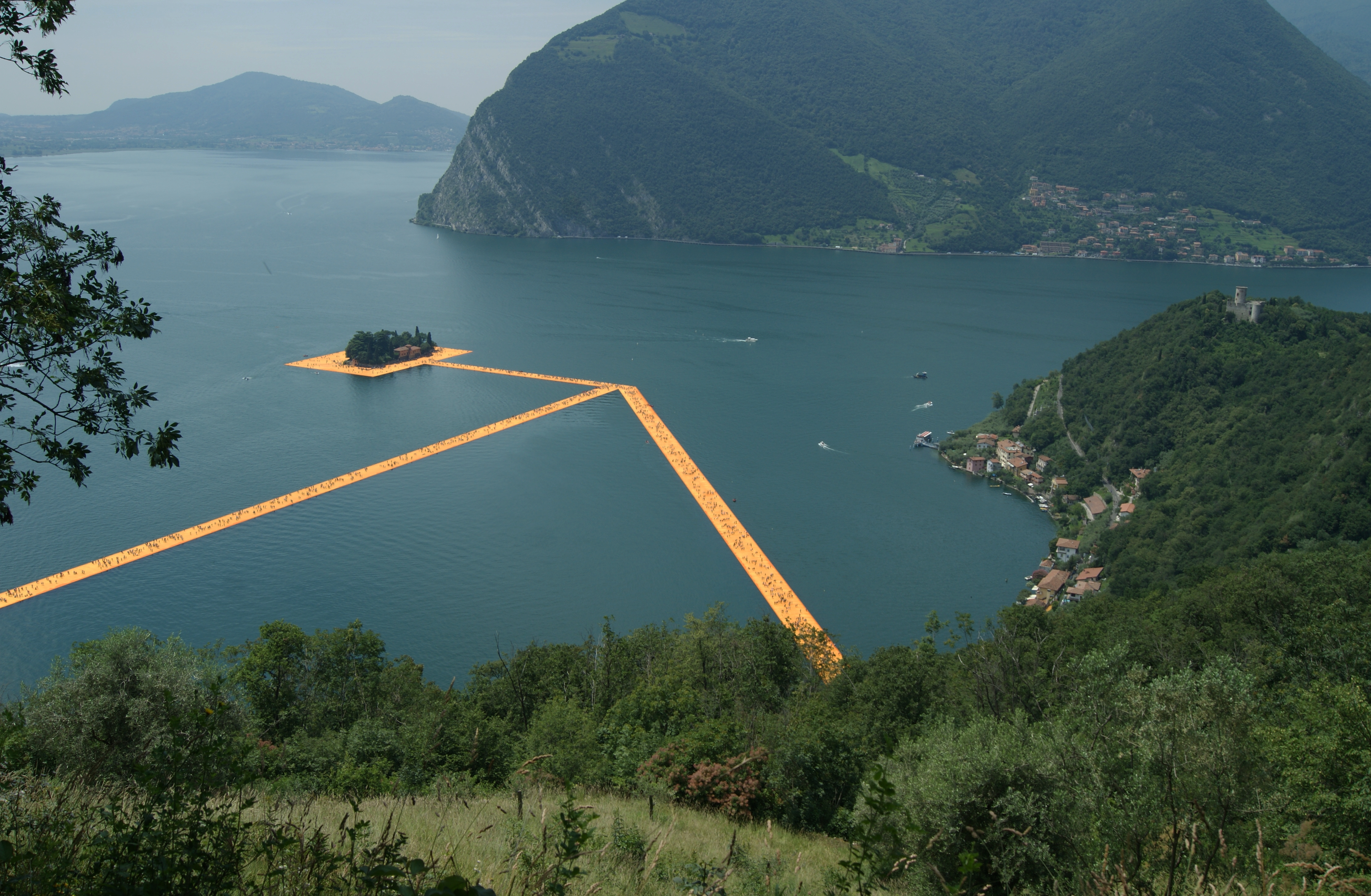
Isola di San Paolo seen from the top of Monte Isola

The physical installation of the piers was handled by Deep Dive Systems, a company based in Bulgaria. They installed about 220 six-ton anchors in the lake floor at depths of up to 92 meters, over a period of three months. 226,000 cubes were then attached to those anchors, and covered by 70,000 square meters of nylon fabric. Over 600 workers were involved in the installation. Traffic planning required a 175-page document and cost €100,000 to produce.

The fabric was cut and confectioned by the company geo - Die Luftwerker e.K. located in Lübeck. This company was also involved in the 3D measurement and installation.

== Opening ==
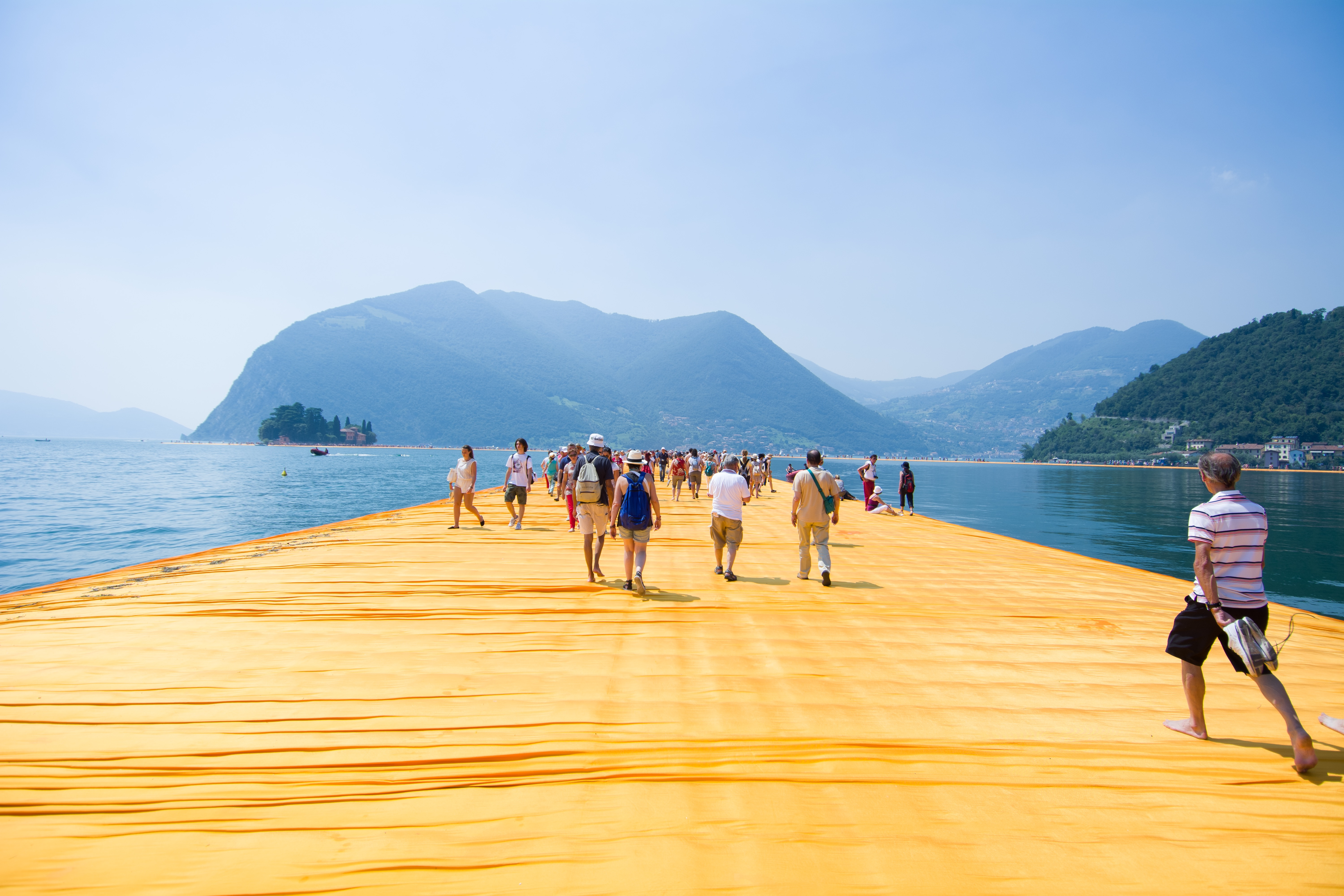
Visitors passing over Lake Iseo

On 18 June 2016, the saffron-colored walkway opened to the public. 270,000 people visited the free installation in its first five days. Due to the unexpectedly large crowds, organizers began closing the installation from midnight to 6 a.m. each day to allow for cleaning. On 22 June 2016, the large crowds caused some chaos at the main train station in nearby Brescia.

== Closing ==
On 3 July 2016, the work closed to the public. Local officials estimated that it had attracted 1.2 million visitors, or an average of 72,000 per day, over its 16-day run. Police estimates were even higher, at 100,000 visitors per day. Dismantling of the project began in the early morning of 4 July 2016.
