= Fenaroli =

Fenaroli is an Italian surname. Notable people with the surname include:

- Fedele Fenaroli (1730–1818), Italian composer
- Giuseppe Fenaroli Avogadro (1760–1825), Italian politician
- Luigi Fenaroli (1899–1980), Italian botanist and agronomist
