= Iseo, Lombardy =

Iseo
- Comune
- Comune di Iseo
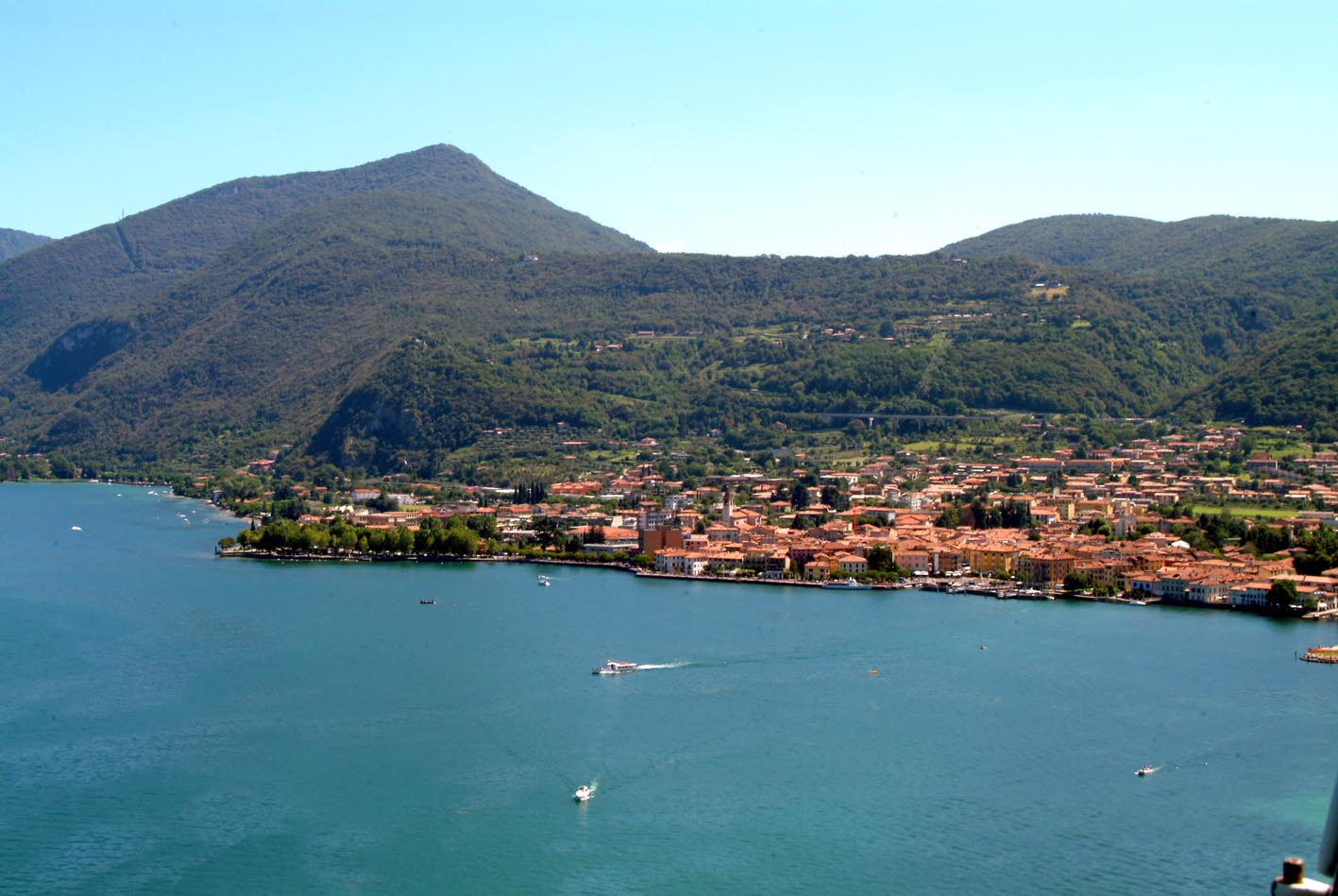
- Iseo

- Location within Italy Location within Lombardy
- Coordinates: 45°39′N 10°3′E
- Country: Italy
- Region: Lombardy
- Province: Brescia (BS)
- Frazioni: Covelo, Pilzone, Clusane

Government
  - Mayor: Riccardo Venchiarutti

Area
  - Total: 25 km^{2} (9.7 sq mi)
- Elevation: 186 m (610 ft)

Population (September 2025)
  - Total: 8,964
  - Density: 360/km^{2} (930/sq mi)
- Demonym: Iseani
- Time zone: UTC+1 (CET)
  - Summer (DST): UTC+2 (CEST)
- Postal code: 25049
- Dialing code: 030
- Patron saint: St. Vigilius of Brescia
- Saint day: 26 September
- Website: Official website

Iseo (Brescian: Izé) is a town and comune in the province of Brescia, in Lombardy, Italy. As of September 2025, it has a population of 8,964.

Situated on the southeastern shore of Lake Iseo, and surrounded by mountains, hills and wetlands, Iseo is an important tourist destination. It is also part of the renowned wine region of Franciacorta. Located about twenty kilometers northwest of the provincial capital Brescia, it is bounded by the communes of Provaglio d'Iseo, Sulzano, Polaveno and Paratico.

Iseo has the first monument ever built for Giuseppe Garibaldi, erected in 1883.

== Main sights ==
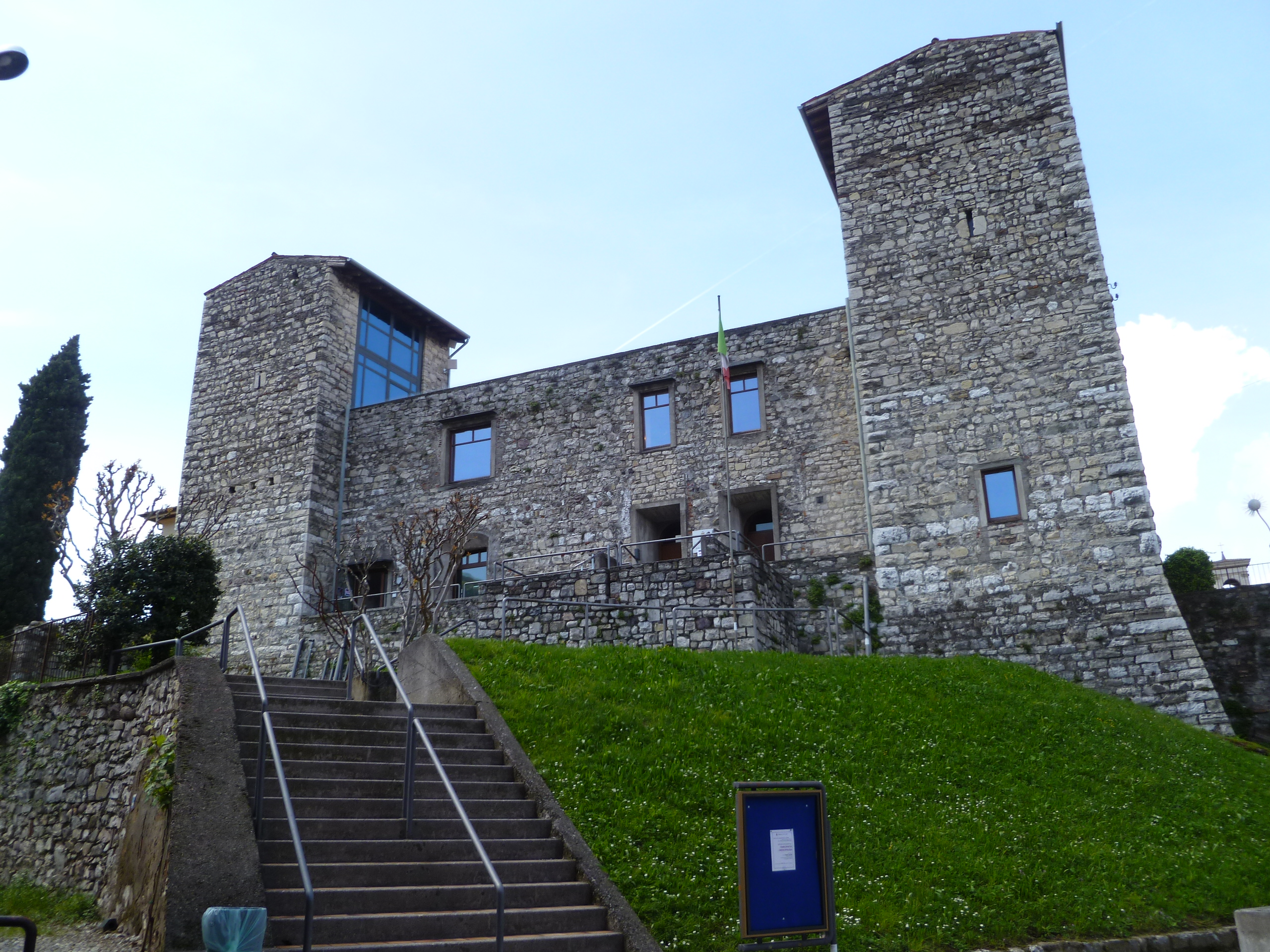
The Oldofredi castle.

- Oldofredi Castle, built between the end of the 11th century and the beginning of the 12th century, on the site of the Torrazzo, a rock at the edge of the city. It is one of the best preserved fortified complexes of early medieval military history. This fortress has square corner towers, screened by quadrangular crossbars on an inclined base. It was named after the Ghibelline Oldofredi family from Iseo. The large tower of the southern wing is the eldest part. It has a square base of 10 metres, a height of 12 metres. Its walls are 2 metres thick. The castle was set afire by the troops of Frederick Barbarossa during his Italian war in the mid-12th century. It was restored by Giacomo Oldofredi in 1161. During the 13th and 14th century, a rectangular castle was added to the fortified building. The castle was then surrounded by a deep moat, carved out of the solid rock. In the 14th century the castle belonged to the Scaliger family of Verona. The castle lost much of its importance when the political control of the Republic of Venice became stronger. It was then bought by the Celeri family. Its upkeep became so expensive that in 1586 the castle was transformed into a monastery for Franciscan friars. The frescoes on some walls of the building date from the 17th-18th centuries. The friars were forced to leave the building in 1797 during the Napoleonic occupation. It became a private property and changed into a block of flats (some are still inhabited) and a spinning mill. The building was bought by the municipality of Iseo and restored in the 1960s. It is now used as a public library, a war museum and can be used for civil wedding services.
- Sanctuary of Our Lady of the Snow (Santuario Madonna della Neve) was built on the remains of the ancient church of St. Stephen, for popular devotion during the plague. On 15 April 1655 the foundation stone was laid for a new sanctuary after the miraculous healing of a man who crawled on all fours and suddenly could walk normally. He ascribed it his prayer to the fresco of the Holy Family in an aedicule on the wall surrounding the ancient church.

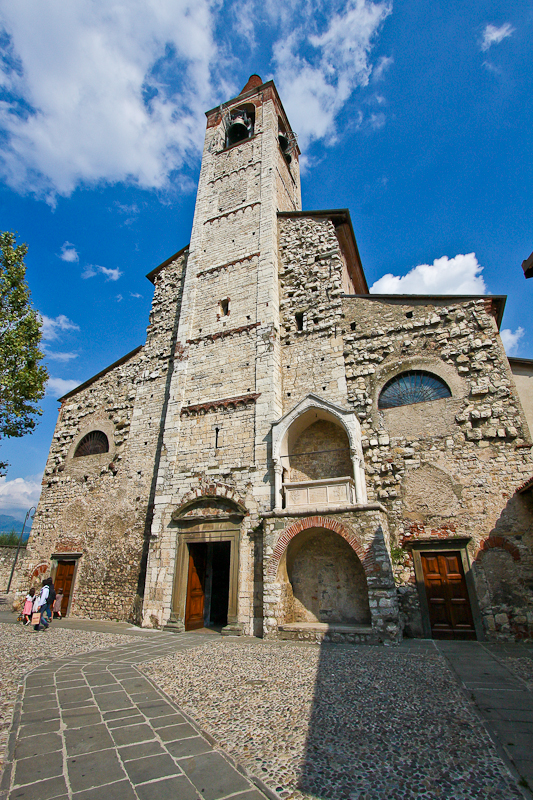
Pieve of St. Andrew.

- Pieve di St. Andrea. It is believed that the church was founded in the 6th century by Bishop San Vigilio on the site of a Roman temple. It was subsequently reconstructed in the 12th century in Lombard style. Over the centuries the parish church was renovated several times. At the beginning of the 19th century Rodolfo Vantini renovated the interior in neo-classical style. The church is characterised by an unusual Romanesque bell tower incorporated into the centre of the façade. The church is so ornate and is regularly used for weddings. It is just a couple of minutes walk to the lake shore and also Garibaldi square, with the Garibaldi monument and "Vantini" Palace, the Town Hall. On the right-hand side of the portal there is a 14th-century Gothic arch by Giacomo Oldofredi. Inside there are frescoes by Angelo Inganni and one St Michael Archangel by Francesco Hayez. In the presbytery there are frescoes by Ponziano Loverini and Giuseppe Teosa.
- Garibaldi square, with the Garibaldi monument and "Vantini Palace", the Town Hall.

== Transportation ==
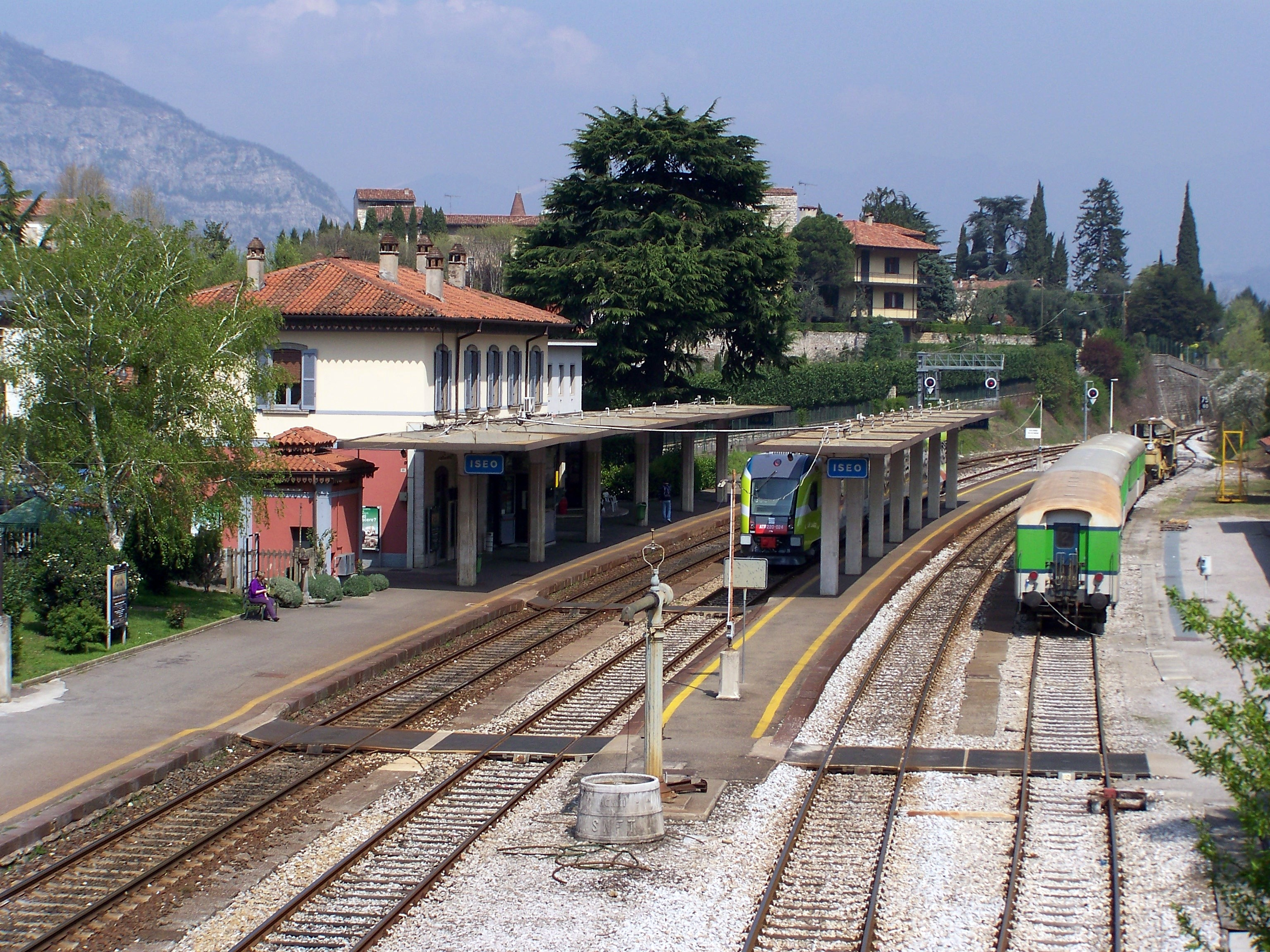
Iseo railway station.

Iseo is served by Iseo railway station, located on the Brescia–Iseo–Edolo railway, a regional railway line that connects the city of Brescia with the town of Edolo in the Val Camonica. Situated in the southeastern part of the town, the railway station of Iseo is served by regional trains to Brescia, Rovato and Edolo, operated by the regional railway company Trenord.

Iseo is also connected to several other towns on Lake Iseo by ferry.

== Twin towns ==
Iseo is twinned with:

- Tamsweg, Austria
