= Sale Marasino =

Sale Marasino Sale Marazì
- Comune
- Comune di Sale Marasino
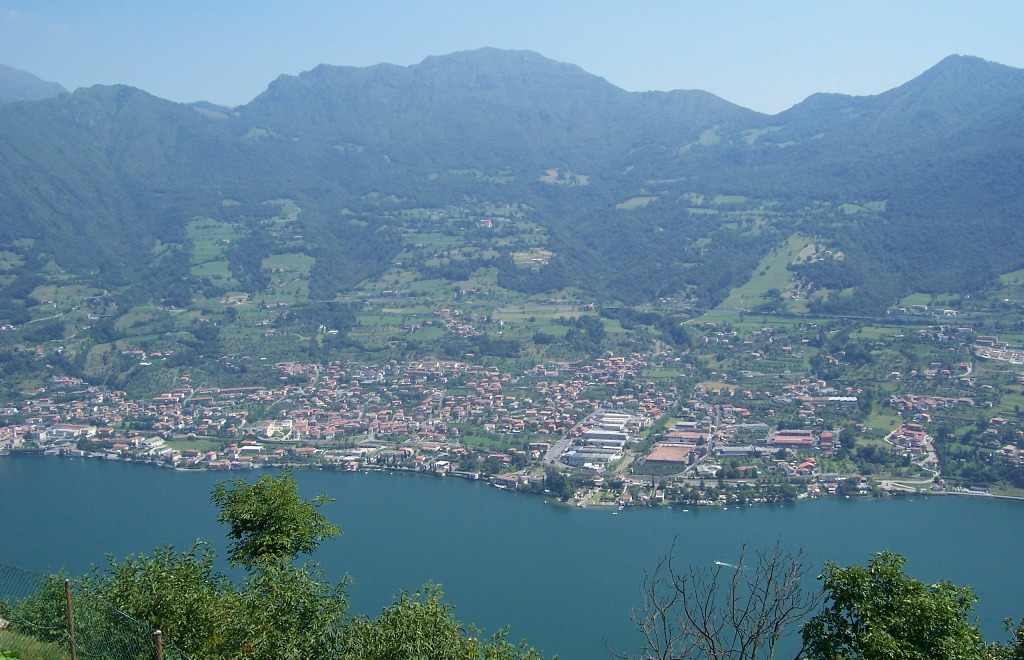
- Sale Marasino

- Location within Italy Location within Lombardy
- Coordinates: 45°43′N 10°7′E
- Country: Italy
- Region: Lombardy
- Province: Brescia (BS)

Government
  - Mayor: Marisa Zanotti

Area
  - Total: 16.59 km^{2} (6.41 sq mi)

Population (31 July 2021)
  - Total: 3,305
  - Density: 199.2/km^{2} (516.0/sq mi)
- Demonym: Salesi
- Time zone: UTC+1 (CET)
  - Summer (DST): UTC+2 (CEST)
- Postal code: 25057
- Dialing code: 030
- ISTAT code: 017169
- Website: Official website

Sale Marasino (Brescian: Sale Marazì) is a comune in the province of Brescia, Lombardy, northern Italy. It is situated on the east shore of Lake Iseo.
