= Lake Iseo =

Lake in Lombardy, Italy

- Lago d'Iseo (Italian); Sebino (Italian); Lach d'Izé (Lombard)
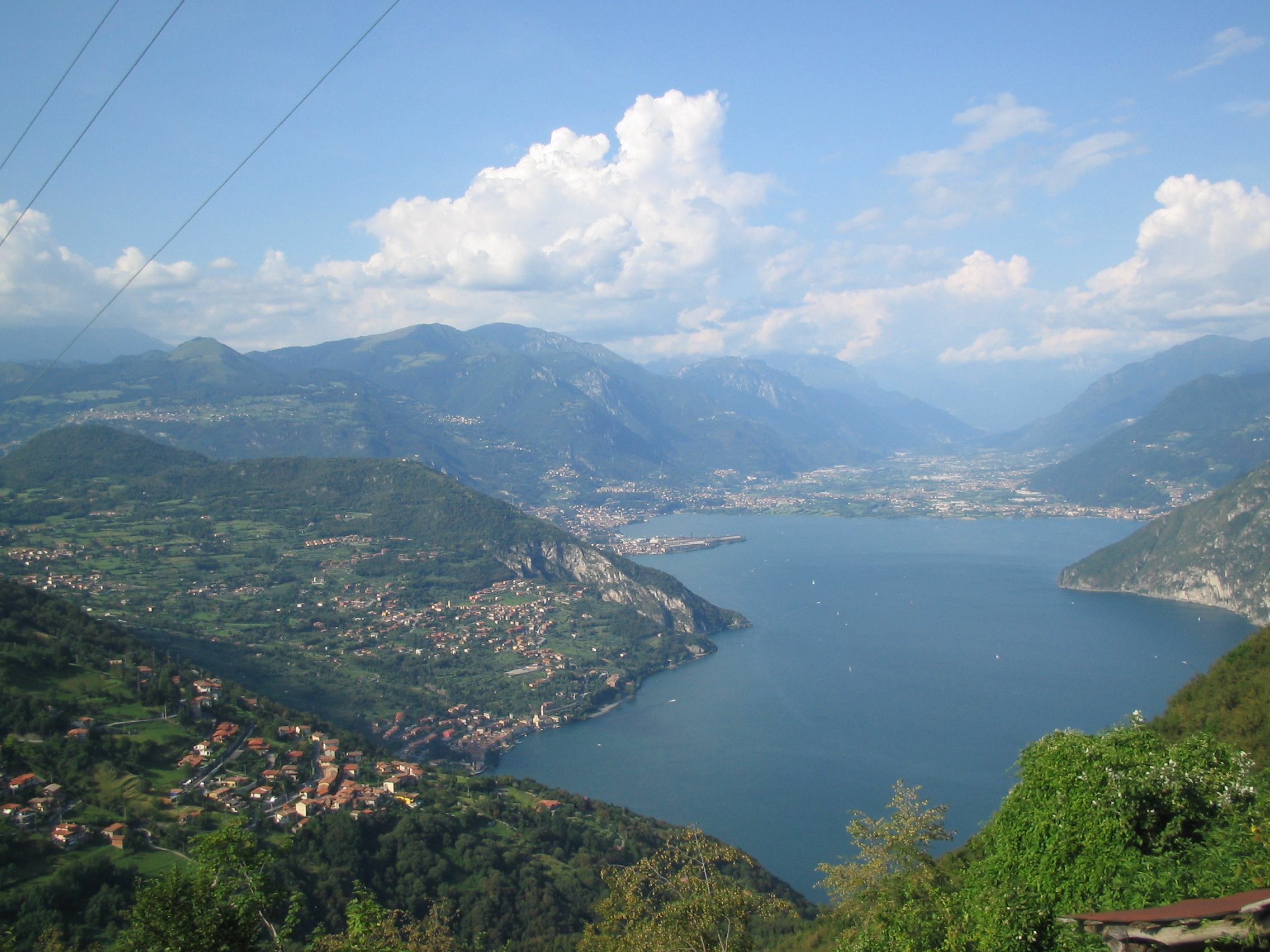
- Lake Iseo

- Location within Lombardy

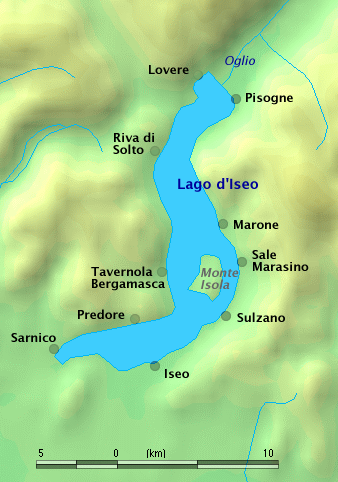
- map
- Location: Lombardy
- Coordinates: 45°43′N 10°05′E
- Primary inflows: Oglio
- Primary outflows: Oglio
- Catchment area: 1,777 km^{2} (686 sq mi)
- Basin countries: Italy
- Max. length: 25 km (16 mi)
- Surface area: 65.3 km^{2} (25.2 sq mi)
- Average depth: 124 m (407 ft)
- Max. depth: 251 m (823 ft)
- Water volume: 8.1 km^{3} (1.9 cu mi)
- Residence time: 8.8 years
- Surface elevation: 185 m (607 ft)
- Islands: Montisola, Loreto, San Paolo
- Settlements: see article

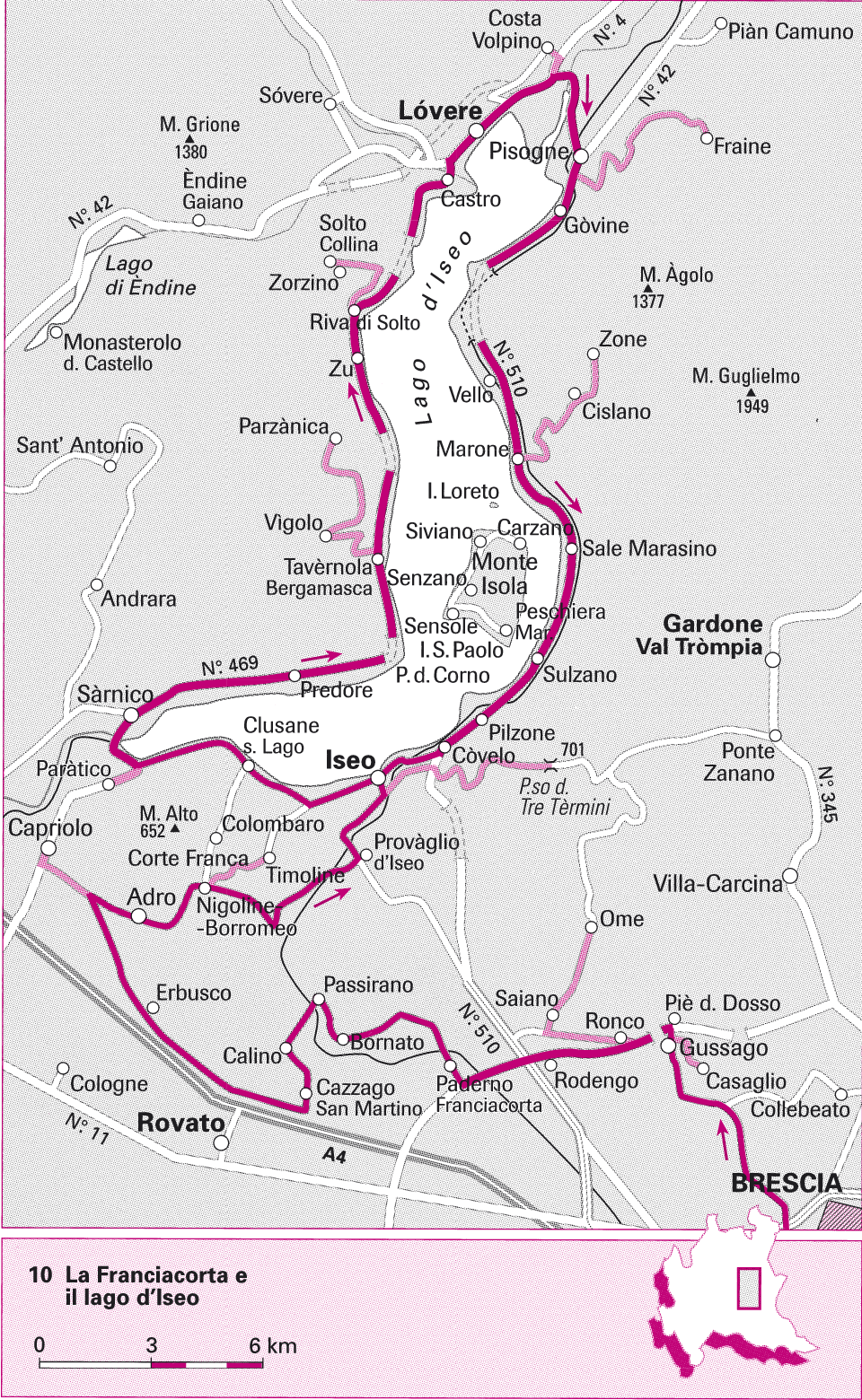
Map of Franciacorta and Lake Iseo

Lake Iseo or Iseo lake (US: /iːˈzeɪoʊ/ ee-ZAY-oh; Italian: Lago d'Iseo Italian pronunciation: [ˈlaːɡo diˈzɛːo]; Eastern Lombard: Lach d'Izé), also known as Sebino (Italian: [seˈbiːno]; Latin: Sebinus), is the fourth largest lake in Lombardy, Italy, fed by the Oglio River.

It is in the north of the country in the Val Camonica area, near the cities of Brescia and Bergamo. The lake is almost equally divided between the provinces of Bergamo and Brescia. Northern Italy is known for its heavily industrialised towns, and in between, there are several natural lakes. Lake Iseo retains its natural environment, with its lush green mountains surrounding the crystal-clear lake.

There are several medieval towns around the lake, the largest being Iseo and Sarnico. A notable tourism sector has emerged. A road has been carved into the side of the mountains that circumnavigates the entire lake. In the middle of the lake, there are the Montisola island, Loreto isle, and San Paolo isle (which comprise the Monte Isola municipality). There is easy access via the regularly running lake ferries.

The Floating Piers, an art installation by Christo and Jeanne-Claude (made of a series of walkways), was open to the public at Lake Iseo for 16 days in June and July 2016.

Since 2018, the northern portion of the lake (called Alto Sebino) has been part of the UNESCO World Biosphere Reserve of "Valle Camonica - Alto Sebino".

Valle Camonica - Alto Sebino Biosphere Reserve
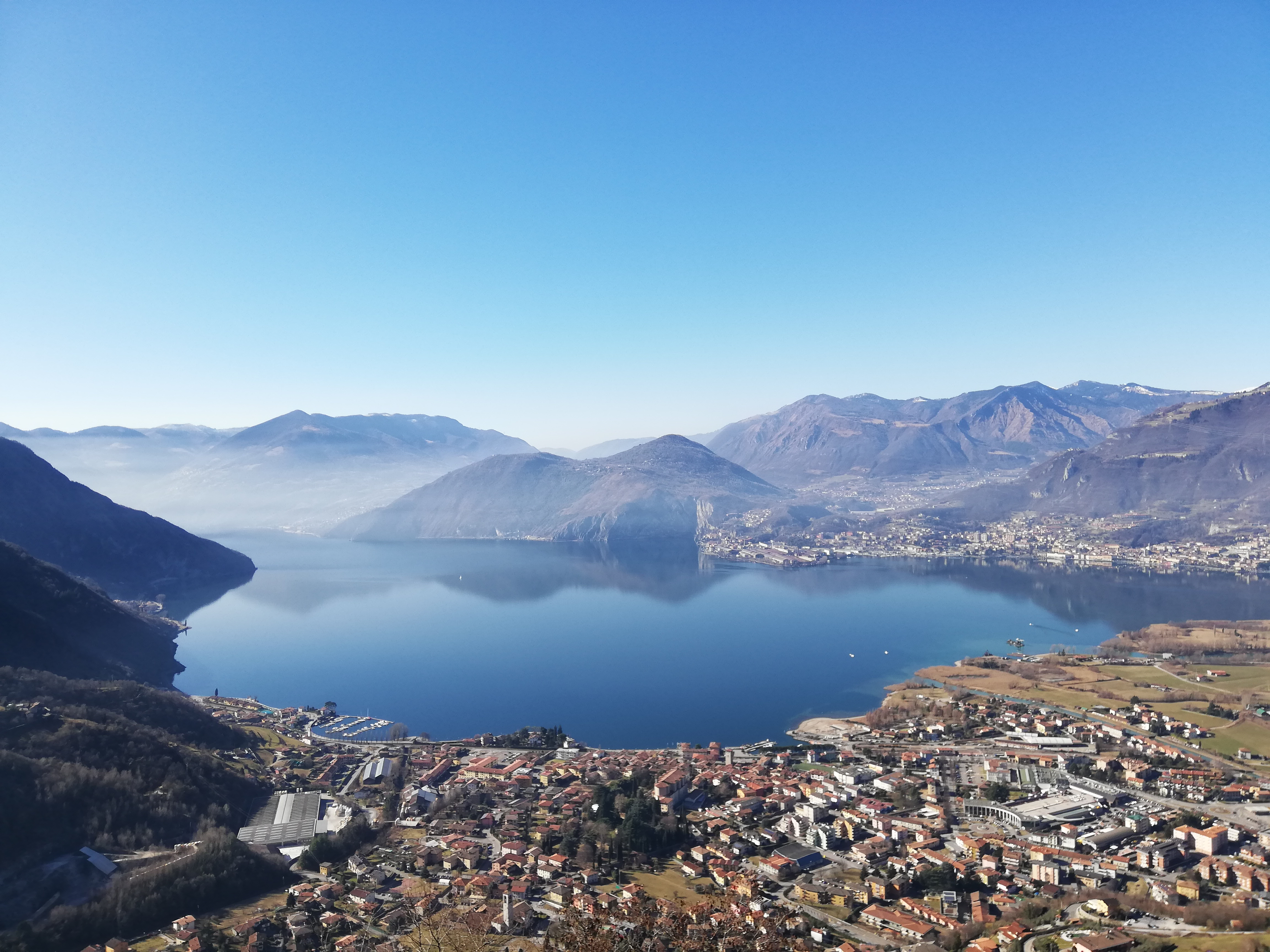
- View of Alto Sebino from Grignaghe
- Interactive map of Valle Camonica - Alto Sebino Biosphere Reserve
- Location: Lombardy, Italy
- Area: 1,355.65 km^{2} (523.42 sq mi)
- Established: 2018
- Governing body: Comunità Montana di Valle Camonica
- Website: http://www.cmvallecamonica.bs.it

== Hydrography ==
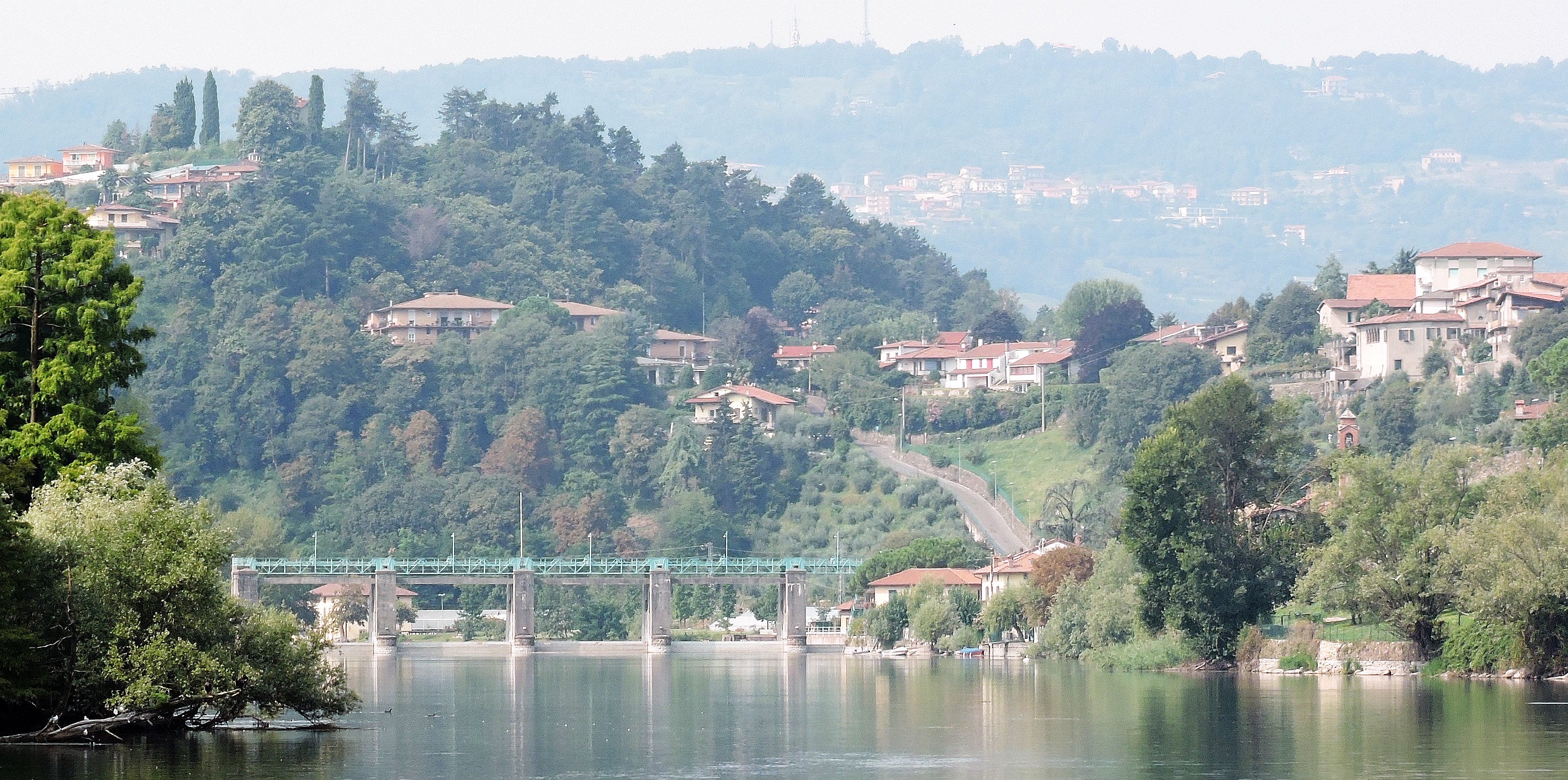
The Sarnico Dam

The level of the lake is regulated by the Sarnico Dam, built in 1933 in Fosio. The work, built in concrete and steel, is managed by the Consorzio dell'Oglio, which divides the water withdrawn between irrigation uses and hydroelectric uses.

=== Tributaries ===
In addition to the Oglio River, the lake is fed by the following creeks and streams:

1. Bergamo shore:
  - Borlezza,
  - Rino di Vigolo,
  - Rino di Predore;
2. Brescia shore:
  - Bagnadore,
  - Calchere,
  - Cortelo,
  - Opolo.

== Settlements ==
Around the shore of the lake are some small towns:

The Comunes of Lake Iseo
Brescia	Bergamo
Iseo; Sulzano; Marone; Sale Marasino; Pisogne; Paratico; Montisola	Sarnico; Predore; Tavernola Bergamasca; Riva di Solto; Castro; Lovere; Costa Volpino
A view of the town of Iseo, in the southern part of the lake

Two smaller islands, Loreto and St. Paul, are privately owned.

== See also ==
- Italian Lakes
- List of lakes of Italy
