= Sulzano =

Sulzano Sülsà (Lombard)
- Comune
- Comune di Sulzano
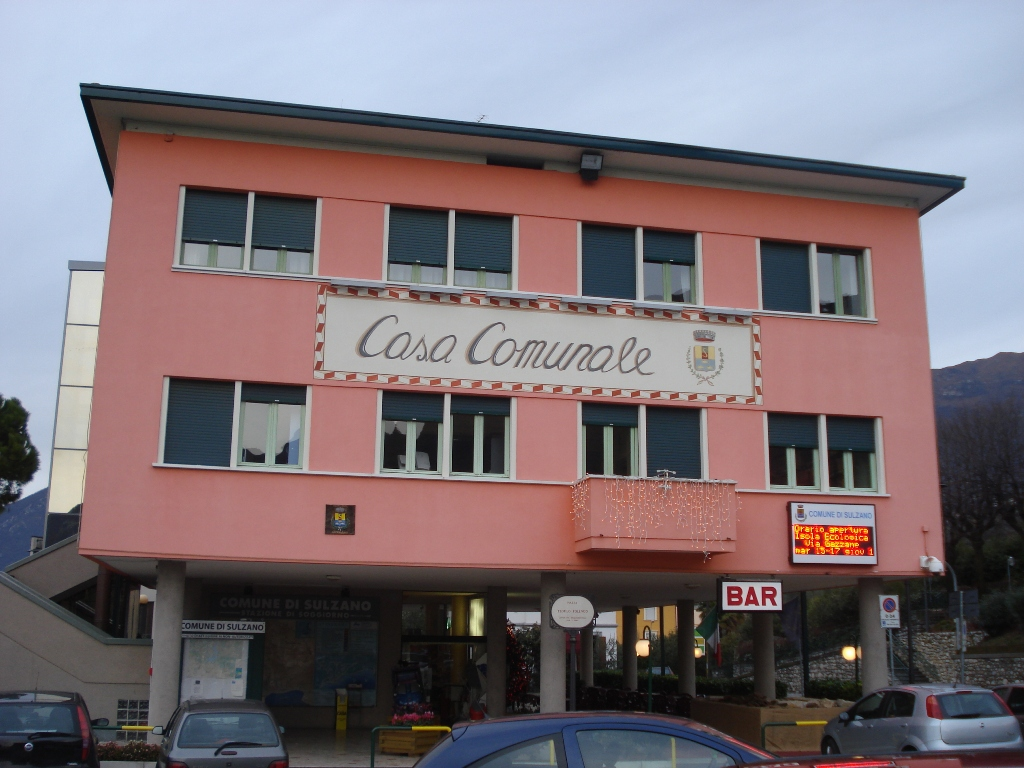
- Town hall

- Location within Italy Location within Lombardy
- Coordinates: 45°41′N 10°6′E
- Country: Italy
- Region: Lombardy
- Province: Brescia (BS)
- Frazioni: Martignago, Tassano

Area
  - Total: 10 km^{2} (3.9 sq mi)
- Elevation: 190 m (620 ft)

Population (2011)
  - Total: 1,956
  - Density: 200/km^{2} (510/sq mi)
- Time zone: UTC+1 (CET)
  - Summer (DST): UTC+2 (CEST)
- Postal code: 25058
- Dialing code: 030
- ISTAT code: 017182
- Website: Official website

Sulzano (Brescian: Sülsà) is a comune in the province of Brescia, in Lombardy. It is situated on the east shore of Lake Iseo. Its coat of arms shows three golden fishes on blue in the lower half, and two yellow vertical bars in the top half, flanking a letter S on blue and red.
