= List of municipalities of Lombardy =

Location of Lombardy within Italy

Provinces of Lombardy

The following is a list of the municipalities (comuni) of the region of Lombardy in Italy.

There are 1,501 municipalities in Lombardy as of 2026:

- 243 in the Province of Bergamo
- 205 in the Province of Brescia
- 147 in the Province of Como
- 113 in the Province of Cremona
- 84 in the Province of Lecco
- 60 in the Province of Lodi
- 64 in the Province of Mantua
- 133 in the Metropolitan City of Milan
- 55 in the Province of Monza and Brianza
- 184 in the Province of Pavia
- 77 in the Province of Sondrio
- 136 in the Province of Varese

== List ==
Municipality	Province	Population (2026)	Area (km²)	Density
Abbadia Cerreto	Lodi	280	6.20	45.2
Abbadia Lariana	Lecco	3,138	16.67	188.2
Abbiategrasso	Milan	32,793	47.78	686.3
Acquafredda	Brescia	1,549	9.55	162.2
Acquanegra Cremonese	Cremona	1,167	9.22	126.6
Acquanegra sul Chiese	Mantua	2,722	28.01	97.2
Adrara San Martino	Bergamo	2,213	12.61	175.5
Adrara San Rocco	Bergamo	816	9.23	88.4
Adro	Brescia	7,196	14.29	503.6
Agnadello	Cremona	3,963	12.08	328.1
Agnosine	Brescia	1,646	13.55	121.5
Agra	Varese	380	2.80	135.7
Agrate Brianza	Monza and Brianza	15,891	11.22	1,416.3
Aicurzio	Monza and Brianza	2,072	2.47	838.9
Airuno	Lecco	2,928	4.29	682.5
Alagna	Pavia	810	8.34	97.1
Albairate	Milan	4,719	14.98	315.0
Albano Sant'Alessandro	Bergamo	8,342	5.35	1,559.3
Albaredo per San Marco	Sondrio	278	18.96	14.7
Albavilla	Como	6,348	10.38	611.6
Albese con Cassano	Como	4,277	7.95	538.0
Albiate	Monza and Brianza	6,720	2.86	2,349.7
Albino	Bergamo	17,588	31.81	552.9
Albiolo	Como	2,800	2.84	985.9
Albizzate	Varese	5,200	3.88	1,340.2
Albonese	Pavia	561	4.33	129.6
Albosaggia	Sondrio	3,006	34.35	87.5
Albuzzano	Pavia	3,667	15.45	237.3
Alfianello	Brescia	2,307	13.75	167.8
Algua	Bergamo	698	8.32	83.9
Almè	Bergamo	5,483	2.00	2,741.5
Almenno San Bartolomeo	Bergamo	6,630	10.61	624.9
Almenno San Salvatore	Bergamo	5,502	4.73	1,163.2
Alserio	Como	1,417	1.99	712.1
Alta Valle Intelvi	Como	3,186	24.95	127.7
Alzano Lombardo	Bergamo	13,379	13.68	978.0
Alzate Brianza	Como	4,834	7.58	637.7
Ambivere	Bergamo	2,334	3.28	711.6
Andalo Valtellino	Sondrio	601	6.78	88.6
Anfo	Brescia	439	23.83	18.4
Angera	Varese	5,326	17.72	300.6
Angolo Terme	Brescia	2,324	30.56	76.0
Annicco	Cremona	1,980	19.20	103.1
Annone di Brianza	Lecco	2,283	5.98	381.8
Antegnate	Bergamo	3,456	9.73	355.2
Anzano del Parco	Como	1,675	3.25	515.4
Appiano Gentile	Como	7,749	12.81	604.9
Aprica	Sondrio	1,433	20.37	70.3
Arcene	Bergamo	5,112	4.35	1,175.2
Arcisate	Varese	9,859	12.13	812.8
Arconate	Milan	6,871	8.42	816.0
Arcore	Monza and Brianza	17,938	9.25	1,939.2
Ardenno	Sondrio	3,228	17.14	188.3
Ardesio	Bergamo	3,239	54.44	59.5
Arena Po	Pavia	1,530	22.49	68.0
Arese	Milan	19,545	6.56	2,979.4
Argegno	Como	676	4.11	164.5
Arluno	Milan	12,615	12.36	1,020.6
Arosio	Como	5,227	2.58	2,026.0
Arsago Seprio	Varese	4,727	10.51	449.8
Artogne	Brescia	3,714	21.02	176.7
Arzago d'Adda	Bergamo	2,767	9.31	297.2
Asola	Mantua	9,870	73.48	134.3
Assago	Milan	9,348	8.05	1,161.2
Asso	Como	3,555	6.51	546.1
Averara	Bergamo	179	10.69	16.7
Aviatico	Bergamo	593	8.49	69.8
Azzanello	Cremona	631	11.12	56.7
Azzano Mella	Brescia	3,519	10.57	332.9
Azzano San Paolo	Bergamo	7,725	4.29	1,800.7
Azzate	Varese	4,652	4.51	1,031.5
Azzio	Varese	758	2.17	349.3
Azzone	Bergamo	351	17.29	20.3
Badia Pavese	Pavia	408	5.06	80.6
Bagnaria	Pavia	622	16.66	37.3
Bagnatica	Bergamo	4,448	6.55	679.1
Bagnolo Cremasco	Cremona	5,115	10.39	492.3
Bagnolo Mella	Brescia	12,536	31.35	399.9
Bagnolo San Vito	Mantua	5,855	49.20	119.0
Bagolino	Brescia	3,738	109.21	34.2
Ballabio	Lecco	4,181	15.04	278.0
Baranzate	Milan	12,129	2.78	4,362.9
Barasso	Varese	1,681	3.92	428.8
Barbariga	Brescia	2,307	11.34	203.4
Barbata	Bergamo	695	7.98	87.1
Barbianello	Pavia	888	11.71	75.8
Bardello con Malgesso e Bregano	Varese	3,629	7.58	478.8
Bareggio	Milan	17,271	11.38	1,517.7
Barghe	Brescia	1,138	5.49	207.3
Bariano	Bergamo	4,332	7.07	612.7
Barlassina	Monza and Brianza	6,985	2.76	2,530.8
Barni	Como	611	5.72	106.8
Barzago	Lecco	2,407	3.56	676.1
Barzana	Bergamo	2,039	2.07	985.0
Barzanò	Lecco	5,047	3.62	1,394.2
Barzio	Lecco	1,269	21.35	59.4
Bascapè	Pavia	1,825	13.34	136.8
Basiano	Milan	3,645	4.59	794.1
Basiglio	Milan	8,027	8.49	945.5
Bassano Bresciano	Brescia	2,363	9.42	250.8
Bastida Pancarana	Pavia	921	12.50	73.7
Battuda	Pavia	635	7.14	88.9
Bedero Valcuvia	Varese	664	2.56	259.4
Bedizzole	Brescia	12,266	26.44	463.9
Bedulita	Bergamo	712	4.27	166.7
Belgioioso	Pavia	6,439	24.69	260.8
Bellagio	Como	3,509	29.06	120.8
Bellano	Lecco	3,357	22.03	152.4
Bellinzago Lombardo	Milan	3,728	4.59	812.2
Bellusco	Monza and Brianza	7,487	6.54	1,144.8
Bema	Sondrio	117	19.22	6.1
Bene Lario	Como	349	5.59	62.4
Berbenno	Bergamo	2,526	6.14	411.4
Berbenno di Valtellina	Sondrio	4,066	35.60	114.2
Beregazzo con Figliaro	Como	2,825	3.80	743.4
Bereguardo	Pavia	2,856	17.86	159.9
Bergamo	Bergamo	120,629	40.16	3,003.7
Berlingo	Brescia	2,751	4.59	599.3
Bernareggio	Monza and Brianza	11,706	5.93	1,974.0
Bernate Ticino	Milan	2,919	12.16	240.0
Bertonico	Lodi	1,081	20.83	51.9
Berzo Demo	Brescia	1,444	15.46	93.4
Berzo Inferiore	Brescia	2,522	21.92	115.1
Berzo San Fermo	Bergamo	1,456	5.86	248.5
Besana in Brianza	Monza and Brianza	15,503	15.76	983.7
Besano	Varese	2,513	3.43	732.7
Besate	Milan	2,050	12.74	160.9
Besnate	Varese	5,438	7.48	727.0
Besozzo	Varese	8,717	13.95	624.9
Biandronno	Varese	3,190	9.52	335.1
Bianzano	Bergamo	642	6.67	96.3
Bianzone	Sondrio	1,263	17.11	73.8
Biassono	Monza and Brianza	12,430	4.89	2,541.9
Bienno	Brescia	3,756	46.80	80.3
Binago	Como	4,814	7.12	676.1
Binasco	Milan	7,068	3.87	1,826.4
Bione	Brescia	1,319	17.29	76.3
Bisuschio	Varese	4,253	7.03	605.0
Bizzarone	Como	1,789	2.67	670.0
Blello	Bergamo	71	2.20	32.3
Blessagno	Como	313	3.56	87.9
Blevio	Como	1,002	5.47	183.2
Bodio Lomnago	Varese	2,255	4.04	558.2
Boffalora d'Adda	Lodi	1,737	8.13	213.7
Boffalora sopra Ticino	Milan	4,104	7.65	536.5
Bolgare	Bergamo	6,731	8.59	783.6
Bollate	Milan	36,754	13.12	2,801.4
Boltiere	Bergamo	6,185	4.21	1,469.1
Bonate Sopra	Bergamo	10,652	6.15	1,732.0
Bonate Sotto	Bergamo	6,645	6.47	1,027.0
Bonemerse	Cremona	1,434	5.90	243.1
Bordolano	Cremona	602	8.14	74.0
Borgarello	Pavia	2,829	4.84	584.5
Borghetto Lodigiano	Lodi	4,430	23.64	187.4
Borgo di Terzo	Bergamo	1,225	1.83	669.4
Borgo Mantovano	Mantua	5,379	41.17	130.7
Borgo Priolo	Pavia	1,213	28.81	42.1
Borgo San Giacomo	Brescia	5,590	29.53	189.3
Borgo San Giovanni	Lodi	2,444	7.50	325.9
Borgo San Siro	Pavia	961	17.64	54.5
Borgo Virgilio	Mantua	15,052	69.99	215.1
Borgocarbonara	Mantua	1,872	30.50	61.4
Borgoratto Mormorolo	Pavia	387	16.10	24.0
Borgosatollo	Brescia	9,099	8.42	1,080.6
Bormio	Sondrio	3,908	41.44	94.3
Bornasco	Pavia	2,656	12.93	205.4
Borno	Brescia	2,403	30.50	78.8
Bosisio Parini	Lecco	3,199	5.82	549.7
Bosnasco	Pavia	624	4.84	128.9
Bossico	Bergamo	965	7.09	136.1
Bottanuco	Bergamo	5,085	5.77	881.3
Botticino	Brescia	10,849	18.48	587.1
Bovegno	Brescia	2,012	47.99	41.9
Bovezzo	Brescia	7,386	6.41	1,152.3
Bovisio-Masciago	Monza and Brianza	16,953	4.93	3,438.7
Bozzolo	Mantua	4,081	18.82	216.8
Bracca	Bergamo	705	5.47	128.9
Brallo di Pregola	Pavia	473	46.15	10.2
Brandico	Brescia	1,767	8.38	210.9
Branzi	Bergamo	612	26.19	23.4
Braone	Brescia	681	13.36	51.0
Brebbia	Varese	3,137	6.87	456.6
Bregnano	Como	6,402	6.17	1,037.6
Brembate	Bergamo	8,745	5.54	1,578.5
Brembate di Sopra	Bergamo	8,068	4.14	1,948.8
Brembio	Lodi	2,807	17.08	164.3
Breme	Pavia	725	18.81	38.5
Brenna	Como	2,194	4.83	454.2
Breno	Brescia	4,674	59.94	78.0
Brenta	Varese	1,682	4.18	402.4
Brescia	Brescia	201,342	90.34	2,228.7
Bressana Bottarone	Pavia	3,482	12.69	274.4
Bresso	Milan	26,672	3.38	7,891.1
Brezzo di Bedero	Varese	1,214	9.95	122.0
Brienno	Como	311	8.97	34.7
Brignano Gera d'Adda	Bergamo	6,267	12.11	517.5
Brinzio	Varese	765	6.40	119.5
Brione	Brescia	759	6.90	110.0
Briosco	Monza and Brianza	6,131	6.61	927.5
Brissago-Valtravaglia	Varese	1,316	6.12	215.0
Brivio	Lecco	4,351	7.95	547.3
Broni	Pavia	10,164	20.85	487.5
Brugherio	Monza and Brianza	35,471	10.41	3,407.4
Brumano	Bergamo	135	8.14	16.6
Brunate	Como	1,572	2.03	774.4
Brunello	Varese	918	1.62	566.7
Brusaporto	Bergamo	5,704	4.99	1,143.1
Brusimpiano	Varese	1,174	5.91	198.6
Bubbiano	Milan	2,446	2.95	829.2
Buccinasco	Milan	26,345	12.00	2,195.4
Buglio in Monte	Sondrio	2,057	27.71	74.2
Buguggiate	Varese	3,115	2.50	1,246.0
Bulciago	Lecco	2,925	3.12	937.5
Bulgarograsso	Como	3,957	3.77	1,049.6
Burago di Molgora	Monza and Brianza	4,370	3.43	1,274.1
Buscate	Milan	4,696	7.83	599.7
Busnago	Monza and Brianza	6,882	5.78	1,190.7
Bussero	Milan	8,386	4.59	1,827.0
Busto Arsizio	Varese	84,595	30.66	2,759.1
Busto Garolfo	Milan	14,131	12.99	1,087.8
Cabiate	Como	7,404	3.18	2,328.3
Cadegliano-Viconago	Varese	2,120	10.27	206.4
Cadorago	Como	8,051	7.19	1,119.7
Cadrezzate con Osmate	Varese	2,742	8.25	332.4
Caglio	Como	476	6.52	73.0
Caino	Brescia	2,180	17.31	125.9
Caiolo	Sondrio	1,034	32.97	31.4
Cairate	Varese	7,886	11.26	700.4
Calcinate	Bergamo	6,254	15.08	414.7
Calcinato	Brescia	13,147	33.30	394.8
Calcio	Bergamo	5,551	15.67	354.2
Calco	Lecco	5,476	4.59	1,193.0
Calolziocorte	Lecco	13,593	9.10	1,493.7
Calusco d'Adda	Bergamo	8,432	8.33	1,012.2
Calvagese della Riviera	Brescia	3,679	11.74	313.4
Calvatone	Cremona	1,130	13.70	82.5
Calvenzano	Bergamo	4,535	6.72	674.9
Calvignano	Pavia	112	6.98	16.0
Calvignasco	Milan	1,201	1.73	694.2
Calvisano	Brescia	8,461	44.83	188.7
Cambiago	Milan	7,331	7.18	1,021.0
Camerata Cornello	Bergamo	545	12.94	42.1
Camisano	Cremona	1,253	10.95	114.4
Campagnola Cremasca	Cremona	649	4.64	139.9
Camparada	Monza and Brianza	2,261	1.63	1,387.1
Campione d'Italia	Como	1,848	2.68	689.6
Campodolcino	Sondrio	914	48.49	18.8
Campospinoso Albaredo	Pavia	1,333	12.45	107.1
Candia Lomellina	Pavia	1,562	27.90	56.0
Canegrate	Milan	12,889	5.25	2,455.0
Canneto Pavese	Pavia	1,285	5.81	221.2
Canneto sull'Oglio	Mantua	4,445	25.87	171.8
Canonica d'Adda	Bergamo	4,293	3.21	1,337.4
Cantello	Varese	4,866	9.13	533.0
Cantù	Como	40,451	23.25	1,739.8
Canzo	Como	5,223	11.11	470.1
Capergnanica	Cremona	2,150	6.84	314.3
Capiago Intimiano	Como	5,433	5.72	949.8
Capizzone	Bergamo	1,235	4.68	263.9
Capo di Ponte	Brescia	2,293	18.11	126.6
Caponago	Monza and Brianza	5,050	5.04	1,002.0
Capovalle	Brescia	332	22.95	14.5
Cappella Cantone	Cremona	538	13.15	40.9
Cappella de' Picenardi	Cremona	422	14.20	29.7
Capralba	Cremona	2,293	13.45	170.5
Capriano del Colle	Brescia	4,917	13.97	352.0
Capriate San Gervasio	Bergamo	8,316	5.78	1,438.8
Caprino Bergamasco	Bergamo	3,087	8.78	351.6
Capriolo	Brescia	9,405	10.60	887.3
Carate Brianza	Monza and Brianza	18,054	9.92	1,820.0
Carate Urio	Como	1,090	6.94	157.1
Caravaggio	Bergamo	16,513	33.39	494.5
Caravate	Varese	2,532	5.13	493.6
Carbonara al Ticino	Pavia	1,418	14.78	95.9
Carbonate	Como	2,977	4.92	605.1
Cardano al Campo	Varese	14,771	9.42	1,568.0
Carenno	Lecco	1,390	7.79	178.4
Carimate	Como	4,374	5.17	846.0
Carlazzo	Como	3,146	12.73	247.1
Carnago	Varese	6,610	6.21	1,064.4
Carnate	Monza and Brianza	7,992	3.47	2,303.2
Carobbio degli Angeli	Bergamo	4,912	6.82	720.2
Carona	Bergamo	282	44.15	6.4
Caronno Pertusella	Varese	18,556	8.40	2,209.0
Caronno Varesino	Varese	4,800	5.75	834.8
Carpenedolo	Brescia	13,050	29.84	437.3
Carpiano	Milan	4,119	17.24	238.9
Carugate	Milan	15,763	5.39	2,924.5
Carugo	Como	6,658	4.19	1,589.0
Carvico	Bergamo	4,700	4.59	1,024.0
Casalbuttano ed Uniti	Cremona	3,796	22.88	165.9
Casale Cremasco-Vidolasco	Cremona	1,815	9.19	197.5
Casale Litta	Varese	2,775	10.59	262.0
Casaletto Ceredano	Cremona	1,171	6.52	179.6
Casaletto di Sopra	Cremona	527	8.66	60.9
Casaletto Lodigiano	Lodi	3,019	9.75	309.6
Casaletto Vaprio	Cremona	1,778	5.40	329.3
Casalmaggiore	Cremona	15,114	64.53	234.2
Casalmaiocco	Lodi	3,218	4.71	683.2
Casalmorano	Cremona	1,727	12.28	140.6
Casalmoro	Mantua	2,216	13.70	161.8
Casaloldo	Mantua	2,624	16.85	155.7
Casalpusterlengo	Lodi	16,069	25.61	627.5
Casalromano	Mantua	1,498	12.03	124.5
Casalzuigno	Varese	1,409	7.32	192.5
Casanova Lonati	Pavia	452	4.63	97.6
Casargo	Lecco	833	19.71	42.3
Casarile	Milan	3,929	7.33	536.0
Casatenovo	Lecco	13,234	12.66	1,045.3
Casatisma	Pavia	855	5.48	156.0
Casazza	Bergamo	3,843	7.11	540.5
Casciago	Varese	3,549	4.05	876.3
Casei Gerola	Pavia	2,307	24.81	93.0
Caselle Landi	Lodi	1,431	26.01	55.0
Caselle Lurani	Lodi	3,071	7.68	399.9
Casirate d'Adda	Bergamo	4,139	10.17	407.0
Caslino d'Erba	Como	1,670	6.89	242.4
Casnate con Bernate	Como	5,033	5.22	964.2
Casnigo	Bergamo	3,005	13.62	220.6
Casorate Primo	Pavia	9,190	9.74	943.5
Casorate Sempione	Varese	5,631	6.91	814.9
Casorezzo	Milan	5,721	6.60	866.8
Caspoggio	Sondrio	1,316	7.31	180.0
Cassago Brianza	Lecco	4,395	3.55	1,238.0
Cassano d'Adda	Milan	19,980	18.60	1,074.2
Cassano Magnago	Varese	21,431	12.34	1,736.7
Cassano Valcuvia	Varese	647	3.95	163.8
Cassiglio	Bergamo	105	13.68	7.7
Cassina de' Pecchi	Milan	13,955	7.21	1,935.5
Cassina Rizzardi	Como	3,263	3.51	929.6
Cassina Valsassina	Lecco	549	2.72	201.8
Cassinetta di Lugagnano	Milan	1,967	3.32	592.5
Cassolnovo	Pavia	6,747	31.74	212.6
Castana	Pavia	707	5.28	133.9
Castano Primo	Milan	10,931	19.17	570.2
Casteggio	Pavia	6,363	17.66	360.3
Castegnato	Brescia	8,457	9.21	918.2
Castel d'Ario	Mantua	4,663	22.58	206.5
Castel Gabbiano	Cremona	542	5.79	93.6
Castel Goffredo	Mantua	12,732	42.40	300.3
Castel Mella	Brescia	10,961	7.53	1,455.6
Castel Rozzone	Bergamo	2,855	1.71	1,669.6
Castelbelforte	Mantua	3,381	22.34	151.3
Castelcovati	Brescia	7,087	6.14	1,154.2
Casteldidone	Cremona	542	10.79	50.2
Castelgerundo	Lodi	1,454	19.87	73.2
Castellanza	Varese	13,890	6.93	2,004.3
Castelleone	Cremona	9,340	45.08	207.2
Castelletto di Branduzzo	Pavia	1,056	11.77	89.7
Castelli Calepio	Bergamo	10,484	10.15	1,032.9
Castello Cabiaglio	Varese	550	6.98	78.8
Castello d'Agogna	Pavia	1,079	10.74	100.5
Castello dell'Acqua	Sondrio	607	14.07	43.1
Castello di Brianza	Lecco	2,633	3.59	733.4
Castellucchio	Mantua	5,161	46.34	111.4
Castelmarte	Como	1,267	1.97	643.1
Castelnovetto	Pavia	546	18.21	30.0
Castelnuovo Bocca d'Adda	Lodi	1,544	20.33	75.9
Castelnuovo Bozzente	Como	916	3.62	253.0
Castelseprio	Varese	1,330	3.75	354.7
Castelveccana	Varese	1,855	20.79	89.2
Castelverde	Cremona	5,699	30.89	184.5
Castelvisconti	Cremona	306	9.76	31.4
Castenedolo	Brescia	11,643	26.20	444.4
Castiglione d'Adda	Lodi	4,524	12.98	348.5
Castiglione delle Stiviere	Mantua	23,950	42.02	570.0
Castiglione Olona	Varese	7,454	6.90	1,080.3
Castione Andevenno	Sondrio	1,572	17.03	92.3
Castione della Presolana	Bergamo	3,381	42.50	79.6
Castiraga Vidardo	Lodi	3,048	5.04	604.8
Casto	Brescia	1,613	21.34	75.6
Castrezzato	Brescia	7,984	13.63	585.8
Castro	Bergamo	1,191	2.59	459.8
Castronno	Varese	5,035	3.76	1,339.1
Cava Manara	Pavia	6,684	17.26	387.3
Cavargna	Como	171	14.98	11.4
Cavaria con Premezzo	Varese	5,769	3.32	1,737.7
Cavenago d'Adda	Lodi	2,128	16.10	132.2
Cavenago di Brianza	Monza and Brianza	7,590	4.39	1,728.9
Cavernago	Bergamo	2,974	7.65	388.8
Cavriana	Mantua	3,654	36.91	99.0
Cazzago Brabbia	Varese	779	4.00	194.8
Cazzago San Martino	Brescia	10,784	22.34	482.7
Cazzano Sant'Andrea	Bergamo	1,694	2.02	838.6
Cecima	Pavia	254	10.12	25.1
Cedegolo	Brescia	1,129	11.08	101.9
Cedrasco	Sondrio	423	14.42	29.3
Cella Dati	Cremona	514	18.92	27.2
Cellatica	Brescia	4,815	6.55	735.1
Cenate Sopra	Bergamo	2,551	6.97	366.0
Cenate Sotto	Bergamo	4,001	4.62	866.0
Cene	Bergamo	4,044	8.60	470.2
Centro Valle Intelvi	Como	3,778	19.66	192.2
Cerano d'Intelvi	Como	593	5.55	106.8
Ceranova	Pavia	2,363	4.60	513.7
Cercino	Sondrio	806	5.69	141.7
Ceresara	Mantua	2,465	37.31	66.1
Cerete	Bergamo	1,643	14.07	116.8
Ceretto Lomellina	Pavia	188	7.38	25.5
Cergnago	Pavia	648	13.56	47.8
Ceriano Laghetto	Monza and Brianza	6,675	7.08	942.8
Cermenate	Como	9,457	8.18	1,156.1
Cernobbio	Como	6,152	12.28	501.0
Cernusco Lombardone	Lecco	3,837	3.74	1,025.9
Cernusco sul Naviglio	Milan	34,840	13.22	2,635.4
Cerro al Lambro	Milan	5,211	9.96	523.2
Cerro Maggiore	Milan	15,192	10.12	1,501.2
Certosa di Pavia	Pavia	5,623	10.86	517.8
Cerveno	Brescia	707	21.55	32.8
Cervesina	Pavia	1,103	12.41	88.9
Cervignano d'Adda	Lodi	2,247	4.07	552.1
Cesana Brianza	Lecco	2,327	3.70	628.9
Cesano Boscone	Milan	23,285	3.94	5,909.9
Cesano Maderno	Monza and Brianza	40,177	11.51	3,490.6
Cesate	Milan	14,364	5.77	2,489.4
Ceto	Brescia	1,775	32.30	55.0
Cevo	Brescia	771	35.47	21.7
Chiari	Brescia	19,717	37.96	519.4
Chiavenna	Sondrio	7,294	10.77	677.3
Chiesa in Valmalenco	Sondrio	2,219	107.60	20.6
Chieve	Cremona	2,270	6.19	366.7
Chignolo d'Isola	Bergamo	3,383	5.55	609.5
Chignolo Po	Pavia	4,048	23.39	173.1
Chiuduno	Bergamo	6,260	6.88	909.9
Chiuro	Sondrio	2,434	51.76	47.0
Cicognolo	Cremona	977	6.96	140.4
Cigognola	Pavia	1,308	7.88	166.0
Cigole	Brescia	1,503	9.93	151.4
Cilavegna	Pavia	5,438	18.05	301.3
Cimbergo	Brescia	526	24.71	21.3
Cingia de' Botti	Cremona	1,171	14.36	81.5
Cinisello Balsamo	Milan	75,154	12.72	5,908.3
Cino	Sondrio	338	5.07	66.7
Cirimido	Como	2,198	2.63	835.7
Cisano Bergamasco	Bergamo	6,232	7.82	796.9
Ciserano	Bergamo	5,843	5.31	1,100.4
Cislago	Varese	10,572	11.13	949.9
Cisliano	Milan	5,200	14.68	354.2
Cittiglio	Varese	3,805	11.11	342.5
Civate	Lecco	3,709	9.27	400.1
Cividate al Piano	Bergamo	5,099	9.73	524.0
Cividate Camuno	Brescia	2,687	3.31	811.8
Civo	Sondrio	1,139	25.14	45.3
Claino con Osteno	Como	543	12.90	42.1
Clivio	Varese	1,982	2.98	665.1
Clusone	Bergamo	8,596	26.19	328.2
Coccaglio	Brescia	8,937	12.05	741.7
Cocquio-Trevisago	Varese	4,651	9.81	474.1
Codevilla	Pavia	915	12.96	70.6
Codogno	Lodi	15,652	20.87	750.0
Cogliate	Monza and Brianza	8,469	6.96	1,216.8
Colere	Bergamo	1,077	18.63	57.8
Colico	Lecco	8,188	35.06	233.5
Colle Brianza	Lecco	1,860	8.32	223.6
Collebeato	Brescia	4,469	5.27	848.0
Colli Verdi	Pavia	968	41.25	23.5
Collio	Brescia	1,955	53.48	36.6
Cologne	Brescia	7,608	13.79	551.7
Cologno al Serio	Bergamo	11,287	18.52	609.4
Cologno Monzese	Milan	47,179	8.40	5,616.5
Colonno	Como	432	5.62	76.9
Colorina	Sondrio	1,357	17.84	76.1
Colturano	Milan	2,056	4.16	494.2
Colverde	Como	5,553	8.58	647.2
Colzate	Bergamo	1,641	6.75	243.1
Comabbio	Varese	1,177	4.69	251.0
Comazzo	Lodi	2,379	12.80	185.9
Comerio	Varese	2,784	5.55	501.6
Comezzano-Cizzago	Brescia	4,202	15.44	272.2
Commessaggio	Mantua	1,022	11.65	87.7
Como	Como	83,035	37.12	2,236.9
Comun Nuovo	Bergamo	4,471	6.45	693.2
Concesio	Brescia	15,735	19.08	824.7
Concorezzo	Monza and Brianza	16,153	8.51	1,898.1
Confienza	Pavia	1,546	26.81	57.7
Copiano	Pavia	1,784	4.34	411.1
Corana	Pavia	745	12.87	57.9
Corbetta	Milan	19,156	18.69	1,024.9
Cormano	Milan	21,036	4.47	4,706.0
Corna Imagna	Bergamo	918	4.50	204.0
Cornalba	Bergamo	305	9.25	33.0
Cornale e Bastida	Pavia	785	3.82	205.5
Cornaredo	Milan	20,746	11.07	1,874.1
Cornate d'Adda	Monza and Brianza	11,134	13.82	805.6
Cornegliano Laudense	Lodi	2,861	5.70	501.9
Corno Giovine	Lodi	1,144	9.94	115.1
Cornovecchio	Lodi	199	6.53	30.5
Correzzana	Monza and Brianza	3,289	2.51	1,310.4
Corrido	Como	845	6.19	136.5
Corsico	Milan	34,811	5.36	6,494.6
Corte de' Cortesi con Cignone	Cremona	1,070	12.85	83.3
Corte de' Frati	Cremona	1,318	20.41	64.6
Corte Franca	Brescia	7,150	13.97	511.8
Corte Palasio	Lodi	1,522	15.68	97.1
Corteno Golgi	Brescia	1,909	82.61	23.1
Cortenova	Lecco	1,173	11.77	99.7
Cortenuova	Bergamo	1,981	7.35	269.5
Corteolona e Genzone	Pavia	2,572	14.09	182.5
Corvino San Quirico	Pavia	960	4.37	219.7
Corzano	Brescia	1,540	12.30	125.2
Cosio Valtellino	Sondrio	5,586	23.99	232.8
Costa de' Nobili	Pavia	358	11.82	30.3
Costa di Mezzate	Bergamo	3,428	5.22	656.7
Costa Masnaga	Lecco	4,738	5.62	843.1
Costa Serina	Bergamo	910	12.30	74.0
Costa Valle Imagna	Bergamo	547	4.21	129.9
Costa Volpino	Bergamo	8,792	18.67	470.9
Covo	Bergamo	4,368	12.94	337.6
Cozzo	Pavia	358	17.61	20.3
Crandola Valsassina	Lecco	261	8.81	29.6
Credaro	Bergamo	3,561	3.41	1,044.3
Credera Rubbiano	Cremona	1,476	14.13	104.5
Crema	Cremona	34,147	34.52	989.2
Cremella	Lecco	1,689	1.89	893.7
Cremenaga	Varese	782	4.55	171.9
Cremeno	Lecco	1,839	13.18	139.5
Cremia	Como	674	10.14	66.5
Cremona	Cremona	71,093	70.49	1,008.6
Cremosano	Cremona	1,730	5.76	300.3
Crespiatica	Lodi	2,208	7.03	314.1
Crosio della Valle	Varese	624	1.44	433.3
Crotta d'Adda	Cremona	613	12.94	47.4
Cuasso al Monte	Varese	3,545	16.18	219.1
Cucciago	Como	3,365	4.93	682.6
Cuggiono	Milan	8,198	14.93	549.1
Cugliate-Fabiasco	Varese	3,119	6.54	476.9
Cumignano sul Naviglio	Cremona	406	6.77	60.0
Cunardo	Varese	2,880	6.06	475.2
Cura Carpignano	Pavia	5,080	11.09	458.1
Curiglia con Monteviasco	Varese	141	10.85	13.0
Curno	Bergamo	7,574	4.70	1,611.5
Curtatone	Mantua	14,691	67.47	217.7
Cusago	Milan	4,869	11.46	424.9
Cusano Milanino	Milan	18,994	3.08	6,166.9
Cusino	Como	250	9.65	25.9
Cusio	Bergamo	197	9.41	20.9
Cuveglio	Varese	3,378	7.53	448.6
Cuvio	Varese	1,754	5.96	294.3
Dairago	Milan	6,346	5.64	1,125.2
Dalmine	Bergamo	23,818	11.81	2,016.8
Darfo Boario Terme	Brescia	15,974	36.07	442.9
Daverio	Varese	3,030	4.03	751.9
Dazio	Sondrio	521	3.73	139.7
Delebio	Sondrio	3,353	22.44	149.4
Dello	Brescia	5,686	23.32	243.8
Derovere	Cremona	284	9.99	28.4
Dervio	Lecco	2,518	11.70	215.2
Desenzano del Garda	Brescia	29,353	59.26	495.3
Desio	Monza and Brianza	41,872	14.76	2,836.9
Dizzasco	Como	642	3.61	177.8
Dolzago	Lecco	2,544	2.26	1,125.7
Domaso	Como	1,392	6.28	221.7
Dongo	Como	3,158	7.04	448.6
Dorio	Lecco	325	11.66	27.9
Dorno	Pavia	4,608	30.57	150.7
Dosolo	Mantua	3,155	25.54	123.5
Dossena	Bergamo	878	19.56	44.9
Dosso del Liro	Como	235	23.49	10.0
Dovera	Cremona	3,734	20.65	180.8
Dresano	Milan	3,054	3.48	877.6
Dubino	Sondrio	3,847	13.24	290.6
Dumenza	Varese	1,461	18.40	79.4
Duno	Varese	163	2.49	65.5
Edolo	Brescia	4,447	88.90	50.0
Ello	Lecco	1,187	2.42	490.5
Endine Gaiano	Bergamo	3,462	21.07	164.3
Entratico	Bergamo	2,025	4.15	488.0
Erba	Como	16,266	17.80	913.8
Erbusco	Brescia	8,852	16.24	545.1
Erve	Lecco	644	6.20	103.9
Esine	Brescia	5,055	30.31	166.8
Esino Lario	Lecco	751	18.05	41.6
Eupilio	Como	2,526	6.94	364.0
Faedo Valtellino	Sondrio	508	4.80	105.8
Faggeto Lario	Como	1,063	17.52	60.7
Fagnano Olona	Varese	12,411	8.68	1,429.8
Faloppio	Como	4,882	4.14	1,179.2
Fara Gera d'Adda	Bergamo	8,080	10.79	748.8
Fara Olivana con Sola	Bergamo	1,345	5.04	266.9
Fenegrò	Como	3,326	5.36	620.5
Ferno	Varese	6,715	8.66	775.4
Ferrera di Varese	Varese	694	1.53	453.6
Ferrera Erbognone	Pavia	1,112	19.17	58.0
Fiesco	Cremona	1,217	8.19	148.6
Fiesse	Brescia	2,095	16.02	130.8
Figino Serenza	Como	4,972	4.96	1,002.4
Filago	Bergamo	3,130	5.42	577.5
Filighera	Pavia	812	8.25	98.4
Fino del Monte	Bergamo	1,135	4.29	264.6
Fino Mornasco	Como	10,139	7.24	1,400.4
Fiorano al Serio	Bergamo	2,938	1.06	2,771.7
Flero	Brescia	8,812	9.84	895.5
Fombio	Lodi	2,266	7.40	306.2
Fontanella	Bergamo	4,914	17.80	276.1
Fonteno	Bergamo	550	10.93	50.3
Foppolo	Bergamo	152	16.14	9.4
Forcola	Sondrio	753	15.90	47.4
Foresto Sparso	Bergamo	3,133	7.87	398.1
Formigara	Cremona	1,038	12.64	82.1
Fornovo San Giovanni	Bergamo	3,424	7.04	486.4
Fortunago	Pavia	367	17.83	20.6
Frascarolo	Pavia	1,075	24.18	44.5
Fuipiano Valle Imagna	Bergamo	203	4.28	47.4
Fusine	Sondrio	545	37.60	14.5
Gabbioneta-Binanuova	Cremona	859	15.71	54.7
Gadesco-Pieve Delmona	Cremona	1,882	17.10	110.1
Gaggiano	Milan	9,543	26.26	363.4
Galbiate	Lecco	8,426	15.64	538.7
Galgagnano	Lodi	1,308	6.01	217.6
Gallarate	Varese	53,023	20.98	2,527.3
Galliate Lombardo	Varese	1,035	3.27	316.5
Galliavola	Pavia	171	9.23	18.5
Gambara	Brescia	4,760	31.59	150.7
Gambarana	Pavia	174	11.78	14.8
Gambolò	Pavia	9,813	51.70	189.8
Gandellino	Bergamo	936	25.13	37.2
Gandino	Bergamo	5,182	29.03	178.5
Gandosso	Bergamo	1,446	3.13	462.0
Garbagnate Milanese	Milan	27,064	9.00	3,007.1
Garbagnate Monastero	Lecco	2,503	3.50	715.1
Gardone Riviera	Brescia	2,568	21.39	120.1
Gardone Val Trompia	Brescia	11,599	26.66	435.1
Gargnano	Brescia	2,615	76.75	34.1
Garlasco	Pavia	9,665	39.18	246.7
Garlate	Lecco	2,661	3.30	806.4
Garzeno	Como	656	28.76	22.8
Gavardo	Brescia	12,438	29.80	417.4
Gaverina Terme	Bergamo	899	5.20	172.9
Gavirate	Varese	9,145	12.01	761.4
Gazoldo degli Ippoliti	Mantua	3,046	13.03	233.8
Gazzada Schianno	Varese	4,635	4.84	957.6
Gazzaniga	Bergamo	4,976	14.41	345.3
Gazzuolo	Mantua	2,035	22.49	90.5
Gemonio	Varese	2,871	3.67	782.3
Genivolta	Cremona	1,082	18.57	58.3
Gera Lario	Como	1,065	7.18	148.3
Gerenzago	Pavia	1,503	5.41	277.8
Gerenzano	Varese	11,065	9.79	1,130.2
Germignaga	Varese	3,781	4.66	811.4
Gerola Alta	Sondrio	158	37.43	4.2
Gerre de' Caprioli	Cremona	1,310	7.72	169.7
Gessate	Milan	9,137	7.76	1,177.4
Ghedi	Brescia	18,546	60.84	304.8
Ghisalba	Bergamo	6,256	10.59	590.7
Gianico	Brescia	2,078	13.38	155.3
Giussago	Pavia	5,385	24.72	217.8
Giussano	Monza and Brianza	26,509	10.28	2,578.7
Godiasco	Pavia	3,294	20.61	159.8
Goito	Mantua	10,135	79.22	127.9
Golasecca	Varese	2,630	7.44	353.5
Golferenzo	Pavia	162	4.42	36.7
Gombito	Cremona	611	9.28	65.8
Gonzaga	Mantua	8,574	49.89	171.9
Gordona	Sondrio	1,956	62.79	31.2
Gorgonzola	Milan	21,448	10.58	2,027.2
Gorla Maggiore	Varese	4,781	5.16	926.6
Gorla Minore	Varese	8,236	7.48	1,101.1
Gorlago	Bergamo	5,182	5.70	909.1
Gorle	Bergamo	6,572	2.52	2,607.9
Gornate-Olona	Varese	2,212	4.70	470.6
Gorno	Bergamo	1,429	10.00	142.9
Gottolengo	Brescia	5,051	29.28	172.5
Graffignana	Lodi	2,602	10.92	238.3
Grandate	Como	2,803	2.83	990.5
Grandola ed Uniti	Como	1,289	16.90	76.3
Grantola	Varese	1,225	2.05	597.6
Grassobbio	Bergamo	6,547	8.74	749.1
Gravedona ed Uniti	Como	4,032	39.85	101.2
Gravellona Lomellina	Pavia	2,696	20.34	132.5
Grezzago	Milan	3,176	2.46	1,291.1
Griante	Como	553	6.55	84.4
Gromo	Bergamo	1,142	20.07	56.9
Grone	Bergamo	938	7.78	120.6
Grontardo	Cremona	1,498	12.26	122.2
Gropello Cairoli	Pavia	4,362	26.22	166.4
Grosio	Sondrio	4,230	126.92	33.3
Grosotto	Sondrio	1,641	53.12	30.9
Grumello Cremonese ed Uniti	Cremona	1,725	22.29	77.4
Grumello del Monte	Bergamo	7,675	9.94	772.1
Guanzate	Como	5,810	6.91	840.8
Guardamiglio	Lodi	2,730	10.44	261.5
Gudo Visconti	Milan	1,608	6.10	263.6
Guidizzolo	Mantua	6,045	22.38	270.1
Gussago	Brescia	16,663	25.09	664.1
Gussola	Cremona	2,687	25.23	106.5
Idro	Brescia	1,873	22.89	81.8
Imbersago	Lecco	2,565	3.14	816.9
Inarzo	Varese	1,073	2.43	441.6
Incudine	Brescia	345	19.67	17.5
Induno Olona	Varese	10,446	12.37	844.5
Introbio	Lecco	1,948	26.03	74.8
Inverigo	Como	9,149	9.99	915.8
Inverno e Monteleone	Pavia	1,493	9.64	154.9
Inveruno	Milan	8,568	12.14	705.8
Inzago	Milan	11,465	12.21	939.0
Irma	Brescia	135	4.93	27.4
Iseo	Brescia	8,969	28.42	315.6
Isola di Fondra	Bergamo	172	12.83	13.4
Isola Dovarese	Cremona	1,065	9.47	112.5
Isorella	Brescia	4,123	15.33	268.9
Ispra	Varese	5,358	15.91	336.8
Isso	Bergamo	635	5.06	125.5
Izano	Cremona	1,951	6.19	315.2
Jerago con Orago	Varese	5,177	3.87	1,337.7
La Valletta Brianza	Lecco	4,637	8.78	528.1
Lacchiarella	Milan	9,131	24.04	379.8
Laglio	Como	813	6.20	131.1
Lainate	Milan	26,457	12.93	2,046.2
Laino	Como	566	6.68	84.7
Lallio	Bergamo	4,254	2.16	1,969.4
Lambrugo	Como	2,544	1.84	1,382.6
Landriano	Pavia	6,551	15.59	420.2
Langosco	Pavia	365	15.82	23.1
Lanzada	Sondrio	1,227	117.17	10.5
Lardirago	Pavia	1,163	5.34	217.8
Lasnigo	Como	444	5.53	80.3
Lavena Ponte Tresa	Varese	5,649	4.44	1,272.3
Laveno-Mombello	Varese	8,370	23.53	355.7
Lavenone	Brescia	508	31.82	16.0
Lazzate	Monza and Brianza	7,722	5.31	1,454.2
Lecco	Lecco	47,326	45.14	1,048.4
Leffe	Bergamo	4,313	6.69	644.7
Leggiuno	Varese	3,621	13.19	274.5
Legnano	Milan	60,980	17.68	3,449.1
Lenna	Bergamo	549	12.74	43.1
Leno	Brescia	14,474	58.45	247.6
Lentate sul Seveso	Monza and Brianza	16,049	13.98	1,148.0
Lesmo	Monza and Brianza	8,376	5.12	1,635.9
Levate	Bergamo	3,740	5.53	676.3
Lezzeno	Como	1,856	20.70	89.7
Lierna	Lecco	2,111	11.24	187.8
Limbiate	Monza and Brianza	35,865	12.29	2,918.2
Limido Comasco	Como	3,925	4.56	860.7
Limone sul Garda	Brescia	1,096	23.03	47.6
Linarolo	Pavia	2,797	13.17	212.4
Lipomo	Como	5,869	2.30	2,551.7
Liscate	Milan	3,931	9.41	417.7
Lissone	Monza and Brianza	46,792	9.30	5,031.4
Livigno	Sondrio	6,663	227.30	29.3
Livo	Como	158	33.13	4.8
Livraga	Lodi	2,534	12.37	204.9
Locate di Triulzi	Milan	10,360	12.61	821.6
Locate Varesino	Como	4,303	6.04	712.4
Locatello	Bergamo	812	3.79	214.2
Lodi	Lodi	45,643	41.38	1,103.0
Lodi Vecchio	Lodi	7,717	16.45	469.1
Lodrino	Brescia	1,627	16.50	98.6
Lograto	Brescia	3,845	12.43	309.3
Lomagna	Lecco	5,118	3.91	1,309.0
Lomazzo	Como	10,046	9.48	1,059.7
Lomello	Pavia	2,010	22.36	89.9
Lonate Ceppino	Varese	5,177	4.84	1,069.6
Lonate Pozzolo	Varese	11,338	29.24	387.8
Lonato del Garda	Brescia	17,168	68.20	251.7
Longhena	Brescia	565	3.47	162.8
Longone al Segrino	Como	1,984	1.60	1,240.0
Losine	Brescia	647	6.26	103.4
Lovere	Bergamo	4,943	7.92	624.1
Lovero	Sondrio	608	13.46	45.2
Lozio	Brescia	365	23.74	15.4
Lozza	Varese	1,211	1.71	708.2
Luino	Varese	14,003	21.01	666.5
Luisago	Como	2,834	2.16	1,312.0
Lumezzane	Brescia	21,742	31.72	685.4
Lungavilla	Pavia	2,407	6.82	352.9
Lurago d'Erba	Como	5,587	4.70	1,188.7
Lurago Marinone	Como	2,598	3.89	667.9
Lurano	Bergamo	2,893	4.05	714.3
Lurate Caccivio	Como	9,692	5.93	1,634.4
Luvinate	Varese	1,349	4.07	331.4
Luzzana	Bergamo	912	3.48	262.1
Maccagno con Pino e Veddasca	Varese	2,293	41.96	54.6
Maccastorna	Lodi	67	5.75	11.7
Macherio	Monza and Brianza	7,582	3.18	2,384.3
Maclodio	Brescia	1,478	5.10	289.8
Madesimo	Sondrio	505	85.66	5.9
Madignano	Cremona	2,764	10.76	256.9
Madone	Bergamo	4,211	3.07	1,371.7
Magasa	Brescia	104	19.11	5.4
Magenta	Milan	25,066	21.99	1,139.9
Magherno	Pavia	1,798	5.25	342.5
Magnacavallo	Mantua	1,399	28.20	49.6
Magnago	Milan	9,547	11.23	850.1
Magreglio	Como	673	3.08	218.5
Mairago	Lodi	1,375	11.25	122.2
Mairano	Brescia	3,498	11.53	303.4
Malagnino	Cremona	1,703	10.82	157.4
Malegno	Brescia	1,925	6.89	279.4
Maleo	Lodi	3,055	19.83	154.1
Malgrate	Lecco	4,146	1.90	2,182.1
Malnate	Varese	16,650	9.00	1,850.0
Malonno	Brescia	2,997	31.46	95.3
Mandello del Lario	Lecco	9,856	43.33	227.5
Manerba del Garda	Brescia	5,415	36.63	147.8
Manerbio	Brescia	13,630	27.88	488.9
Mantello	Sondrio	747	3.78	197.6
Mantua	Mantua	50,215	63.81	786.9
Mapello	Bergamo	7,039	8.66	812.8
Marcallo con Casone	Milan	6,403	8.21	779.9
Marcaria	Mantua	6,338	89.79	70.6
Marcheno	Brescia	4,152	22.74	182.6
Marchirolo	Varese	3,571	5.49	650.5
Marcignago	Pavia	2,455	10.12	242.6
Margno	Lecco	421	3.59	117.3
Mariana Mantovana	Mantua	794	8.91	89.1
Mariano Comense	Como	25,531	13.80	1,850.1
Marmentino	Brescia	648	18.04	35.9
Marmirolo	Mantua	7,653	42.02	182.1
Marnate	Varese	8,136	4.85	1,677.5
Marone	Brescia	3,096	23.93	129.4
Martignana di Po	Cremona	2,024	14.92	135.7
Martinengo	Bergamo	11,172	22.05	506.7
Marudo	Lodi	1,757	4.20	418.3
Marzano	Pavia	1,804	9.29	194.2
Marzio	Varese	311	1.86	167.2
Masate	Milan	3,917	4.39	892.3
Masciago Primo	Varese	275	1.81	151.9
Maslianico	Como	3,162	1.29	2,451.2
Massalengo	Lodi	4,456	8.48	525.5
Mazzano	Brescia	12,715	15.73	808.3
Mazzo di Valtellina	Sondrio	1,009	15.32	65.9
Meda	Monza and Brianza	23,735	8.31	2,856.2
Mede	Pavia	6,102	32.89	185.5
Mediglia	Milan	12,373	21.96	563.4
Medolago	Bergamo	2,381	3.80	626.6
Medole	Mantua	4,243	25.73	164.9
Melegnano	Milan	18,169	5.00	3,633.8
Meleti	Lodi	456	7.39	61.7
Mello	Sondrio	950	11.43	83.1
Melzo	Milan	18,540	9.82	1,888.0
Menaggio	Como	2,946	11.77	250.3
Menconico	Pavia	326	28.14	11.6
Merate	Lecco	15,031	11.06	1,359.0
Mercallo	Varese	1,782	5.48	325.2
Merlino	Lodi	1,655	10.73	154.2
Merone	Como	4,003	3.28	1,220.4
Mese	Sondrio	1,889	4.15	455.2
Mesenzana	Varese	1,825	4.88	374.0
Mesero	Milan	4,134	5.64	733.0
Mezzago	Monza and Brianza	4,479	4.32	1,036.8
Mezzana Bigli	Pavia	1,061	19.02	55.8
Mezzana Rabattone	Pavia	457	7.06	64.7
Mezzanino	Pavia	1,405	12.51	112.3
Mezzoldo	Bergamo	170	18.84	9.0
Milan	Milan	1,362,863	181.67	7,501.9
Milzano	Brescia	1,704	8.49	200.7
Miradolo Terme	Pavia	3,909	9.56	408.9
Misano di Gera d'Adda	Bergamo	3,058	6.11	500.5
Misinto	Monza and Brianza	5,749	5.11	1,125.0
Missaglia	Lecco	9,010	11.52	782.1
Moggio	Lecco	492	13.43	36.6
Moglia	Mantua	5,394	31.85	169.4
Moio de' Calvi	Bergamo	199	6.36	31.3
Molteno	Lecco	3,528	3.12	1,130.8
Moltrasio	Como	1,485	8.90	166.9
Monasterolo del Castello	Bergamo	1,153	8.75	131.8
Monguzzo	Como	2,381	3.73	638.3
Moniga del Garda	Brescia	2,682	14.65	183.1
Monno	Brescia	515	31.03	16.6
Montagna in Valtellina	Sondrio	2,945	44.97	65.5
Montalto Pavese	Pavia	926	20.82	44.5
Montanaso Lombardo	Lodi	2,256	9.52	237.0
Montano Lucino	Como	5,479	5.22	1,049.6
Monte Cremasco	Cremona	2,217	2.34	947.4
Monte Isola	Brescia	1,576	12.61	125.0
Monte Marenzo	Lecco	1,775	3.06	580.1
Montebello della Battaglia	Pavia	1,437	15.74	91.3
Montecalvo Versiggia	Pavia	478	11.40	41.9
Montegrino Valtravaglia	Varese	1,522	10.10	150.7
Montello	Bergamo	3,267	1.82	1,795.1
Montemezzo	Como	203	9.02	22.5
Montescano	Pavia	439	2.40	182.9
Montesegale	Pavia	239	14.97	16.0
Montevecchia	Lecco	2,680	5.80	462.1
Monticelli Brusati	Brescia	4,556	10.89	418.4
Monticelli Pavese	Pavia	662	20.19	32.8
Monticello Brianza	Lecco	4,184	4.61	907.6
Montichiari	Brescia	26,506	81.66	324.6
Montirone	Brescia	5,161	10.52	490.6
Montodine	Cremona	2,394	11.39	210.2
Montorfano	Como	2,494	3.52	708.5
Montù Beccaria	Pavia	1,642	15.49	106.0
Monvalle	Varese	1,889	4.54	416.1
Monza	Monza and Brianza	123,672	33.09	3,737.4
Monzambano	Mantua	4,805	30.02	160.1
Morazzone	Varese	4,320	5.60	771.4
Morbegno	Sondrio	12,421	14.82	838.1
Morengo	Bergamo	2,486	9.57	259.8
Morimondo	Milan	1,005	26.00	38.7
Mornago	Varese	4,847	12.24	396.0
Mornico al Serio	Bergamo	3,052	6.92	441.0
Mornico Losana	Pavia	605	8.30	72.9
Mortara	Pavia	15,934	51.97	306.6
Morterone	Lecco	30	13.71	2.2
Moscazzano	Cremona	697	8.15	85.5
Motta Baluffi	Cremona	769	16.47	46.7
Motta Visconti	Milan	8,253	10.51	785.3
Motteggiana	Mantua	2,408	24.79	97.1
Mozzanica	Bergamo	4,434	9.46	468.7
Mozzate	Como	8,684	10.68	813.1
Mozzo	Bergamo	7,233	3.64	1,987.1
Muggiò	Monza and Brianza	23,585	5.48	4,303.8
Mulazzano	Lodi	5,829	15.58	374.1
Mura	Brescia	765	12.51	61.2
Muscoline	Brescia	2,730	10.08	270.8
Musso	Como	935	3.71	252.0
Nave	Brescia	10,627	27.21	390.6
Nembro	Bergamo	11,284	15.24	740.4
Nerviano	Milan	17,071	13.26	1,287.4
Nesso	Como	1,074	15.03	71.5
Niardo	Brescia	1,949	22.16	88.0
Nibionno	Lecco	3,588	3.51	1,022.2
Nicorvo	Pavia	288	8.08	35.6
Nosate	Milan	638	4.88	130.7
Nova Milanese	Monza and Brianza	23,068	5.85	3,943.2
Novate Mezzola	Sondrio	1,923	99.75	19.3
Novate Milanese	Milan	20,415	5.46	3,739.0
Novedrate	Como	2,871	2.92	983.2
Noviglio	Milan	4,534	15.86	285.9
Nuvolento	Brescia	3,962	7.46	531.1
Nuvolera	Brescia	4,777	13.31	358.9
Odolo	Brescia	1,948	6.54	297.9
Offanengo	Cremona	5,945	12.58	472.6
Offlaga	Brescia	4,167	23.03	180.9
Oggiona con Santo Stefano	Varese	4,365	2.75	1,587.3
Oggiono	Lecco	9,218	7.96	1,158.0
Olevano di Lomellina	Pavia	723	15.38	47.0
Olgiate Comasco	Como	12,184	10.96	1,111.7
Olgiate Molgora	Lecco	6,414	7.09	904.7
Olgiate Olona	Varese	12,953	7.21	1,796.5
Olginate	Lecco	6,925	8.00	865.6
Oliva Gessi	Pavia	163	3.91	41.7
Oliveto Lario	Lecco	1,148	15.70	73.1
Olmeneta	Cremona	934	9.15	102.1
Olmo al Brembo	Bergamo	453	7.90	57.3
Oltre il Colle	Bergamo	920	32.89	28.0
Oltressenda Alta	Bergamo	135	17.33	7.8
Oltrona di San Mamette	Como	2,356	2.69	875.8
Ome	Brescia	3,103	9.85	315.0
Oneta	Bergamo	583	18.66	31.2
Ono San Pietro	Brescia	973	13.78	70.6
Onore	Bergamo	977	11.78	82.9
Opera	Milan	14,463	7.64	1,893.1
Origgio	Varese	8,068	7.92	1,018.7
Orino	Varese	848	3.72	228.0
Orio al Serio	Bergamo	1,588	3.04	522.4
Orio Litta	Lodi	2,076	9.78	212.3
Ornago	Monza and Brianza	5,487	5.88	933.2
Ornica	Bergamo	126	15.10	8.3
Orsenigo	Como	2,638	4.46	591.5
Orzinuovi	Brescia	12,496	47.87	261.0
Orzivecchi	Brescia	2,517	9.94	253.2
Osio Sopra	Bergamo	5,195	5.18	1,002.9
Osio Sotto	Bergamo	12,892	7.59	1,698.6
Osnago	Lecco	4,831	4.49	1,075.9
Ospedaletto Lodigiano	Lodi	2,008	8.50	236.2
Ospitaletto	Brescia	14,969	9.29	1,611.3
Ossago Lodigiano	Lodi	1,422	11.53	123.3
Ossimo	Brescia	1,439	14.86	96.8
Ossona	Milan	4,440	5.98	742.5
Ostiano	Cremona	2,825	19.49	144.9
Ostiglia	Mantua	6,849	39.84	171.9
Ottobiano	Pavia	1,083	24.98	43.4
Ozzero	Milan	1,349	10.97	123.0
Padenghe sul Garda	Brescia	4,912	26.81	183.2
Paderno d'Adda	Lecco	3,891	3.56	1,093.0
Paderno Dugnano	Milan	47,938	14.11	3,397.4
Paderno Franciacorta	Brescia	3,667	5.61	653.7
Paderno Ponchielli	Cremona	1,292	23.96	53.9
Pagazzano	Bergamo	2,238	5.24	427.1
Pagnona	Lecco	309	9.20	33.6
Paisco Loveno	Brescia	164	35.87	4.6
Paitone	Brescia	2,248	8.00	281.0
Paladina	Bergamo	3,946	2.09	1,888.0
Palazzago	Bergamo	4,597	13.96	329.3
Palazzo Pignano	Cremona	3,793	8.82	430.0
Palazzolo sull'Oglio	Brescia	20,603	23.04	894.2
Palestro	Pavia	1,895	18.81	100.7
Palosco	Bergamo	5,730	10.79	531.0
Pancarana	Pavia	331	6.10	54.3
Pandino	Cremona	8,988	22.30	403.0
Pantigliate	Milan	5,886	5.69	1,034.4
Parabiago	Milan	28,398	14.29	1,987.3
Paratico	Brescia	5,023	6.18	812.8
Parlasco	Lecco	135	3.00	45.0
Parona	Pavia	1,858	9.30	199.8
Parre	Bergamo	2,650	22.28	118.9
Parzanica	Bergamo	333	9.82	33.9
Paspardo	Brescia	576	11.15	51.7
Passirano	Brescia	6,842	13.39	511.0
Pasturo	Lecco	1,959	21.78	89.9
Paullo	Milan	11,136	8.82	1,262.6
Pavia	Pavia	71,811	63.24	1,135.5
Pavone del Mella	Brescia	2,717	11.61	234.0
Pedesina	Sondrio	40	6.30	6.3
Pedrengo	Bergamo	5,911	3.60	1,641.9
Peglio	Como	193	10.57	18.3
Pegognaga	Mantua	6,972	46.57	149.7
Peia	Bergamo	1,663	4.48	371.2
Perledo	Lecco	830	13.68	60.7
Pero	Milan	11,866	4.98	2,382.7
Persico Dosimo	Cremona	3,250	20.61	157.7
Pertica Alta	Brescia	549	20.92	26.2
Pertica Bassa	Brescia	543	30.13	18.0
Pescarolo ed Uniti	Cremona	1,547	16.54	93.5
Pescate	Lecco	2,134	2.10	1,016.2
Peschiera Borromeo	Milan	24,363	23.22	1,049.2
Pessano con Bornago	Milan	9,034	6.66	1,356.5
Pessina Cremonese	Cremona	574	22.02	26.1
Pezzaze	Brescia	1,419	21.49	66.0
Piadena	Cremona	4,063	31.69	128.2
Pian Camuno	Brescia	4,826	10.95	440.7
Piancogno	Brescia	4,787	14.30	334.8
Pianello del Lario	Como	1,074	9.80	109.6
Pianengo	Cremona	2,570	5.76	446.2
Pianico	Bergamo	1,456	2.70	539.3
Piantedo	Sondrio	1,425	6.80	209.6
Piario	Bergamo	1,000	1.55	645.2
Piateda	Sondrio	2,059	70.80	29.1
Piazza Brembana	Bergamo	1,195	6.77	176.5
Piazzatorre	Bergamo	396	24.24	16.3
Piazzolo	Bergamo	92	4.15	22.2
Pieranica	Cremona	1,107	2.73	405.5
Pietra de' Giorgi	Pavia	777	11.20	69.4
Pieve Albignola	Pavia	792	18.15	43.6
Pieve d'Olmi	Cremona	1,238	19.44	63.7
Pieve del Cairo	Pavia	1,802	25.11	71.8
Pieve Emanuele	Milan	15,846	12.91	1,227.4
Pieve Fissiraga	Lodi	1,753	12.27	142.9
Pieve Porto Morone	Pavia	2,730	16.40	166.5
Pieve San Giacomo	Cremona	1,571	14.85	105.8
Pigra	Como	229	4.53	50.6
Pinarolo Po	Pavia	1,654	11.31	146.2
Pioltello	Milan	37,709	13.09	2,880.7
Pisogne	Brescia	7,901	49.23	160.5
Piubega	Mantua	1,747	16.59	105.3
Piuro	Sondrio	1,917	84.25	22.8
Pizzale	Pavia	670	7.09	94.5
Pizzighettone	Cremona	6,242	32.06	194.7
Plesio	Como	807	16.90	47.8
Poggio Rusco	Mantua	6,255	42.29	147.9
Poggiridenti	Sondrio	1,825	2.90	629.3
Pogliano Milanese	Milan	8,483	4.78	1,774.7
Pognana Lario	Como	657	5.07	129.6
Pognano	Bergamo	1,606	3.29	488.1
Polaveno	Brescia	2,531	9.20	275.1
Polpenazze del Garda	Brescia	2,735	9.12	299.9
Pompiano	Brescia	3,755	15.27	245.9
Pomponesco	Mantua	1,757	12.56	139.9
Poncarale	Brescia	5,192	12.64	410.8
Ponna	Como	223	5.81	38.4
Ponte di Legno	Brescia	1,756	100.43	17.5
Ponte in Valtellina	Sondrio	2,217	67.73	32.7
Ponte Lambro	Como	4,266	3.38	1,262.1
Ponte Nizza	Pavia	740	22.96	32.2
Ponte Nossa	Bergamo	1,798	5.59	321.6
Ponte San Pietro	Bergamo	12,007	4.59	2,615.9
Ponteranica	Bergamo	6,731	8.48	793.8
Pontevico	Brescia	7,131	29.21	244.1
Ponti sul Mincio	Mantua	2,277	11.72	194.3
Pontida	Bergamo	3,299	10.38	317.8
Pontirolo Nuovo	Bergamo	5,046	11.10	454.6
Pontoglio	Brescia	7,004	11.09	631.6
Porlezza	Como	4,901	18.64	262.9
Portalbera	Pavia	1,480	4.48	330.4
Porto Ceresio	Varese	2,785	5.34	521.5
Porto Mantovano	Mantua	16,715	37.44	446.4
Porto Valtravaglia	Varese	2,297	16.37	140.3
Postalesio	Sondrio	647	10.58	61.2
Pozzaglio ed Uniti	Cremona	1,416	20.40	69.4
Pozzo d'Adda	Milan	6,871	4.16	1,651.7
Pozzolengo	Brescia	3,577	21.33	167.7
Pozzuolo Martesana	Milan	8,828	12.14	727.2
Pradalunga	Bergamo	4,494	8.20	548.0
Pralboino	Brescia	2,850	17.16	166.1
Prata Camportaccio	Sondrio	2,942	27.94	105.3
Predore	Bergamo	1,847	10.96	168.5
Pregnana Milanese	Milan	7,331	5.07	1,446.0
Premana	Lecco	2,150	33.64	63.9
Premolo	Bergamo	1,064	17.63	60.4
Preseglie	Brescia	1,470	11.45	128.4
Presezzo	Bergamo	4,790	2.28	2,100.9
Prevalle	Brescia	6,902	9.99	690.9
Primaluna	Lecco	2,274	22.43	101.4
Proserpio	Como	951	2.30	413.5
Provaglio d'Iseo	Brescia	7,068	16.16	437.4
Provaglio Val Sabbia	Brescia	844	14.85	56.8
Puegnago sul Garda	Brescia	3,478	10.97	317.0
Pumenengo	Bergamo	1,731	10.12	171.0
Pusiano	Como	1,301	3.20	406.6
Quingentole	Mantua	1,016	14.38	70.7
Quintano	Cremona	932	2.86	325.9
Quinzano d'Oglio	Brescia	6,392	21.45	298.0
Quistello	Mantua	5,281	45.44	116.2
Rancio Valcuvia	Varese	911	4.45	204.7
Ranco	Varese	1,208	6.76	178.7
Ranica	Bergamo	5,828	4.06	1,435.5
Ranzanico	Bergamo	1,217	7.21	168.8
Rasura	Sondrio	277	6.00	46.2
Rea	Pavia	395	2.16	182.9
Redavalle	Pavia	1,050	5.42	193.7
Redondesco	Mantua	1,188	19.04	62.4
Remedello	Brescia	3,446	21.46	160.6
Renate	Monza and Brianza	3,983	2.89	1,378.2
Rescaldina	Milan	14,406	8.03	1,794.0
Retorbido	Pavia	1,511	11.67	129.5
Rezzago	Como	311	4.08	76.2
Rezzato	Brescia	13,592	18.21	746.4
Rho	Milan	51,000	22.24	2,293.2
Ricengo	Cremona	1,724	12.54	137.5
Ripalta Arpina	Cremona	1,088	6.96	156.3
Ripalta Cremasca	Cremona	3,454	11.78	293.2
Ripalta Guerina	Cremona	538	2.97	181.1
Riva di Solto	Bergamo	843	8.52	98.9
Rivanazzano Terme	Pavia	5,150	28.91	178.1
Rivarolo del Re ed Uniti	Cremona	1,848	27.33	67.6
Rivarolo Mantovano	Mantua	2,302	25.55	90.1
Rivolta d'Adda	Cremona	8,358	30.40	274.9
Robbiate	Lecco	6,441	4.70	1,370.4
Robbio	Pavia	6,016	40.54	148.4
Robecchetto con Induno	Milan	4,797	13.93	344.4
Robecco d'Oglio	Cremona	2,250	17.96	125.3
Robecco Pavese	Pavia	510	6.93	73.6
Robecco sul Naviglio	Milan	6,794	19.79	343.3
Rocca de' Giorgi	Pavia	37	10.50	3.5
Rocca Susella	Pavia	239	12.76	18.7
Roccafranca	Brescia	4,989	19.13	260.8
Rodano	Milan	4,709	13.07	360.3
Rodengo Saiano	Brescia	9,868	12.86	767.3
Rodero	Como	1,282	2.52	508.7
Rodigo	Mantua	5,174	41.61	124.3
Roè Volciano	Brescia	4,323	5.82	742.8
Rogeno	Lecco	3,050	4.82	632.8
Rognano	Pavia	708	9.36	75.6
Rogno	Bergamo	3,854	15.81	243.8
Rogolo	Sondrio	575	12.83	44.8
Romagnese	Pavia	528	29.72	17.8
Romanengo	Cremona	3,257	15.05	216.4
Romano di Lombardia	Bergamo	21,049	19.38	1,086.1
Roncadelle	Brescia	9,315	9.39	992.0
Roncaro	Pavia	1,533	5.05	303.6
Roncello	Monza and Brianza	4,772	3.16	1,510.1
Ronco Briantino	Monza and Brianza	3,777	2.97	1,271.7
Roncobello	Bergamo	421	25.39	16.6
Roncoferraro	Mantua	6,935	63.43	109.3
Roncola	Bergamo	901	5.07	177.7
Rosasco	Pavia	560	19.55	28.6
Rosate	Milan	5,641	18.68	302.0
Rota d'Imagna	Bergamo	940	6.03	155.9
Rovato	Brescia	19,746	26.09	756.8
Rovellasca	Como	8,028	3.57	2,248.7
Rovello Porro	Como	6,387	5.53	1,155.0
Roverbella	Mantua	8,714	62.99	138.3
Rovescala	Pavia	810	8.41	96.3
Rovetta	Bergamo	4,150	24.53	169.2
Rozzano	Milan	41,724	12.24	3,408.8
Rudiano	Brescia	5,910	9.85	600.0
Sabbio Chiese	Brescia	4,093	18.45	221.8
Sabbioneta	Mantua	4,076	37.27	109.4
Sala Comacina	Como	456	4.73	96.4
Sale Marasino	Brescia	3,238	16.59	195.2
Salerano sul Lambro	Lodi	2,690	4.38	614.2
Salò	Brescia	10,292	27.31	376.9
Saltrio	Varese	3,001	3.44	872.4
Salvirola	Cremona	1,143	7.36	155.3
Samarate	Varese	16,232	16.01	1,013.9
Samolaco	Sondrio	2,871	45.80	62.7
San Bartolomeo Val Cavargna	Como	926	10.51	88.1
San Bassano	Cremona	2,057	13.93	147.7
San Benedetto Po	Mantua	6,792	69.94	97.1
San Cipriano Po	Pavia	455	8.50	53.5
San Colombano al Lambro	Milan	7,591	16.55	458.7
San Damiano al Colle	Pavia	600	6.43	93.3
San Daniele Po	Cremona	1,297	22.69	57.2
San Donato Milanese	Milan	32,210	12.88	2,500.8
San Felice del Benaco	Brescia	3,468	20.22	171.5
San Fermo della Battaglia	Como	7,770	5.78	1,344.3
San Fiorano	Lodi	1,893	8.97	211.0
San Genesio ed Uniti	Pavia	4,053	9.27	437.2
San Gervasio Bresciano	Brescia	2,679	10.50	255.1
San Giacomo delle Segnate	Mantua	1,508	15.98	94.4
San Giacomo Filippo	Sondrio	371	61.85	6.0
San Giorgio Bigarello	Mantua	11,958	51.53	232.1
San Giorgio di Lomellina	Pavia	986	25.45	38.7
San Giorgio su Legnano	Milan	6,868	2.17	3,165.0
San Giovanni Bianco	Bergamo	4,569	31.03	147.2
San Giovanni del Dosso	Mantua	1,244	15.40	80.8
San Giovanni in Croce	Cremona	1,915	16.21	118.1
San Giuliano Milanese	Milan	40,227	30.87	1,303.1
San Martino dall'Argine	Mantua	1,604	16.94	94.7
San Martino del Lago	Cremona	384	10.38	37.0
San Martino in Strada	Lodi	3,776	13.15	287.1
San Martino Siccomario	Pavia	6,666	14.29	466.5
San Nazzaro Val Cavargna	Como	256	12.99	19.7
San Paolo	Brescia	4,490	18.82	238.6
San Paolo d'Argon	Bergamo	5,938	5.25	1,131.0
San Pellegrino Terme	Bergamo	4,597	22.95	200.3
San Rocco al Porto	Lodi	3,452	30.57	112.9
San Siro	Como	1,672	18.79	89.0
San Vittore Olona	Milan	8,450	3.49	2,421.2
San Zeno Naviglio	Brescia	4,733	6.25	757.3
San Zenone al Lambro	Milan	4,508	7.24	622.7
San Zenone al Po	Pavia	576	6.89	83.6
Sangiano	Varese	1,437	2.22	647.3
Sannazzaro de' Burgondi	Pavia	5,230	23.33	224.2
Sant'Alessio con Vialone	Pavia	1,058	6.56	161.3
Sant'Angelo Lodigiano	Lodi	13,577	20.05	677.2
Sant'Angelo Lomellina	Pavia	803	10.50	76.5
Sant'Omobono Terme	Bergamo	3,953	16.43	240.6
Santa Brigida	Bergamo	517	13.80	37.5
Santa Cristina e Bissone	Pavia	1,848	22.42	82.4
Santa Giuletta	Pavia	1,585	11.59	136.8
Santa Margherita di Staffora	Pavia	424	36.90	11.5
Santa Maria della Versa	Pavia	2,275	18.48	123.1
Santa Maria Hoè	Lecco	2,079	2.83	734.6
Santo Stefano Lodigiano	Lodi	1,852	10.53	175.9
Santo Stefano Ticino	Milan	4,983	4.97	1,002.6
Sarezzo	Brescia	13,309	17.68	752.8
Sarnico	Bergamo	6,858	6.66	1,029.7
Saronno	Varese	38,812	11.06	3,509.2
Sartirana Lomellina	Pavia	1,491	29.54	50.5
Saviore dell'Adamello	Brescia	787	84.27	9.3
Scaldasole	Pavia	853	11.57	73.7
Scandolara Ravara	Cremona	1,237	17.08	72.4
Scandolara Ripa d'Oglio	Cremona	505	5.72	88.3
Scanzorosciate	Bergamo	10,168	10.69	951.2
Schignano	Como	868	10.12	85.8
Schilpario	Bergamo	1,136	63.97	17.8
Schivenoglia	Mantua	1,135	12.96	87.6
Secugnago	Lodi	2,001	6.75	296.4
Sedriano	Milan	13,088	7.75	1,688.8
Sedrina	Bergamo	2,361	5.85	403.6
Segrate	Milan	37,194	17.49	2,126.6
Sellero	Brescia	1,380	14.47	95.4
Selvino	Bergamo	1,961	6.53	300.3
Semiana	Pavia	192	9.72	19.8
Senago	Milan	21,754	8.60	2,529.5
Seniga	Brescia	1,447	13.57	106.6
Senna Comasco	Como	3,174	2.79	1,137.6
Senna Lodigiana	Lodi	1,813	27.02	67.1
Seregno	Monza and Brianza	45,240	13.05	3,466.7
Sergnano	Cremona	3,460	12.31	281.1
Seriate	Bergamo	25,857	12.53	2,063.6
Serina	Bergamo	2,107	27.34	77.1
Serle	Brescia	3,126	18.43	169.6
Sermide e Felonica	Mantua	7,040	79.83	88.2
Sernio	Sondrio	500	9.52	52.5
Serravalle a Po	Mantua	1,474	26.20	56.3
Sesto Calende	Varese	10,998	25.04	439.2
Sesto ed Uniti	Cremona	3,286	26.49	124.0
Sesto San Giovanni	Milan	78,850	11.70	6,739.3
Settala	Milan	7,447	17.42	427.5
Settimo Milanese	Milan	20,002	10.72	1,865.9
Seveso	Monza and Brianza	23,982	7.40	3,240.8
Silvano Pietra	Pavia	622	13.67	45.5
Sirmione	Brescia	8,454	26.25	322.1
Sirone	Lecco	2,333	3.21	726.8
Sirtori	Lecco	2,790	4.29	650.3
Siziano	Pavia	6,921	11.79	587.0
Soiano del Lago	Brescia	1,953	5.77	338.5
Solaro	Milan	14,260	6.68	2,134.7
Solarolo Rainerio	Cremona	921	11.43	80.6
Solbiate Arno	Varese	4,047	3.03	1,335.6
Solbiate con Cagno	Como	4,638	7.62	608.7
Solbiate Olona	Varese	5,377	4.93	1,090.7
Solferino	Mantua	2,639	13.08	201.8
Solto Collina	Bergamo	1,836	11.76	156.1
Solza	Bergamo	2,009	1.23	1,633.3
Somaglia	Lodi	3,864	20.82	185.6
Somma Lombardo	Varese	17,931	30.51	587.7
Sommo	Pavia	1,117	14.87	75.1
Soncino	Cremona	7,554	45.32	166.7
Sondalo	Sondrio	3,859	95.45	40.4
Sondrio	Sondrio	21,495	20.88	1,029.5
Songavazzo	Bergamo	732	12.94	56.6
Sonico	Brescia	1,186	60.89	19.5
Sordio	Lodi	3,444	2.82	1,221.3
Soresina	Cremona	9,306	28.57	325.7
Sorico	Como	1,243	24.44	50.9
Sorisole	Bergamo	8,757	12.25	714.9
Sormano	Como	692	10.74	64.4
Sospiro	Cremona	3,041	18.96	160.4
Sotto il Monte Giovanni XXIII	Bergamo	4,431	5.02	882.7
Sovere	Bergamo	5,310	18.02	294.7
Sovico	Monza and Brianza	8,313	3.26	2,550.0
Spessa	Pavia	567	12.23	46.4
Spinadesco	Cremona	1,485	17.21	86.3
Spineda	Cremona	608	10.11	60.1
Spino d'Adda	Cremona	7,013	20.02	350.3
Spinone al Lago	Bergamo	1,006	1.97	510.7
Spirano	Bergamo	5,737	9.61	597.0
Spriana	Sondrio	85	7.69	11.1
Stagno Lombardo	Cremona	1,402	40.20	34.9
Stazzona	Como	593	7.29	81.3
Stezzano	Bergamo	13,904	9.37	1,483.9
Stradella	Pavia	11,729	18.84	622.6
Strozza	Bergamo	1,093	3.83	285.4
Suardi	Pavia	573	9.85	58.2
Sueglio	Lecco	157	4.11	38.2
Suello	Lecco	1,704	2.63	647.9
Suisio	Bergamo	3,785	4.54	833.7
Sulbiate	Monza and Brianza	4,532	5.20	871.5
Sulzano	Brescia	1,941	10.44	185.9
Sumirago	Varese	5,978	11.75	508.8
Sustinente	Mantua	1,986	26.27	75.6
Suzzara	Mantua	21,318	61.10	348.9
Taceno	Lecco	595	3.75	158.7
Taino	Varese	3,554	7.63	465.8
Talamona	Sondrio	4,582	21.05	217.7
Taleggio	Bergamo	537	47.13	11.4
Tartano	Sondrio	198	47.27	4.2
Tavazzano con Villavesco	Lodi	6,098	16.07	379.5
Tavernerio	Como	5,586	11.91	469.0
Tavernola Bergamasca	Bergamo	1,918	11.17	171.7
Tavernole sul Mella	Brescia	1,200	19.81	60.6
Teglio	Sondrio	4,683	115.32	40.6
Telgate	Bergamo	5,025	8.30	605.4
Temù	Brescia	1,154	43.26	26.7
Ternate	Varese	2,556	4.68	546.2
Terno d'Isola	Bergamo	7,976	4.13	1,931.2
Terranova dei Passerini	Lodi	952	11.26	84.5
Ticengo	Cremona	455	7.98	57.0
Tignale	Brescia	1,158	45.86	25.3
Tirano	Sondrio	8,849	32.37	273.4
Torbole Casaglia	Brescia	6,488	13.44	482.7
Torlino Vimercati	Cremona	451	5.77	78.2
Tornata	Cremona	400	10.17	39.3
Torno	Como	1,030	7.53	136.8
Torrazza Coste	Pavia	1,602	16.23	98.7
Torre Beretti e Castellaro	Pavia	489	17.66	27.7
Torre Boldone	Bergamo	8,721	3.48	2,506.0
Torre d'Arese	Pavia	942	4.49	209.8
Torre d'Isola	Pavia	2,497	16.44	151.9
Torre de' Busi	Bergamo	2,321	8.97	258.8
Torre de' Negri	Pavia	332	4.01	82.8
Torre de' Picenardi	Cremona	2,183	34.23	63.8
Torre de' Roveri	Bergamo	2,614	2.69	971.7
Torre di Santa Maria	Sondrio	712	44.24	16.1
Torre Pallavicina	Bergamo	1,154	10.62	108.7
Torrevecchia Pia	Pavia	3,539	16.50	214.5
Torricella del Pizzo	Cremona	585	23.23	25.2
Torricella Verzate	Pavia	796	3.63	219.3
Toscolano-Maderno	Brescia	7,655	58.17	131.6
Tovo di Sant'Agata	Sondrio	611	11.15	54.8
Tradate	Varese	19,101	21.48	889.2
Traona	Sondrio	2,903	6.37	455.7
Travacò Siccomario	Pavia	4,427	17.05	259.6
Travagliato	Brescia	14,007	17.74	789.6
Travedona-Monate	Varese	3,868	9.60	402.9
Tremezzina	Como	4,942	29.41	168.0
Tremosine sul Garda	Brescia	2,141	72.69	29.5
Trenzano	Brescia	5,556	20.10	276.4
Trescore Balneario	Bergamo	9,922	13.51	734.4
Trescore Cremasco	Cremona	2,916	5.92	492.6
Tresivio	Sondrio	2,038	15.01	135.8
Treviglio	Bergamo	31,604	32.22	980.9
Treviolo	Bergamo	10,923	8.49	1,286.6
Treviso Bresciano	Brescia	522	17.73	29.4
Trezzano Rosa	Milan	5,444	3.44	1,582.6
Trezzano sul Naviglio	Milan	21,875	10.77	2,031.1
Trezzo sull'Adda	Milan	12,442	13.05	953.4
Trezzone	Como	231	3.91	59.1
Tribiano	Milan	3,931	7.00	561.6
Trigolo	Cremona	1,648	16.06	102.6
Triuggio	Monza and Brianza	8,776	8.34	1,052.3
Trivolzio	Pavia	2,494	3.83	651.2
Tromello	Pavia	3,772	35.50	106.3
Tronzano Lago Maggiore	Varese	221	11.06	20.0
Trovo	Pavia	1,000	8.16	122.5
Truccazzano	Milan	5,810	21.98	264.3
Turano Lodigiano	Lodi	1,576	16.38	96.2
Turate	Como	9,911	10.28	964.1
Turbigo	Milan	7,276	8.52	854.0
Ubiale Clanezzo	Bergamo	1,316	7.35	179.0
Uboldo	Varese	11,139	10.74	1,037.2
Uggiate-Trevano	Como	6,825	7.87	867.2
Urago d'Oglio	Brescia	3,829	10.68	358.5
Urgnano	Bergamo	10,140	14.78	686.1
Usmate Velate	Monza and Brianza	10,740	9.75	1,101.5
Vaiano Cremasco	Cremona	3,592	6.15	584.1
Vailate	Cremona	4,723	9.69	487.4
Val Brembilla	Bergamo	4,114	31.44	130.9
Val di Nizza	Pavia	571	29.68	19.2
Val Masino	Sondrio	825	116.71	7.1
Val Rezzo	Como	172	6.61	26.0
Valbondione	Bergamo	941	96.89	9.7
Valbrembo	Bergamo	4,299	3.80	1,131.3
Valbrona	Como	2,622	13.65	192.1
Valdidentro	Sondrio	4,107	226.73	18.1
Valdisotto	Sondrio	3,529	89.57	39.4
Valeggio	Pavia	192	9.85	19.5
Valera Fratta	Lodi	1,698	8.01	212.0
Valfurva	Sondrio	2,431	215.02	11.3
Valganna	Varese	1,591	12.42	128.1
Valgoglio	Bergamo	554	31.89	17.4
Valgreghentino	Lecco	3,357	6.25	537.1
Valle Lomellina	Pavia	2,229	27.24	81.8
Valle Salimbene	Pavia	1,425	7.16	199.0
Valleve	Bergamo	129	14.76	8.7
Vallio Terme	Brescia	1,438	14.86	96.8
Valmadrera	Lecco	11,233	12.60	891.5
Valmorea	Como	2,595	3.13	829.1
Valnegra	Bergamo	198	2.23	88.8
Valsolda	Como	1,434	31.74	45.2
Valtorta	Bergamo	228	30.90	7.4
Valvarrone	Lecco	499	14.93	33.4
Valvestino	Brescia	169	31.12	5.4
Vanzaghello	Milan	5,394	5.56	970.1
Vanzago	Milan	9,372	6.05	1,549.1
Vaprio d'Adda	Milan	9,723	7.15	1,359.9
Varano Borghi	Varese	2,492	3.33	748.3
Varedo	Monza and Brianza	14,039	4.85	2,894.6
Varenna	Lecco	646	12.57	51.4
Varese	Varese	79,100	54.84	1,442.4
Varzi	Pavia	3,073	57.61	53.3
Vedano al Lambro	Monza and Brianza	7,363	1.98	3,718.7
Vedano Olona	Varese	7,452	7.08	1,052.5
Vedeseta	Bergamo	196	19.29	10.2
Veduggio con Colzano	Monza and Brianza	4,182	3.56	1,174.7
Veleso	Como	195	5.86	33.3
Velezzo Lomellina	Pavia	82	8.17	10.0
Vellezzo Bellini	Pavia	3,528	8.20	430.2
Venegono Inferiore	Varese	5,922	5.88	1,007.1
Venegono Superiore	Varese	7,522	6.73	1,117.7
Veniano	Como	3,157	3.15	1,002.2
Verano Brianza	Monza and Brianza	9,126	3.52	2,592.6
Vercana	Como	732	15.01	48.8
Verceia	Sondrio	1,091	11.38	95.9
Vercurago	Lecco	2,671	2.12	1,259.9
Verdellino	Bergamo	7,843	3.82	2,053.1
Verdello	Bergamo	8,212	7.34	1,118.8
Verderio	Lecco	5,516	6.47	852.6
Vergiate	Varese	8,646	21.78	397.0
Vermezzo	Milan	5,987	10.74	557.4
Vernate	Milan	3,436	14.65	234.5
Verolanuova	Brescia	8,168	25.76	317.1
Verolavecchia	Brescia	3,893	21.06	184.9
Verretto	Pavia	380	2.71	140.2
Verrua Po	Pavia	1,213	11.44	106.0
Vertemate con Minoprio	Como	4,189	5.75	728.5
Vertova	Bergamo	4,457	15.69	284.1
Vervio	Sondrio	204	12.41	16.4
Vescovato	Cremona	3,994	17.44	229.0
Vestone	Brescia	4,143	12.96	319.7
Vezza d'Oglio	Brescia	1,461	54.15	27.0
Viadana	Mantua	19,787	103.84	190.6
Viadanica	Bergamo	1,121	5.45	205.7
Vidigulfo	Pavia	6,821	16.14	422.6
Viganò	Lecco	2,108	1.60	1,317.5
Vigano San Martino	Bergamo	1,400	3.76	372.3
Vigevano	Pavia	63,480	81.37	780.1
Viggiù	Varese	5,150	9.26	556.2
Vignate	Milan	9,369	8.55	1,095.8
Vigolo	Bergamo	571	12.31	46.4
Villa Biscossi	Pavia	68	4.88	13.9
Villa Carcina	Brescia	10,721	14.22	753.9
Villa Cortese	Milan	6,333	3.55	1,783.9
Villa d'Adda	Bergamo	4,580	5.98	765.9
Villa d'Almè	Bergamo	6,428	6.49	990.4
Villa d'Ogna	Bergamo	1,784	5.16	345.7
Villa di Chiavenna	Sondrio	992	32.52	30.5
Villa di Serio	Bergamo	6,490	4.60	1,410.9
Villa di Tirano	Sondrio	3,013	24.74	121.8
Villa Guardia	Como	7,867	7.87	999.6
Villachiara	Brescia	1,355	16.87	80.3
Villanova d'Ardenghi	Pavia	762	6.61	115.3
Villanova del Sillaro	Lodi	1,899	13.50	140.7
Villanterio	Pavia	3,441	14.77	233.0
Villanuova sul Clisi	Brescia	5,929	9.10	651.5
Villasanta	Monza and Brianza	14,305	4.86	2,943.4
Villimpenta	Mantua	2,152	14.85	144.9
Villongo	Bergamo	8,169	6.04	1,352.5
Vilminore di Scalve	Bergamo	1,423	41.00	34.7
Vimercate	Monza and Brianza	26,341	20.72	1,271.3
Vimodrone	Milan	16,933	4.74	3,572.4
Vione	Brescia	621	35.27	17.6
Visano	Brescia	2,020	11.22	180.0
Vistarino	Pavia	1,595	9.49	168.1
Vittuone	Milan	9,312	6.13	1,519.1
Vizzola Ticino	Varese	594	7.61	78.1
Vizzolo Predabissi	Milan	3,852	5.65	681.8
Vobarno	Brescia	8,485	53.22	159.4
Voghera	Pavia	40,220	63.44	634.0
Volongo	Cremona	455	8.12	56.0
Volpara	Pavia	131	3.77	34.7
Volta Mantovana	Mantua	7,248	50.49	143.6
Voltido	Cremona	334	12.24	27.3
Zandobbio	Bergamo	2,737	6.43	425.7
Zanica	Bergamo	8,839	14.95	591.2
Zavattarello	Pavia	881	28.40	31.0
Zeccone	Pavia	1,717	5.53	310.5
Zelbio	Como	182	4.60	39.6
Zelo Buon Persico	Lodi	7,434	18.88	393.8
Zeme	Pavia	983	24.58	40.0
Zenevredo	Pavia	481	5.40	89.1
Zerbo	Pavia	407	6.36	64.0
Zerbolò	Pavia	1,714	37.19	46.1
Zibido San Giacomo	Milan	6,643	24.58	270.3
Zinasco	Pavia	3,191	29.74	107.3
Zogno	Bergamo	8,590	35.21	244.0
Zone	Brescia	1,041	19.68	52.9

== See also ==
- List of municipalities of Italy
