= Riviera di Salò =

The Riviera di Salò (Note: fficially known as the Comunità della Riviera bresciana del lago di Garda in Italian and the Communitas Riperiæ Lacus Gardæ Brixiensis in Latin, both meaning Community of the Brescian Riviera of Lake Garda.) was a confederation of towns along the Brescian riviera of Lake Garda and of part of the Valle Sabbia. During Venetian rule of the area the Venetian Senate gave it the title of Magnifica and Firstborn Daughter of the Most Serene [Republic], leading it still to be known as the Magnifica Patria of the Riviera di Salò. Its inhabitants were known as "Quelli di Salò" (Those of Salò). It was dissolved in 1797.

== History ==
=== Origins ===
On 4 November 1334 the 34 towns on the river bank and on part of the Val Sabbia founded the community, basing it initially in Maderno. It operated as a sort of federation ruled by a podestà. Unwilling to ally with either Brescia or Verona, they instead reached out to the Venetian Republic, which sent a provveditore.

=== Visconti rule ===
In 1350 the riverbank fell under the control of the Visconti, given that Venice could not protect such a long territory. In 1362 Scaliger troops besieged Salò and that town's resistance (along with its warm welcome to Beatrice Visconti) led to the confederation's capital moving there from Maderno. On Gian Galeazzo Visconti's rise to power Maderno briefly resumed its status as capital but soon lost it again during the drafting of the statutes. On the Duke's death the representatives of Salò and the Riviera held fifth place in the funeral procession, a long way ahead of the representatives from Verona and Brescia.

=== Back to Venice ===
In 1428 Salò and the Riviera returned to the Venetian sphere by motu proprio of the Comunità itself, abandoning the Visconti just before the siege of Brescia. In the following years the Riviera often turned back to the Visconti and so Venice placed it under the jurisdiction of Brescia, which had remained loyal to Venice. Only in 1443 did the Riviera gain independence from Brescia, albeit only partially, and the ability to welcome to Lake Garda the Captain of the Riviera and the Provveditore of Salò chosen by the Venetian Senate.

In this period Venice bestowed the titles of 'Magnifica' and 'Firstborn Daughter of the Most Serene Republic', along with several autonomies, making it almost a state in its own right. The French and Spanish conquered it during the War of the League of Cambrai, but the occupiers were disliked by the locals, who soon took to flying the banner of Saint Mark again. It also sent a shipful of men-at-arms on 23 April 1570 to join the fleet gathering against the Ottoman Empire, seeing action at the Battle of Lepanto.

=== Ending ===
The arrival of Napoleon Bonaparte's troops at Salò on 17 August 1796 marked the beginning of the end for the Riviera confederation. On 25 March new arrived of rebellion against the French occupiers in Brescia. The town's inhabitants initially welcomed the news but - with the Brescians leaving - they decided to stay loyal to Venice. They too therefore revolted, in the only such revolt officially supported by Venice.

Troops raised from local Jacobins in Brescia and Bergamo attacked the Golfo but were repulsed and captured thanks to intervention from inhabitants of the Val Sabia. On 20 May Salò had to surrender to the French, who stripped it of its title as capital and its independence from Brescia.

== Government ==
It was governed by a community council composed of 36 councillors, half of whom took office in January and the other half in July. Each quadra sent six councillors. From these, six deputies were elected quarterly, one per quadra, who were responsible for effectively governing the confederation. No counsellor could be related to any other or to the special syndic or mayor, either directly (fathers, sons, or brothers) or indirectly (brothers-in-law, fathers-in-law, sons-in-law). Once their term expired, they could not be re-elected for at least one year. Both outgoing and incoming councillors were present at the first meetings in January and July, giving a total of 56 councillors. The special syndic or mayor had to have a university degree and had to attend all community councils so that he could oppose any proposal presented by the deputies, but he could not vote.

=== Administrative subdivisions ===
It was divided into six 'quadre':

Quadra	Towns	Towns (modern names)
Gargnano	Gargnano; Trimosigno; Limone (Latin: Limones Sancti Ioannis)	Gargnano; Tremosine; Limone sul Garda
Maderno	Maderno; Gardone (Latin: Garda); Tuscolano; Rovina	merged with Toscolano Maderno; Gardone Riviera; merged with Toscolano Maderno; Roina, a district of Toscolano Maderno
Salò	Salò (Latin: Salodium); Caccavero; Volciano	Salò; Campoverde, merged with Salò; Roè Volciano
Montagna	Hidro; Cazzi; Sabbio; Boarno; Hano; Degagna; Provaglio di Sopra; Provaglio di Sotto; Teglie	Idro; Treviso Bresciano; Sabbio Chiese; Vobarno; Capovalle; a district of Vobarno; merged with Provaglio Val Sabbia; merged with Provaglio Val Sabbia; a district of Vobarno
Val di Tenese (Note: Now Val Tenesi.)	Manerba; Santo Felice; Raffa; Polpenazze; Puvignano; Portese; Moniga; Soiano	Manerba del Garda; San Felice del Benaco; district of Puegnago del Garda; Polpenazze del Garda; Puegnago del Garda; district of San Felice del Benaco; Moniga del Garda; Soiano del Lago
Campagna	Moscoline; Bedizzuole; Padenghe; Calvagese; Carzago; Desenzano; Rivoltella; Pozzolengo	Muscoline; Bedizzole; Padenghe sul Garda; Calvagese della Riviera; Carzago Riviera, a district of Calvagese della Riviera; Desenzano del Garda; district of Desenzano del Garda; Pozzolengo

Arzaga, Botonago, Burago, Drugolo, Maguzzano, Muslone and Venzago were independent towns; the town of Tignale enjoyed the same prerogatives as a quadra.

== Economy ==
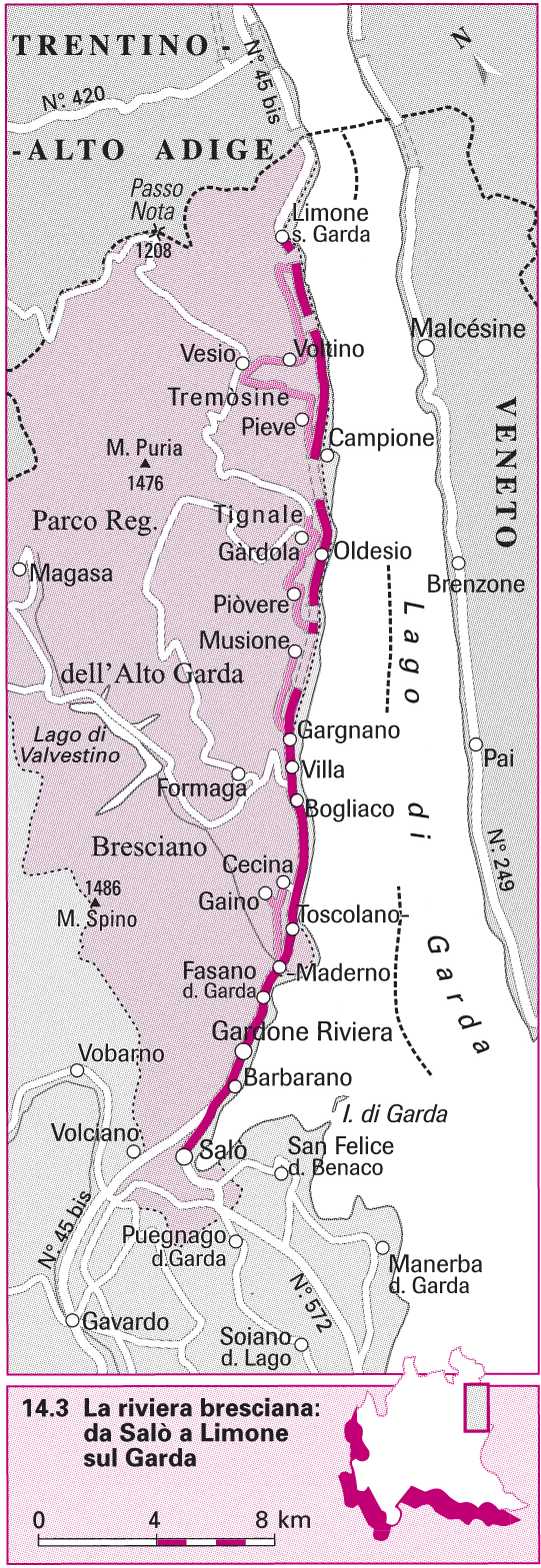
Map of the riviera from Salò to Limone

== Bibliography (in Italian) ==
- Redomonte Domenicetti, Descrizione della Riviera di Salò, Salò, Ateneo di Salò e Associazione Sommolago, 2000.
- Bongianni Gratarolo, Storia della Riviera di Salò, Salò, Ateneo di Salò e Associazione Sommolago, 2000.
- Fabrizio Pagnoni; Enrico Valseriati; Luca Giarelli (2013). "Tra la Serpe e il Leone: l'autonomia della Riviera bresciana del Garda nel tardo medioevo (secoli XIV e XV)". Naturalmente divisi. Storia e autonomia delle antiche comunità alpine. p. 85. ISBN 978-88-911-1170-8.
- Giuseppe Solitro, Benaco, Salò, Gio. Devoti Editore, 1897.

=== Statutes of the confederation ===
- Statuta datiaria, criminalia et civilia totius communitatis Riperiae Lacus Baenaci Brixiensis (in Latin). Venezia: Giovanni Antonio Nicolini de Sabio. 1536.
- Statuta criminalia et civilia Riperiae (in Latin). Salò: Bernardino Lantono. 1620.
- Giovanni Rossi, ed. (1626). Statuti criminali et ciuili della magnifica communità della Riuiera (in Italian). Salò: Bernardino Lantoni.
- Statuta datiaria comunitatis Riperiae (in Latin). Salò: eredi di Antonio Cominc. 1656.
- Statuti criminali et ciuili della magnifica communità della riuiera (in Italian). Salò: Eredi Comincioli. 1674.
- Statuta criminalia et civilia Riperiae (in Latin). Salò: Eredi di Antonio Comincioli. 1675.
