= Vestone =

Vestone Vistù (Lombard)
- Comune
- Comune di Vestone
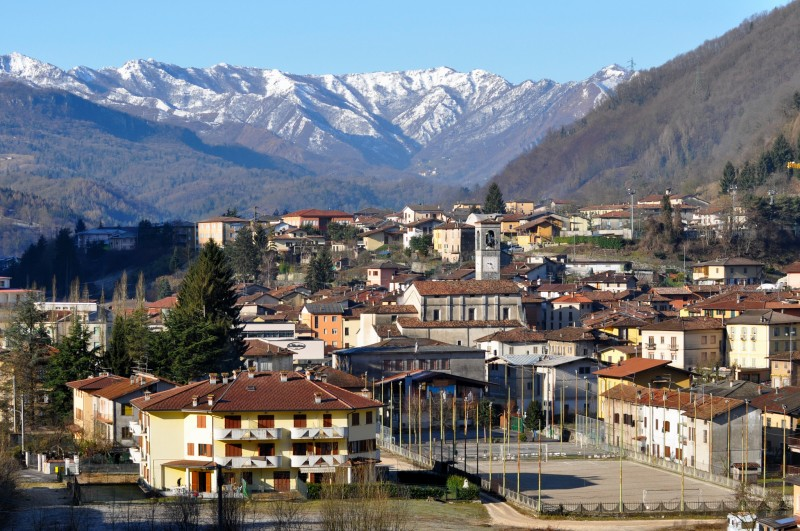

- Location within Italy Location within Lombardy
- Coordinates: 45°42′N 10°24′E
- Country: Italy
- Region: Lombardy
- Province: Brescia (BS)
- Frazioni: Nozza

Area
  - Total: 12.90 km^{2} (4.98 sq mi)
- Elevation: 318 m (1,043 ft)

Population (2011)
  - Total: 4,477
  - Density: 347.1/km^{2} (898.9/sq mi)
- Demonym: Vestonesi
- Time zone: UTC+1 (CET)
  - Summer (DST): UTC+2 (CEST)
- Postal code: 25078
- Dialing code: 0365
- ISTAT code: 017197
- Website: Official website

Vestone (Brescian: Vistù) is a comune in the province of Brescia, in Lombardy, Italy. It is situated on the river Chiese. Neighboring communes are Barghe, Bione, Casto, Lavenone, Mura, Pertica Alta, Pertica Bassa, Preseglie, Provaglio Val Sabbia and Treviso Bresciano. Its population is 4,340.
