= Preseglie =

Preseglie Presèi
- Comune
- Comune di Preseglie
- Location within Italy Location within Lombardy
- Coordinates: 45°40′N 10°24′E
- Country: Italy
- Region: Lombardy
- Province: Brescia (BS)
- Frazioni: Agnosine, Barghe, Bione, Odolo, Sabbio Chiese, Vestone

Area
  - Total: 11 km^{2} (4.2 sq mi)

Population (2011)
  - Total: 1,588
  - Density: 140/km^{2} (370/sq mi)
- Time zone: UTC+1 (CET)
  - Summer (DST): UTC+2 (CEST)
- Postal code: 25070
- Dialing code: 0365
- ISTAT code: 017153
- Website: Official website

Preseglie (Brescian: Presèi) is a comune in the province of Brescia, in Lombardy.
