= Simone Zanoni =

Italian chef

- Born: 25 June 1976 (age 49); Salò, Italy
- Culinary career
- Rating: Michelin stars
- Current restaurant: Le George (Paris)

Simone Zanoni (born 25 June 1976) is an Italian chef. He is the chef at Le George in Paris, which has a Michelin star and is one of three restaurants at the Four Seasons Hotel George V. Previously, he was a chef at restaurants owned by Gordon Ramsay.

== Early life and education ==
Simone Zanoni was born in Salò and grew up in Lombardy on a farm at Provaglio Val Sabbia, near Lake Garda. He was introduced to cooking at a young age, as his family made its own charcuterie, vegetables and cheeses. During the summer, he visited his grandparents to help make cheese and tortellini. Zanoni says his grandmother taught him about the technical side of cooking.

On the advice of his father, he followed cooking studies at the Istituto Alberghiero polivalente in Idro. He worked on weekends in a cooking team on Lake Garda.

== Career ==
After graduating at the age of 18, Zanoni moved to London to learn English. He began working in a trattoria called the Mediterraneo, while taking classes at Le Cordon Bleu. Later, he started work as an assistant in Gordon Ramsay's Michelin-starred restaurant Aubergine, later becoming chef de partie. In January 2001, he became a sous-chef at several of Ramsay's restaurants, including Amarylis (one Michelin star), Pétrus (two Michelin stars) and Claridge's (one Michelin star).

In 2003, Zanoni briefly returned to Italy, working at Dal Pescatore in Canneto sull'Oglio. That August, after the death of the chef David Dempsey, he was appointed head chef of Restaurant Gordon Ramsay in London, which was the city's only restaurant with three Michelin stars. In 2007, Zanoni relocated to Versailles, to become the executive chef at the two-Michelin-starred Restaurant Gordon Ramsay at the Trianon Palace.

In September 2016, he was appointed head chef of Le George, a Mediterranean restaurant at the Hotel George V in Paris. Opened in October 2015 as the hotel's second restaurant after Le Cinq, Le George was awarded a Michelin star in 2017.

In 2017, Zanoni created a 3,000 m^{2} vegetable garden for the restaurant, at the Domain of Montreuil in the Yvelines. The garden is maintained by a team of 5 gardeners, including people in professional reinsertion. Engaged in the preservation of the environment and for a "reasoned" gastronomy, Simone Zanoni created a bio-virtuous system, where waste from Le George is transformed into compost and used to nourish the soil of the garden.

He was also chef of the kasher restaurant Le Rafaël in Paris, which opened in 2014. It has since closed. He also opened a pizzeria in Versailles named Pizzeria César by Simone Zanoni.

== Other activities ==
Zanoni is passionate about cars and an ambassador for Porsche.

== Publications ==
- Zanoni Conseils, ed. (2020). Le confinement d'un Chef (in French). ISBN 979-10-699-5284-3.
- La Martinière, ed. (11 October 2018). Mon Italie - 100 produits, 120 recettes, voyages au cœur du terroir (in French). ISBN 2732480029.
- Flammarion, ed. (21 October 2015). Haute cuisine (in French). ISBN 2081370298.
