= Treviso Bresciano =

- Comune
- Comune di Treviso Bresciano
- Location within Italy Location within Lombardy
- Coordinates: 45°43′N 10°28′E
- Country: Italy
- Region: Lombardy
- Province: Brescia (BS)
- Frazioni: Capovalle, Idro, Lavenone, Provaglio Val Sabbia, Vestone, Vobarno

Area
  - Total: 17 km^{2} (6.6 sq mi)

Population (2011)
  - Total: 560
  - Density: 33/km^{2} (85/sq mi)
- Demonym: Trevigiani
- Time zone: UTC+1 (CET)
  - Summer (DST): UTC+2 (CEST)
- Postal code: 25070
- Dialing code: 0365
- ISTAT code: 017191
- Patron saint: Saint Martino
- Saint day: 11 November

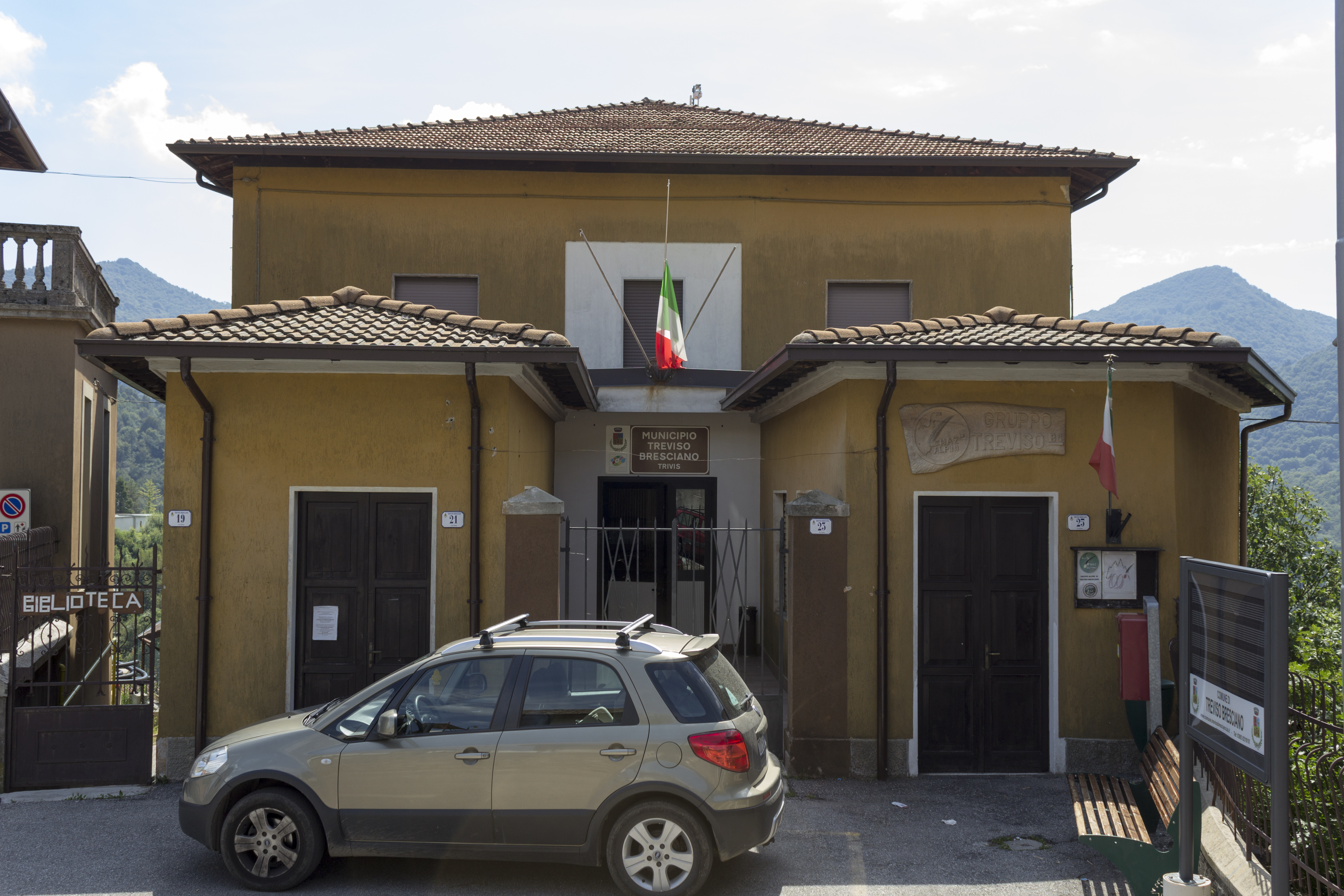
Town hall of Treviso Bresciano

Treviso Bresciano (Brescian: Trevìs) is a comune in the province of Brescia, in Lombardy.
