= Vallio Terme =

- Comune
- Comune di Vallio Terme
- Location within Italy Location within Lombardy
- Coordinates: 45°37′N 10°24′E
- Country: Italy
- Region: Lombardy
- Province: Province of Brescia (BS)

Government
  - Mayor: Pietro Neboli (center-left)

Area
  - Total: 15 km^{2} (5.8 sq mi)

Population (2011)
  - Total: 1,382
  - Density: 92/km^{2} (240/sq mi)
- Time zone: UTC+1 (CET)
  - Summer (DST): UTC+2 (CEST)
- Postal code: 25080
- Dialing code: 0365

Vallio Terme (Brescian: Vai) is a comune in the province of Brescia, in Lombardy. Neighbouring communes are Agnosine, Caino, Gavardo, Odolo, Paitone, Sabbio Chiese and Serle.
