= Giovanni Veronese =

Italian mathematician

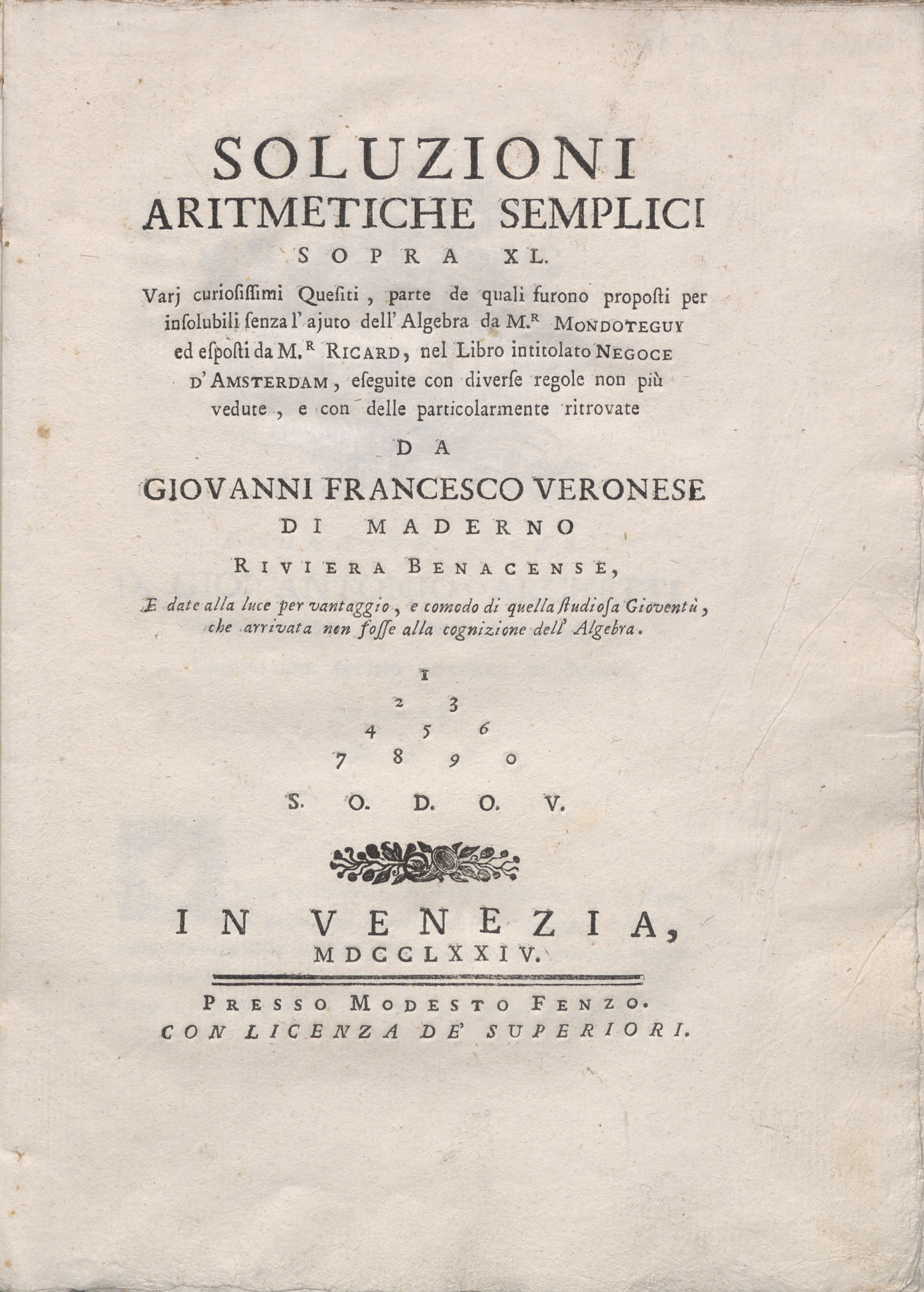
Soluzioni aritmetiche semplici, 1774

Giovanni Francesco Veronese was an 18th-century Italian mathematician from Maderno.

== Life ==
In 1774 Veronesi published in Venice his own Simple Arithmetic Solutions (Soluzioni aritmetiche semplici) to forty "various very curious questions" of mathematics, previously declared "insoluble without the help of algebra" by Jacques de Mondoteguy and exposed by Jean-Pierre Ricard in the 1722 essay Négoce d'Amsterdam.

== Works ==
- Soluzioni aritmetiche semplici sopra XL. varj curiosissimi quesiti... (in Italian). Venezia: Modesto Fenzo. 1774.
