= Orto Botanico "G.E. Ghirardi" =

Botanical garden in Italy

Coordinates: 45°39′N 10°37′E

The Orto Botanico "G.E. Ghirardi" (about 10,000 m^{2}), also known as the Giardino Botanico sperimentale "E. Ghirardi" and the Orto botanico di Toscolano Maderno, is a botanical garden operated by the University of Milan, and located on Via Religione, Toscolano-Maderno on the western shore of Lake Garda, Province of Brescia, Lombardy, Italy.

The garden was established in 1964 as the Stazione Agricola Sperimentale Mimosa under the direction of Professor Giordano Emilio Ghirardi. In 1991 it became part of the University of Milan, and today primarily cultivates plants of interest for medicine and pharmaceutics, but also supports research in transgenic plants, rice, etc. Collections include Camptotheca acuminata, Eschscholzia, Nicotiana, Nigella, Scutellaria, and Solanaceae.

== See also ==
- List of botanical gardens in Italy
