= San Damiano al Colle =

- Comune
- Comune di San Damiano al Colle
- Location within Italy Location within Lombardy
- Coordinates: 45°4′N 9°21′E
- Country: Italy
- Region: Lombardy
- Province: Province of Pavia (PV)

Area
  - Total: 6.4 km^{2} (2.5 sq mi)

Population (Dec. 2004)
  - Total: 767
  - Density: 120/km^{2} (310/sq mi)
- Time zone: UTC+1 (CET)
  - Summer (DST): UTC+2 (CEST)
- Postal code: 27040
- Dialing code: 0385

San Damiano al Colle is a comune (municipality) in the Province of Pavia in the Italian region Lombardy, located about 45 km (28 mi) southeast of Milan and about 20 km (12 mi) southeast of Pavia. As of 31 December 2004, it had a population of 767 and an area of 6.4 km^{2} (2.5 sq mi).

San Damiano al Colle borders the following municipalities: Bosnasco, Castel San Giovanni, Montù Beccaria, Rovescala.

== Demographic evolution ==
Historical population

Year	Pop.	±%
1861	1,955	—
1871	2,105	+7.7%
1881	2,182	+3.7%
1901	2,300	+5.4%
1911	2,013	−12.5%

Year	Pop.	±%
1921	2,003	−0.5%
1931	1,842	−8.0%
1936	1,807	−1.9%
1951	1,625	−10.1%
1961	1,379	−15.1%

Year	Pop.	±%
1971	1,092	−20.8%
1981	918	−15.9%
1991	822	−10.5%
2001	738	−10.2%

Source: Data from ISTAT
