= Mura, Lombardy =

Mura Müra
- Comune
- Comune di Mura
- Location within Italy Location within Lombardy
- Coordinates: 45°43′N 10°21′E
- Country: Italy
- Region: Lombardy
- Province: Brescia (BS)
- Frazioni: Casto, Pertica Alta, Vestone

Area
  - Total: 12 km^{2} (4.6 sq mi)

Population (2011)
  - Total: 789
  - Density: 66/km^{2} (170/sq mi)
- Time zone: UTC+1 (CET)
  - Summer (DST): UTC+2 (CEST)
- Postal code: 25070
- Dialing code: 0364
- ISTAT code: 017115

Mura (Brescian: Müra) is a town and comune in the province of Brescia, in Lombardy.
