= Toscolano Maderno =

Toscolano Maderno Toscolà Madéren (Lombard)
- Comune
- Comune di Toscolano Maderno
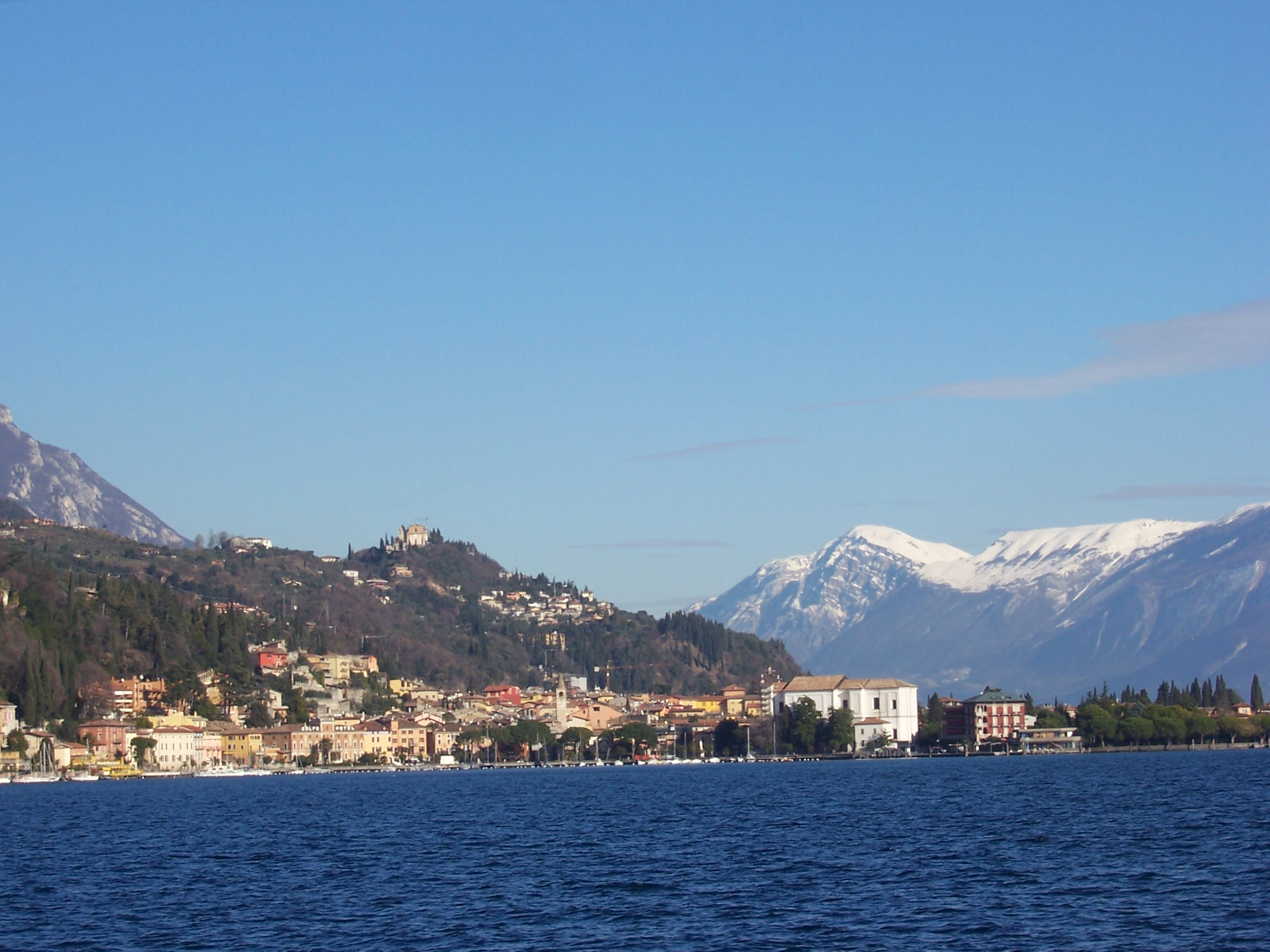
- View of Maderno.

- Coat of arms

- Location within Italy Location within Lombardy
- Coordinates: 45°39′N 10°37′E
- Country: Italy
- Region: Lombardy
- Province: Brescia (BS)
- Frazioni: Gaino, Cecina, Vigole, Sanico, Bornico, Roina, Maclino

Government
  - Mayor: Delia Castellini

Area
  - Total: 56 km^{2} (22 sq mi)
- Elevation: 86 m (282 ft)

Population (30 April 2017)
  - Total: 7,877
  - Density: 140/km^{2} (360/sq mi)
- Demonym: Toscomadernesi
- Time zone: UTC+1 (CET)
  - Summer (DST): UTC+2 (CEST)
- Postal code: 25084
- Dialing code: 0365
- Website: Official website

Toscolano Maderno (Gardesano: Toscolà Madéren) is a town and comune on the West coast of Lake Garda, in the province of Brescia, in the region of Lombardy, northern Italy. It is located about 40 kilometres (25 mi) from Brescia.

Located on the Brescian shore of Lake Garda, it includes the two towns of Toscolano, an industrial center, and Maderno, a tourist resort, united into a single comune in 1928. The municipal territory includes the Monte Pizzocolo. For periods it was the capital of the Riviera di Salò confederation.

== Main sights ==
- Orto Botanico "G.E. Ghirardi", a research botanical garden
- Remains of a Roman villa at Toscolano, with some mosaic pavements
- Sanctuary of Supina (late 15th century)
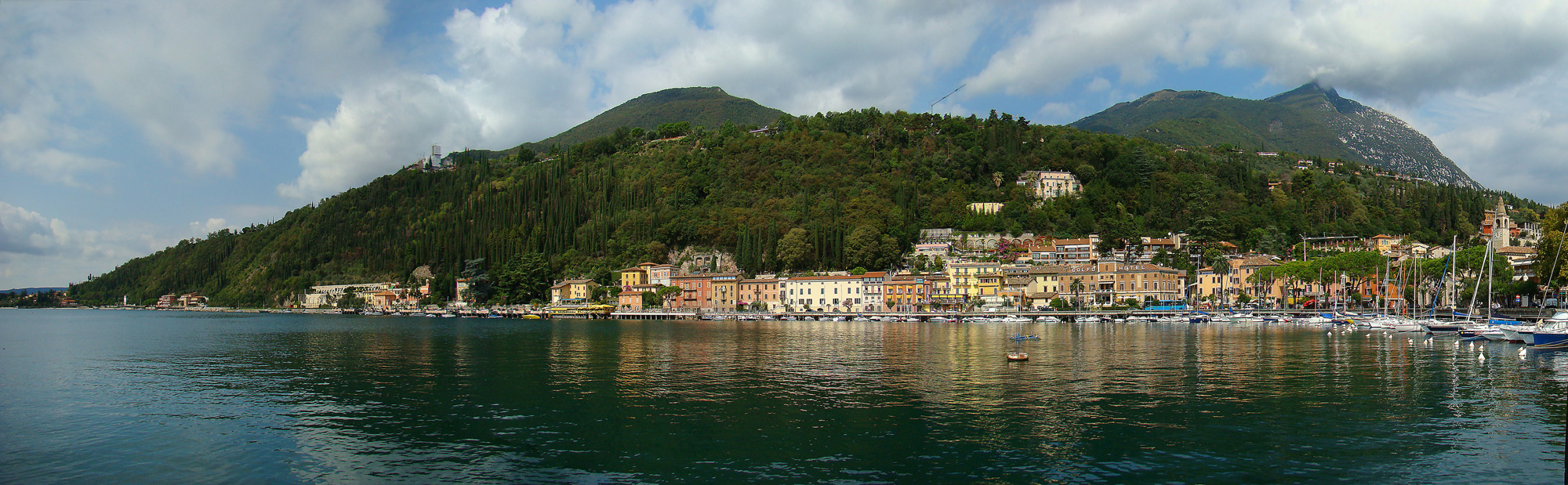
