= Capovalle =

Capovalle À (Lombard)
- Comune
- Comune di Capovalle
- Location within Italy Location within Lombardy
- Coordinates: 45°45′N 10°33′E
- Country: Italy
- Region: Lombardy
- Province: Brescia (BS)
- Frazioni: Gargnano, Idro, Treviso Bresciano, Valvestino, Vobarno, frazioni = Vico, Viè, Zumiè

Area
  - Total: 23 km^{2} (8.9 sq mi)
- Elevation: 1,000 m (3,300 ft)

Population (2011)
  - Total: 389
  - Density: 17/km^{2} (44/sq mi)
- Demonym: Capovallesi
- Time zone: UTC+1 (CET)
  - Summer (DST): UTC+2 (CEST)
- Postal code: 25070
- Dialing code: 0365
- ISTAT code: 017036
- Patron saint: St. Giovanni Battista
- Saint day: 7 April
- Website: Official website

Capovalle (before 1907 Hano; Brescian: À) is a town and comune in the Italian province of Brescia, in Lombardy in the upper Valle Sabbia.
