= Castelcovati =

Castelcovati Castelcuàt
- Comune
- Comune di Castelcovati
- Location within Italy Location within Lombardy
- Coordinates: 45°30′N 9°57′E
- Country: Italy
- Region: Lombardy
- Province: Province of Brescia (BS)

Area
  - Total: 6 km^{2} (2.3 sq mi)

Population (2011)
  - Total: 6,779
  - Density: 1,100/km^{2} (2,900/sq mi)
- Time zone: UTC+1 (CET)
  - Summer (DST): UTC+2 (CEST)
- Postal code: 25030
- Dialing code: 030
- Website: Official website

Castelcovati (Brescian: Castelcuàt) is a comune in the province of Brescia, in Lombardy.
