= Monte Pizzocolo =

Mountain in Italy

Coordinates: 45°40′23″N 10°35′28″E

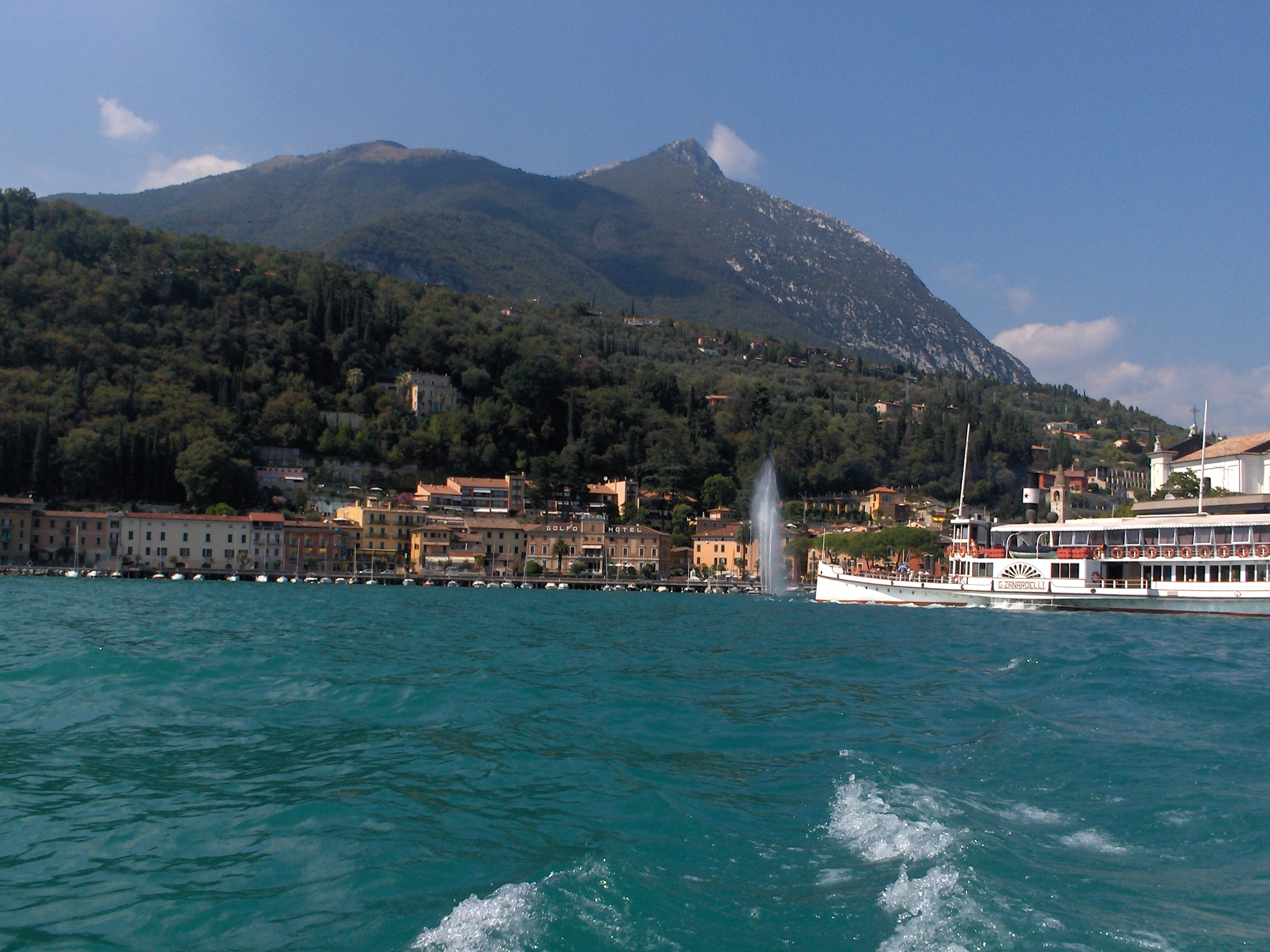

Highest point
- Elevation: 1,581 m (5,187 ft)

Geography
- Location: Lombardy, Italy
- Parent range: Brescia and Garda Prealps

Monte Pizzocolo is a mountain of Lombardy, Italy. It has an elevation of 1,581 metres.
