= Bosnasco =

- Comune
- Comune di Bosnasco
- Location within Italy Location within Lombardy
- Coordinates: 45°4′N 9°21′E
- Country: Italy
- Region: Lombardy
- Province: Province of Pavia (PV)

Area
  - Total: 4.8 km^{2} (1.9 sq mi)

Population (Dec. 2004)
  - Total: 616
  - Density: 130/km^{2} (330/sq mi)
- Time zone: UTC+1 (CET)
  - Summer (DST): UTC+2 (CEST)
- Postal code: 27049
- Dialing code: 0385

Bosnasco is a comune (municipality) in the Province of Pavia in the Italian region Lombardy, located about 45 km (28 mi) southeast of Milan and about 20 km (12 mi) southeast of Pavia. As of 31 December 2004, it had a population of 616 and an area of 4.8 km^{2} (1.9 sq mi).

Bosnasco borders the following municipalities: Arena Po, Castel San Giovanni, Montù Beccaria, San Damiano al Colle, Zenevredo.

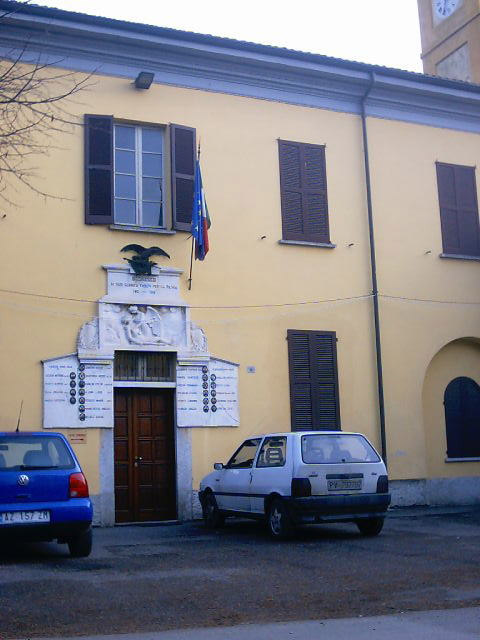
Bosnasco

== Demographic evolution ==
Historical population

Year	Pop.	±%
1861	755	—
1871	840	+11.3%
1881	882	+5.0%
1901	1,030	+16.8%
1911	1,021	−0.9%

Year	Pop.	±%
1921	1,013	−0.8%
1931	957	−5.5%
1936	951	−0.6%
1951	917	−3.6%
1961	801	−12.6%

Year	Pop.	±%
1971	661	−17.5%
1981	606	−8.3%
1991	596	−1.7%
2001	600	+0.7%

Source: Data from ISTAT
