= Rovescala =

- Comune
- Comune di Rovescala
- Coat of arms

- Location within Italy Location within Lombardy
- Coordinates: 45°1′N 9°21′E
- Country: Italy
- Region: Lombardy
- Province: Pavia (PV)
- Frazioni: Ca' Bella, Ca' del Vento, Ca' Littorina, Campana di Ferro, Ca' Nicelli, Ca' Nova, Cascina Molino, Cascina Val Madonna, Croce, Luzzano, Mosca, Pieve, Scazzolino

Government
  - Mayor: Corrado Del Forno

Area
  - Total: 8.3 km^{2} (3.2 sq mi)

Population (31 August 2007)
  - Total: 957
  - Density: 120/km^{2} (300/sq mi)
- Time zone: UTC+1 (CET)
  - Summer (DST): UTC+2 (CEST)
- Postal code: 27040
- Dialing code: 0385

Rovescala is a comune (municipality) in the Province of Pavia in the Italian region Lombardy, located about 50 km (31 mi) southeast of Milan and about 25 km (16 mi) southeast of Pavia, in the Oltrepò Pavese.
