= Bione =

- Comune
- Comune di Bione
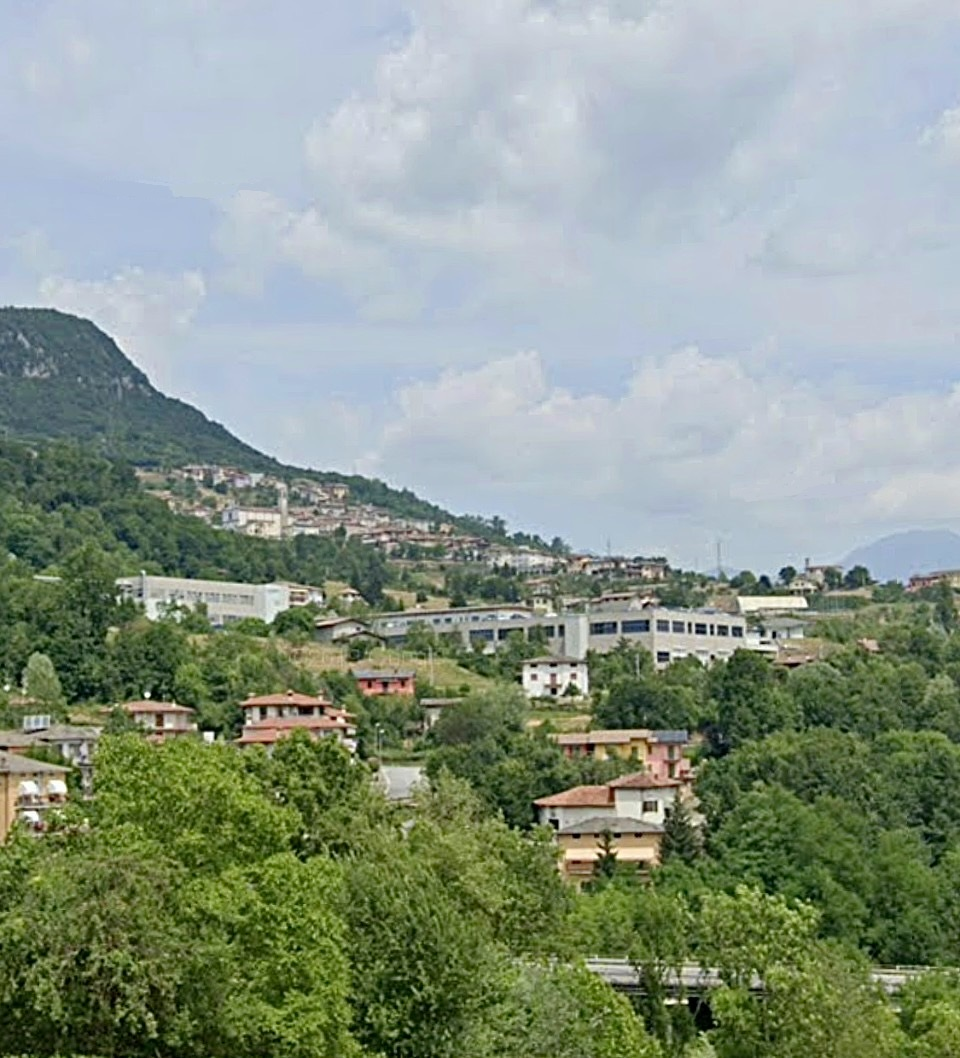
- View of Bione

- Location within Italy Location within Lombardy
- Coordinates: 45°40′N 10°20′E
- Country: Italy
- Region: Lombardy
- Province: Province of Brescia (BS)
- Frazioni: Pieve, S.Faustino

Area
  - Total: 17 km^{2} (6.6 sq mi)
- Elevation: 600 m (2,000 ft)

Population (2011)
  - Total: 1,483
  - Density: 87/km^{2} (230/sq mi)
- Demonym: Bionesi
- Time zone: UTC+1 (CET)
  - Summer (DST): UTC+2 (CEST)
- Postal code: 25070
- Dialing code: 0365
- Patron saint: Saint John
- Saint day: 27 December
- Website: Official website

Bione (Brescian: Biù) is a comune in the province of Brescia, Lombardy.
