= Idro, Lombardy =

Idro Ider
- Comune
- Comune di Idro
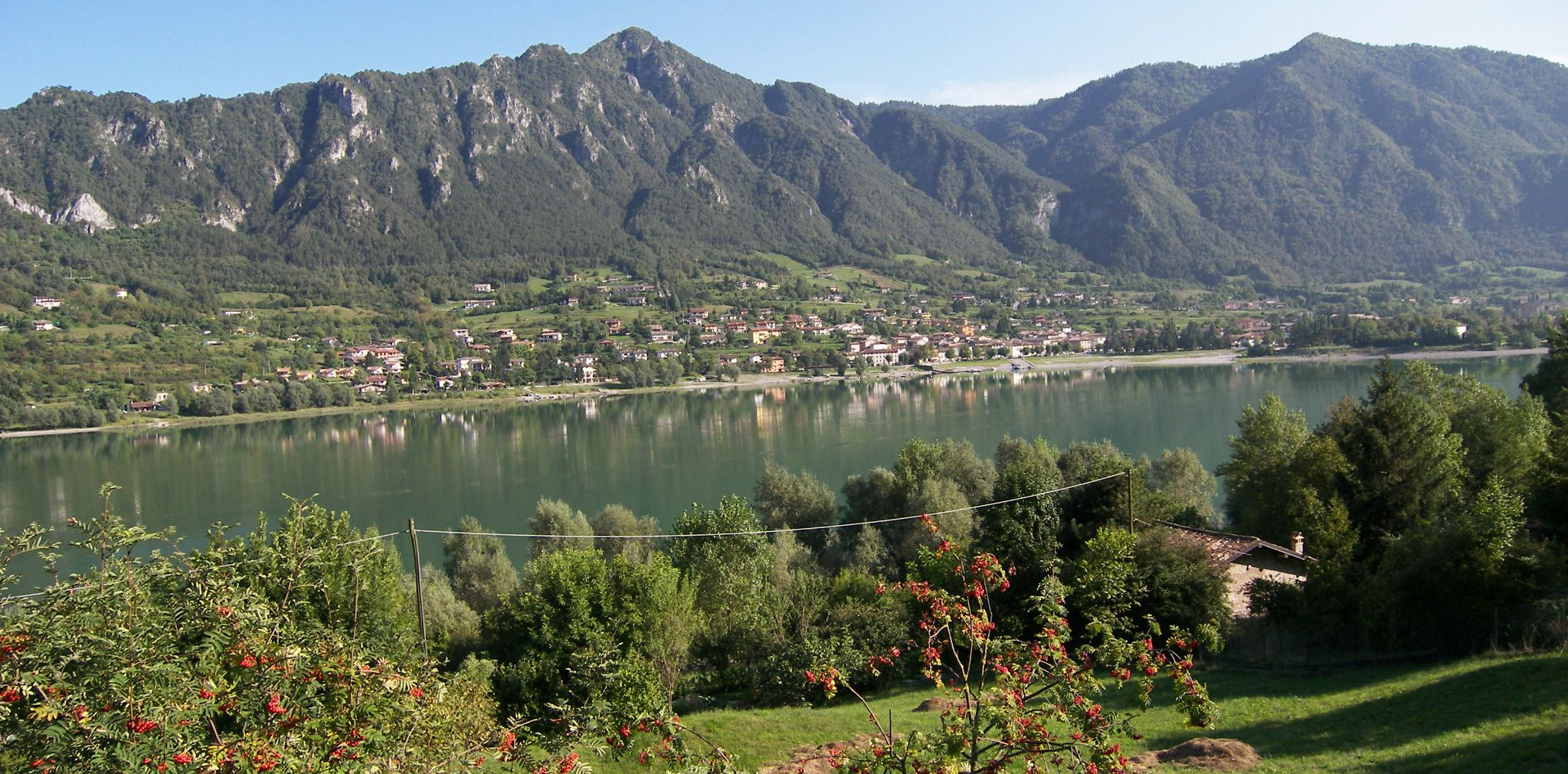

- Location within Italy Location within Lombardy
- Coordinates: 45°44′20″N 10°28′40″E
- Country: Italy
- Region: Lombardy
- Province: Brescia (BS)
- Frazioni: Crone, Lemprato, Pieve Vecchia, Tre Capitelli, Vantone, Vesta

Government
  - Mayor: Giuseppe Nabaffa

Area
  - Total: 22.88 km^{2} (8.83 sq mi)
- Elevation: 368 m (1,207 ft)

Population (30 November 2017)
  - Total: 1,937
  - Density: 84.66/km^{2} (219.3/sq mi)
- Demonym: Idrensi
- Time zone: UTC+1 (CET)
  - Summer (DST): UTC+2 (CEST)
- Postal code: 25074
- Dialing code: 0365
- Website: Official website

Idro (Brescian: Ider) is a town and comune in the province of Brescia, in Lombardy. It is situated near the southwestern end of Lake Idro, and at the northeastern end of the Valle Sabbia. Bordering communes are Anfo, Bagolino, Bondone, Capovalle, Lavenone, Treviso Bresciano and Valvestino.
