= Barghe =

- Comune
- Comune di Barghe
- Location within Italy Location within Lombardy
- Coordinates: 45°41′N 10°24′E
- Country: Italy
- Region: Lombardy
- Province: Brescia
- Frazioni: Fossane, Ponte Re, Vrange

Area
  - Total: 5.4 km^{2} (2.1 sq mi)
- Elevation: 295 m (968 ft)

Population (2011)
  - Total: 1,205
  - Density: 220/km^{2} (580/sq mi)
- Demonym: Barghesi
- Time zone: UTC+1 (CET)
  - Summer (DST): UTC+2 (CEST)
- Postal code: 25070
- Dialing code: 0365
- ISTAT code: 017012
- Website: Official website

Barghe is a comune in the province of Brescia, in Lombardy.
