= Odolo =

Odolo Odol
- Comune
- Comune di Odolo
- Location within Italy Location within Lombardy
- Coordinates: 45°39′N 10°23′E
- Country: Italy
- Region: Lombardy
- Province: Brescia (BS)
- Frazioni: Botteghe, Brete, Cadella, Cagnatico, Casa d'Odolo, Cereto, Cete, Colombaio, Forno, Gnavla, Pamparane, Vico

Area
  - Total: 6.5 km^{2} (2.5 sq mi)

Population (2011)
  - Total: 2,100
  - Density: 320/km^{2} (840/sq mi)
- Demonym: Odolesi
- Time zone: UTC+1 (CET)
  - Summer (DST): UTC+2 (CEST)
- Postal code: 25076
- Dialing code: 0365
- ISTAT code: 017121
- Patron saint: San Zeno
- Saint day: 12 April
- Website: Official website

Odolo (Brescian: Odol) is a town and comune in the province of Brescia, in Lombardy, Italy.

== Twin towns ==
Odolo is twinned with:

- Gonnosfanadiga, Italy, since 2008
