= Casto, Lombardy =

Casto Cast
- Comune
- Comune di Casto
- Location within Italy Location within Lombardy
- Coordinates: 45°42′N 10°19′E
- Country: Italy
- Region: Lombardy
- Province: Province of Brescia (BS)
- Frazioni: Alone, Auro, Briale, Comero, Famea, Malpaga

Area
  - Total: 21 km^{2} (8.1 sq mi)
- Elevation: 417 m (1,368 ft)

Population (2011)
  - Total: 1,894
  - Density: 90/km^{2} (230/sq mi)
- Demonym: Castesi
- Time zone: UTC+1 (CET)
  - Summer (DST): UTC+2 (CEST)
- Postal code: 25070
- Dialing code: 0365
- Patron saint: S.Antonio Abate
- Website: Official website

Casto (Brescian: Cast) is a comune in the province of Brescia, in Lombardy.
