= Vobarno =

Vobarno Boaren (Lombard)
- Comune
- Comune di Vobarno
- Location within Italy Location within Lombardy
- Coordinates: 45°39′N 10°30′E
- Country: Italy
- Region: Lombardy
- Province: Brescia (BS)
- Frazioni: Carpeneda, Carvanno, Collio, Degagna, Eno, Moglia, Pompegnino, Teglie

Area
  - Total: 53.20 km^{2} (20.54 sq mi)
- Elevation: 245 m (804 ft)

Population (2011)
  - Total: 8,288
  - Density: 155.8/km^{2} (403.5/sq mi)
- Demonym: Vobarnesi
- Time zone: UTC+1 (CET)
  - Summer (DST): UTC+2 (CEST)
- Postal code: 25079
- Dialing code: 0365
- ISTAT code: 017204
- Patron saint: Madonna della Rocca
- Saint day: Second Sunday in September and following Monday
- Website: Official website

Vobarno (Brescian: Boaren) is a town and comune of the Province of Brescia in the Italian region of Lombardy, at 246 metres (807 ft) above sea-level, with about 8,300 inhabitants (2011). It is situated on the river Chiese, 5 km north of Salò and Lake Garda.

== History ==
Although Neolithic remains have been found in the territory of the comune, nothing certain is known about the history of the area in prehistoric times nor in Antiquity, except for a single inscription, found near the town mentioning it as being at the confines of Italy.

Vobarno (known as Vobarna) in the Middle Ages was a fief of the bishops of Brescia, who at least twice sent representatives to enforce their suzerainty.

The 14th century and the beginning of the 15th saw Vobarno involved in the wars of the Scaliger, Visconti and Malatesta families, until, apparently moved by self-interest rather than force, they submitted of their own to Venice in 1426. Milan contested the new realities but was beaten in 1454, and thereafter Vobarna was a Venetian fief until 1797 when French troops under Napoleon conquered northern Italy and put an end to the independence of the doges. Vobarno, faithful to Venice, was put to flames and the sword. After the Napoleonic interlude, the town passed with Venice to the dominion of Austria, finally becoming part of united Italy by 1859.

== Twin towns ==
Vobarno is twinned with:

- Sümeg, Hungary, since 2008
