= Lavenone =

- Comune
- Comune di Lavenone
- Location within Italy Location within Lombardy
- Coordinates: 45°44′20″N 10°26′15″E
- Country: Italy
- Region: Lombardy
- Province: Brescia (BS)
- Frazioni: Bisenzio, Presegno

Area
  - Total: 31 km^{2} (12 sq mi)

Population (2011)
  - Total: 612
  - Density: 20/km^{2} (51/sq mi)
- Time zone: UTC+1 (CET)
  - Summer (DST): UTC+2 (CEST)
- Postal code: 25070
- Dialing code: 0365
- ISTAT code: 017087
- Website: Official website

Lavenone (Brescian: Lavinù) is a town and comune in the province of Brescia, in Lombardy, Italy. It is situated on the right bank of the river Chiese, a few km downstream from Lake Idro. The commune stretches into the mountains and includes the mountain village of Presegno.

== Notable people ==
Marta Roberti, artist and researcher
