= Sabbio Chiese =

- Comune
- Comune di Sabbio Chiese
- Coat of arms

- Location within Italy Location within Lombardy
- Coordinates: 45°39′N 10°26′E
- Country: Italy
- Region: Lombardy
- Province: Brescia (BS)
- Frazioni: Clibbio, Pavone, Sabbio Sopra

Government
  - Mayor: Rinaldo Bollani

Area
  - Total: 18 km^{2} (6.9 sq mi)
- Elevation: 277 m (909 ft)

Population (2011)
  - Total: 1,982
  - Density: 110/km^{2} (290/sq mi)
- Demonym: Sabbiensi
- Time zone: UTC+1 (CET)
  - Summer (DST): UTC+2 (CEST)
- Postal code: 25070
- Dialing code: 0365
- Website: Official website

Sabbio Chiese (Brescian: Sàbio) is a comune in the province of Brescia, in Lombardy. It is located on the river Chiese, roughly midway from the Lake Garda and the Lake Idro.

During the time of the Venetian Republic, Sabbio Chiese was one of the principal papermaking centres supplying the Venetian book trade. Printer Giovanni Antonio Nicolini da Sabbio and his family came from Sabbio Chiese.

== Main sights ==
- Rocca (Castle)
- The small church of St. Peter
