= Provaglio Val Sabbia =

- Comune
- Comune di Provaglio Val Sabbia
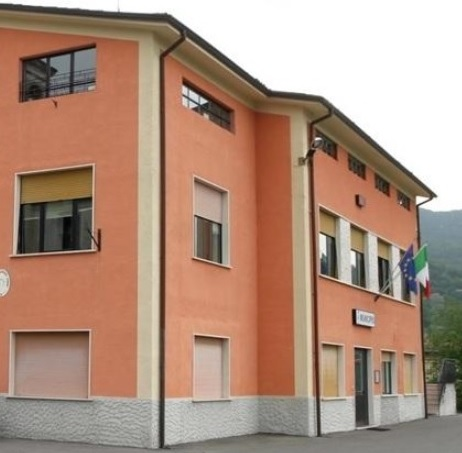
- Town hall

- Location within Italy Location within Lombardy
- Coordinates: 45°41′N 10°26′E
- Country: Italy
- Region: Lombardy
- Province: Brescia (BS)
- Frazioni: Arveaco, Barnico, Cesane, Livrio, Mastanico

Government
  - Mayor: Massimo Mattei

Area
  - Total: 14 km^{2} (5.4 sq mi)
- Elevation: 678 m (2,224 ft)

Population (30 November 2016)
  - Total: 912
  - Density: 65/km^{2} (170/sq mi)
- Demonym: Provagliesi
- Time zone: UTC+1 (CET)
  - Summer (DST): UTC+2 (CEST)
- Postal code: 25070
- Dialing code: 0365
- ISTAT code: 017157
- Website: Official website

Provaglio Val Sabbia (Brescian: Proai) is a comune in the province of Brescia, in Lombardy. It is located in the Valle Sabbia.
