= Concesio =

- Comune
- Comune di Concesio
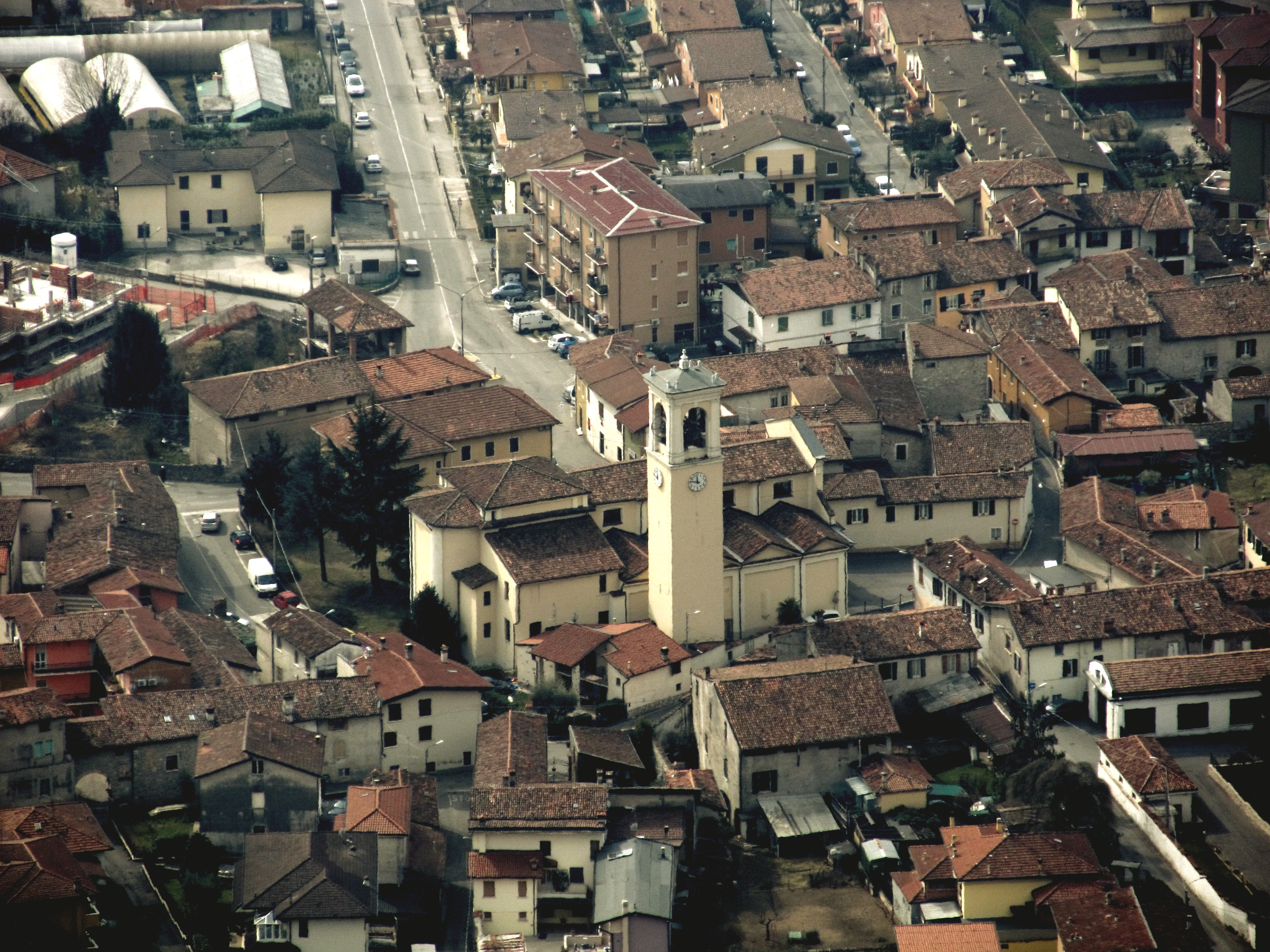
- Concesio

- Coat of arms

- Location within Lombardy Location within Italy
- Coordinates: 45°36′N 10°13′E
- Country: Italy
- Region: Lombardy
- Province: Brescia (BS)
- Frazioni: Artignago, Cà De Bosio, Campagnole, Costorio, Pieve, Roncaglie, Sant'Andrea, San Vigilio, Stocchetta

Government
  - Mayor: Stefano Retali (Democratic Party)

Area
  - Total: 19 km^{2} (7.3 sq mi)
- Elevation: 216 m (709 ft)

Population (2011)
  - Total: 15,087
  - Density: 790/km^{2} (2,100/sq mi)
- Demonym: Concesiani
- Time zone: UTC+1 (CET)
  - Summer (DST): UTC+2 (CEST)
- Postal code: 25062
- Dialing code: 030
- Patron saint: St. Roch; St. Paul VI
- Saint day: 16 August; 26 September

Concesio (Brescian: Consés; locally Conhè) is a town and comune in the province of Brescia, in Lombardy in Trompia valley. It is located 8.2 kilometres (5.1 mi) north of Brescia and 6.8 kilometres (4.2 mi) south of Sarezzo. Concesio is located in the lower Val Trompia, at the foot of Monte Spina. The comune is bounded by other communes of Brescia, Bovezzo, Lumezzane, Villa Carcina, Gussago and Collebeato.

It is the birthplace of Giovanni Battista Montini, who was Pope (1963–78) under the name of Paul VI.

== Notable people ==
- Giovanni Battista Montini (1897), became Pope Paul VI
- Mario Balotelli (1990), footballer
