= Marmentino =

Marmentino Marmintì
- Comune
- Comune di Marmentino
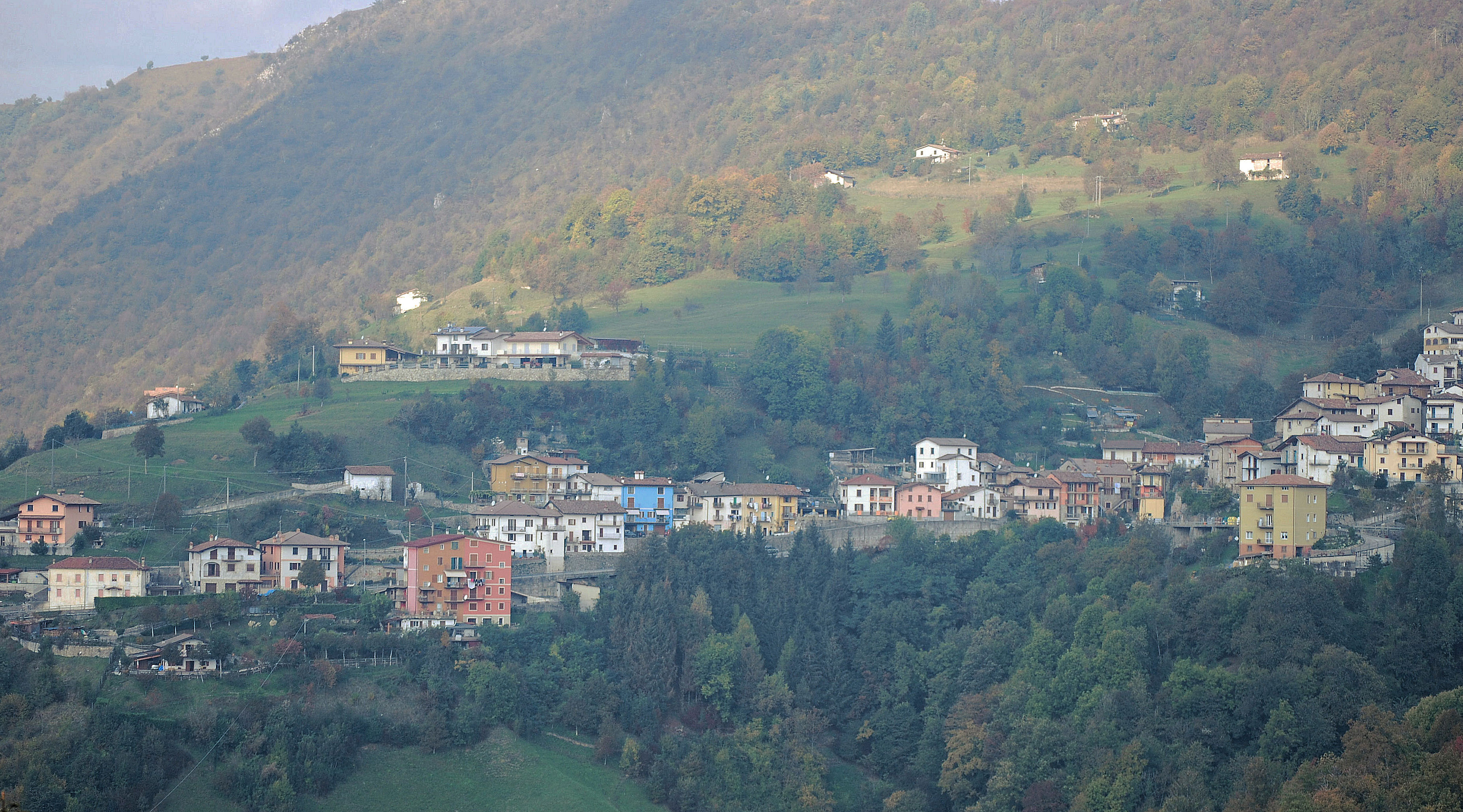

- Location within Italy Location within Lombardy
- Coordinates: 45°45′N 10°17′E
- Country: Italy
- Region: Lombardy
- Province: Brescia (BS)

Area
  - Total: 18 km^{2} (6.9 sq mi)

Population (2011)
  - Total: 689
  - Density: 38/km^{2} (99/sq mi)
- Time zone: UTC+1 (CET)
  - Summer (DST): UTC+2 (CEST)
- Postal code: 25060
- Dialing code: 030
- ISTAT code: 017105
- Website: Official website

Marmentino (Brescian: Marmintì) is a town and comune in the province of Brescia, in Lombardy. Neighbouring communes are Bovegno, Collio, Irma, Lodrino, Pertica Alta, Pertica Bassa, Pezzaze and Tavernole sul Mella. It is located in the Trompia valley area.
