= Marcheno =

Marcheno Marché
- Comune
- Comune di Marcheno
- Location within Italy Location within Lombardy
- Coordinates: 45°42′N 10°13′E
- Country: Italy
- Region: Lombardy
- Province: Brescia (BS)
- Frazioni: Aleno, Brozzo, Cesovo, Madonnina, Parte

Area
  - Total: 22 km^{2} (8.5 sq mi)

Population (2011)
  - Total: 4,440
  - Density: 200/km^{2} (520/sq mi)
- Demonym: Marchenesi
- Time zone: UTC+1 (CET)
  - Summer (DST): UTC+2 (CEST)
- Postal code: 25060
- Dialing code: 030
- ISTAT code: 017104
- Website: Official website

Marcheno (Brescian: Marché) is a town and comune in the province of Brescia, in Lombardy. Neighbouring communes are Casto, Gardone Val Trompia, Lodrino, Lumezzane, Marone, Sarezzo, Tavernole sul Mella, and Zone. It is located in the Trompia valley.
