= Arcangelo Tadini =

Italian Roman Catholic saint (1846–1912)

Saint Arcangelo Tadini

Priest
- Born: 12 December 1846; Verolanuova, Brescia, Kingdom of Lombardy–Venetia
- Died: 20 May 1912 (aged 65); Botticino Sera, Brescia, Kingdom of Italy
- Venerated in: Roman Catholic Church
- Beatified: 3 October 1999, Saint Peter's Square, Vatican City by Pope John Paul II
- Canonized: 26 April 2009, Saint Peter's Square, Vatican City by Pope Benedict XVI
- Major shrine: Minor Basilica of Santa Maria Assunta, Botticino Sera, Brescia, Italy
- Feast: 20 May
- Attributes: Book of Hours; Priest's cassock
- Patronage: Worker Sisters of the Holy House of Nazareth

Arcangelo Tadini (12 October 1846 – 20 May 1912) was an Italian Roman Catholic priest. Tadini was ordained as a priest in 1870 and went on to found a religious congregation dedicated to the poor and ill while taking advantage of the Industrial Revolution to support women in work and education. Tadini was disabled due to a lame leg he had after suffering an accident while he studied for the priesthood. He initiated various parish initiatives and a relief fund for the aged and the ill.

Tadini's beatification process launched in 1960 and he became titled as a Servant of God while the confirmation of his heroic virtue in 1998 enabled for him to be titled as Venerable; he was beatified on 3 October 1999 and was later canonized on 26 April 2009.

== Life ==
Arcangelo Tadini was born on 12 October 1846 in Verolanuova in Brescia as the last of four children born to the nobles Pietro Tadini and Antonia Gadola. His father had previous children with his previous wife Giulia Gadola (Antonia's sister) until her death thus making Tadini the eleventh child his father sired. His father had seven children with his first wife and after her death tried to manage his children from 1829 with his sister-in-law's aid whom he married on 10 July 1838. Tadini was baptized in the San Lorenzo Martire church in his hometown on 18 October 1846 with his godparents being Giambattista Scolari and Caterina Gadola.

Tadini's father Pietro was born in Brescia on 15 February 1790 and married his first wife Giulia Gadola on 6 July 1819 and who was born on 28 September 1801. Tadini's own mother Antonia (born in 1806) was 32 upon her marriage to Pietro and in 1848 she became a volunteer nurse. His father Pietro died on 1 January 1860 and his mother died on 23 December 1880.

He suffered from a grave illness that almost killed him when he was two but he rallied and survived. He attended school in his hometown until he was ten and in 1855 attended another school where his brothers Alessandro and Giulio attended. His two brothers studied for the priesthood but Giulio became a priest while Alessandro did not due to being expelled due to his political beliefs. Tadini's vocation to the priesthood grew over time but became more concrete when he attended his brother Giulio's first Mass and subsequent exposure to his activities as a priest. Giulio would later die in 1909.

Tadini commenced his theological and philosophical studies for the priesthood in Brescia in 1864. He suffered an accident during his studies that left him having a lifelong limp due to the inadequacies of treatment for the accident that saw his knee broken. Tadini received ordination to the priesthood on 19 June 1870 from the Prince-Bishop of Trento Benedetto Riccabona de Reichelfels since the current Bishop of Brescia Girolamo Verzieri was in Rome for the First Vatican Council. Tadini celebrated his first Mass as a priest on 26 June 1870 in his hometown. He was looking forward to his duties as a priest but a serious illness forced him to reside with his relatives from 1870 to 1871 as he recovered. Upon that he was made the curate for Lodrino in Val Trompia (and a schoolteacher for children) and he held that position from 29 June 1871 until 27 May 1873 when he was made the curate for the Santa Maria della Noce shrine near Brescia. It was there that he was noted for his attentiveness to the material and spiritual needs of his parishioners and his care of refugees. It was also there that he organized a soup kitchen that would serve hundreds after intense flooding caused a great deal of people to become homeless. In 1885 he was appointed as the curate for Botticino Sera (arriving there that 29 November) to aid the ailing parish priest Giacomo Coresti and then became its parish priest in 1887 following Cortesi's death on 26 November 1886; he was undergoing treatment for his leg in Albano when he received this news on 20 July 1887. He held that position for the remainder of his life and there organized catechesis lessons for various age groups.

He revitalized parish initiatives that all had a pastoral focus at their heart and he founded what became known as the Workers' Mutual Aid Association in 1893 which was a form of social insurance for the ill and injured as well as the aged. He also used his inheritance to build a spinning mill in 1898 that hired women and used the profits to establish a residence for them. Tadini also founded his own religious congregation in 1900 consisted of women and their role was to help the women in factories and also to provide them with an education. This proved a bit scandalous for the time since factories were considered to be immoral and dangerous places. In his parish he allowed the Third Order of Saint Francis to settle there and he also praised Pope Leo XIII for having issued Rerum Novarum. His Jesuit friend and priest Maffeo Franzini helped him revive the Secular Ursulines in his parish and so Franzini sent from Milan the former Canossian religious Leopoldina Paris to aid him in this. But this was short lived as Paris did not share Tadini's vision and so left him.

Later in life he was forced to use a cane due to the limp he suffered which became worse over time due to his advancing age; he was later forced to use a wheelchair and was wheeled to a 21 March 1912 Mass that commemorated his entrance as a parish priest for that church. He alluded during the Mass that "I will not live much longer" as his failing health was getting worse over time on a gradual level. He was celebrating Mass on 8 May 1912 when he was taken ill after being struck with an illness and on 9 May received both the Anointing of the Sick and the Viaticum from his confessor. Tadini died in his bed on 20 May at 5:00am; his funeral as celebrated the following morning. His remains were exhumed on 11 March 1943 and again on 24 May 1999; the remains were exhumed for the final time on 29 October 2009 just after he was canonized and moved to the parish of Santa Maria Assunta in Botticino Sera now made a minor basilica. His order now operates in countries across the world such as Burundi and the United Kingdom. He had died without his order having received full approval; the Bishop of Brescia Giacinto Gaggia issued diocesan approval on 30 November 1931 while Pope Pius XII issued the decree of praise on 12 January 1953. Pope John XXIII issued papal approval a decade later on 16 March 1962.

== Sainthood ==
=== Initial process and Venerable ===
The informative process opened in the Diocese of Brescia on 13 January 1960 - in which he was given the title of Servant of God under Pope John XXIII - and had been assigned to collecting all documentation available on Tadini. Such documents would be designed to attest to his cause for sainthood. It concluded its work on 19 June 1964. Theologians gathered all his writings in order to ascertain whether or not such texts were in line with the faith and voiced their assent to his publications in a decree issued on 5 March 1970.

The Congregation for the Causes of Saints validated the informative process on 27 October 1989 and opened the so-called "Roman Phase" in which the C.C.S. would begin their own investigation into Tadini's potential saintliness. The postulation sent the Positio to the C.C.S. for further assessments which led to theologians approving its contents on 16 June 1998. The C.C.S. followed suit on 17 November 1998.

On 21 December 1998 he was declared to be Venerable after Pope John Paul II confirmed that he had lived a model life of heroic virtue - both cardinal and theological virtues.

=== Beatification ===
The miracle needed for his beatification was reported to the postulation and investigated in a diocesan process that opened in April 1996 and closed one month later. It was validated on 25 October 1996 and sent to a medical board that approved the healing to be a miracle on 17 December 1998. Theologians also voiced their approval on 23 March 1999 while the C.C.S. also approved it on 18 May 1999. The pope himself provided the final approval on 28 June 1999.

On 3 October 1999 the pontiff presided over Tadini's beatification.

The miracle that led to his beatification was the healing of the nun Carmela Berardi who was a member of Tadini's order. Berardi suffered from tuberculosis that blocked her vocal cords leaving her unable to speak from 1936 until her healing in 1943. Tadini's remains were being exhumed on 11 March 1943 so the order's Superior General asked her to ask for Tadini's intercession. Berardi did this and found that she could speak to the surprise of those present; the damage that the tuberculosis caused also disappeared.

=== Canonization ===
The miracle required for his sanctification took place in the Diocese of Brescia and as such was investigated there as soon as the diocesan process opened on 16 June 2006. It concluded one month later and was validated on 24 November 2006. The medical board approved it on 15 November 2007 and theologians did likewise on 22 April 2008. The C.C.S. also approved it on 28 October 2008 while Pope Benedict XVI voiced his approval on 6 December 2008.

Tadini was proclaimed as a saint of the Roman Catholic Church on 26 April 2009. In that Mass the pope said: "How prophetic was Don Tadini's charismatic intuition, and how current his example is today, in this time of grave economic crisis!" in reference to the 2008 financial crisis.

The miracle that led to his canonization was the healing of the couple Roberto Marazzi and Elisabetta Fostini who were sterile and unable to conceive despite several attempts from 2000 to 2004. Doctors suggested IVF treatment to them but the couple refused while later coming into touch with families who met in Tadini's order's motherhouse for their Gruppo Famiglia Beato Tadini meetings held each month. The couple attended since April 2004 and bore their first child Maria on 5 August 2005 and a second in Giovanni on 3 December 2006.
