= Villa Carcina =

Villa Carcina Vila Carsìna (Lombard)
- Comune
- Comune di Villa Carcina
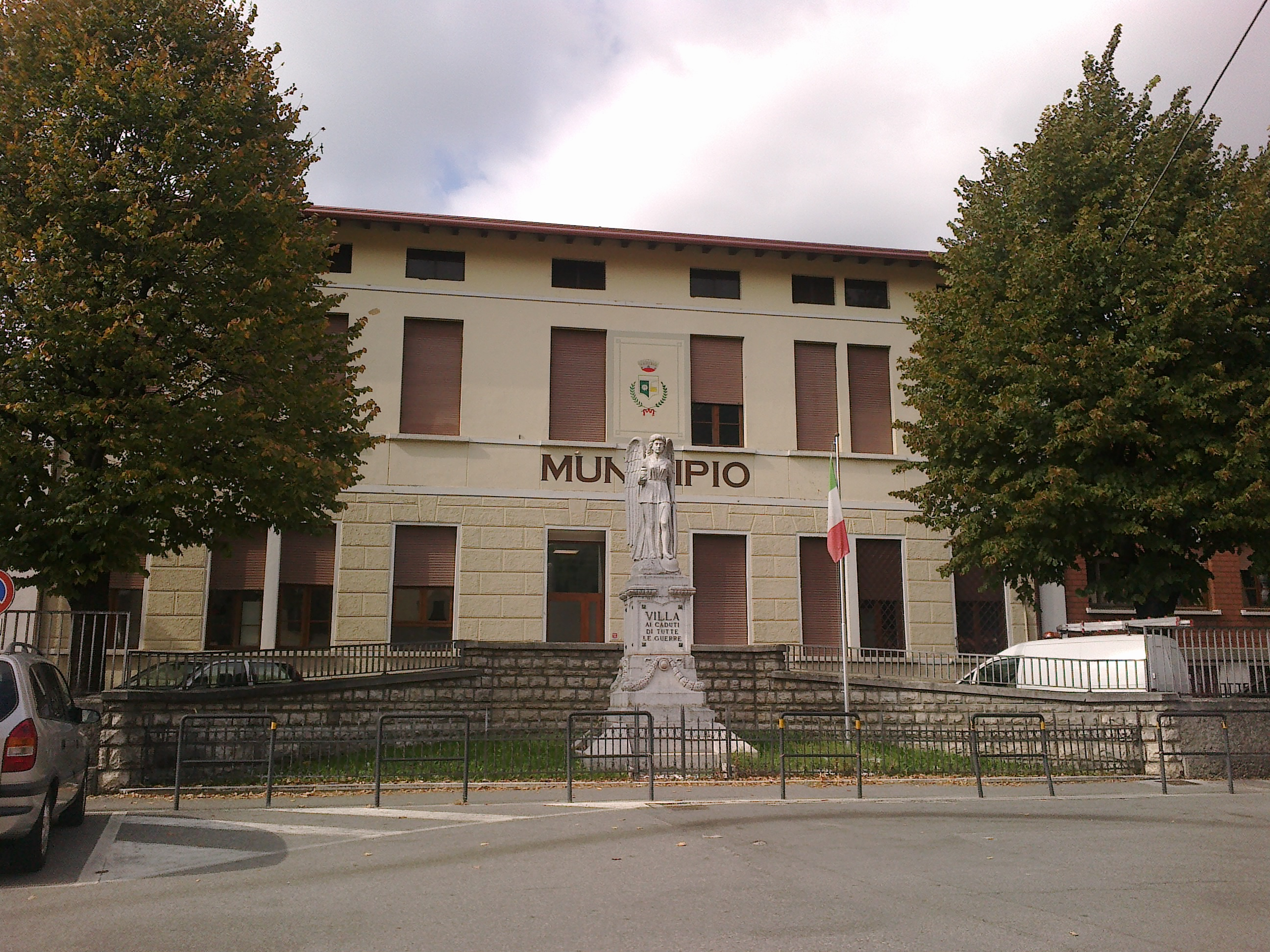
- Town hall

- Location within Italy Location within Lombardy
- Coordinates: 45°38′N 10°12′E
- Country: Italy
- Region: Lombardy
- Province: Brescia (BS)
- Frazioni: Cailina, Carcina, Cogozzo, Pregno, Villa

Area
  - Total: 14.41 km^{2} (5.56 sq mi)
- Elevation: 214 m (702 ft)

Population (2011)
  - Total: 11,082
  - Density: 769.0/km^{2} (1,992/sq mi)
- Demonym: Villa Carcinesi
- Time zone: UTC+1 (CET)
  - Summer (DST): UTC+2 (CEST)
- Postal code: 25069
- Dialing code: 030
- ISTAT code: 017199
- Patron saint: Sant'Antonio - (Cogozzo), San Michele Arcangelo - (Cailina), Sant'Antonio da Padova - (Pregno), Sant'Emiliano e Tirso - (Villa), San Giacomo Maggiore - (Carcina)
- Website: Official website

Villa Carcina (Brescian: Vila Carsìna; locally Vila Carhìna) is a comune in the province of Brescia, in Lombardy. Neighbouring communes are Concesio and Sarezzo. Situated on the river Mella, it is part of the Trompia valley.
