= Luigi Nocivelli =

Italian entrepreneur and business executive

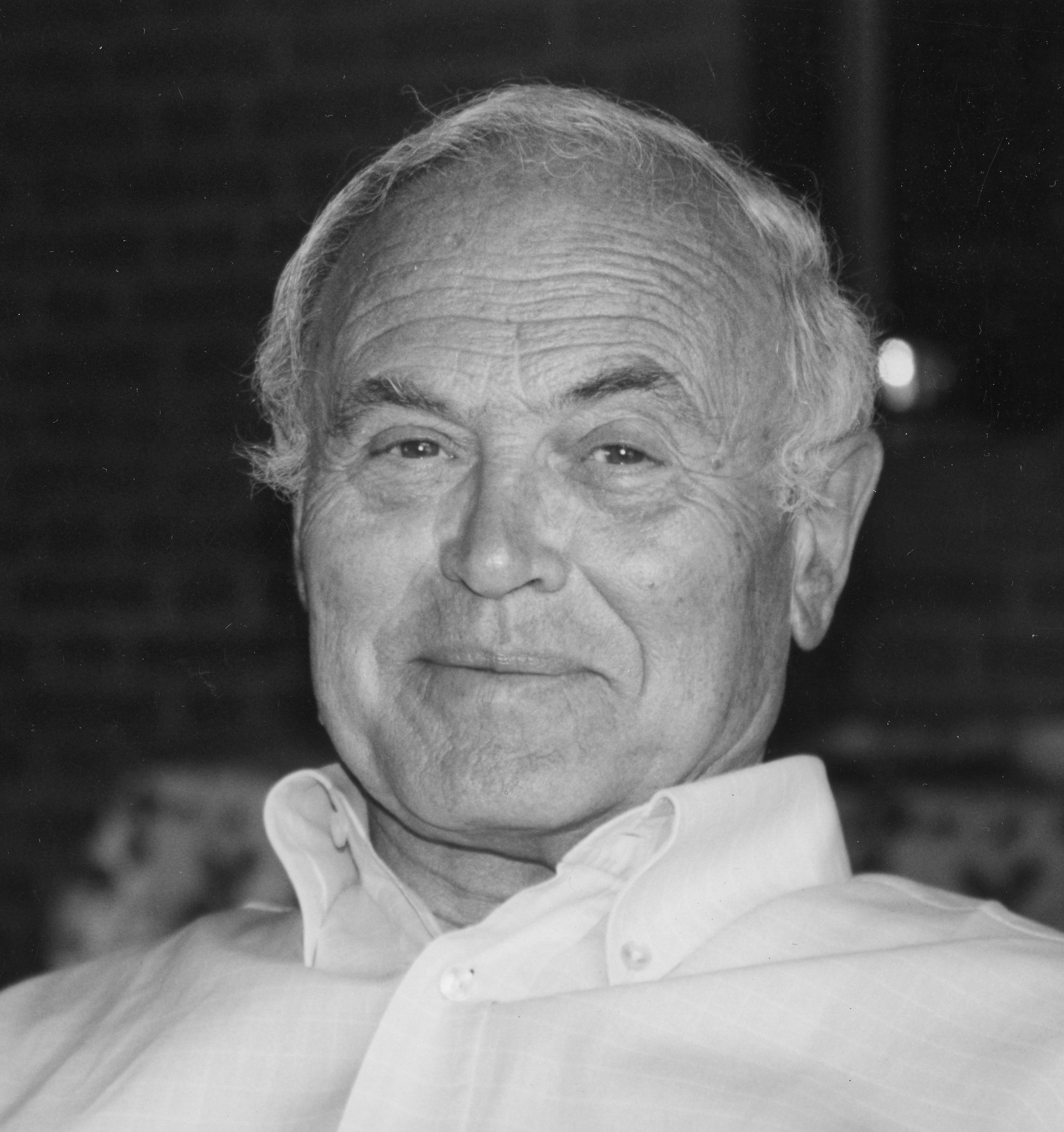
Luigi Nocivelli

Luigi Nocivelli (Offlaga, 29 April 1930 – Verolanuova, 19 December 2006) was an Italian entrepreneur and business executive. Between 1988 and 2002, he was a board member of Banca Lombarda.

== Early years ==
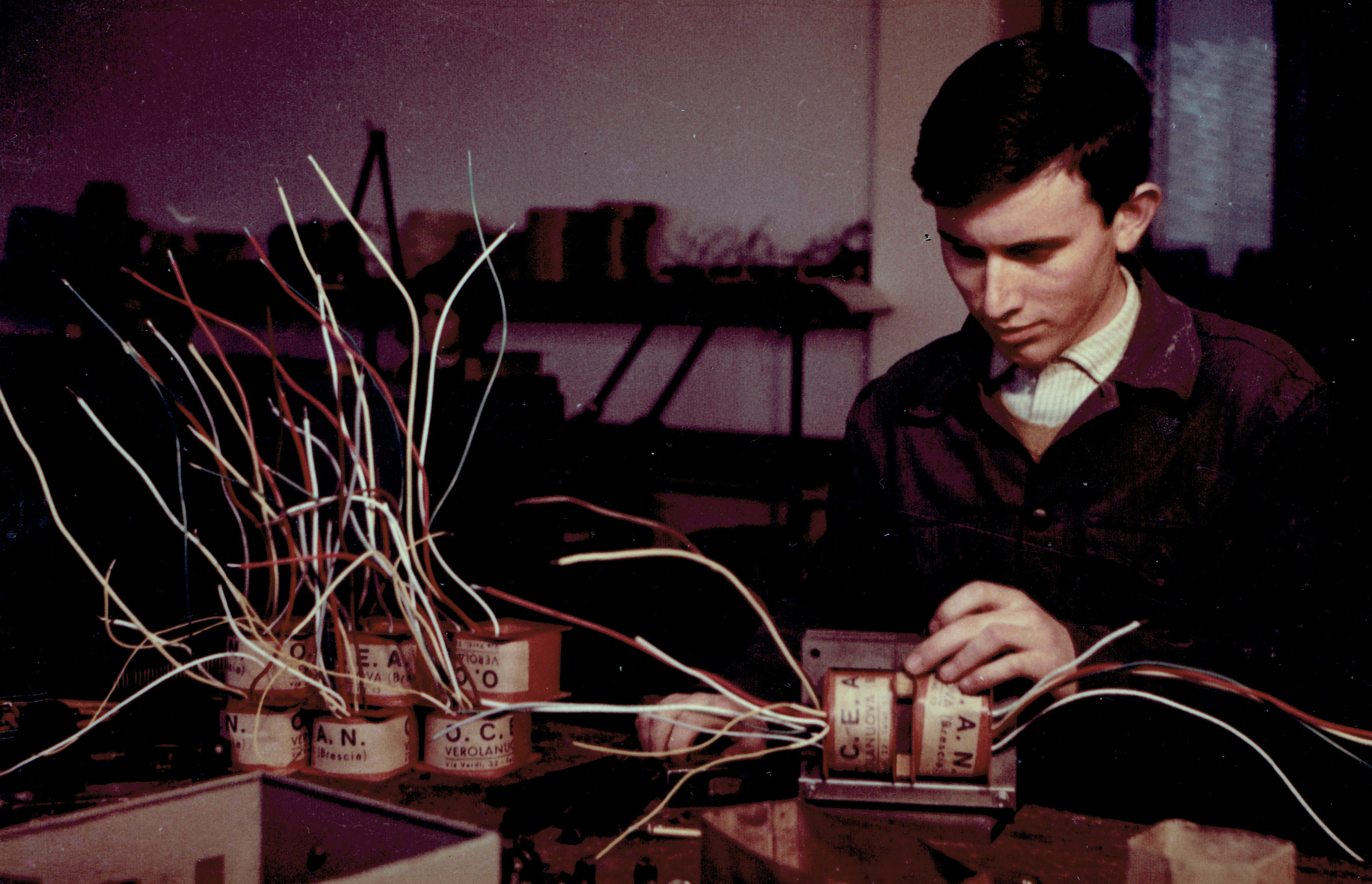
Blue-collar worker with an Ocean voltage regulator

Nocivelli was born in Offlaga in the province of Brescia and was the first son of Angelo and Lina Nocivelli. In 1947, a few days before Nocivelli was due to sit for his final exams for a diploma as an electrical engineering technician, his father was seriously injured falling off a train while traveling to Milan.

During his father's recovery, Nocivelli kept the family's small electro-mechanical workshop in business. At the start of 1950, Angelo Nocivelli had made a suitable recovery and he returned to work alongside his son. Nocivelli decided to continue his studies and enrolled in the Economics faculty at Bocconi University in Milan. He had an important insight when reading an article about voltage regulators which Siemens had studied but never produced industrially. This component would improve how televisions worked and a voltage regulator would be required in every television sold. It was a potentially vast market. The Nocivelli workshop in Verolanuova (BS) began to grow as production increased rapidly and the business expanded. In 1956 he was enlisted, but during time in the barracks he continued to think about the development of the family workshop. His aim was to transform it into a real electromechanical factory and a short while after he was discharged, at the end of 1957, OCEAN of Verolanuova was founded, the Officina Costruzioni Electriche Angelo Nocivelli (Angelo Nocivelli Electrical Constructions Workshop).

=== The management of Ocean ===
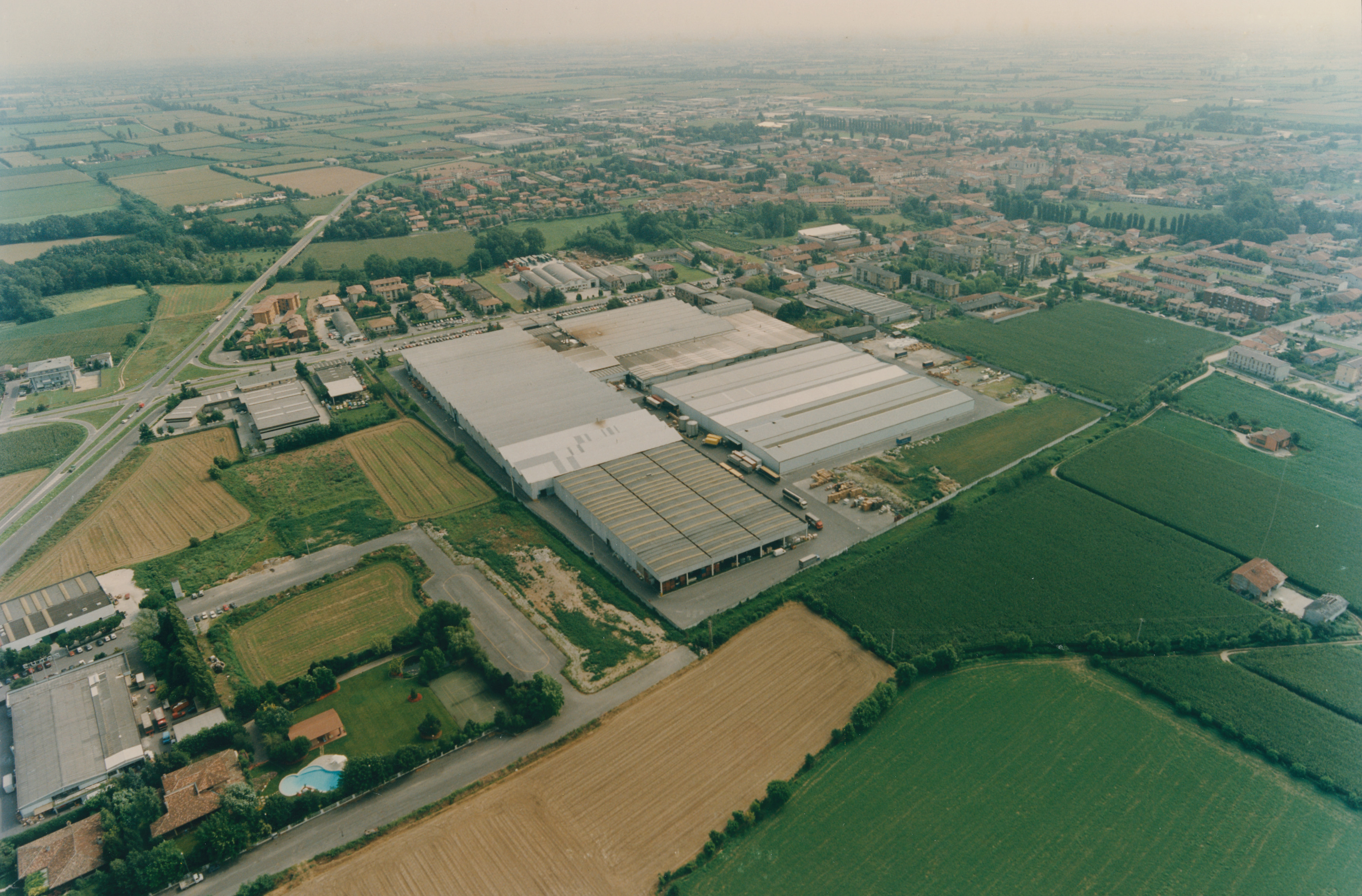
Ocean plant in Verolanuova, Viale Europa

In 1958, Ocean was a robust company. Angelo's other children were alongside their father and brother at the helm of the company: Bruna was responsible for administration whilst Gianfranco specialized in commercial relations and would go on to follow Luigi in all subsequent industrial ventures. However, in the second half of the year there was a sudden collapse in the market for voltage regulators, so Nocivelli decided to explore the sector of refrigerators, which was at that time a new, rapidly growing market. In 1959 the first experimental phase began, with the aim of commencing manufacturing the following year in Ocean's factory, so the plant capacity was expanded to meet orders of more than 5,000 units.

In 1960 Nocivelli married Barbara Zarnetti and in 1964, he moved with his wife and two children to live above the new Ocean factory which by then covered an area of 10,000 m^{2}. During this period the Company experienced significant expansion and began to serve foreign markets. Ocean became one of the leading European producers of freezers on behalf of third parties, with annual production levels of 250,000 units.

In 1969 the Nocivelli family acquired a factory in Pozzaglio to produce vertical freezers for domestic use, operating in conjunction with the viale Europa plant in Verolanuova.

=== The Italian electro-mechanical dream ===
At the start of the 70s, as he was overseeing the expansion of Ocean, Nocivelli was also cultivating his dream of re-launching Italian electro-mechanics at an international level. He started to buy shares in Ercole Marelli with the aim of mounting a takeover of the company that could best represent Italy's potential in this sector. He joined the board of directors in 1973 and, after becoming majority shareholder, took control of the company, leaving his brother Gianfranco at the helm of Ocean.

He embarked on a restructuring plan to restore Marelli's pride and competitiveness, embodying an entrepreneurial style characterized by dedication, know-how and pragmatism.

He wanted to create a system that would combine machines for producing energy and machines for transforming this energy into electricity that could be transported to consumers. He expanded the range of products and implemented the system capabilities. The company entered the market of electrical power lines and increasingly focused its attention abroad in order to identify new markets and opportunities for major contracts. The company also focused on nuclear energy, which was considered essential for the growth of the country.

Under Nocivelli's stewardship, Ercole Marelli significantly strengthened its position, with a turnover of almost 80 billion lire in 1974 - an increase of 56% compared to 1973. However, Nocivelli's dream was made more challenging by an extremely complex global situation marked by oil crises, the blocking of the energy plan, inflation, monetary chaos, unemployment and salary reductions, while armed insurrection and terrorism brought the country close to the brink. Marelli was forced into liquidation and Nocivelli stepped down from the management of the electro-mechanical group in 1981.

=== The electrical appliance empire ===
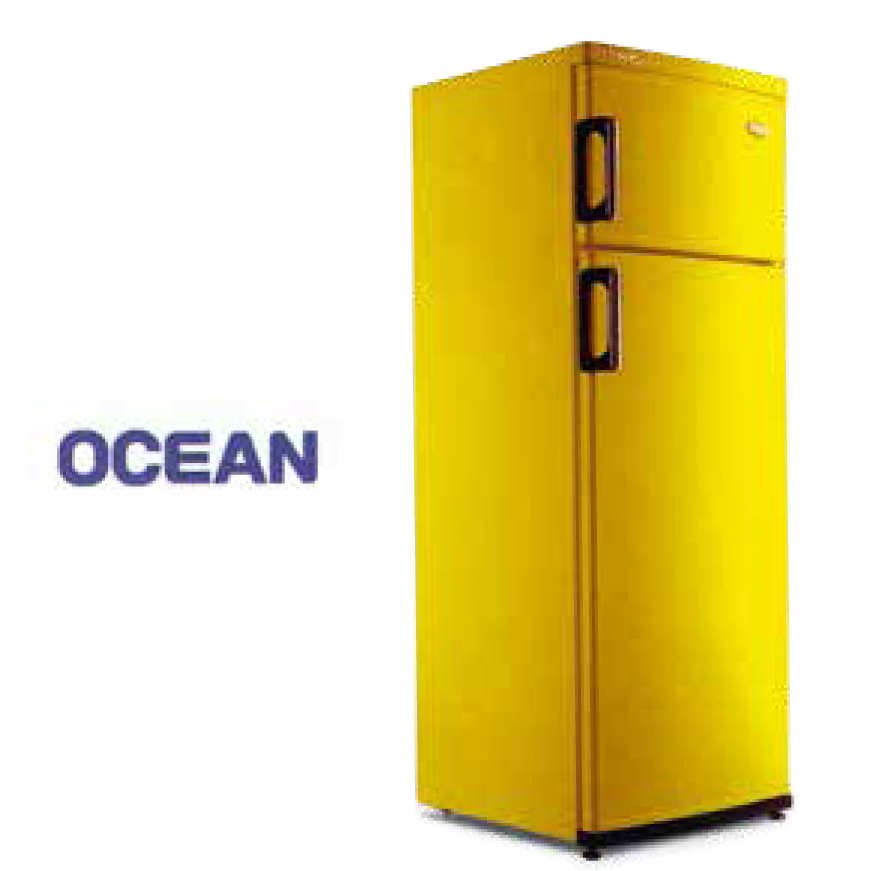
Ocean refrigerator, Sfera line ('80s)

Nocivelli returned to Verolanuova to work full-time on the industrial development of El.Fi Elettrofinanziaria, the company that the Nocivelli Family had created to manage their group's finances and future acquisitions. His idea was to evolve mainly through external growth, with the aim of transforming the family-run business into a leading international player in the electrical appliances sector. Since the early 80s, there was a continual stream of acquisitions. This is a summary of the main M&A operations:

- 1984: Zanussi Climatizzazione of Bassano Del Grappa (VI), subsequently Ocean Idroclima, which saw the group first enter the sector of household appliances
- 1984: Sangiorgio of La Spezia, that operated in the washing machines market
- 1985: Samet of Romano d'Ezzelino (VI), that deals with the cookers and ovens segment
- 1987: Costan of Belluno, the commercial refrigeration leader in Italy with branches all throughout Europe. The business was not directly present in the household sector, but it was in a similar business sector and this was seen by Luigi and Gianfranco as a new and interesting opportunity.
- 1988: Bonnet Réfrigération and Froid Satam Brandt, later Bonnet Névé (France), that were acquired from the Thompson group and were in the commercial refrigeration sector
- 1988: Filiberti Argo, a factory producing complementary products to those produced by Ocean Idroclima like boilers, cast iron radiators and small household air-conditioners
- 1989: Chaffoteaux et Maury (France), producers of wall-mounted boilers, electric and gas hot water heaters
- 1989: Ofta, later Domoservice (France), specialised in the maintenance of heating systems
- 1991: Filiberti Argo became Sanyo Argo Clima following a joint-venture with the Japanese companies Sanyo and Sumitomo
- 1992: Blomberg GmbH (Germany) manufacturers of high-end washing machines and Elektra Bregenz (Austria), also owned by the Blomberg family, which manufactured ovens, kitchens and cooking hobs
- 1999: Thomson-Brandt (France), out-and-out market leader in the sector of large electrical appliances who acquired in 1999 Polar, a Polish company within the same sector
- 1999: in the same year it also acquired the English company George Barker that operated in the commercial refrigeration sector.

Every operation represented a stage in a process of growth that stems from a very specific philosophy on life. Luigi Nocivelli was striving to create a large homogeneous, harmonious and balanced system: from freezers to refrigerators and from there on to all other segments of the electrical appliance sector, to enter families’ homes and help solve practical everyday issues. Nocivelli and his brother Gianfranco transformed the small family-run business into one of the main European industrial players in the electrical appliances sector. By the end of 1993 El.Fi. controlled an important leading group in the white goods sector that was also active in industrial refrigeration, heating & air-conditioning market, with a total turnover of almost 3500 billion lire and 14,000 employees.

=== The final project ===
There was a variation in the strategic objectives of the Nocivelli brothers: they decided to focus the business in the electrical appliances and commercial refrigeration sectors, thus completely abandoning heating and air-conditioning.

Nocivelli pursued a design which he had had in mind since his time with Marelli, which involved creating a consistent and integrated system of multinationals that would interact with each other, while complementing one another by diversifying risks and maximizing profits. The acquisitions during the previous twenty years aimed to establish a European electrical appliances company in order to reach the homes of the greatest possible number of consumers and be present simultaneously with refrigeration, cooking and washing appliances. The only piece missing from the project was that of small electrical appliances.

Moulinex could have been that very piece, but despite being a very large and well-known company, it was experiencing financial difficulties and was protected by the State and large banks so it was not very transparent and difficult to value. Luigi Nocivelli decided to acquire a small stake to start testing the waters. In this same period he had a health scare as a tumor in his intestine required surgical removal.

In 2000 the takeover attempt of the French group continued. The aim was valuing Moulinex and Brandt, aligning the two companies and proceeding with a merger. Nocivelli requested a detailed due diligence, but when the French opposed this, he abandoned the idea of investigating further and signed the preliminary letter of intent for the merger. Once the agreement was completed at the end of the year, he presented a three-year restructuring plan with the aim of achieving a turnover of 6,000 billion. The plan involved cutting the workforce by approximately 2,000 employees and confirmed that all production plants would be kept, although they required investment and modernization.

Nocivelli decided to leave the companies’ management in French hands and restricted his role to that of majority shareholder allowing the board to work with the banks. In April 1500 employees were made redundant and three factories were shut down. In subsequent months, the management closed down other sites and laid-off more staff. The situation plummeted when the French banks closed the lines of credit and in September 2001 CEO Patrick Puy was summoned to present the company's accounts in court.

Nocivelli put all his efforts into getting his life back on track. He concentrated on the lawsuit in the French courts and got back to work. He wanted to spring back quickly with a new entrepreneurial venture and restore his honesty and value as an individual first and foremost even before his standing as an industrialist. The trial continued and in 2004, Pierre Blayau, the CEO of Moulinex before the merger with Brandt, was accused of embezzlement, bankruptcy and false accounting. Even Puy, the CEO of Moulinex-Brandt was found guilty along with five other top managers for similar crimes. Luigi and Gianfranco were questioned about a deficit in Brandt's funds, but they had no difficulty in stating that these funds had been used for the realignment of the two companies before the merger. This was an important victory for the Nocivelli family, that was completely absolved of any wrongdoing at the end of the trial on 12 February 2015.

=== The rebirth ===
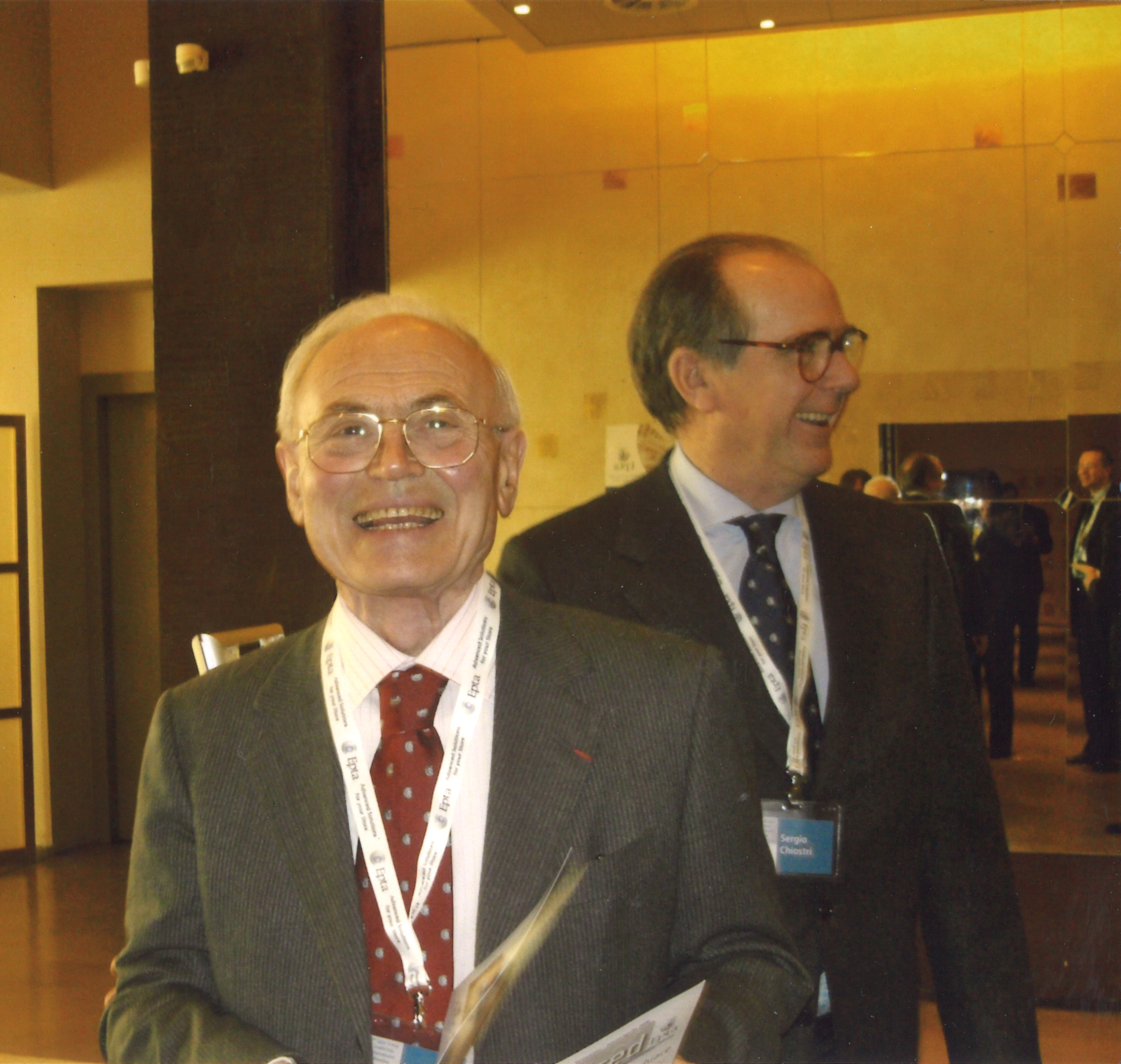
Luigi Nocivelli and Sergio Chiostri

In 2002 it became clear that El.Fi as a whole could not return to what it was. It was necessary to keep the healthy parts of the business and start again from there: Luigi and Gianfranco separated the air-conditioning sector from the refrigeration sector.

Paolo Nocivelli, Gianfranco's son, took over the management of Argo. Commercial refrigeration remained with Luigi and his son Marco, who was already the CEO of Costan. Luigi focused on the strategic development of the company with the vision that Costan, Bonnet Névé and George Barker could be the foundations for a large and well-structured group that would comprehensively develop the commercial refrigeration sector. Having learned from his past errors, he set out to rebuild his credentials as an entrepreneur by always trying to correct and improve himself.

In the refrigeration market El.Fi companies were independent and only received financial coordination. But an alternative model was chosen to bring the group forward. Luigi renamed it Epta, placing at the core of this venture the symbolic value of the family and his seven children. An operational holding Company was set up with registered offices in Milan. Luigi Nocivelli was the chairman, and Sergio Chiostri, his friend and trusted advisor, became the CEO. Things started slowly in 2003 but the trend was quickly reversed. Luigi had previously been at the helm of a network of independent companies, but now found himself governing a centralized system, the solidity of which came from the very size of the group and the diversification of risk through its operations across various markets and geographical areas. Despite being diagnosed in 2004 with mesothelioma, a tumour in his lungs, Luigi Nocivelli remained active and determined and always remained focused on the growth of Epta, until his death in December 2006. Epta, the company created by Luigi Nocivelli, is today managed by his son Marco Nocivelli and can boast a turnover of more than 800 million in 2016, over 4000 employees, and a commercial presence in 35 Countries producing 200,000 units/annum.

== Honours and awards ==
In 2009 his widow Barbara set up the Nocivelli Award in his memory, a cultural festival promoting contemporary art, which Nocivelli himself was passionate about.

In 2016–2017, to commemorate Nocivelli, a friend and supporter of FAI (Fondo Ambiente Italiano, usually referred to in English as the Italian National Trust), the family contributed to the refurbishment of the facades and colonnade of the Abbey in San Fruttuoso, one of the artistic and architectural assets protected by FAI.

Chevalier de la Légion d'honneur - seat of the Ministry of International Cooperation in Paris, 13 July 1998

== Bibliography ==
- Luca Masia, Luigi Nocivelli, Mondadori, 2016
