= Lodrino, Lombardy =

Lodrino Ludrì
- Comune
- Comune di Lodrino
- Location within Italy Location within Lombardy
- Coordinates: 45°43′N 10°17′E
- Country: Italy
- Region: Lombardy
- Province: Brescia (BS)
- Frazioni: Invico

Area
  - Total: 16 km^{2} (6.2 sq mi)

Population (2011)
  - Total: 1,773
  - Density: 110/km^{2} (290/sq mi)
- Time zone: UTC+1 (CET)
  - Summer (DST): UTC+2 (CEST)
- Postal code: 25060
- Dialing code: 030
- ISTAT code: 017090
- Website: Official website

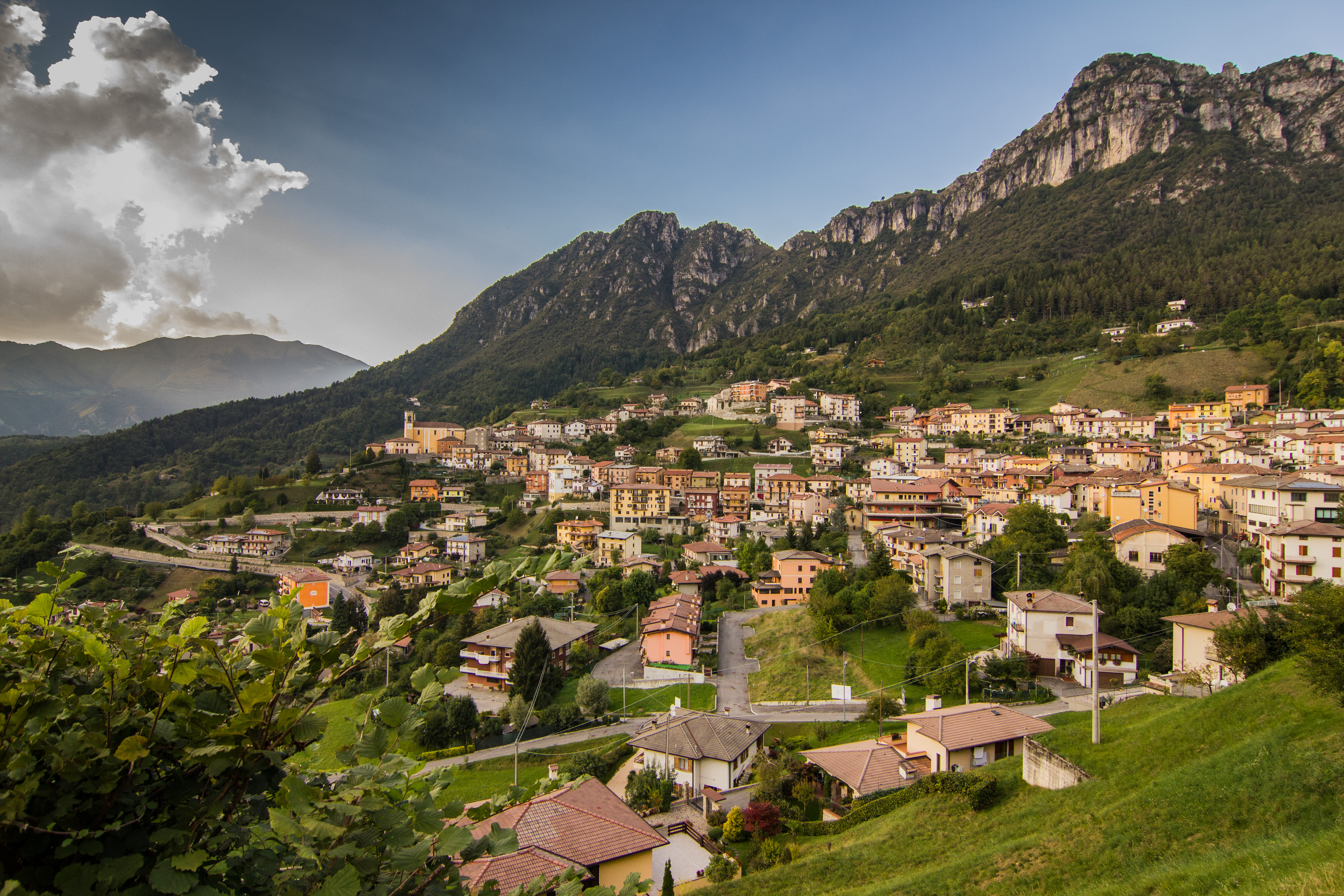

Lodrino (Brescian: Ludrì) is a village and comune in the province of Brescia, in Lombardy, Italy. Neighbouring communes are Casto, Marcheno, Marmentino, Pertica Alta and Tavernole sul Mella. It is situated between the Trompia valley and Val Sabbia.
