= Collio =

Collio may refer to:

- Collio, Lombardy, Italy, a town
- Ivet Lalova-Collio (born 1984), Bulgarian sprinter
- Simone Collio (born 1979), Italian sprinter
- Collio Goriziano, also known as Collio, an Italian wine and winemaking region
