= Gardone =

Gardone may refer to:

- Gardone Riviera, town and comune in the province of Brescia, in Lombardy, Italy
- Gardone Val Trompia, town and comune in the province of Brescia, in Lombardy, Italy.
