= Bovegno =

Bovegno Böegn
- Comune
- Comune di Bovegno
- Coat of arms

- Location within Italy Location within Lombardy
- Coordinates: 45°47′N 10°16′E
- Country: Italy
- Region: Lombardy
- Province: Brescia (BS)
- Frazioni: Castello, Graticelle, Ludizzo, Magno, Piano, Predondo, Savenone, Zigole

Government
  - Mayor: Manolo Rossini

Area
  - Total: 47 km^{2} (18 sq mi)
- Elevation: 680 m (2,230 ft)

Population (2011)
  - Total: 2,270
  - Density: 48/km^{2} (130/sq mi)
- Demonym: Bovegnesi
- Time zone: UTC+1 (CET)
  - Summer (DST): UTC+2 (CEST)
- Postal code: 25061
- Dialing code: 030
- ISTAT code: 017024
- Patron saint: St. George
- Website: Official website

Bovegno (Brescian: Böegn) (Note: Italian pronunciation: [boˈveɲɲo]) is a comune in the province of Brescia, in Lombardy. It borders the communes of Artogne, Berzo Inferiore, Bienno, Collio, Esine, Gianico, Irma, Marmentino and Pezzaze. It is located in the valley named Val Trompia.

The Brescian poet Angelo Canossi spent the last years of his life here, mainly at Cà de le bachere (now a national monument) in Val Sorda.

== Twin towns ==
- Narcao, Italy
