= Lodrino =

Lodrino may refer to:

- Lodrino, Lombardy, Italy
- Lodrino, Switzerland
