= Pezzaze =

Pezzaze Pedhadhe
- Comune
- Comune di Pezzaze
- Coat of arms

- Location within Italy Location within Lombardy
- Coordinates: 45°46′N 10°14′E
- Country: Italy
- Region: Lombardy
- Province: Brescia (BS)
- Frazioni: Lavone, Mondaro, Pezzazole, Stravignino

Government
  - Mayor: Sergio Richiedei

Area
  - Total: 21 km^{2} (8.1 sq mi)

Population (2011)
  - Total: 1,587
  - Density: 76/km^{2} (200/sq mi)
- Demonym: Pezzazesi
- Time zone: UTC+1 (CET)
  - Summer (DST): UTC+2 (CEST)
- Postal code: 25060
- Dialing code: 030
- ISTAT code: 017141
- Website: Official website

Pezzaze (Brescian: Pezàze; locally Pedhadhe) is a comune in the province of Brescia, in Lombardy. Neighbouring communes are Bovegno, Tavernole sul Mella and Pisogne.
