= Bovezzo =

Bovezzo Boès
- Comune
- Comune di Bovezzo
- Location within Italy Location within Lombardy
- Coordinates: 45°35′N 10°15′E
- Country: Italy
- Region: Lombardy
- Province: Brescia
- Frazioni: Conicchio, Sant'Onofrio

Area
  - Total: 6.35 km^{2} (2.45 sq mi)
- Elevation: 203 m (666 ft)

Population (2011)
  - Total: 7,582
  - Density: 1,190/km^{2} (3,090/sq mi)
- Demonym: Bovezzesi
- Time zone: UTC+1 (CET)
  - Summer (DST): UTC+2 (CEST)
- Postal code: 25073
- Dialing code: 030
- ISTAT code: 017025
- Patron saint: St. Apollonio vescovo
- Saint day: 7 July
- Website: Official website

Bovezzo (Brescian: Boès) is a comune (municipality) in the province of Brescia, in Lombardy, Italy.
