= Pertica Alta =

Pertica Alta Pèrtega Àlta
- Comune
- Comune di Pertica Alta
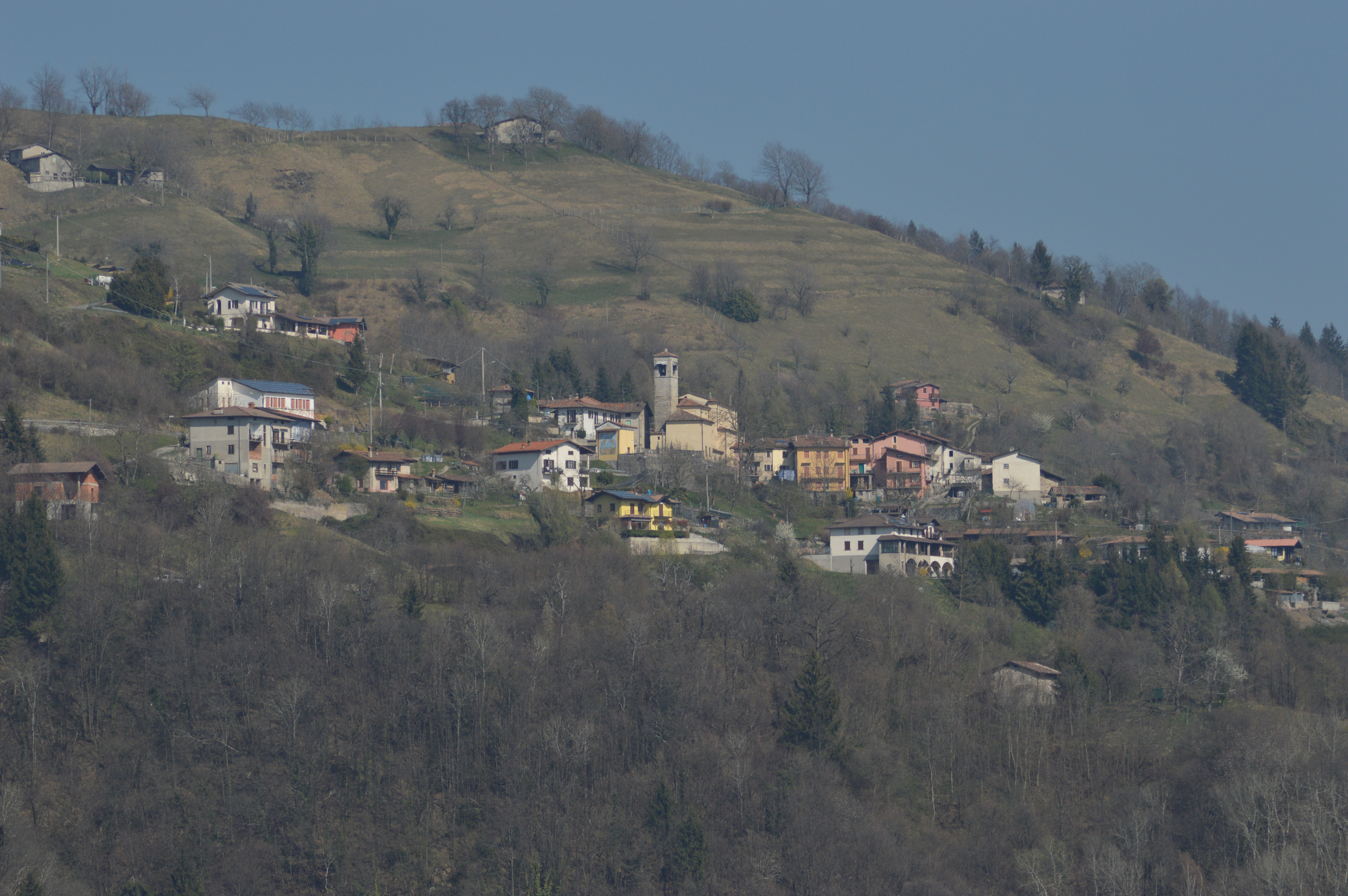
- Belprato seen from Mura

- Location within Italy Location within Lombardy
- Coordinates: 45°45′N 10°21′E
- Country: Italy
- Region: Lombardy
- Province: Brescia (BS)
- Frazioni: Lavino, Navono, Noffo, Odeno, Livemmo (town hall), Belprato

Government
  - Mayor: Giovanmaria Flocchini, since 8-June-2009 (Lega Nord)

Area
  - Total: 20.92 km^{2} (8.08 sq mi)
- Elevation: 900 m (3,000 ft)

Population (30 November 2021)
  - Total: 595
  - Density: 28.4/km^{2} (73.7/sq mi)
- Time zone: UTC+1 (CET)
  - Summer (DST): UTC+2 (CEST)
- Postal code: 25070
- Dialing code: 0365
- Website: Official website

Pertica Alta (Brescian: Pèrtega Àlta) is a comune, an Italian town of 559 inhabitants in the province of Brescia, in Lombardy. It is located in the upper part of the province and belongs to the Valle Sabbia mountain community.

Neighboring municipalities are Casto, Collio, Lodrino, Marmentino, Mura, Pertica Bassa. and Vestone.

== Physical geography ==
Pertica Alta is located in the upper part of the province of Brescia, in Lombardy. It is located between the Val Trompia and the Valle Sabbia, circumscribed between the rivers Degnone and Tovere. The territory of Pertica Alta historically and geographically belongs to the Valle Sabbia. It lies in an area of low seismicity (seismic zone 3). [2] It belongs to Climate zone F, 3 496 GG [3]

== Origin of the name ==
The origin of the name is to be found in the Langobard custom, according to which the relatives of a warrior lost or fallen in battle far from home erected a pole (Italian: pertica) mounted with a simulacrum of a dove facing the direction of the battle. Inhabitants of Pertica Alta are called Perticaroli.

== History ==
The municipality of Pertica Alta was created in 1928 when the municipalities of Bel Prato, Livemmo and Navono were merged. The territory of Pertica Alta is a portion of the "Universitas Perticae Vallis Sabbi", a supra-municipal organization existing since 1382. Until 1797, this organization included today's territory of Pertica Bassa and the towns of Bisenzio and Presegno, which belong to the municipal administration of Lavenone.

== Symbols ==
Pertica Alta's coat of arms and the banner were granted by decree of the President of the Republic of May 13, 2003. "Compounded in a band: the first, in blue, with a star of six rays, in silver; the second, of silver, with two bands, of azure; the third, in red, to the small silver temple, enclosed in black, with four columns, two on each side, supporting the strong tympanum, this small temple with crepidoma of two steps, founded on a plain of green, accompanied by two firs, one and one, green, natural stems, knotted onto the plain. exterior ornaments of the comune." The banner background is a green cloth.

The current coat of arms does not incorporate any of the elements present on the emblems of the municipalities which formed it: an ox passing through Livemmo, three border stones placed side by side for Navono, a rampant lion for Odeno. Instead, it is a variation of the one freely adopted by the municipality with a resolution of 6 January 1950, which depicted two blue bands for Belprato, symbolizing the course of the rivers Tovere and Degnone; the Roman sacellum on whose ruins the ancient church of Sant'Andrea, known as "dei Morti", of Barbaine was built according to tradition, flanked by two firs, exemplary trees which grow in the local wood; the silver star for Navono, symbolizing the dependent fractions.

== Society ==
As of 30 November 2021, there were 595 inhabitants living in Pertica Alta.

From May 27, 1990, until June 14, 1999, the Mayor was Walter Lionello Piccini from the democrazia Cristiana.

From June 14, 1999, until June 8, 2009, the Mayor was Denis Alessandro Zanolini from Lega Nord.

Since June 8, 2009 the acting Mayor has been Giovanmaria Flocchini from Lega Nord.

== Human geography ==
The municipality of Pertica Alta is divided into six hamlets:

- Lavino, seat of the preschool and of the primary school which form the Comprehensive Institute of Vestone;
- Navono;
- Noffo, an agglomeration of more recently built houses compared to the other hamlets. The town, unlike the others, has no church, so local Catholics have traditionally been referred to the parish church of Lavino dedicated to San Michele Arcangelo;
- Oden;
- Livemmo, seat of the municipality, the rectory, of the Interactive Center of Museum Studies of the Pre-Alpine Culture of Pertica Alta and of the "Maria Leali" municipal library. It is known for its mountain walks and carnival parade. In 2018, Livemmo's 196 residents had a birthrate of near zero and civic life was at a low point, but it invested in a small grocery store. In 2022, it received nearly 20 million euros in COVID recovery funds for Italy allocated by the European Union.
- Belprato. It was an independent municipality until 1928 with the name Bel Prato. Until 1863 it was simply called Prato, but the prefix "Bel" was added with royal decree 11 January 1863, number 1126, in order to distinguish it from other homonymous municipalities of the kingdom of Italy.

Pertica Alta is crossed by the provincial road SP50 Tavernole-Nozza; this branches off from the municipality of Tavernole sul Mella and connects the Trompia Valley to the Sabbia Valley through the Termine Pass, the border point between the municipalities of Marmentino and Pertica Alta and, in full, between the Trompia and Sabbia valleys. Within the municipality of Pertica Alta it connects the villages of Lavino, Odeno, Livemmo and Belprato, then descending to the center of Nozza, a hamlet in the municipality of Vestone.

Pertica Alta is connected to the nearby municipality of Pertica Bassa by SP110 Forno d'Ono - Livemmo, a road that branches off from the town of Forno d'Ono di Pertica Bassa and crossing the hamlet of Avenone, joins up with SP50 Tavernole-Vestone in Livemmo di Pertica Alta.
