= FAMARS =

Italian gun manufacturer

Fabbrica Armi di Abbiatico e Salvinelli
- Industry: Firearms
- Founded: 1967; 59 years ago
- Founders: Mario Abbiatico, Remo Salvinelli
- Headquarters: Gardone, Italy
- Key people: Cristina Abbiatico, CEO
- Products: Shotguns, Rifles
- Website: www.famars.com

FAMARS, or Fabbrica Armi d’Abbiatico e Salvinelli, is an Italian gunmaker that manufactures bespoke shotguns and rifles. The company is best known for its patented detachable-lock designs and handcrafted woodwork and engraving. FAMARS is considered one of the top Italian gun manufacturers.

The name FAMARS is an acronym for Fabbrica Armi di Mario Abbiatico e Remo Salvinelli (Arms Fabrications of Mario Abbiatico and Remo Salvinelli).

== History ==
In 1967, Mario Abbiatico and Remo Salvinelli became part of the famous Gardone Val Trompia gun tradition when they founded FAMARS. Both the Salvinelli and the Abbiatico families had a history in the craft going back several generations. Remo’s father, Felice Salvinelli, was an engraver in Brescia, where he first met Mario’s father, Giuseppe Abbiatico, who was an actioner.

Initially, the company focused on small-bore shotguns ranging in quality and decoration. American businessman Joe Bojalad, a gun connoisseur and collector influenced the two founders to specialize in the fine gun category. In 1967, Bojalad was referred to FAMARS by another Italian gun manufacturer named Beretta. His request was an over/under shotgun with interchangeable barrels, adorned with engraving art. Upon receiving his first FAMARS gun, Bojalad was so impressed that he placed several more orders and became a lifelong client of Abbiatico and Salvinelli. In 1975 Mario and Remo, considering the advice of Bojalad, made the decision to focus solely on bespoke guns. Each gun produced thereafter was a bespoke gun bearing the name ‘Abbiatico & Salvinelli’ and a unique serial number.

The move to specialize in bespoke shotguns stimulated much innovation within the FAMARS factory in the following years. Inspired by Mario’s fascination with hammerguns, the Castore was created — the first-ever self-cocking hammer gun with a single trigger and automatic ejectors. The success and popularity of the Castore model prompted several other arms manufacturers to attempt imitations. In the late 1970s, shortly after the development of the Castore, FAMARS released the Quattrocanne, an original four-barrel model that fires with a single trigger. A limited run of only 30 guns was made, one of which is showcased in the historical Beretta Gallery in Italy, making FAMARS the only outside manufacturer to be shown within the gun gallery.

The next major innovation was the development of the Jorema, a Boss-style over/under shotgun that used a pinless sidelock design patented by Remo Salvinelli. This model drew on input from FAMARS’ long-time client Joe Bojalad. It incorporated several patented features. The Jorema concept would eventually evolve into the company’s flagship model, the Sovereign.

In the early 1980s, Mario and Remo released the Tribute, a side-by-side built with a detachable boxlock. The design was inspired by the Westley Richards side-by-side. This was the final model that Mario Abbiatico designed before he fell sick with cancer in 1984. From the late 1980s into the 2000s (decade), with Cristina Abbiatico now in charge, FAMARS would release several new models, including the most popular Excalibur, the Poseidon, and most recently, the Leonardo.

== Today ==
Cristina Abbiatico serves as the president and CEO of FAMARS. She is the daughter of founder Mario Abbiatico and works alongside her brother Paolo. When she was only 18 years old, she entered the firm to fill her father's shoes. With Remo Salvinelli building FAMARS guns and Cristina managing the commercial side of the business, FAMARS popularity grew drastically beginning in the 1980s. Cristina is married to Marco Cavazzoni, the owner of Il Bulino, a company founded in 2006 that specializes in Italian engraving and decorates the FAMARS guns.

All production takes place at the FAMARS factory, in Gardone Val Trompia, a small city nestled between the foothills of the Italian Alps. A single FAMARS gun requires hundreds, sometimes thousands, of man-hours to complete. The firm produces no more than 110 guns in any year. Today, FAMARS combines modern technology with its traditional gunmaking techniques. The company utilizes computer numerical control and spark erosion technology to create precision parts critical for gun reliability. Processes such as shaping of receivers, wood carving, stock finishing, barrel shaping, soldering, and engraving are still performed by hand.

FAMARS is considered one of the top Italian gun makers to rival English best guns, according to Field & Stream magazine. Mike Yardley, a gun historian and journalist for several industry publications, describes FAMARS guns as 'superbly engraved, ergonomically efficient, brilliantly designed... with impeccable fit and finish'. The National Rifle Association in the U.S. showcases six FAMARS models at its museum in Fairfax, Virginia.

== FAMARS USA ==
In 2010, FAMARS launched a new venture, FAMARS USA, in partnership with international real estate developer and best gun collector Paul Mihailides. FAMARS USA was created to expand the company's servicing abilities and product offers, with new products including knives, gun equipment and accessories, clothing, and sportsman jewelry. Its first release was the Lama, a double-action automatic knife.

== Patents ==
Mario Abbiatico and Remo Salvinelli patented several mechanical designs in their 17 years together. The FAMARS 'droplock' is a patented mechanism that is fully removable from the lock of the shotgun or rifle, whereas most other companies do not offer this feature. The trigger plate detaches from the lock and allows for a full display and examination of the locking mechanism. The company holds other patents for a hidden screw removable side-lock, and a unique hinge for the forend iron that promotes faster and easier reloading by allowing the action to swing down farther than normal. Other innovations include: a Boss-style over/under with a pinless lock; self-cocking hammer guns; two versions of a four-barreled shotgun; and drop-lock side-by-side long guns.

== Models ==
- Tucano
- Sovereign
- Castore
- P.Constantine v
- Tribute
- Zeus
- Rombo
- Africa Express
- Venus
- Venus Express
- Avantis
- Excalibur Sporting
- Excalibur Round Body
- Sportivo
- Antares
- Poseidon
- Leonardo

== See also ==
- List of Italian companies
- List of modern armament manufacturers
