= Collio, Lombardy =

Collio Còi
- Comune
- Comune di Collio
- Location within Italy Location within Lombardy
- Coordinates: 45°48′40″N 10°20′0″E
- Country: Italy
- Region: Lombardy
- Province: Brescia (BS)
- Frazioni: Memmo, San Colombano, Tizio

Area
  - Total: 53 km^{2} (20 sq mi)

Population (2011)
  - Total: 2,267
  - Density: 43/km^{2} (110/sq mi)
- Demonym: Colliensi
- Time zone: UTC+1 (CET)
  - Summer (DST): UTC+2 (CEST)
- Postal code: 25060
- Dialing code: 030
- ISTAT code: 017058
- Website: Official website

Collio (Brescian: Còi) is a town and comune in the province of Brescia, in Lombardy, Italy. Neighbouring communes are Bagolino, Bienno, Bovegno, Lavenone, Marmentino, Pertica Alta and Pertica Bassa.

== Twin towns ==
Collio is twinned with:

- Castroreale, Italy
- Gonnesa, Italy
