= Giacinto Gaggia =

Italian Roman Catholic prelate

The Most Reverend Giacinto Gaggia
- Bishop of Brescia
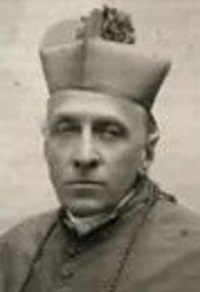
- The bishop pictured sometime in the 1910s.
- Church: Roman Catholic Church
- Diocese: Brescia
- See: Brescia
- Installed: 28 October 1913
- Term ended: 15 April 1933
- Predecessor: Giacomo Corna-Pellegrini
- Successor: Giacinto Tredici
- Previous posts: Auxiliary Bishop of Brescia (1909-13); Titular Bishop of Hadrumetum (1909-13); Titular Archbishop of Traianopolis in Rhodope (1930-33)

Orders
- Ordination: 2 April 1870 by Girolamo Verzeri
- Consecration: 3 May 1909 by Francesco di Paolo Satolli

Personal details
- Born: Giacinto Gaggia; 8 October 1847 Verolanuova, Brescia, Lombardy, Kingdom of Lombardy–Venetia
- Died: 15 April 1933 (aged 85) Brescia, Kingdom of Italy

Ordination history of Giacinto Gaggia
History
Episcopal consecration
- Principal consecrator: Francesco Satolli
- Co-consecrators: Prospero Saccia; Henri Doulcet C.P.
Episcopal succession
Bishops consecrated by Giacinto Gaggia as principal consecrator
- Emilio Bongiorni: 20 March 1916
- Egisto Domenico Melchiori: 15 June 1924
- Domenico Guido Menna: 6 January 1929
- Emiliano Giuseppe Lonati O.F.M. Cap.: 8 June 1930
- Mario Toccabelli: 26 October 1930

Styles of Giacinto Gaggia
- Reference style: The Most Reverend
- Spoken style: Your Grace
- Religious style: Archbishop

Giacinto Gaggia (8 October 1847 - 15 April 1933) was an Italian Roman Catholic prelate who served as the Bishop of Brescia from 1913 until his death. Ordained in Rome in 1870, he was consecrated to the episcopate in 1909 and made an archbishop in 1930. He ordained Giovanni Battista Montini (the future Pope Paul VI) to the priesthood in mid-1920.

Gaggia was born in the Brescia province to Emmanuele Giacomo Gaggia and Angela Boninsegna di Manerbio. He received the subdiaconate in Brescia on 19 December 1868 and was later elevated to the diaconate also in Brescia on 31 October 1869. He was ordained in Rome since his diocesan bishop was in Rome for the First Vatican Council that Pope Pius IX had convoked. He was consecrated to the episcopate in the Lateran Basilica in 1909.

Gaggia died in 1933.
