= Gardone Val Trompia =

Gardone Val Trompia Gardù de Altrompia
- Comune
- Città di Gardone Val Trompia
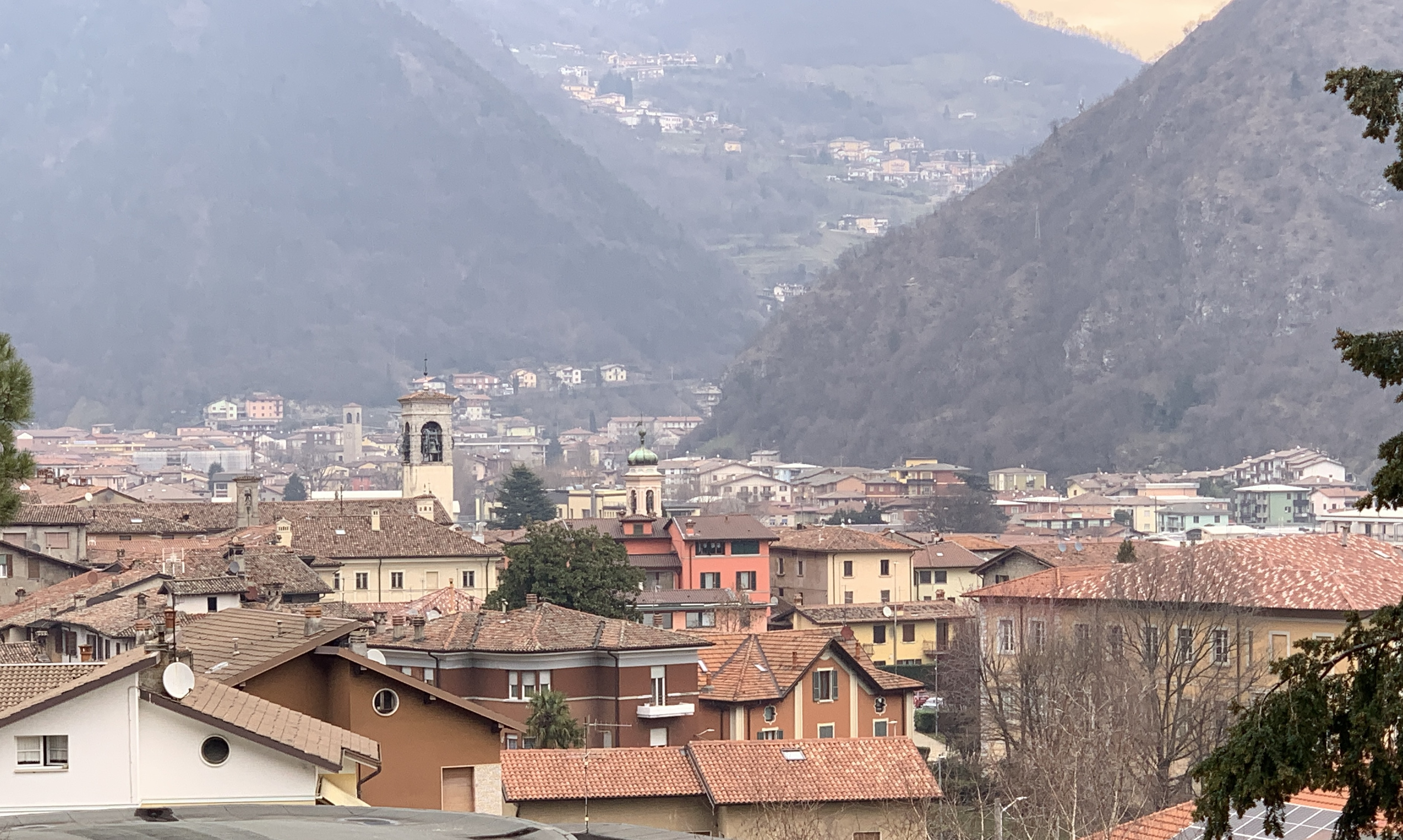
- View from middle schools

- Coat of arms

- Location within Italy Location within Lombardy
- Coordinates: 45°41′N 10°11′E
- Country: Italy
- Region: Lombardy
- Province: Brescia (BS)
- Frazioni: Inzino, Magno

Government
  - Mayor: Giuliano Brunori

Area
  - Total: 26.66 km^{2} (10.29 sq mi)
- Elevation: 332 m (1,089 ft)

Population (30 July 2021)
  - Total: 11,374
  - Density: 426.6/km^{2} (1,105/sq mi)
- Demonym: Gardonesi
- Time zone: UTC+1 (CET)
  - Summer (DST): UTC+2 (CEST)
- Postal code: 25063
- Dialing code: 030
- Patron saint: St. Mark
- Saint day: 25 April
- Website: Official website

Gardone Val Trompia (Brescian: Gardù de Altrompia) is a town and comune in the province of Brescia, in Lombardy, northern Italy. It is bounded by the comunes of Marcheno and Sarezzo. It is located in the Trompia valley. Gardone received the honorary title of city with a presidential decree on 21 September 2001.

== Commerce ==
It is home to the major small arms manufacturers FAMARS and Fabbrica d'Armi Pietro Beretta. Beretta started in 1526 in the commune. The company supplied Napoleon as well as the Italian Army.

Among several regional makers of replica black powder firearms (such as A. Uberti, Srl., and Chiappa Firearms), the Davide Pedersoli company leads in production of over 75 types of historical black powder muzzle loading and breech loading firearms and is also known as the dominant brand in black powder shooting competitions worldwide.

== Twin towns ==
Gardone Val Trompia is twinned with:

- Nanoro Department, Burkina Faso

== People ==
- Bartolomeo Beretta (c. 1490 – c. 1565), founder of Beretta
