= Collebeato =

Collebeato Cobiàt
- Comune
- Comune di Collebeato
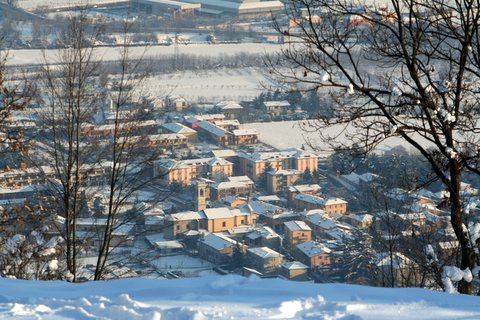

- Coat of arms

- Location within Italy Location within Lombardy
- Coordinates: 45°35′N 10°13′E
- Country: Italy
- Region: Lombardy
- Province: Brescia (BS)

Government
  - Mayor: Antonio Trebeschi

Area
  - Total: 5 km^{2} (1.9 sq mi)
- Elevation: 200 m (660 ft)

Population (2011)
  - Total: 4,740
  - Density: 950/km^{2} (2,500/sq mi)
- Demonym: Collebeatesi
- Time zone: UTC+1 (CET)
  - Summer (DST): UTC+2 (CEST)
- Postal code: 25060
- Dialing code: 030
- Patron saint: St. Paul
- Saint day: 25 January
- Website: Official website

Collebeato (Brescian: Cobiàt) is a town and comune in the province of Brescia, in Lombardy, Italy. It is located on the right bank of the river Mella, 5 kilometres (3.1 mi) north of Brescia.

== Geography ==
Collebeato, in the northern hinterland of Brescia, is enclosed between the Picastello, Campiani, Peso, Dosso Boscone and Sasso mountains. It is located where the lower Val Trompia meets the Po Valley, on the easternmost border of Franciacorta. The Mella river flows through the municipality.

== History ==
In Roman times, the Collebeato area was a hilly area that was not very inhabited close to the marshes created by the river Mella. Very few finds have been found: four sepulchral stones of the imperial age and the remains of the ancient Roman route that from Brixia across the Crotte Bridge led to the Trompia Valley climbing up the hills. In 958, in the diploma of Berengario II and Adalberto, a church dedicated to San Paolo appears as the property of the Abbey of Leno, this is probably the first reference to the community of Collebeato.

In 1014 the name Cubiadum (Cubiado) appears explicitly for the first time among the properties of the Abbey of Leno in the imperial diploma of Henry II. The etymology of the name derives from the Latin "copulatum" and means "coupled". The name also recurs in the diploma of Henry II of 1019 and then in those of Corrado II of 1026 and 1036 and is present in papal bulls and imperial diplomas up to 1434. The Benedictine monks of Leno provided for extensive reclamation of the Mella marshes. Next to the territories managed by the abbots there is a municipal neighborhood in the lands from which the bishop of Brescia tithes. From 1186 to 1194 the notary Gerardus de Cubiado was active, appointed by the emperor Frederick Barbarossa. We have received eight documents signed by him. In 1194 (November 15) a trial was held to determine whether the Cubiado landholdings were under the Abbot of Leno or under the Bishop of Brescia. The two elderly heads of families of Cubiado Villano di Fra Le Corti and Alberto da Pozzo testify. In 1274, Father Giovanni da Cobiado was director of the hospital complex of the Church of San Giacomo al Mella, on the road from Brescia to Milan.

In 1280 Cobiato is counted among the municipalities that must keep the Ponte delle Crotte on the road to Brescia. On 1 December 1336 Jacopo da Cobiado, a physician in Brescia, is counted as a witness in a feudal investiture in the city with the bishop Giacomo de Actis. In 1483 the Venetian nobleman Marco Sanuto described in his itinerary in the Venetian mainland the "beautiful garden" of the noble Count Antonio Martinengo. In the 15th century Collebeato became a holiday resort for nobles and religious of the city of Brescia for the summer season, important villas and two monasteries (Santa Croce and Santo Stefano) were built. In 1512 Collebeato suffered a military siege by French soldiers who attacked the Venetian Brescia. Mariotto Martinengo, inspired by the destruction of the battles, wrote the poem in the Italian vernacular "The Weeping of the god Pan for the ruin of Colle beato", using for the first time the poetic name "Colle-beato" instead of the more medieval "Cobiato". In the Renaissance and humanistic climate brought by the nobles who vacationed in Collebeato, in addition to the development of villas and palaces, local artistic workers were also born, among these a painter and decorator native of the village Jacobino da Cobiato was active in the sixteenth century, of which however no works are known. In 1554 Galeazzo dai Orzi, Mariotto Martinengo's secretary, published in Brescia a first edition of the poem in the vernacular of Brescia "La massera da bé" (the good housewife), the first book that ennobles the Brescia language as a literary language. The protagonist of the book is the housewife Flor da Coblat. In 1565 the Venetian version of the book came out. In 1609 the Venetian Giovanni Da Lezze described the territory of Cobiato, the villas and religious buildings in the Bresciano Catastic. In 1640 the Municipality of Cobiato endowed itself with precise statutes for the administration of the waters and to regulate common life. In 1640 the Municipality of Cobiato endowed itself with precise statutes for the administration of the waters and to regulate common life. In 1701 the official use of the name Collebeato began on French maps and from 1779 on the Lombard-Venetian maps the name will officially remain this. From 1770 to 1794 the notary Bartolomeo Mattanza was active in Collebeato. From 1737 to 1800 the notary Gaetano Bonera was active. In 1833 the patrimony of the Martinengo Counts, on the death of Girolamo Silvio Martinengo, a Venetian noble (translator of Milton's Paradise Lost in 1801), passed to his cousin Alessandro Molin and through his daughter, Maria, to the Friulian counts Panciera di Zoppola still owners of the gardens and the splendid villa. In 1850, Count Giuseppe Torre at the gardens of his villa (the current Parco 1º Maggio) selected a new type of flower, the Camelia Japonica "Vergine di Collebeato", a very particular type of white camellia with concentric spirals, described and admired in the 1857 by the statesman Giuseppe Zanardelli in one of his letters. From 1851 to 1856 Collebeato was the center of the Risorgimento riots in Brescia, where Mazzinians, who were housed and hidden in the villas and courtyards of the town, took refuge; an underground printing house was installed there. The patriot Tito Speri gathered and trained the anti-Austrian revolutionary troops in the country's fields. In 1889 the priest, writer and intellectual Pietro Rigosa was born in Collebeato. He had as a pupil and friend Giovan Battista Montini (future Pope Paul VI), he wrote many short stories, including The Lion of Brescia (Gatti, Brescia 1932), a novel set in Collebeato and dedicated to the life of Tito Speri. In 1910 the industrialist and benefactor Filippo Rovetta imported American peach seedlings from Louisiana and in 1919 he started a large-scale production of peaches, tilling large plots of land in the north of the country, still existing orchards today. The example was soon followed by all the landowners in the country transforming local agriculture in a radical way. Collebeato was the main producer of peaches in the Brescia area until the 1940s and among the main nationally producing over ninety different species of peaches. In 1936 the "Dopolavoro" organized the first Peach Festival, a festival for which the town is still renowned in the province of Brescia. From 1956 to 1965 the quarry and factory of the CEMBRE cement factory were active, an activity that led to the decline of fish farming due to the environmental incompatibility between the two production activities that insisted on the same territory. After the war the building expansion of the town began, first with the villages of the white cooperatives of Father Ottorino Marcolini in the fifties and sixties and in the following years with red cooperatives. Today the flat territory is almost completely built of villas and condominiums with a large garden. The prestigious residential area is part of the "Parco delle Colline" area. In September 2012, the new sports center was completed, a work that completely redeveloped the area of the former Cembre cement factory. In 2018 Collebeato won the "La Città per il Verde 2018" award. The award was unanimously awarded by the jury of the XIX edition in recognition of the environmental validity of the "Ecological Corridor of the Mella River".

== Twinnings ==
- Bivona, Italy, since 2004
