= Zone, Lombardy =

Zone Sù (Lombard)
- Comune
- Comune di Zone
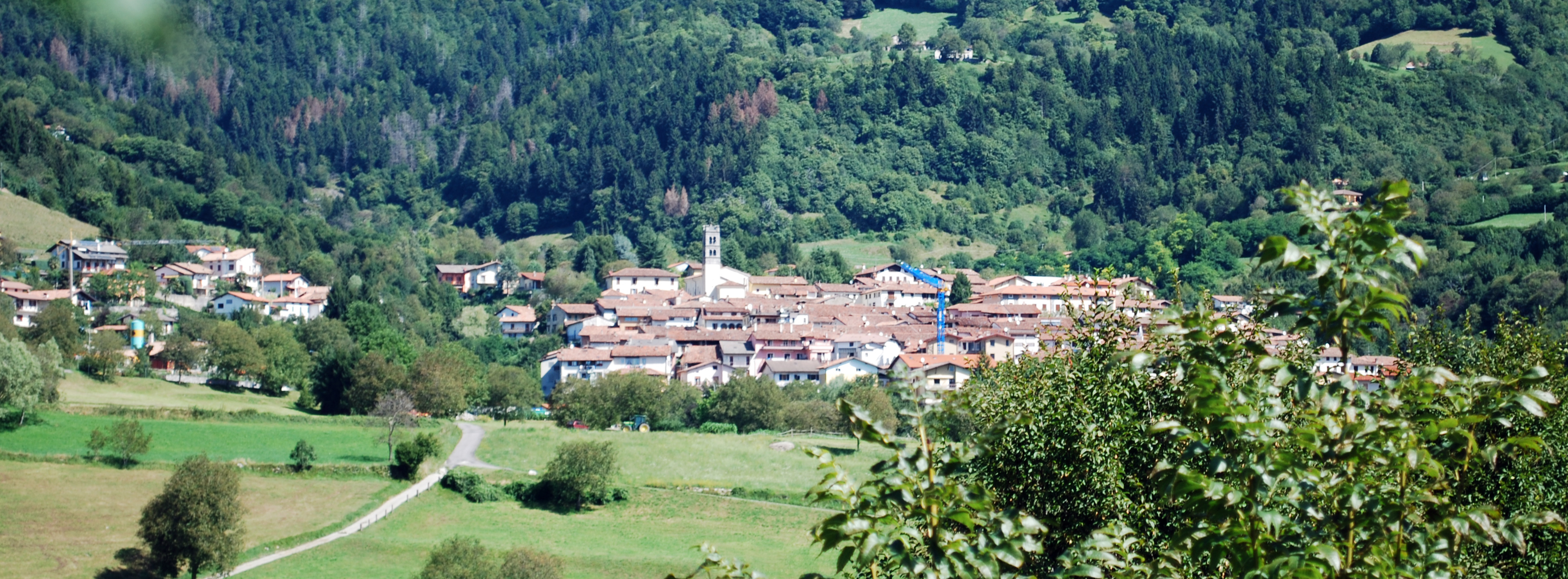

- Location within Italy Location within Lombardy
- Coordinates: 45°46′N 10°7′E
- Country: Italy
- Region: Lombardy
- Province: Brescia (BS)

Government
  - Mayor: Marco Antonio Zatti

Area
  - Total: 19.68 km^{2} (7.60 sq mi)

Population (31 July 2021)
  - Total: 1,047
  - Density: 53.20/km^{2} (137.8/sq mi)
- Demonym: Zonesi
- Time zone: UTC+1 (CET)
  - Summer (DST): UTC+2 (CEST)
- Postal code: 25050
- Dialing code: 030
- Website: Official website

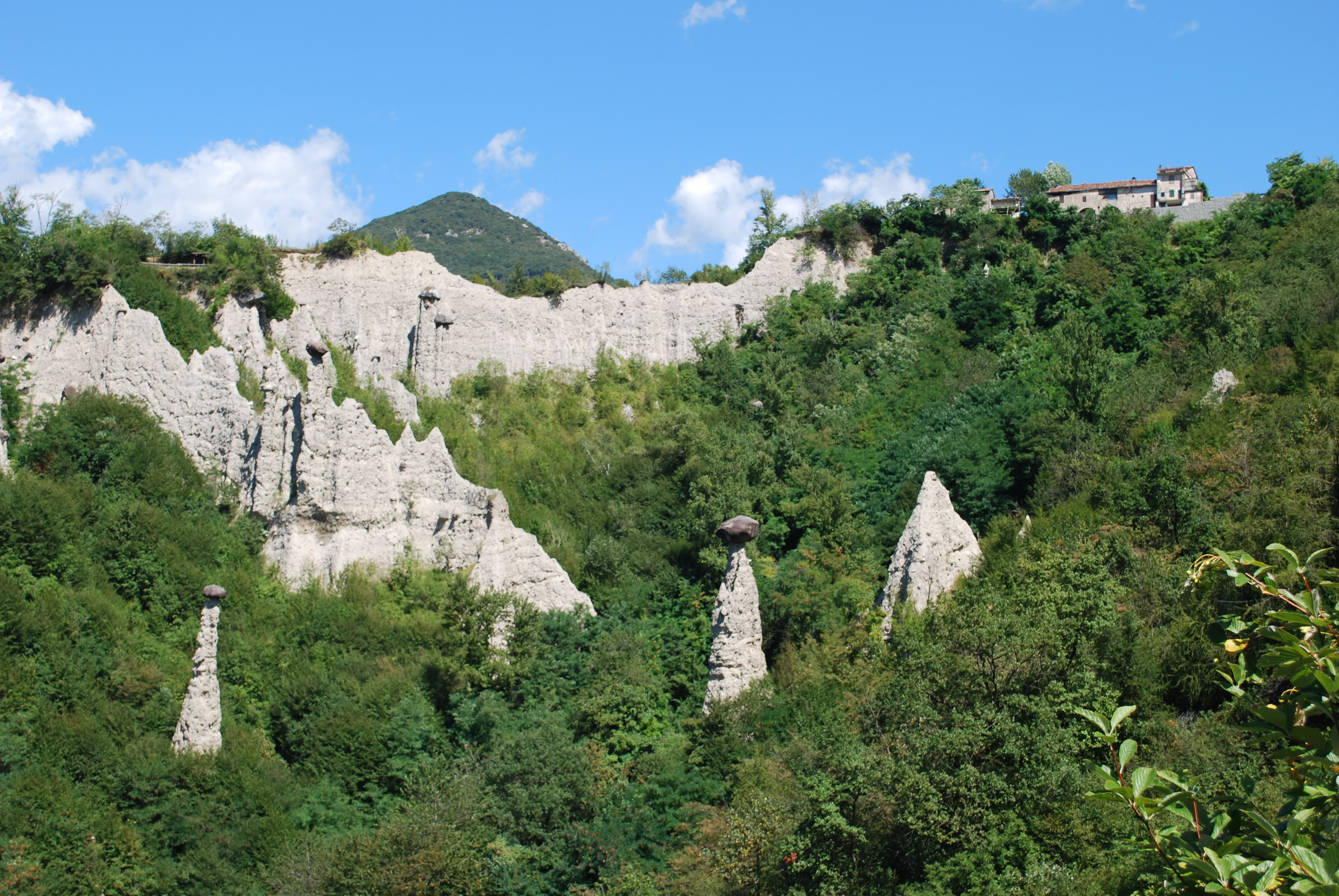

Zone (Brescian: Sù) is a comune in the province of Brescia, in Lombardy, northern Italy. It is situated in a mountain valley east of Lake Iseo. The town is known for the nearby "Pyramids of Zone", formations of large rock pillars created by erosion. Its coat of arms shows three of these pillars.
