= Sarezzo =

Sarezzo Sarès
- Comune
- Comune di Sarezzo
- Location within Italy Location within Lombardy
- Coordinates: 45°39′N 10°12′E
- Country: Italy
- Region: Lombardy
- Province: Brescia (BS)
- Frazioni: Zanano, Ponte Zanano, Noboli, Valle di Sarezzo

Area
  - Total: 17 km^{2} (6.6 sq mi)

Population (31 December 2011)
  - Total: 13,547
  - Density: 800/km^{2} (2,100/sq mi)
- Demonym: Saretini
- Time zone: UTC+1 (CET)
  - Summer (DST): UTC+2 (CEST)
- Postal code: 25068
- Dialing code: 030
- Patron saint: San Faustino
- Saint day: 15 February
- Website: Official website

Sarezzo (Brescian: Sarès; locally Harèh) is a comune in the province of Brescia, in Lombardy. It is located in the Trompia valley. Neighbouring communes are Lumezzane, Villa Carcina, Polaveno and Gardone Val Trompia. In 2011 its population was 13,547. The comune is made of four frazioni (villages): Sarezzo, Zanano, Ponte Zanano, and Noboli, although today these have grown into each other and there is no visible distinction. Indeed, Sarezzo, 13 km from the city centre of Brescia, is today part its urban area (population 350,000).

== History ==
In 2006 Hina Saleem was murdered by her father in his house in the town.

== Twin towns ==
Sarezzo is twinned with:

- Oberhaslach, France
