= Mella (river) =

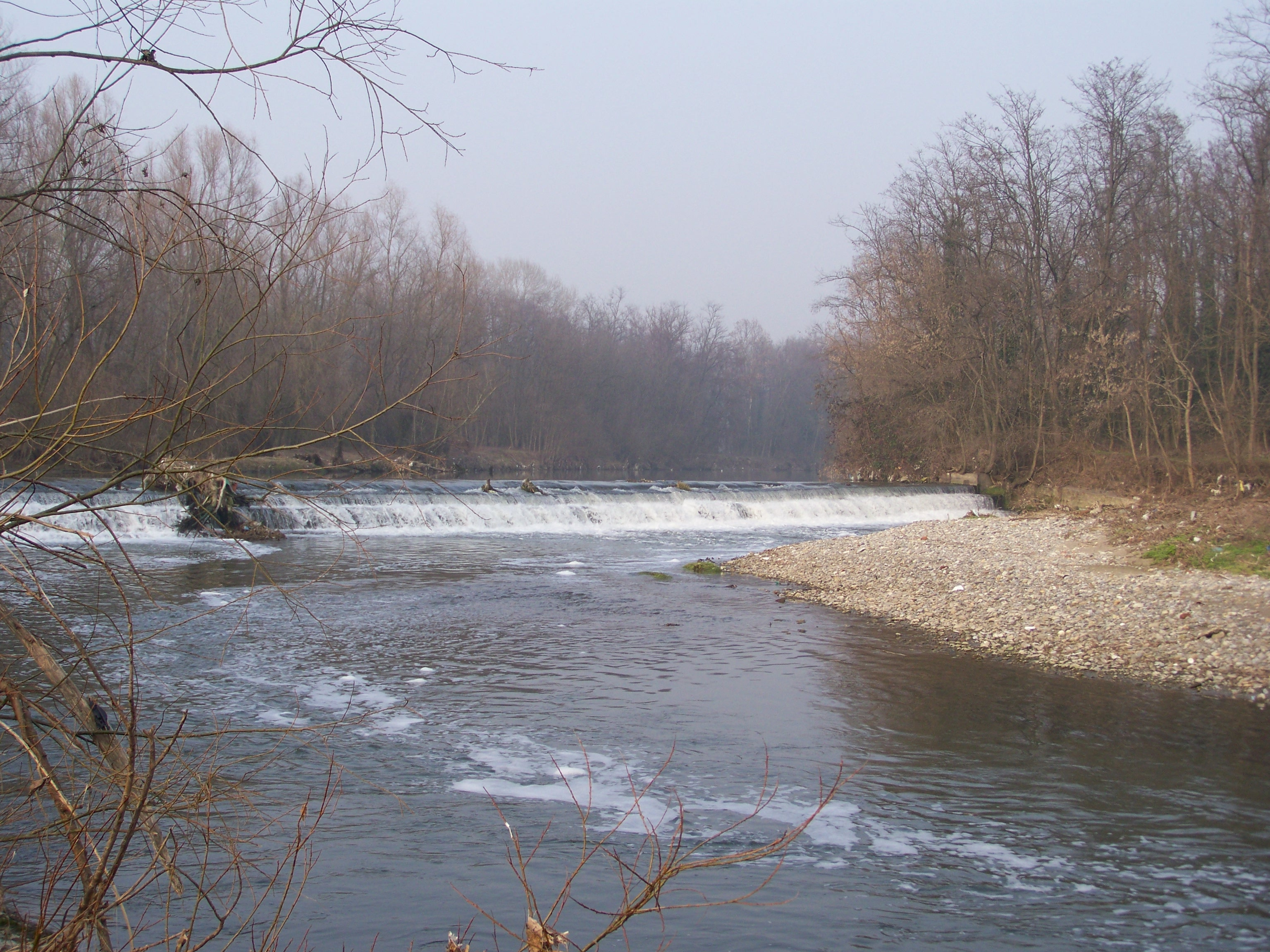
- The Mella near Offlaga

Location
- Country: Italy

Physical characteristics
- Source
  - location: Maniva Pass near Collio (BS)
- Mouth
  - location: Oglio river, near Ostiano (CR)
  - coordinates: 45.2250°N 10.2195°E
- Length: 96 km (60 mi)
- Basin size: 1,038 km^{2} (401 sq mi)

Basin features
- Progression: Oglio→ Po→ Adriatic Sea

Mella (known as such also in Italian and in Latin) is a river in Northern Italy, a tributary of Oglio. The largest city the Mella flows through is Brescia. The upper valley of the Mella, upstream from Brescia, is known as Val Trompia.
