= Offlaga =

Offlaga Oflaga
- Comune
- Comune di Offlaga
- Location within Italy Location within Lombardy
- Coordinates: 45°23′N 10°7′E
- Country: Italy
- Region: Lombardy
- Province: Brescia

Area
  - Total: 23.03 km^{2} (8.89 sq mi)

Population (2011)
  - Total: 4,300
  - Density: 190/km^{2} (480/sq mi)
- Time zone: UTC+1 (CET)
  - Summer (DST): UTC+2 (CEST)
- Postal code: 25020
- Dialing code: 030
- Website: Official website

Offlaga (Brescian: Oflaga) is a town and comune in the province of Brescia, in Lombardy.
