= Lumezzane =

Lumezzane Lömedhane
- Comune
- Comune di Lumezzane
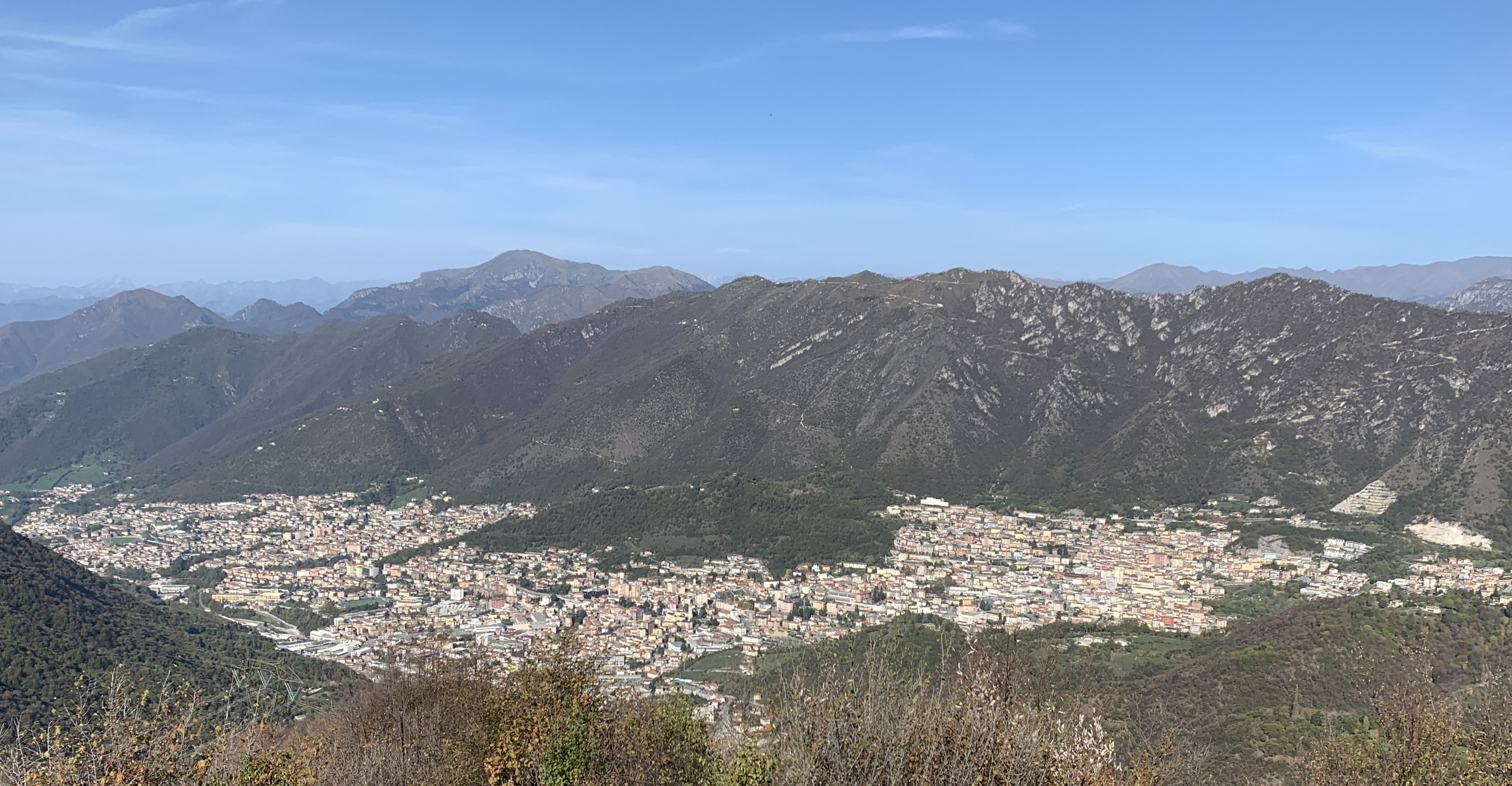
- View of Lumezzane from the surrounding mountains

- Coat of arms

- Location within Italy Location within Lombardy
- Coordinates: 45°39′N 10°16′E
- Country: Italy
- Region: Lombardy
- Province: Brescia (BS)
- Frazioni: Faidana, Fontana, Gazzolo, Gombaiolo, Mezzaluna, Montagnone, Mosniga, Piatucco, Pieve, Premiano, Renzo, San Sebastiano, Sant'Apollonio, Termine, Tufi, Valle, Villaggio Gnutti, Villaggio Gobbi

Government
  - Mayor: Josehf Facchini

Area
  - Total: 31 km^{2} (12 sq mi)
- Elevation: 420 m (1,380 ft)

Population (30 November 2017)
  - Total: 22,255
  - Density: 720/km^{2} (1,900/sq mi)
- Demonym: Lumezzanesi
- Time zone: UTC+1 (CET)
  - Summer (DST): UTC+2 (CEST)
- Postal code: 25065
- Dialing code: 030
- Website: comune.lumezzane.bs.it

Lumezzane (Brescian: Lömezane, locally Lömedhane [lømɛˈðanɛ]) is a town and comune (municipality) in the province of Brescia, in the Italian region of Lombardy. With a population of 22,255 (as of 2017), it is one of the largest towns in its province. It is situated in the Gobbia Valley, which is a side valley of the Trompia Valley.

== Sports ==
The local football club of the comune was F.C. Lumezzane V.G.Z. A.S.D. The club was a merger of A.C. Lumezzane and another local side ValGobbiaZanano in 2018.
