= Monte Spina =

Mountain in Italy

Coordinates: 45°37′03″N 10°15′44″E

Highest point
- Elevation: 962 m (3,156 ft)

Geography
- Location: Lombardy, Italy

Monte Spina is a mountain of Lombardy, Italy. It is 962 metres above sea level.
