= Verolanuova =

Verolanuova Erölanöa (Lombard)
- Comune
- Comune di Verolanuova
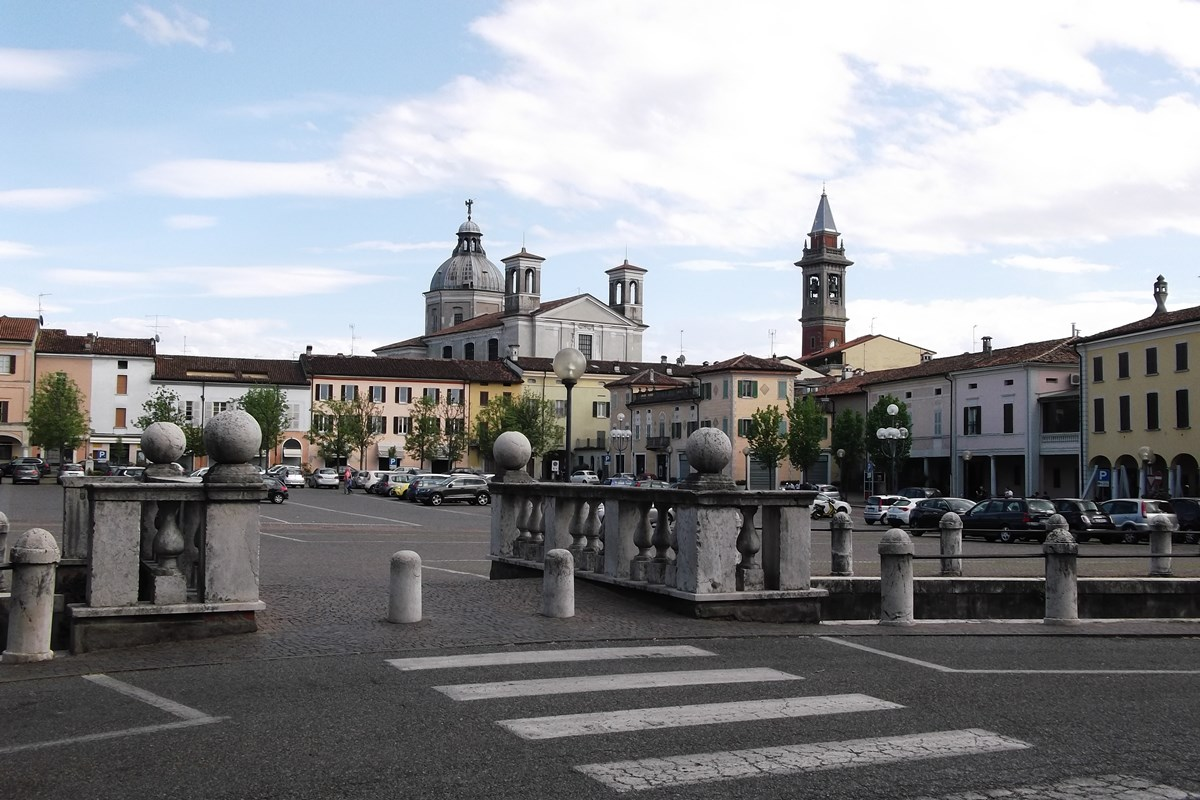
- Liberty squadre, the biggest of the town.

- Coat of arms

- Location within Italy Location within Lombardy
- Coordinates: 45°19′N 10°4′E
- Country: Italy
- Region: Lombardy
- Province: Brescia (BS)
- Frazioni: Breda Libera, Cadignano

Government
  - Mayor: Stefano Dotti (Lega Nord)

Area
  - Total: 24 km^{2} (9.3 sq mi)

Population (2011)
  - Total: 8,190
  - Density: 340/km^{2} (880/sq mi)
- Demonym: Verolesi
- Time zone: UTC+1 (CET)
  - Summer (DST): UTC+2 (CEST)
- Postal code: 25028
- Dialing code: 030
- Patron saint: Saint Lawrence
- Saint day: 10 August
- Website: Official website

Verolanuova (Brescian: Erölanöa) is a comune in the province of Brescia, in Lombardy, northern Italy.

== Transportation ==
Verolanuova has a railway station on the Brescia–Cremona line.

== Notable people ==
- Paola Gambara Costa (1463–1515), Roman Catholic professed religious
