= Tavernole sul Mella =

- Comune
- Comune di Tavernole sul Mella
- Coat of arms

- Location within Italy Location within Lombardy
- Coordinates: 45°45′N 10°14′E
- Country: Italy
- Region: Lombardy
- Province: Brescia (BS)
- Frazioni: Cimmo, Pezzoro

Government
  - Mayor: Andrea Porteri

Area
  - Total: 19 km^{2} (7.3 sq mi)

Population (2011)
  - Total: 1,402
  - Density: 74/km^{2} (190/sq mi)
- Demonym: Tavernolesi
- Time zone: UTC+1 (CET)
  - Summer (DST): UTC+2 (CEST)
- Postal code: 25060
- Dialing code: 030
- ISTAT code: 017183
- Website: Official website

Tavernole sul Mella (Brescian: Taèrnole) is a comune in the province of Brescia, in Lombardy. It is located on the river Mella, in the upper Trompia valley. The main sight is the medieval church of San Filiastro, housing 15th-century paintings.
