= Irma, Lombardy =

Irma
- Comune
- Comune di Irma
- Location within Italy Location within Lombardy
- Coordinates: 45°46′N 10°17′E
- Country: Italy
- Region: Lombardy
- Province: Brescia (BS)

Area
  - Total: 4 km^{2} (1.5 sq mi)

Population (2011)
  - Total: 146
  - Density: 36/km^{2} (95/sq mi)
- Time zone: UTC+1 (CET)
  - Summer (DST): UTC+2 (CEST)
- Postal code: 25061
- Dialing code: 030

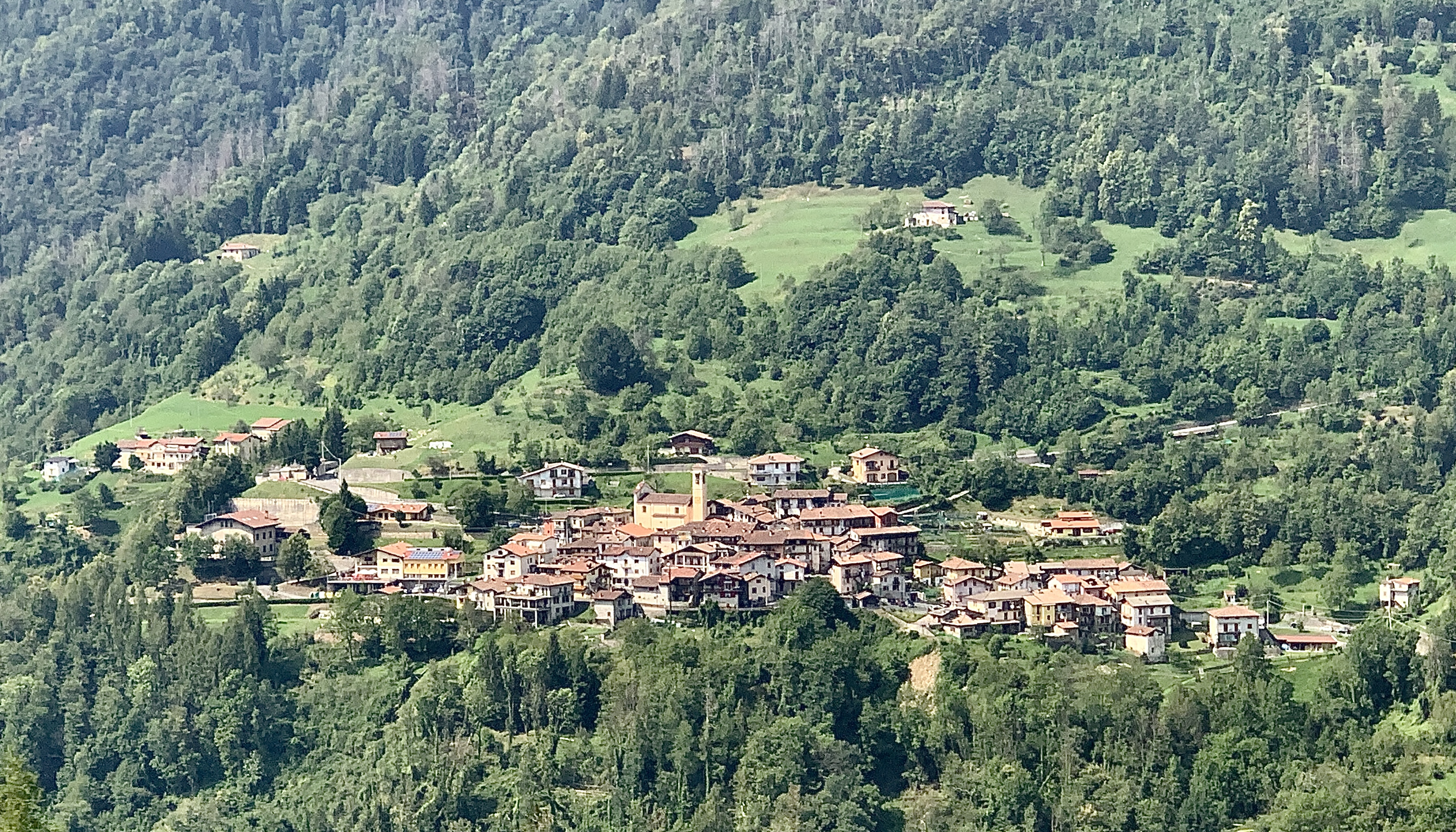
View of Irma from Vaghezza.

Irma (Lombard: Ìrma) is a village and comune in the province of Brescia, in Lombardy.
