= Pertica Bassa =

Pertica Bassa Pèrtega Basa
- Comune
- Comune di Pertica Bassa
- Location within Italy Location within Lombardy
- Coordinates: 45°45′N 10°22′E
- Country: Italy
- Region: Lombardy
- Province: Brescia (BS)
- Frazioni: Forno d'Ono, Ono Degno, Levrange, Avenone

Area
  - Total: 30 km^{2} (12 sq mi)

Population (2011)
  - Total: 704
  - Density: 23/km^{2} (61/sq mi)
- Time zone: UTC+1 (CET)
  - Summer (DST): UTC+2 (CEST)
- Postal code: 25070
- Dialing code: 0365
- Website: Official website

Pertica Bassa (Brescian: Pèrtega Basa) is a village and comune in the province of Brescia, in Lombardy.
