= Val Trompia =

Valley in lombardy, Italy

Coordinates: 45°41′31″N 10°11′11″E

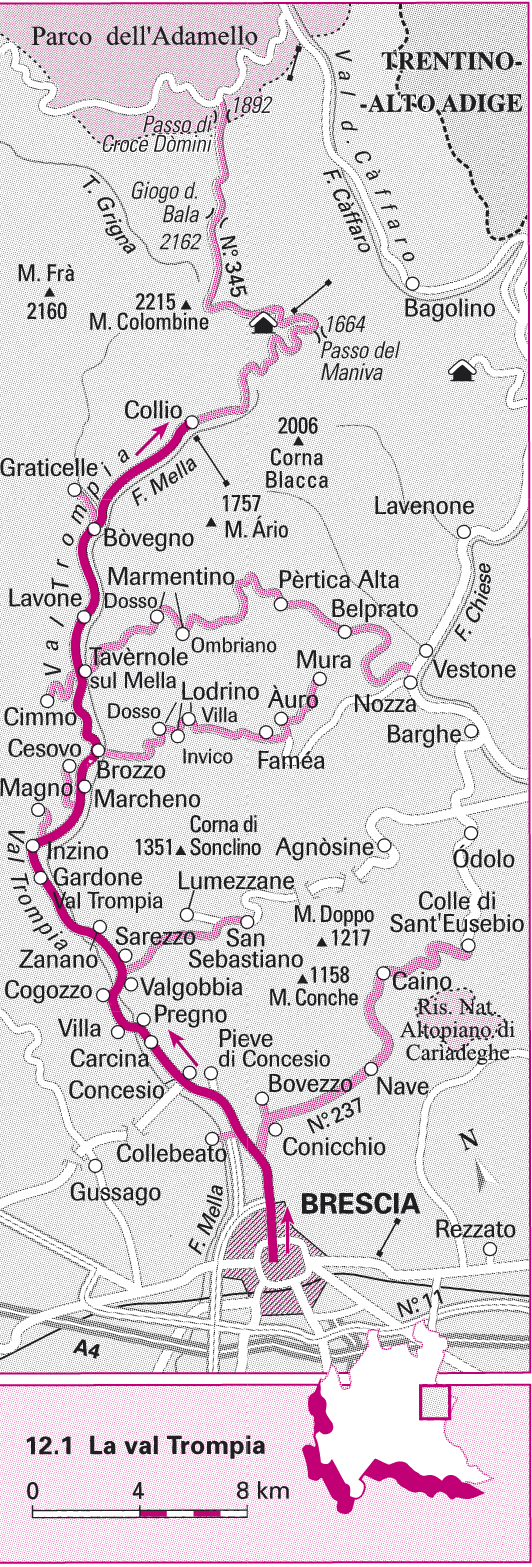
Map of the valley

The Val Trompia (also: Valle Trompia) is a slightly more than 50 km long valley in the Province of Brescia, northern Italy. It consists of the valleys of the river Mella and its tributaries, north of the city of Brescia. It is situated between Val Camonica, Val Sabbia and Lake Iseo.

The name originates from the ancient Rhaetian people, the Trumpilini, the conquest of which by part of the Romans was more difficult than that of Cenomani of Brixia. Trumpilini people was listed as first in the Trophy of Augustus, a Roman monument erected between 25 and 14 BC near La Turbie in honor of Emperor Augustus, who subdued the Alpine tribes.

The presence in the high part of the valley of mineral veins promoted since the antiquity an important mining activity. This encouraged the development of a remarkable iron manufacturing even for the production of weapons. For this reason, under the Venetian domination, the valley was given a special autonomy and a lighter tax regime.

The Val Trompia is known for its suburban sprawl starting north of Brescia. Suburban sprawl continues for more than 20 kilometers northwards although the area is not densely populated.

== Local councils ==
The valley includes the comuni of:

- Bovegno
- Concesio
- Collebeato
- Gardone Val Trompia
- Lodrino
- Marcheno
- Marmentino
- Sarezzo
- Tavernole sul Mella
- Villa Carcina
