= Eastern Lombard dialects =

Lombard dialects of Italy

Eastern Lombard
- Native to: Italy
- Region: Lombardy (Province of Bergamo, Province of Brescia, northern Province of Mantua, northern and central Province of Cremona); Trentino-Alto Adige/Südtirol (western Trentino), Santa Catarina (Vale do Itajaí)
- Native speakers: (undated figure of 2.5 million)
- Language family: Indo-European: Italic; Latino-Faliscan; Romance; Italo-Western; Western Romance; Gallo-Romance; Gallo-Italic; Lombard–Piedmontese?; Lombard; Eastern Lombard

Language codes
- ISO 639-3: –
- Glottolog: east2276 east2278
- Linguasphere: 51-AAA-oda;

Eastern Lombard is a group of closely related variants of Lombard, a Gallo-Italic language spoken in Lombardy, mainly in the provinces of Bergamo, Brescia and Mantua, in the area around Cremona and in parts of Trentino. Its main variants are Bergamasque and Brescian.

In Italian-speaking contexts, Eastern Lombard is often called as dialetti (lit. 'dialects'), understood to mean not a variety of Italian, but a local language that is part of the Romance languages dialect continuum that pre-dates the establishment of Tuscan-based Italian.

Eastern Lombard and Italian have only limited mutual intelligibility, like many other Romance languages spoken in Italy.

Eastern Lombard does not have any official status either in Lombardy or anywhere else: the only official language in Lombardy is Italian.

== Classification ==
Eastern Lombard is a Romance language of the Gallo-Italic branch, linguistically closer to Occitan, Catalan, French, etc. than to Italian, with a Celtic substratum.

== Geographic distribution ==
Eastern Lombard is primarily spoken in Eastern Lombardy (Northern Italy), in the provinces of Bergamo and Brescia, in the Northern region of the province of Mantua and in the area around Crema. The varieties spoken in these regions are generally mutually intelligible for speakers of neighboring areas, but this is not always true for distant peripheral areas. For instance, an inhabitant of the alpine valleys of Bergamo can hardly be understood by a rural inhabitant of the plains of Mantua. Differences include lexical, grammatical and phonetic aspects.

== Phonology ==
The following notes are essentially based on the variety of Eastern Lombard spoken in Brescia. The basic principles are generally valid also for the other varieties but local discrepancies can be found.

Eastern Lombard has 9 vowels and 20 consonants.

=== Consonants ===
Table of consonants
		Labial	Alveolar	Postalveolar / Palatal	Velar
Nasal		m	n	ɲ	
Plosive and Affricate	voiceless	p	t	t͡ʃ	k
Plosive and Affricate	voiced	b	d	d͡ʒ	ɡ
Fricative	voiceless	f	s	(ʃ)	
Fricative	voiced	v	z		
Trill			r		
Approximant	median	w		j	
Approximant	lateral		l	(ʎ)	

The voiced consonants /b/, /d/, /ɡ/, /v/, /z/, /dʒ/ never occur at the end of a word. This phenomenon, common to other languages (including German, Catalan, Dutch, Turkish and Russian), is called final devoicing. The phoneme /ʃ/ only occurs in loanwords, often borrowings from Italian. For example, scià, "to ski" (from Italian sciare) is pronounced /ʃiˈa/. The phoneme /tʃ/ is pronounced [j] before a consonant. This never occurs inside a word as the segment /tʃ/ + consonant does not exist in Eastern Lombard. However, it does occur when /tʃ/ appears word-finally preceding another word which begins with a consonant. For example:

- I è nacc vià [i ɛ ˌnaj ˈvja] = "they have gone away" vs
  i è nacc a spas [i ɛ ˌnatʃ a ˈspas] = "they have gone for a leisurely walk"

- Töcc du [tøj ˈdu] = "both", "each of the two" vs
  töcc öndes [tøtʃ ˈøndes] = "all of the eleven"

The approximants /j/ and /w/ are distinct phonemes from the vocalic sounds /i/, /u/. This can be seen in the following examples:

- /kwat/ = "how much" vs /kuˈat/ = "brooded"
- /pjat/ = "dish" vs /piˈat/ = "bitten"

Locally, the alveolar fricative [s] is replaced by the glottal fricative [h]. This mainly happens in the prealpine valleys of the provinces of Bergamo and Brescia; (Note: "The sound change *s > h which appears to be an innovation of Eastern Lombard has diffusional characteristics. It is not attested in the towns of Brescia and Bergamo. In the province of Brescia, it is attested in most of the upper low, and low Val Camonica, on the banks of Lake Iseo, in Franciacorta, in Val Trompia (with the exception of Collio), in Val Sabbia, and along the banks of Lake Idro. In the province of Bergamo, it is attested in low Val Brembana, in low Val Seriana, in Val Borlezza, in the areas around Bergamo, in the eastern plain, in Val Cavallina, and in Val Calepio (G. Bonfadini, personal communication, August 4, 2013).") thus Brèssa ("Brescia") is pronounced [ˈbrɛhɔ] instead of [ˈbrɛsɔ]. However, even in areas where this phenomenon is the rule, there are some interesting exceptions to take in account. Words like grassie ("thanks") are never pronounced [ˈɡrahje]. At present, the most common pronunciation is [ˈɡrasje] but a more genuine outcome (and often preferred by aged people) would be [ˈɡrahtʃe].

Other examples for this feature:

- Licensià ("to dismiss, to fire") = [litʃenˈsja] / [lehenˈtʃa]
- Cristià ("Christian") = [krisˈtja] / [krihˈtʃa]
- Pasiù ("passion") = [paˈsju] / [pahˈtʃu]

=== Assimilation ===
Regressive assimilation at word boundaries is common in Eastern Lombard. Assimilation can be either complete or partial. Complete assimilation occurs when two occlusive sounds fall in contact. In this case the first occlusive is completely absorbed by the second and the resulting sound has all the features of the second consonant but is notably lengthened. For example:

- el ga fat pàla = [ɛl ɡa fa‿ˈpːalɔ]
- l'è tròp calt ("it's too hot") = [ˌlɛ trɔ‿ˈkːalt]
- el gat bianc ("the white cat") = [el ɡa‿ˈbːjaŋk]

The same phenomenon occurs when an occlusive consonant precedes a nasal or a liquid consonant. For example:

- en gat négher ("a black cat") = [ɛŋ ɡa‿ˈnːeɡɛr]
- l'è tròp mis = [ˌlɛ trɔ‿ˈmːis]
- so ché strac mórt ("I'm dead tired")= [so ˌke stra‿ˈmːort]

Complete assimilation can also occur when an occlusive precedes a fricative. For example: l'è nit vért = [ˌlɛ ni‿ˈvːert].

When a sequence of nasal+occlusive falls in contact with another occlusive or a fricative, the first occlusive is completely elided and the nasal undergoes partial assimilation. In this case no lengthening occurs. For example:

- el ga 'l sanch blö ("he's got blue blood")= [ɛlˌɡal sam‿ˈblø]
- l'è lonc fés = [ˌlɛ loɱ‿ˈfes]

But when an occlusive precedes /z/, assimilation involves both consonants and the result is an affricate sound:

- l'è nit zó ècc = [lɛ ˌni‿dːzo ˈɛtʃ]
- l'è tròp zalt ("it's too yellow") = [ˌlɛtrɔ‿ˈdːzalt]

The phoneme /n/ can undergo assimilation in place of articulation with a following consonant. Thus, the /n/ in /nk/ and /nɡ/ is a velar [ŋ], the /n/ in /nv/ and /nf/ is a labiodental [ɱ]. Within a word, the phoneme /n/ is never transcribed before /p/ and /b/, where /m/ is written instead. Nasal assimilation, including /n/ to /m/, also takes place across word boundaries. For example:

- en ca ("a dog") = [ɛŋ‿ˈka]
- vàghen fò ("hurry up") = [ˌvaɡeɱ‿ˈfɔ]
- l'an pasàt ("last year") = [ˌlam‿paˈsat]

=== Vowels ===
Eastern Lombard has 9 vocalic sounds:

IPA	Example	Italian	English
i	sich /sik/	cinque	five
e	sét /set/	sete	thirst
ɛ	sèch /sɛk/	secco	dry, arid
a	sach /sak/	sacco	sack, bag
o	ciót /tʃot/	chiodo	nail
ɔ	sòch /sɔk/	ciocco	stump
ø	söt /søt/	asciutto	dry
y	mür /myr/	muro	wall
u	mur /mur/	gelso	mulberry

Only three vocalic phonemes occur in unstressed final syllables: /a/ in open syllables only, and /o/ and /e/ in both open and closed syllables. Other vowels can occur in final syllables in loanwords.

Locally, the phoneme /a/ is pronounced [ɔ] when it appears as last sound of the word in an unstressed syllable (actually slightly more close than cardinal [ɔ]). For example:

- lüna ("moon") = [ˈlynɔ]
- setemana ("week") = [sɛtɛˈmanɔ]

=== Unstressed vowel system reduction and local variability ===
Some vowel contrasts are eliminated in unstressed syllables. For example, in the urban Brescian variety, [ɔ] and [o] no longer contrast. Thus, the word robà ("to steal") can be pronounced both [roˈba] and [rɔˈba], with almost no difference noticed by speakers. In addition, a further variant [ruˈba] is also possible, though in this case, a difference is noticed by speakers but it is considered a local variant and no loss of intelligibility results. The sounds [e] and [ɛ] also no longer contrast in unstressed syllables, and therefore the word vedèl ("calf") can be pronounced [veˈdɛl] or [vɛˈdɛl]. However, when affected by vowel harmony (see below), the unstressed sounds [e]/[ɛ], [o]/[ɔ], and [ø] become [i], [u], and [y] respectively.

In conclusion, it is possible to say that only five contrastive vowel qualities are found in unstressed syllables: [o]/[ɔ]/[(u)], [ø]/[(y)], [a], [e]/[ɛ], [i] (but with the [i] not completely separated from [e]/[ɛ]). Some examples:

- molà ("to let go, to release") [moˈla]
- mölà ("to grind") [møˈla]
- malàt ("sick, ill") [maˈlat]
- pelàt ("bald") [peˈlat]
- Milà ("Milan") [miˈla]

The situation can differ for other Eastern Lombard varieties, however, and the rules of the unstressed vowel system vary according to the area. For example, in Franciacorta, a province of Brescia, the sounds [o] and [ø] are regularly replaced by [u] and [y] in pretonic position:

- mulà instead of molà
- Ruàt ("Rovato") instead of Roàt
- Üspedalèt ("Ospitaletto") instead of Öspedalèt

Since in unstressed position these vocalic sounds are not contrastive, these local variants do not compromise reciprocal intelligibility.

=== Vowel harmony ===
Certain varieties of Eastern Lombard (mostly in Brescian area) exhibit a process of regressive vowel harmony involving the feature of vowel height. When the stress falls on a close vowel (/i/ or /u/) the preceding vowels shift their height, becoming close as well (/ɛ/ and /e/ become [i], while /ɔ/ and /o/ become [u]). The vowel /a/ is not affected by this process and acts as opaque vowel blocking the harmonization process. In Camuno, harmonization occurs almost only where the stressed vowel is an /i/ and not where it is an /u/.

This phenomenon affects all the words independent of the word's function.

Because the diminutive and augmentative are formed with the suffixes -ì and -ù (feminine -ìna and -ùna) respectively, this process is easily observable in nouns:

- cortèl ("knife")
  - curtilì ("small knife")
  - curtilù ("big knife")

As already mentioned, the vowel /a/ acts as opaque vowel which blocks the harmonization process:

- fontàna ("fountain")
  - fontanì ("small fountain"), not funtanì
- öspedàl ("hospital")
  - öspedalì ("small hospital"), not üspidalì

But vowels that occur after the /a/ and before the stressed vowel are still affected:

- mortadèla ("mortadella")
  - mortadilìna ("small mortadella")

In these cases variants like funtanì and üspedalì (but not üspidalì) or murtadilìna are accepted (or locally preferred) but fall under the normal unstressed vowel variability.

Verbs are affected by this process in their conjugation, when the inflection contains a stressed /i/ (there are no verbal suffixes containing a stressed /u/). For example:

- öler ("to want")
  - öle ("I want")
  - ülìt ("wanted", past participle)
  - ülìf ("you want", second person plural)
  - ülìef ("you wanted", second person plural imperfect indicative)

Adjectives formed with the suffix -ùs (feminine -ùza) also exhibit this rule:

- póra ("fear")
  - purús, purúza ("fearful person")

== Orthography ==
Since Eastern Lombard is still principally an oral language, a commonly accepted orthography has not been established. While in recent years there has been an increasing production of texts (mainly light comedies and poem collections), each author continues to follow their own spelling rules. The most problematic and controversial issues seem to be the representation of intervocalic /s/ and /z/ (rendered by different authors with ⟨-ss-⟩, ⟨-s-⟩ or ⟨-z-⟩) and final /tʃ/ vs. /k/ (rendered with ⟨-cc⟩, ⟨-c⟩ or ⟨-ch⟩).

This article follows the rules of the Italian orthography, with the following exceptions.

=== Vowels ===
Diacritic marks are utilized for vowel sounds to distinguish /e/ from /ɛ/ and /o/ from /ɔ/ in stressed syllables. Furthermore, the umlaut is adopted to represent the rounded vowels /ø/ and /y/:

Letter	Phoneme
a	/a/
é	/e/
è	/ɛ/
i	/i/
ó	/o/
ò	/ɔ/
u	/u/
ü	/y/
ö	/ø/

Note that grave and acute accents are also used to indicate the stressed syllable in non-monosyllabic words. Since unstressed vowels are less distinctive, it is not necessary to discriminate the open/close quality.

=== Consonants ===
The digraph ⟨-cc⟩ is used at the end of the word to represent the sound /tʃ/ (in other positions this sound is rendered by means of the usual Italian orthography rules: ⟨c⟩ before front vowels and ⟨ci⟩ before non-front vowels).

A consonant sequence that is peculiar to Lombard is that of a voiceless alveolar fricative followed by a voiceless postalveolar affricate, [stʃ]. This article adopts the convention of representing this sound as ⟨s·c⟩, although other texts may follow different traditions (so the same sequence can also be spelled ⟨s'c⟩ or ⟨s-c⟩ or even the ambiguous ⟨sc⟩; some authors use ⟨scc⟩). This sequence, which is absent in Italian, can occur at the beginning of word, as in s·cèt ("son, boy") /stʃɛt/; in the middle, as in brös·cia ("brush") /ˈbrøstʃa/; or at the end, as in giös·cc ("right, correct", plural) /ˈdʒøstʃ/.

The sequence /zdʒ/ is also present in Eastern Lombard and is represented in this article with the sequence of signs ⟨-sgi-⟩, for example:

- bàsgia ("large bowl") = /ˈbazdʒa/
- sgionfà ("to inflate") = /zdʒonˈfa/

== Grammar ==
The grammatical system of Eastern Lombard is similar to other those of other Romance languages. The word order is SVO (subject–verb–object) and it has a moderate inflection system: verbs are declined for mood, tense and aspect and agree with their subject in person and number. Nouns are classified as either masculine or feminine and can be marked as singular or plural. Adjectives and pronouns agree with any nouns they modify in gender and number. Eastern Lombard also prefers prepositions over case marking.

== Literature ==
The oldest known text written in Eastern Lombard consists of fragments of a laud known as Mayor gremeza il mund no pothevela ancor aver, a manuscript found in Bovegno (Trompia valley), and dating from the fourteenth century. Today, literary production has increased in volume and mainly consists in light comedies and poem collections (Angelo Canossi is an example for poetry in the Brescian dialect).

== Examples ==
The following tale is in Brescian:

=== La mèrla ===
I mèrli 'na ólta i ghìa le pène biànche, ma chèl envéren lé l'éra stàt en bèl envéren e lé, la mèrla, la gà dìt: "Zenér de la màla gràpa, per tò despèt gó i uzilì 'ndela gnàta." A lü, 'l Zenér, gh'è nìt adòs 'n pó de ràbia, e 'l gà dìt: "Spèta, mèrla, che te la faró mé adès a té, e se te sét biànca mé te faró ègner négra." E pò dòpo 'l gà dit amò: "Dù ghe i ó e giü 'n prèstet el töaró e se te sét biànca, mé te faró ní négra." E alùra 'l gà fàt nì fò 'n frèt che se n'ìa mài vést giü compàgn.

Lé la mèrla la saìa piö che fà cói sò uzilì ndèla gnàta, e isé l'è nàda a rifügiàs endèla càpa del camì; dré al camì va sö 'l föm e lùr i uzilì i è déentàcc töcc négher, e quànche i è nicc fò de là, la mèrla la gh'ìa mìa piö le pène biànche, ma la ghe i éra négre. Alùra Zenér, töt sudisfàt, el gà dìt: "Tò mèrla, che te l'ó fàda mé staólta: se te se stàda biànca mé t'ó fàt ní négra e isé te làset lé de seghetà a tiràm en gìr."

=== Phonetic transcription ===
[i ˈmɛrli na ˈoltɔ i ˈɡiɔ le ˌpɛne ˈbjaŋke | ma ˌkɛl ɛɱˌverɛn ˈle lerɔ ˌstat ɛm ˈbɛl ɛɱˌverɛn ɛ ˌle | la ˈmɛrlɔ | la ɡa ˈditː | zeˈner de la ˌmalɔ ˈɡrapɔ | ˌper tɔ deˈspɛt ˌɡo j uziˈli ˌndelɔ ˈɲatɔ | aˈly | lzeˈner | ˌɡɛ nit aˈdɔs em ˌpo de ˈrabja | ˌɛ lː ɡa ˈdit | ˈspɛtɔ | ˌmɛrlɔ | kɛ tɛ la faˌro ˈme aˌdɛs a ˈte | ɛ sɛ tɛ ˌse ˈbːjaŋkɔ ˌme tɛ faro ˌɛɲɛr ˈneɡrɔ | ɛ pɔ ˈdɔpo l ɡaˌdit aˌmɔ | ˌdu ɡɛ ˈj o ɛ dʒy m ˌprɛstet ɛl tøaˈro ɛ sɛ tɛ ˌse ˈbːjaŋkɔ | ˌme tɛ faˌro ni ˈneɡrɔ | ɛ aˈlurɔ l ɡa ˌfa nːi ˌfɔ ɱ ˈfrɛt kɛ sɛ ˌnia mai ˌvez dʒy komˈpaɲ]

[ˌle la ˈmɛrlɔ la saˌiɔ pjø ke ˈfa koj ˌsɔ uziˌli ndɛlɔ ˈɲatɔ | ɛ iˈse ˌlɛ nadɔ ˌa rifyˈdʒas ɛnˌdɛlɔ ˌkapɔ dɛl kaˈmi | ˌdre al kaˈmi va sø l ˈføm ɛ ˈlur j uziˈli j ɛ deɛnˈtaj ˌtøj ˈneɡɛr | e ˌkwaŋ kɛ j ɛ ˌnij fɔ de ˈla | la ˈmɛrlɔ la ˌɡiɔ miɔ ˌpjø le ˌpɛne ˈbjaŋke | ma la ɡɛ ˌj erɔ ˈneɡre | aˈlurɔ zeˈner | tø sːudisˈfat | el ɡa ˈdit | ˈtɔ ˌmɛrlɔ | kɛ tɛ lo ˌfadɔ ˈme staˌoltɔ | sɛ tɛ se ˌstadɔ ˈbjaŋkɔ ˌme to fa ˌnːi ˈneɡrɔ ɛ iˈse tɛ lasɛ ˈlːe dɛ seɡeˈta a tiˌram en ˈdʒir]

=== The she-blackbird ===
Once upon a time blackbirds had white feathers, but in that time winter had been mild and a she-blackbird scorned January saying: "Bad-headed January, in spite of you I have got a brood in my nest." Hearing this, January got angry and he said: "Just wait a bit, you she-blackbird, I will fool you and I will turn you from white into black." Then he said: "I have got two, and I will borrow one, and I will turn you from white to black." And he brought forth a cold as there had never been before.

The she-blackbird did not know how to cope with her brood in the nest, so she sheltered in the hood of a chimney, and the smoke turned all the birds black; so when they came out the blackbirds did not have white feathers anymore, but black ones. And January, very happy, said: "This time it was me that fooled you, blackbird: you were white and I turned you black, this will teach you to stop teasing me."

== See also ==
- Bergamasque
- Cremish dialect
- Lombard languages
- Western Lombard
