= Franciacorta (wine) =

Italian sparkling wine

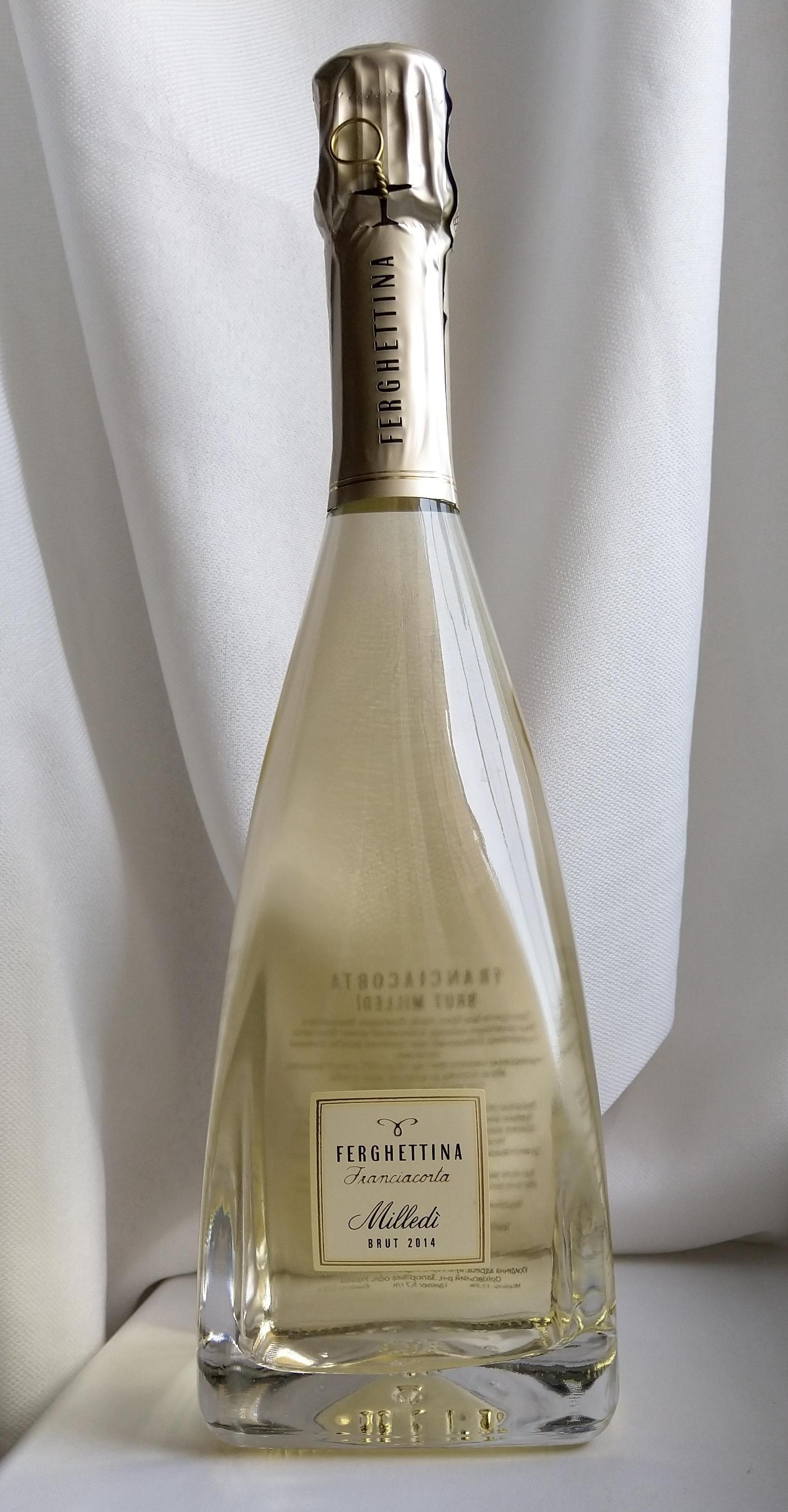
A bottle of Ferghettina Franciacorta

Franciacorta (Italian pronunciation: [frantʃaˈkorta]) is a sparkling wine from the Italian province of Brescia (Lombardy) with DOCG status. It is produced using the traditional method from grapes grown within the boundaries of the territory of Franciacorta, on the hills located between the southern shore of Lake Iseo and the city of Brescia. It was awarded DOC status in 1967, the designation then also including red and white still wines. Since 1995 the DOCG classification has applied exclusively to the sparkling wines of the area.

== History ==
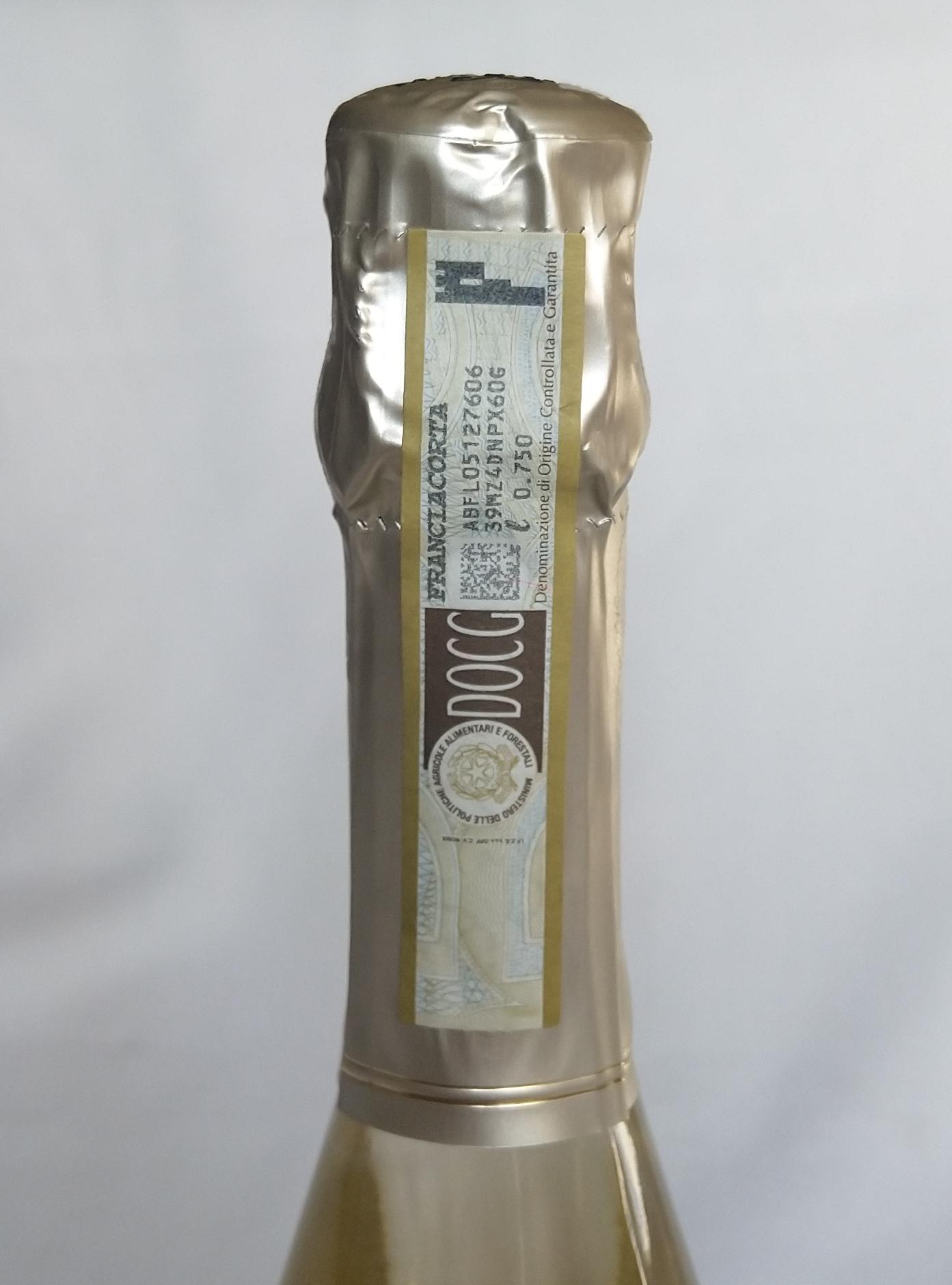
The Franciacorta DOCG tax seal

The still wines from this area have ancient traditions, referred to by Virgil and Pliny the Elder, and documented in Brescia City council books as "Franzacurta" as far back as in 1277. The name may derive from the tax-exempt (francae) status of the region's towns (curtes) in the Middle Ages. The wines were not called Franciacorta until 1957, when Guido Berlucchi released a white wine named Pinot di Franciacorta. An ambitious young winemaker working for Berlucchi, Franco Ziliani, was permitted to pursue an aspiration of producing a fine sparkling wine, and in 1961 was allowed to produce for release 3,000 bottles of Pinot di Franciacorta. Instant interest allowed the following vintage production to be set at 20,000 bottles, and eventually the annual production was 100,000 bottles. The national prominence that followed was soon exploited by several entrepreneurs from Milan and Brescia, and by the time the region was granted DOC status in 1967 there were 11 producers of sparkling Franciacorta, although Berlucchi represented more than 80% of the production.

With its directives, Franciacorta became the first DOC to specify that its sparkling wines must be made by traditional method. In 1990, the Consorzio per la tutela del Franciacorta was formed, instigating codes of self-regulation with a gradual reduction of yields and elimination of the use of Pinot grigio, becoming the body considered responsible for the efficient elevation of sparkling Franciacorta to DOCG status in 1995. Since August 1, 2003, Franciacorta has been the only Italian wine not obliged to declare its DOCG appellation on the label, in the same manner that a Champagne is permitted to exclude from labels its AOC.

From 1996 to 2006, sales of Franciacorta grew from 2.9 million to 6.7 million bottles. According to Tom Stevenson, the Franciacorta region is "the only compact wine area producing world class sparkling wine in Italy".

== Conditions and regulations ==
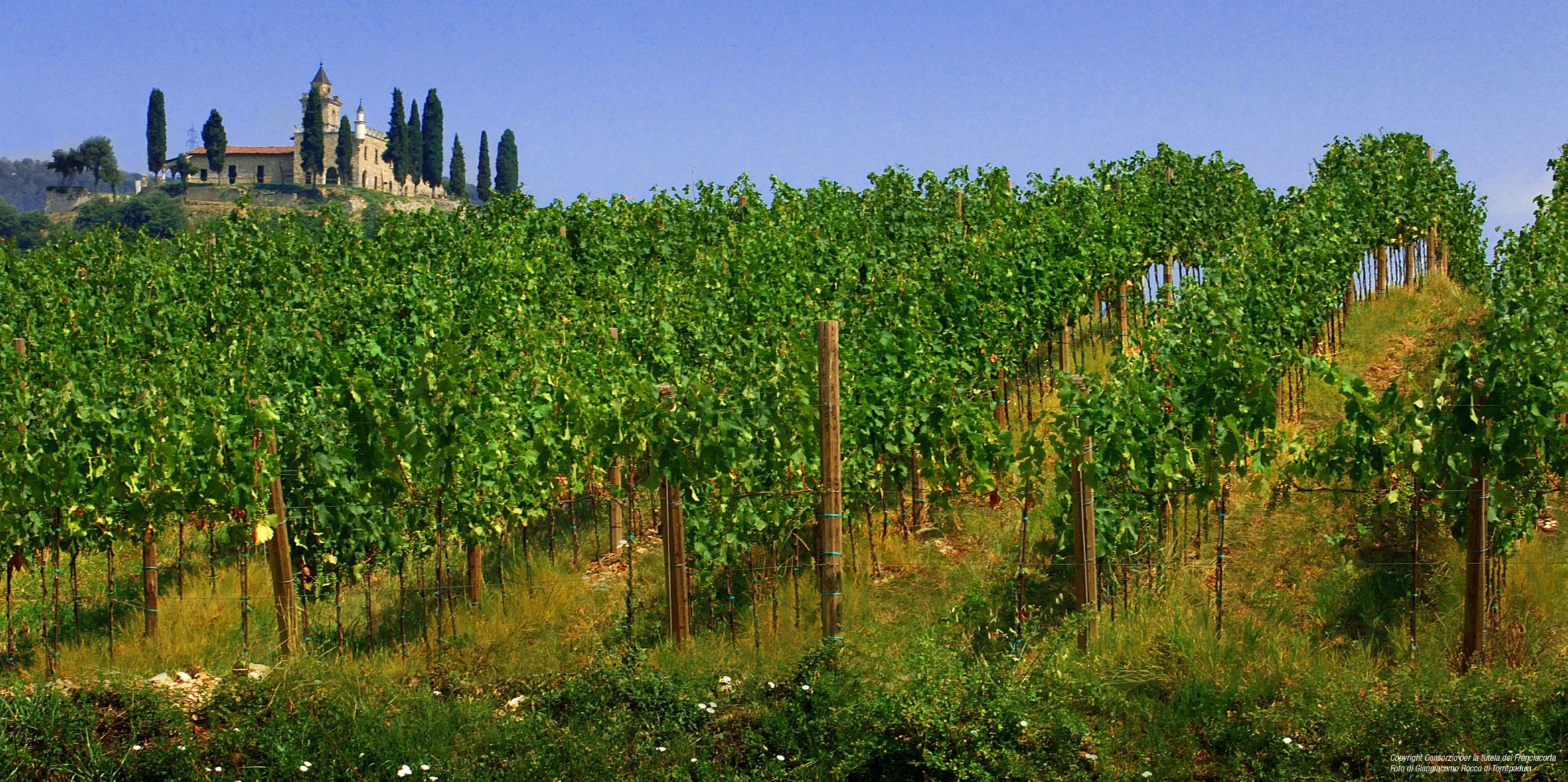
Vineyard in Franciacorta

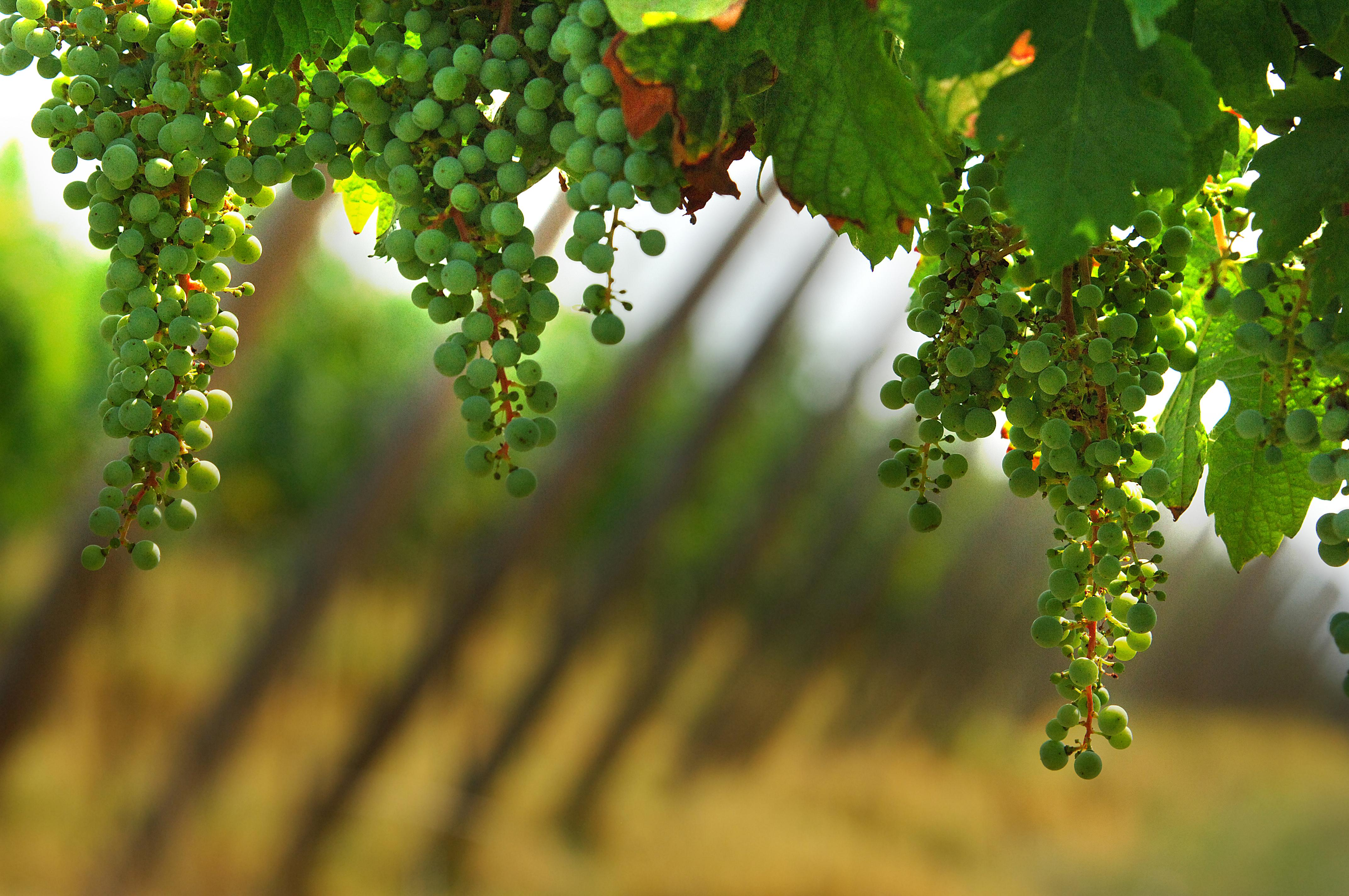
Chardonnay grapes in Franciacorta

Grapes for Franciacorta are grown in strictly delimited vineyards in the communes of Adro, Capriolo, Cazzago San Martino, Cellatica, Coccaglio, Cologne, Corte Franca, Erbusco, Gussago, Iseo, Monticelli Brusati, Ome, Paderno Franciacorta, Paratico, Passirano, Provaglio d'Iseo, Rodengo-Saiano, Rovato and Brescia, with soil conditions described as mineral-rich, granular-sized, calcareous gravel and sandy morainal soils that cover a limestone bedrock.

The DOCG declared vineyards extend 2,200 hectares (5,400 acres) and the distribution of permitted grape varieties are 85% Chardonnay, 10% Pinot nero and 5% Pinot bianco.

Nonvintage Franciacorta (NV) may not be released until at least 25 months after harvest, of which 18 months must be in contact with the yeast in the bottle (compared to 12 months minimum for Champagne, although many producers choose to age far longer). Franciacorta Vintage or Millesimato may not be sold until at least 37 months after harvest, of which 30 months must be in contact with the yeast (similar to Champagne). A Franciacorta rosé must contain at least 35% Pinot nero, and may be made by blending red wine. Franciacorta Satèn must be a Blanc de blancs with only the use of Chardonnay and/or Pinot bianco permitted, with only 5 atmospheres of pressure instead of 6.

The designations for dosage are exactly as those of Champagne: Pas dosé, or Dosage zéro, Pas opéré, or nature: maximum 2 g/L of residual sugar; Extra brut: 6 g/L; Brut: 12 g/L; Extra dry: 12–17 g/L; Sec: 17–35 g/L; Demi-sec: 35–50 g/L.

== Curtefranca ==
With the creation of the DOCG Franciacorta, the former DOC was renamed Terre di Franciacorta for the still wines and then in 2008, it took the name of Curtefranca. The renaming was a legal requirement to avoid confusion between the DOC still wines and the DOCG sparkling wines. The still wines are made in two types: a Burgundy-style Bianco based either on Chardonnay or Pinot bianco or a blend of both, and a Bordeaux-style Rosso based on either Cabernet Franc or Cabernet Sauvignon or both, and Merlot, with smaller amounts of Nebbiolo and Barbera. Pinot noir is permitted only in the DOCG sparkling wines, with no option of a Burgundian-style still red wine under the DOC rules.

== Marketing ==
In 2012, Franciacorta was selected as the official sparkling wine of Milan Fashion Week.

== See also ==
- Champagne
- Prosecco
