= Franciacorta (region) =

Geographic region in Italy

Coordinates: 45.6200°N 10.0200°E

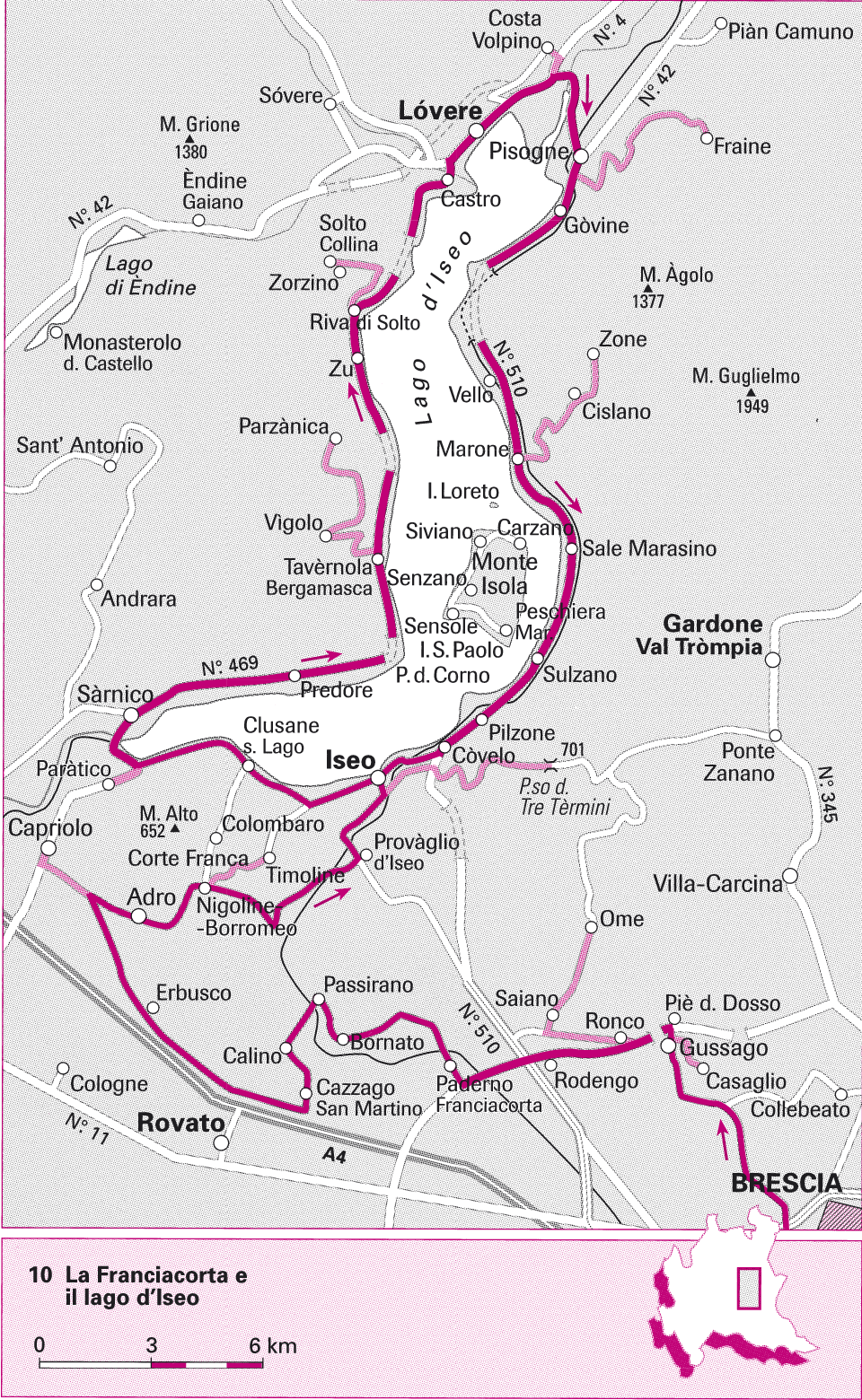
Map of the Franciacorta and Lake Iseo

Franciacorta (Italian pronunciation: [frantʃaˈkorta]) is a historical region in the Province of Brescia, Lombardy, Italy, with a population of around 158,249. It is known for its wine production and includes world-famous producers such as Berlucchi, Bellavista and Ca' del Bosco. The name Franciacorta appears for the first time in 1277. It derives from the Italian “corti franche,” which were medieval villages exempt from tax or levies.

== Geography and climate ==
Franciacorta extends from Mount Orfano (height: 451 m) in the southwest area to the shores of Lake Iseo in the north, and from the river Oglio in the western border to the city of Brescia in the eastern one. The physical conformation characterised by rolling hills was shaped by glacial action. The soil, composed of glacial moraines consisting of gravel and sand over limestone, is ideal for the cultivation of grapes and winemaking. The weather is mild and constant due to its location in the southern foothills of the Alps and the tempering presence of large lakes.

The Franciacorta territory extends on the surface of the following municipalities all located in the province of Brescia: Adro, Capriolo, Cazzago San Martino, Cellatica, Coccaglio, Cologne, Corte Franca, Erbusco, Gussago, Iseo, Monticelli Brusati, Ome, Paderno Franciacorta, Paratico, Passirano, Provaglio d'Iseo, Rodengo-Saiano and Rovato. The area, mostly hilly and once strewn with woods, has recently been transformed by the planting of many vineyards. The local authorities are committed to safeguarding the landscape and conserving it both from the physical side and from the historical and cultural points of view. In fact, there are numerous architectural ancient testimonies such as monasteries, churches, abbeys, villas and castles of the Middle Ages. Rodengo is home to a Cluniac foundation, the Abbey of St. Nicholas, which has been inhabited by Olivetan monks since 1446. Other places of interest are the castle of Passirano and the Romanesque church of Provaglio d'Iseo.

== History ==
The area has been inhabited since Palaeolithic times with archaeological records left by Gauls— the Cenomani of Brixia (modern Brescia), Romans and Lombards. The name Franciacorta, appears for the first time in 1277. It derives from the Italian “corti franche,” which were medieval villages exempt from tax or levies.

The Franciacorta racetrack opened in 2006 and has hosted the World RX of Italy and the NASCAR Whelen Euro Series.

== Land use ==
=== Ancient viticulture ===
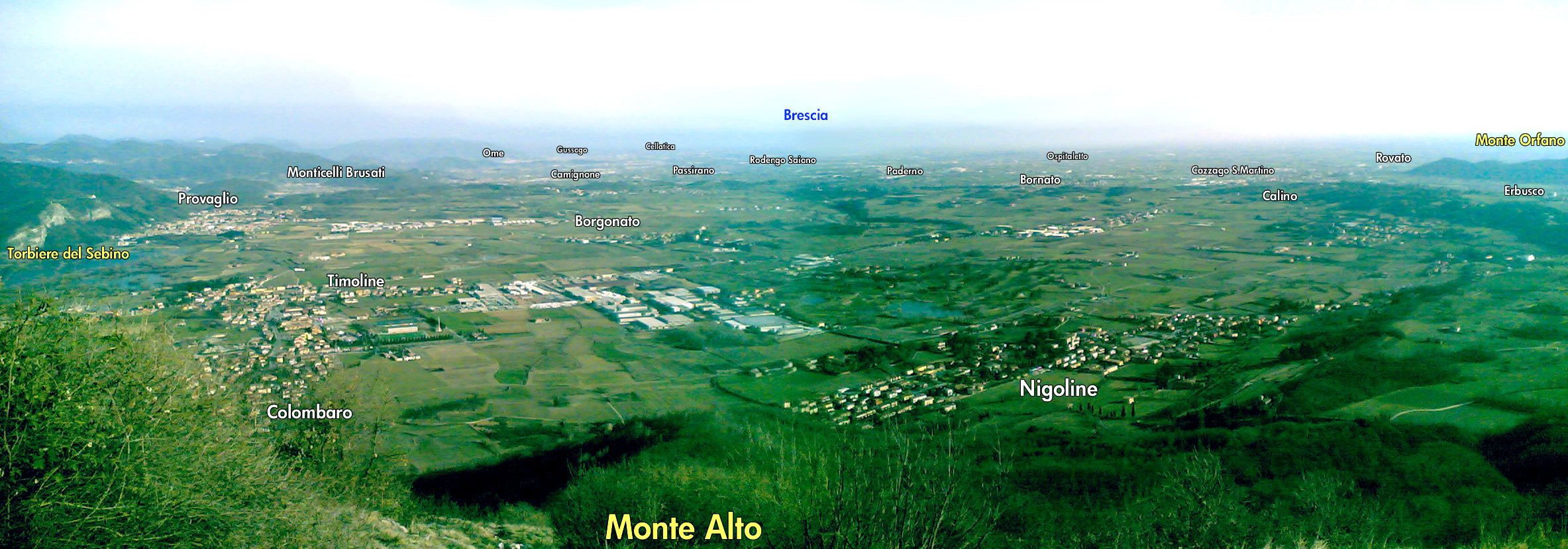
Panoramic view of Franciacorta from Monte Alto

The vineyards of Franciacorta were planted in ancient times, as witnessed by the grape seeds from prehistoric times and the archaeological material found throughout the territory. There are also other testimonies of classical authors such as Plinio and Columella a Virgilio. Through historiographical evidences, it is possible to trace the passage of different peoples: the Cenomani Gauls, the Romans and the Lombards. The most abundant material is the Roman one and consists mainly of commemorative funeral inscriptions and military stones. Also, some places' names and localities' names, such as Cazzago and Gussago, come from Roman courtesy.

The most valuable archaeological resource is the temple architrave (from Erbusco) which was brought to Brescia and then walled in the facade of the palace of Monte di Pietà della Loggia.

=== Modern viticulture ===
Despite boasting a long history, the new course of viticulture of Franciacorta began in all respects at the beginning of the 1960s with the birth of the first wineries. At the end of the 1970s, Italian oenology experienced a period of great ferment and in Franciacorta, several entrepreneurs invested and focused on the cultivation of vineyards. In fact, even today many wineries that produce Franciacorta have been founded by entrepreneurs from Brescia and the province. Afterwards, the growth has been very fast until today's Franciacorta fame, a national point of reference for the wine's production with the classic method.

The production and marketing of bubbles has become increasingly important in the last twenty years, to boast the DOCG brand and be known in the wine world for the high quality achieved. The name "Franciacorta" has over time become synonymous with the same DOCG sparkling wine produced in the many vineyards of the area.

Since July 2008, with the publication of the new specification, the name of the DOC "Terre di Franciacorta", used for red and white still wines, has been replaced with Curtefranca.

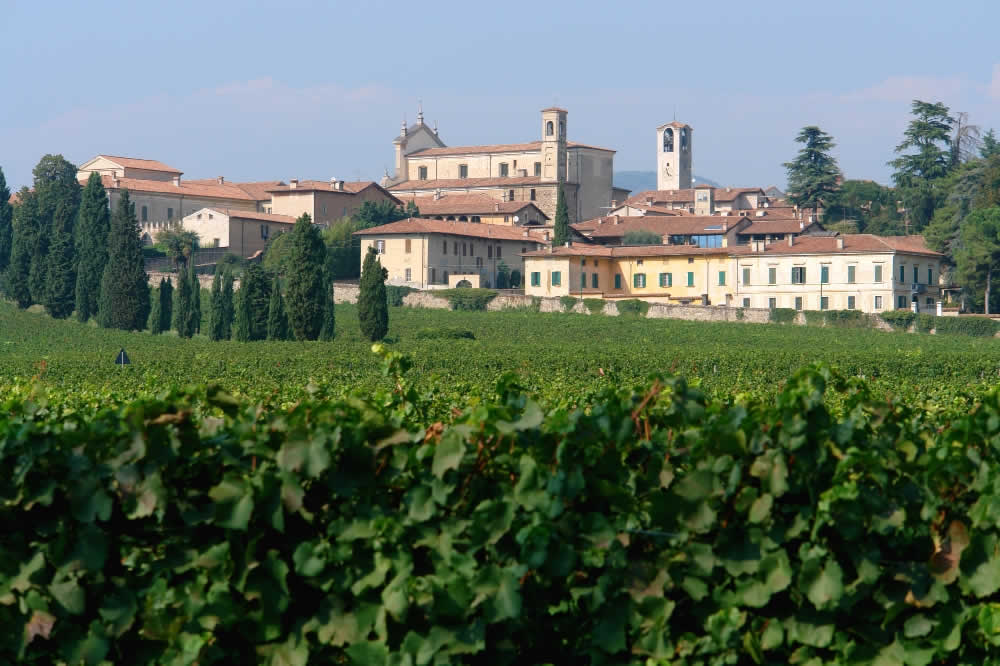
Franciacorta vineyard in Erbusco

Today the area is just over two thousand hectares. Its increase pace, which was considerable in the first decade of the 2000s, has now slowed sharply partly because of the global crisis. In fact, no further major growth developments are expected in the coming years. The slowdown is also due to some choices of the consortium Franciacorta aimed at not creating an excess of supply in order to safeguard the producers currently present on the territory.

In 1995 Franciacorta was assigned the first refermented in Italian bottle with the denomination DOCG. This is obtained from Chardonnay and/or Pinot Noir and/or Pinot Blanc grapes and is produced in three types: Franciacorta, Franciacorta Satèn and Franciacorta Rosé. In addition to these, Millesimato and Riserva, which require longer ageing, are also produced. Franciacorta has also two other DOC denominations: a white wine and a red wine.

There are over one hundred wineries, some of which are located in buildings of artistic and architectural interest. Most of them are open to the public, so the visitor can learn about the methods of wine production, participate in tastings and buy the product.

To promote enotourism, the district established the "Strada del Vino Franciacorta" on the model of the famed German Wine Route (Weinstraße) in 2001.
