= Castegnato =

Castegnato Castegnàt
- Comune
- Comune di Castegnato
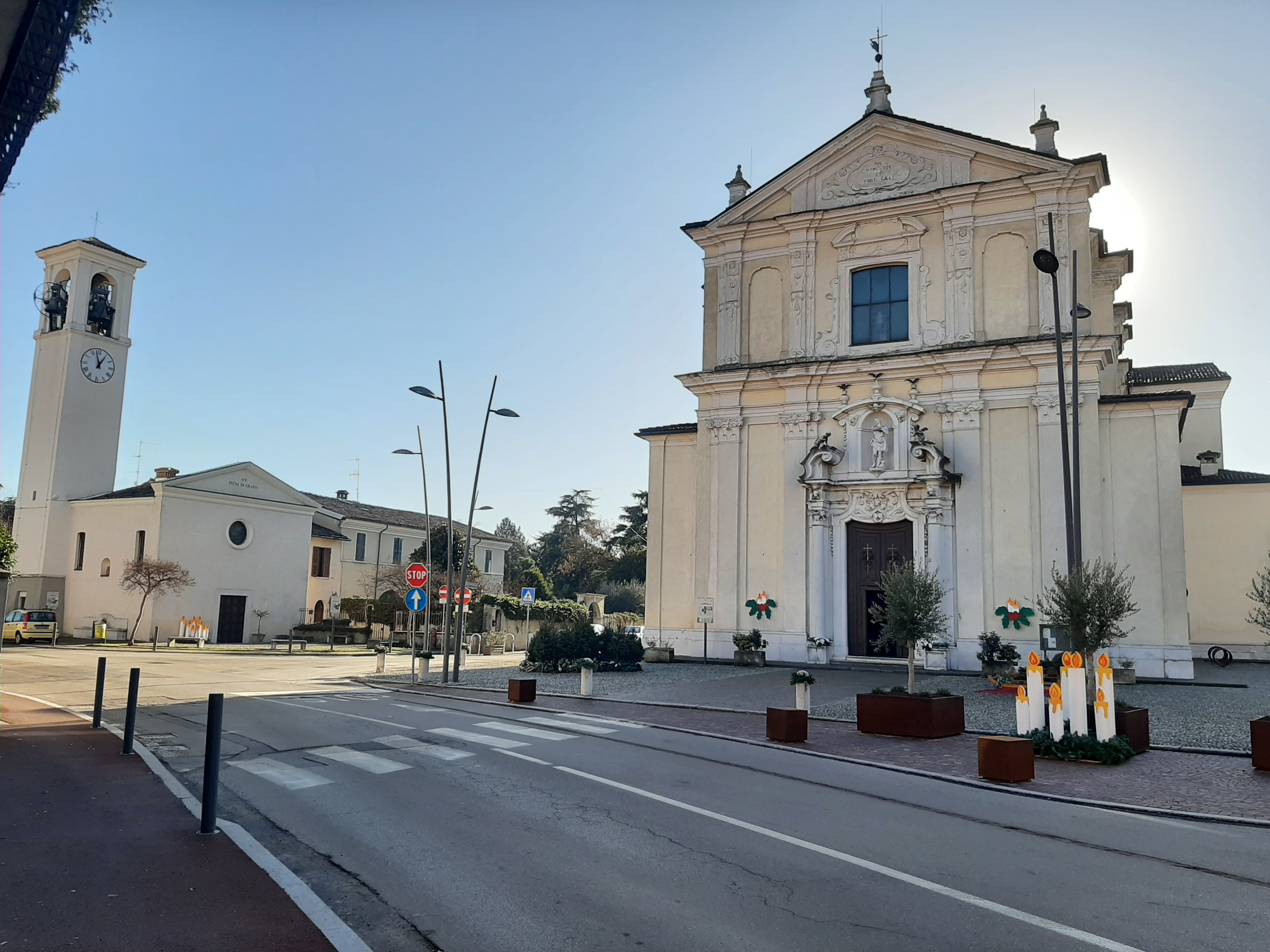
- Church of San Giovanni Battista and Church of Santa Maria in Castegnato

- Coat of arms

- Location within Italy Location within Lombardy
- Coordinates: 45°34′N 10°7′E
- Country: Italy
- Region: Lombardy
- Province: Brescia (BS)
- Frazioni: Gussago, Ospitaletto, Paderno Franciacorta, Passirano, Rodengo-Saiano, Roncadelle, Travagliato

Area
  - Total: 9 km^{2} (3.5 sq mi)
- Elevation: 143 m (469 ft)

Population (2011)
  - Total: 8,102
  - Density: 900/km^{2} (2,300/sq mi)
- Demonym: Castegnatesi
- Time zone: UTC+1 (CET)
  - Summer (DST): UTC+2 (CEST)
- Postal code: 25045
- Dialing code: 030
- ISTAT code: 017040
- Patron saint: San Vitale
- Saint day: Second Sunday in May
- Website: Official website

Castegnato (Brescian: Castegnàt) is a town and comune in the province of Brescia in Lombardy, northern Italy.
