= Liliana Betti =

Italian screenwriter and director

- Born: 1937; Nigoline, Brescia, Italy
- Died: 19 August 1998 (aged 60–61); Adro, Brescia, Italy
- Other name: Liliane Betti
- Occupations: Screenwriter and director

Liliana Betti (1937 – 19 August 1998) was an Italian screenwriter and director. She was sometimes credited as Liliane Betti.

Born in Nigoline, Province of Brescia, Betti in 1957 moved to Rome, where she became a real-life friend of Federico Fellini. Fellini referred to her as "her boss" and as "the little goddess of ideas", and Betti was a collaborator, a casting director, a script supervisor and a second unit director for many of his films until 1980. As a screenwriter, she also often collaborated with Marco Ferreri and Enrico Oldoini. In 1991 she was nominated at the David di Donatello Award for best screenplay for Ferreri's The House of Smiles.
