= Luigi Corioni =

Italian entrepreneur

- Born: 9 June 1937; Castegnato, Kingdom of Italy
- Died: 8 March 2016 (aged 78); Brescia, Italy
- Occupation: Businessman

Luigi Corioni (9 June 1937 – 8 March 2016), also known as Gino Corioni, was an Italian businessman.

Born in Castegnato, in 1962 Corioni founded a bathroom furnishings company, Saniplast Spa. After experiences as a councilor for A.C. Milan and as president of the Ospitaletto football team, in 1985 he became president of Bologna, with whom he achieved a promotion to Serie A and a qualification in the UEFA Cup.

In 1992 Corioni left Bologna and became president of Brescia Calcio, a role he kept for 22 years, until 2014. Under his presidency, Brescia won an Anglo-Italian Cup in 1994, was a finalist of the 2001 UEFA Intertoto Cup, and achieved five promotions to Serie A, even reaching the semi-finals of the 2001–02 Coppa Italia, with coaches such as Mircea Lucescu, Carlo Mazzone, and Gianni De Biasi. He also oversaw the club's longest consecutive spell in Serie A.

Corioni was famous for having signed numerous football superstars during his tenure as Brescia's president, including Roberto Baggio, Pep Guardiola, Andrea Pirlo, Gheorghe Hagi, Luca Toni and Marek Hamšík, among others.

Corioni died at the Spedali Civili in Brescia on 8 March 2016, at the age of 78.
