= Cologne, Lombardy =

Comune in Lombardy, Italy

Cologne Culogne
- Comune
- Comune di Cologne
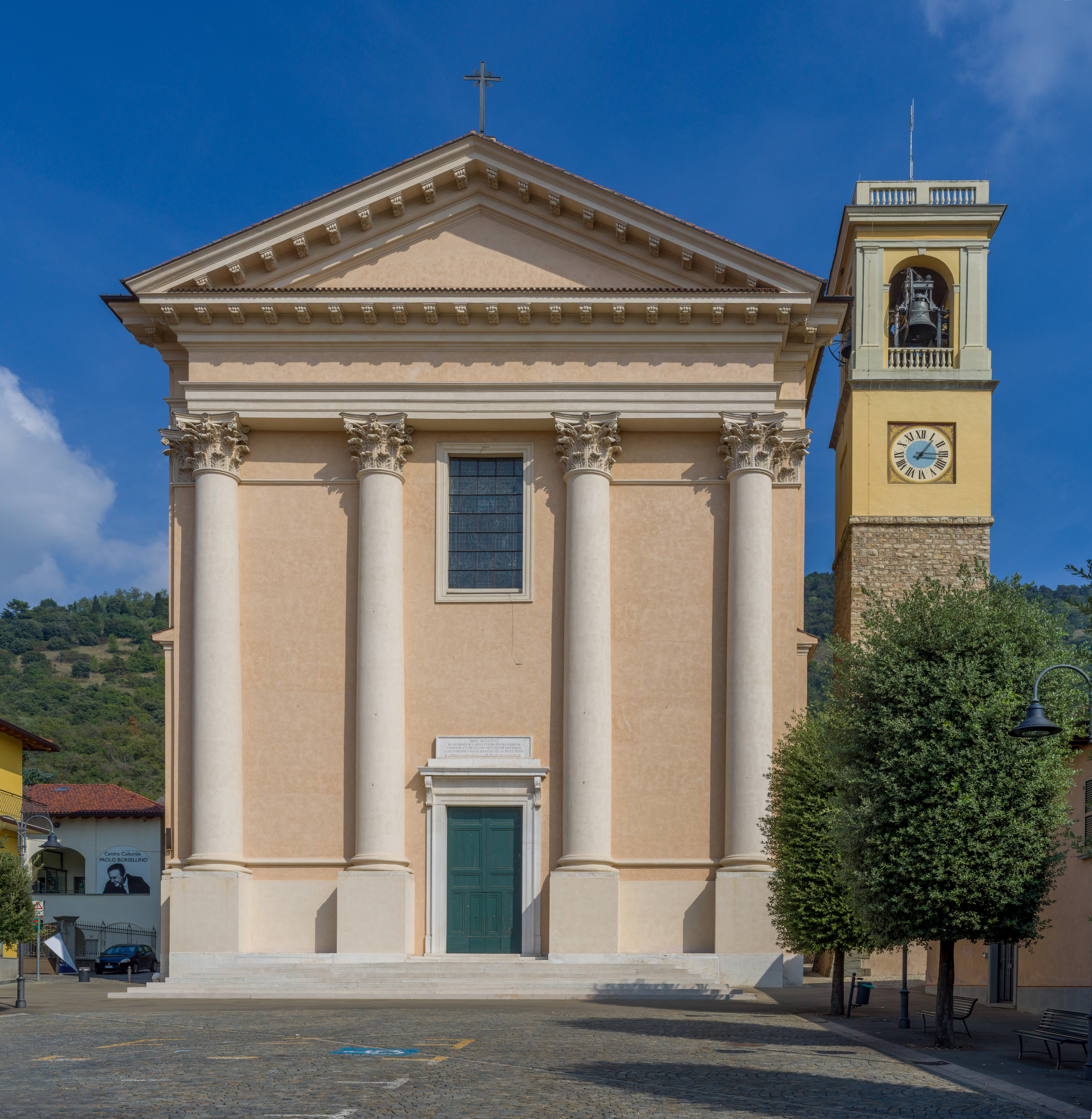
- Tha parish church ‘’Gervasio e Protasio’’ in Cologne

- Location within Italy Location within Lombardy
- Coordinates: 45°35′N 9°56′E
- Country: Italy
- Region: Lombardy
- Province: Brescia (BS)

Area
  - Total: 13 km^{2} (5.0 sq mi)
- Elevation: 183 m (600 ft)

Population (31 December 2011)
  - Total: 7,615
  - Density: 590/km^{2} (1,500/sq mi)
- Demonym: Colognesi
- Time zone: UTC+1 (CET)
  - Summer (DST): UTC+2 (CEST)
- Postal code: 25033
- Dialing code: 030
- ISTAT code: 017059
- Patron saint: Saints Gervasio and Protasio
- Saint day: 19 June
- Website: Official website

Cologne (Brescian: Culogne) is a town and commune in the province of Brescia, in Lombardy. Cologne is located in Franciacorta at the foot of Monte Orfano. Neighbouring communes are Coccaglio, Erbusco, Palazzolo sull'Oglio and Chiari.
