= Paderno =

Paderno may refer to:

== Places in Italy ==
- Paderno Dugnano, in the province of Milano, Italy
- Paderno d'Adda, in the province of Lecco, Italy
- Paderno Franciacorta, in the province of Brescia, Italy
- Paderno Ponchielli, in the province of Cremona, Italy
- Paderno del Grappa, in the province of Treviso, Italy

== Other uses ==
- Paderno (cookware), a Canadian brand of cookware
