= Gozio Amaretto =

Brand of liqueur made with bittersweet almonds

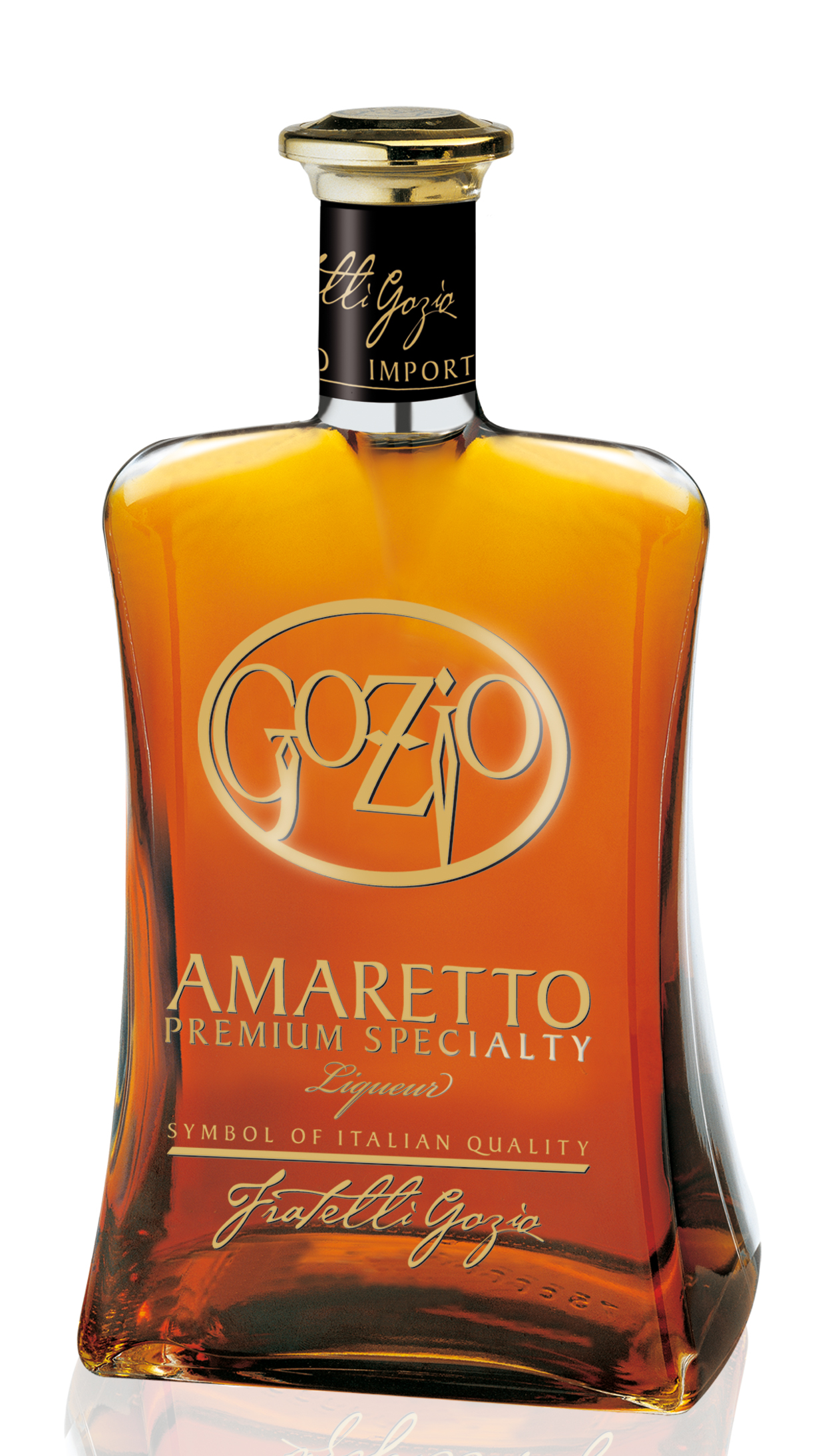
- Bottle of Gozio Amaretto
- Manufacturer: Distillerie Franciacorta
- Origin: Gussago, Italy
- Alcohol by volume: 24.0%
- Proof (US): 48

Gozio Amaretto is a brand of amaretto, made with bittersweet almonds. It is produced by Distillerie Franciacorta, a 113-year-old company based in Gussago, Italy, using a proprietary method and formula. The brand is imported and sold in the United States by Total Beverage Solution.

Gozio Amaretto is also 100% natural, and adds no artificial aromas, extracts or additives.

== History ==
Distillerie Franciacorta was founded in 1901 by Luigi Gozio in Gussago, a town located in the Province of Brescia. It was originally dedicated to the production of grappa, an alcohol produced from the distillation of grapes. The company began to produce amaretto in the 1950s, as they expanded into fruit cordials and brandies.

The distillery is currently housed in Borgo Antico S. Vitale, a carefully restored complex of buildings built between the 9th and 18th centuries.

== Production ==
The company states that Gozio Amaretto is produced using a new production process that is based on a “secret formula,” which creates a higher quality liqueur. Ingredients include alcohol, burnt sugar, and bitter almonds, which are infused for sixty days. No artificial ingredients are used.
