= Corioni =

Corioni is an Italian surname. Notable people with the surname include:

- Claudio Corioni (born 1982), Italian road bicycle racer
- Luigi Corioni (1937–2016), Italian businessman
