= Cellatica =

Cellatica Saladega
- Comune
- Comune di Cellatica
- Coat of arms

- Location within Italy Location within Lombardy
- Coordinates: 45°35′N 10°11′E
- Country: Italy
- Region: Lombardy
- Province: Brescia (BS)
- Frazioni: Fantasina

Government
  - Mayor: Marco Marini

Area
  - Total: 6.55 km^{2} (2.53 sq mi)
- Elevation: 170 m (560 ft)

Population (30 June 2017)
  - Total: 4,923
  - Density: 752/km^{2} (1,950/sq mi)
- Demonym: Cellatichesi
- Time zone: UTC+1 (CET)
  - Summer (DST): UTC+2 (CEST)
- Postal code: 25060
- Dialing code: 030
- Patron saint: Saint George
- Saint day: 23 April
- Website: https://www.comune.cellatica.bs.it/

Cellatica (Brescian: Saladega) is a comune in the province of Brescia, in Lombardy.

== Geography ==
Located at the feet of the Brescian Prealps. It is bounded by other communes of Brescia, Collebeato and Gussago. It is located in an area, Franciacorta, traditionally known for the production of wines.
