= Cazzago San Martino =

Cazzago San Martino Casàc
- Comune
- Comune di Cazzago San Martino
- Location within Italy Location within Lombardy
- Coordinates: 45°34′54″N 10°1′33″E
- Country: Italy
- Region: Lombardy
- Province: Brescia (BS)
- Frazioni: Bornato, Calino, Pedrocca, Barco, Costa, Ca' del Diaôl

Area
  - Total: 22.14 km^{2} (8.55 sq mi)
- Highest elevation: 297 m (974 ft)
- Lowest elevation: 133 m (436 ft)

Population (2011)
  - Total: 11,069
  - Density: 500.0/km^{2} (1,295/sq mi)
- Demonym: Cazzaghesi
- Time zone: UTC+1 (CET)
  - Summer (DST): UTC+2 (CEST)
- Postal code: 25046
- Dialing code: 030
- Patron saint: Francis of Paola
- Saint day: 2 April
- Website: Official website

Cazzago San Martino (Brescian: Casàc) is a comune in the province of Brescia, in Lombardy in Franciacorta. It is bounded by other communes of Rovato, Ospitaletto.

== Geography ==
The altitude of the commune ranges from 133 to 297 metres (436 to 974 ft) above sea level.
