= Ospitaletto–Travagliato railway station =

Railway station in Italy

Ospitaletto–Travagliato
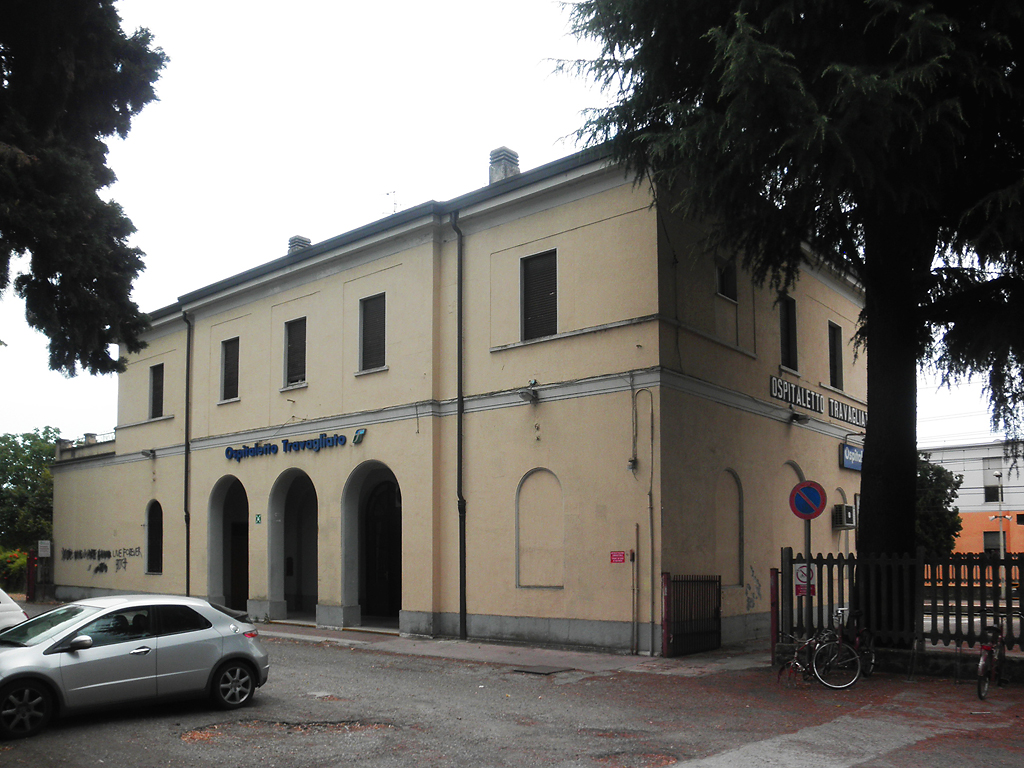
- Ospitaletto-Travagliato railway station

General information
- Location: Via Martiri della Libertà, Ospitaletto, Lombardy; Italy
- Coordinates: 45°32′45″N 10°04′27″E
- Owner: Rete Ferroviaria Italiana
- Operator: Trenord
- Lines: Milan–Venice railway Bergamo–Brescia railway
- Distance: 65.827 km (40.903 mi) from Milano Centrale
- Platforms: 2
- Tracks: 2

Other information
- Classification: Bronze
Location
- Location within Lombardy Location within Northern Italy Location within Italy

Ospitaletto–Travagliato (Italian: Stazione di Ospitaletto–Travagliato) is a railway station serving the towns of Ospitaletto and Travagliato, in the region of Lombardy, northern Italy. The station is located on the Milan–Venice railway and Bergamo–Brescia railway. The train services are operated by Trenord.

== Train services ==
The station is served by the following service(s):

- Regional services (Treno regionale) Sesto San Giovanni – Milan – Treviglio – Brescia
- Regional services (Treno regionale) Bergamo – Rovato – Brescia

== See also ==
- History of rail transport in Italy
- List of railway stations in Lombardy
- Rail transport in Italy
- Railway stations in Italy
