= Travagliato =

Travagliato Traaiàt (Lombard)
- Comune
- Comune di Travagliato
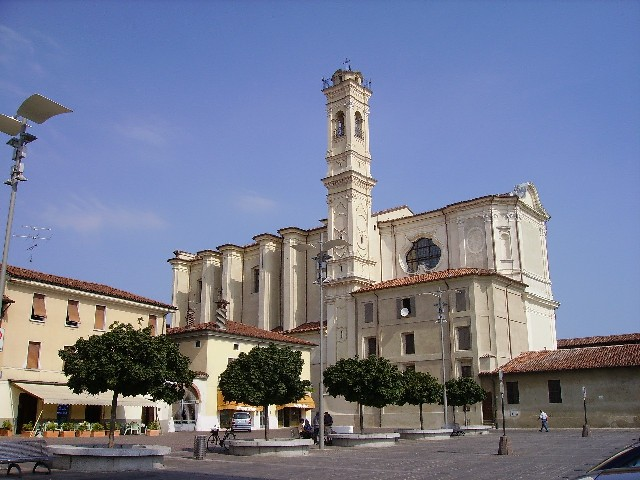

- Coat of arms

- Location within Italy Location within Lombardy
- Coordinates: 45°31′N 10°5′E
- Country: Italy
- Region: Lombardy
- Province: Brescia (BS)

Government
• Mayor
Renato Pasinetti

Area
  - Total: 17 km^{2} (6.6 sq mi)

Population (30 April 2017)
  - Total: 13,877
  - Density: 820/km^{2} (2,100/sq mi)
- Demonym: Travagliatesi
- Time zone: UTC+1 (CET)
  - Summer (DST): UTC+2 (CEST)
- Postal code: 25039
- Dialing code: 030
- Patron saint: Sts. Peter and Paulus
- Saint day: 29 June
- Website: Official website

Travagliato (Brescian: Traaiàt) is a comune in the province of Brescia, in Lombardy, northern Italy. It received the honorary title of city with a presidential decree on November 12, 2001. Its coat of arms shows a silver shovel on left blue, right white.

Travagliato is the birthplace of Italian football legends Franco Baresi and Giuseppe Baresi.

== Transport ==
- Ospitaletto-Travagliato railway station

== Twin towns ==
Travagliato is twinned with:

- Beaufort-en-Vallée, France
