= Paderno Franciacorta =

- Comune
- Comune di Paderno Franciacorta
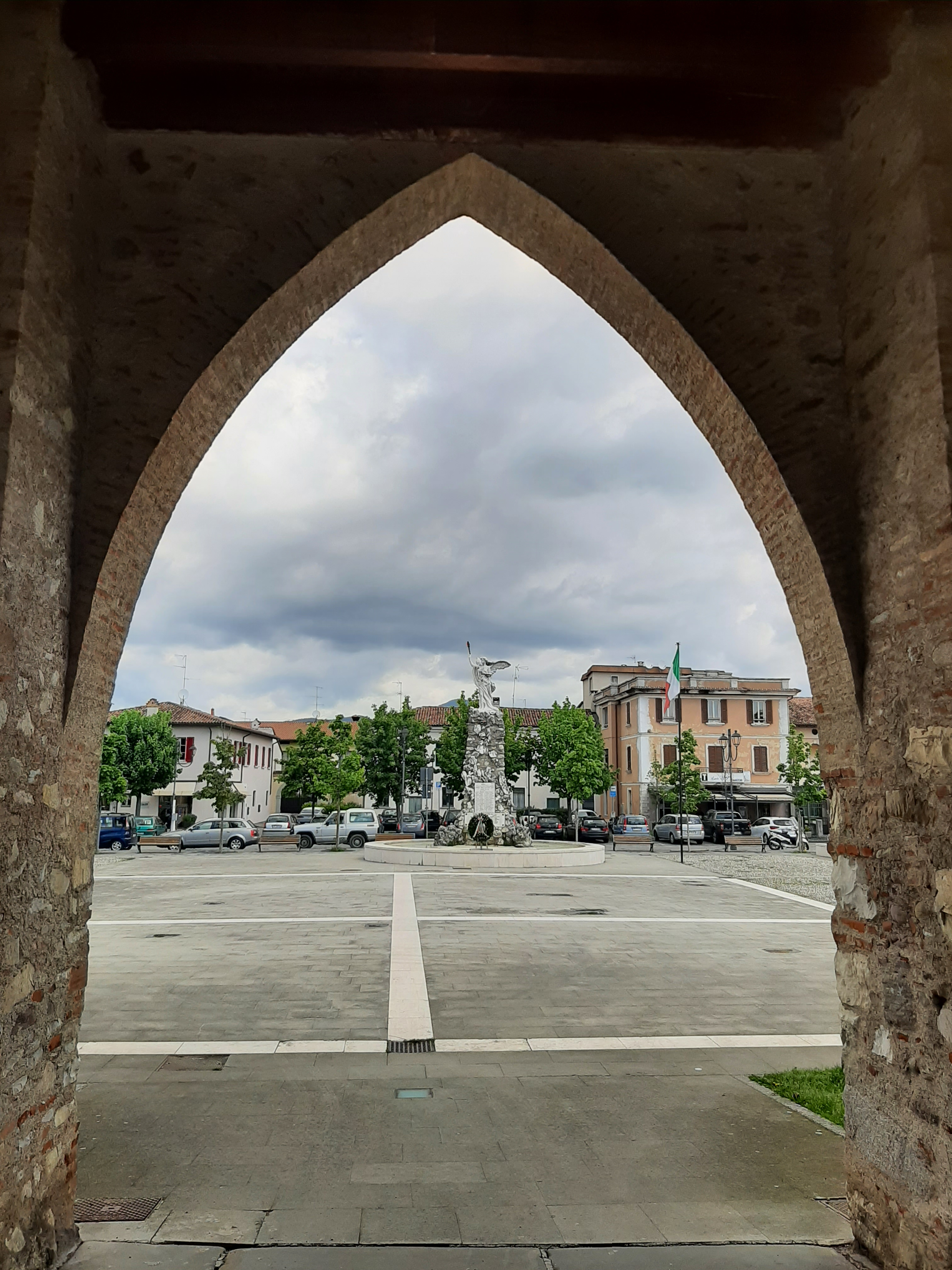

- Location within Italy Location within Lombardy
- Coordinates: 45°35′N 10°5′E
- Country: Italy
- Region: Lombardy
- Province: Brescia (BS)
- Frazioni: Castegnato, Passirano, Rodengo-Saiano

Government
  - Mayor: Silvia Gares

Area
  - Total: 5.58 km^{2} (2.15 sq mi)
- Elevation: 182 m (597 ft)

Population (31 December 2017)
  - Total: 3,661
  - Density: 656/km^{2} (1,700/sq mi)
- Demonym: Padernesi
- Time zone: UTC+1 (CET)
  - Summer (DST): UTC+2 (CEST)
- Postal code: 25050
- Dialing code: 030
- ISTAT code: 017130
- Patron saint: St. Gotthard
- Saint day: 4 May
- Website: Official website

Paderno Franciacorta (Brescian: Padèren) is a town and comune in the province of Brescia, in Lombardy.
