= Paratico =

Paratico Paràdech
- Comune
- Comune di Paratico
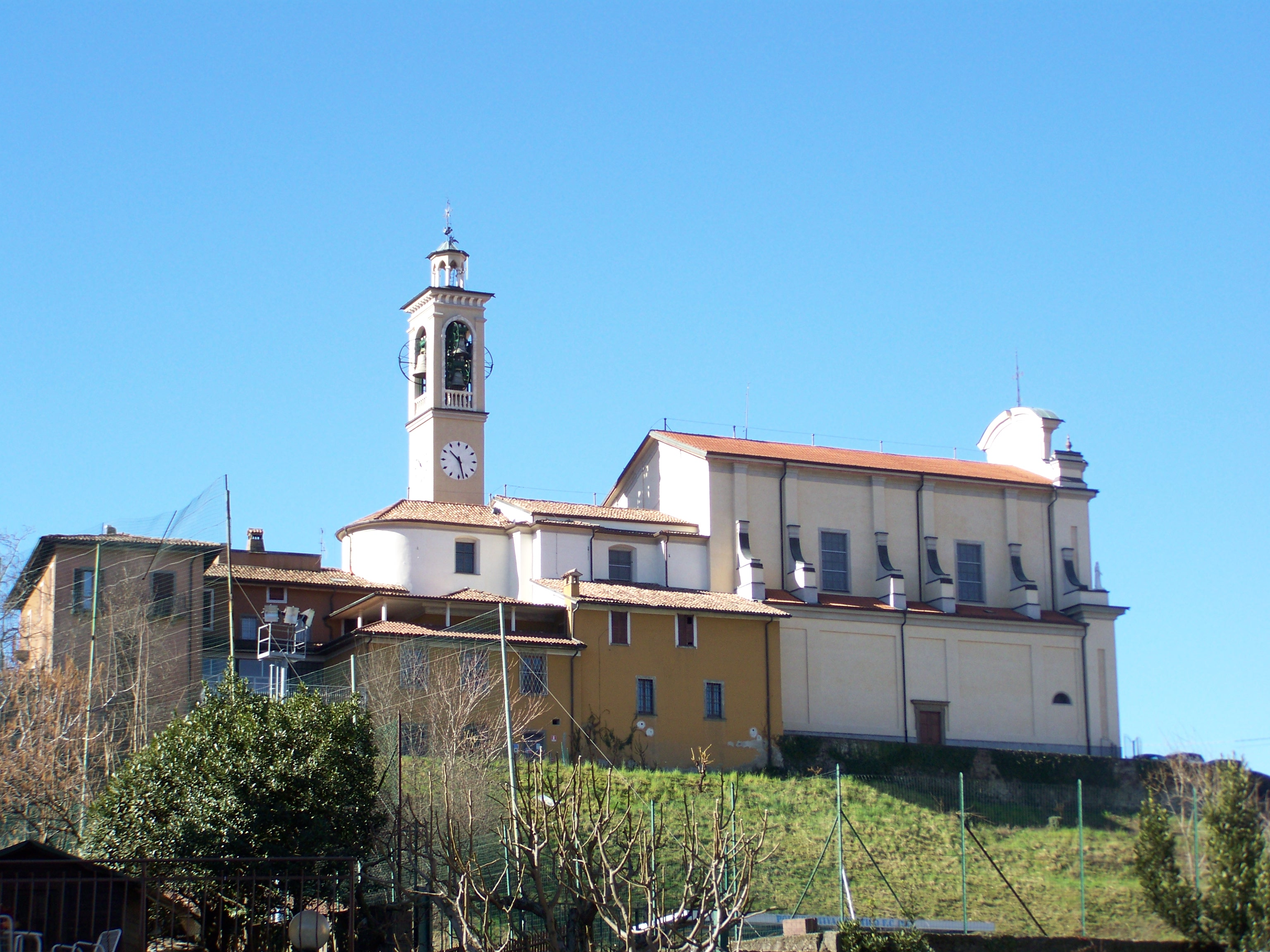
- Church

- Location within Italy Location within Lombardy
- Coordinates: 45°40′N 9°58′E
- Country: Italy
- Region: Lombardy
- Province: Brescia (BS)
- Frazioni: Adro, Capriolo, Credaro (BG), Iseo, Sarnico (BG), Villongo (BG)

Government
  - Mayor: Carlo Tengattini (lista civica Paratico Futur@) from 26/05/2014

Area
  - Total: 6 km^{2} (2.3 sq mi)

Population (2011)
  - Total: 4,485
  - Density: 750/km^{2} (1,900/sq mi)
- Demonym: Paraticesi
- Time zone: UTC+1 (CET)
  - Summer (DST): UTC+2 (CEST)
- Postal code: 25030
- Dialing code: 035
- ISTAT code: 017134
- Website: Official website

Paratico (Brescian: Paràdech) is a town and comune in the province of Brescia, in Lombardy, Italy. It is located at the southwestern end of Lake Iseo.

== Territory ==
The town of Paratico is part of the hilly area called Franciacorta.

== History ==
Paratico lies at Franciacorta's extreme western border, in a splendid position overlooking Lake Iseo. The place name had already made its appearance in the year 975, when the Longobard Erberto donated to his nephew Rotepaldo some of his properties, among which, Paratico. Its past strategic importance is attested by the impressive ruins of the powerful castello Lantieri, located on a hill top and commanding a view all over the surrounding landscape. The castle was probably built in the 13th century, perhaps on the foundations of an older castle, dating back to 1007. It rises on a solitary place, ideal to control the outlet of the Oglio river from Lake Iseo, and to survey the roads leading to the plain and to Bergamo. The Lantieri family, in the 15th century, had already spread into several branches; they sided with the Ghibellines, and owned many properties, both in Paratico and Torbiato, including some stone quarries. According to the "Chronicle of the Lantieri de Paratico family", written in 1600, Dante Alighieri stayed at the castle in 1311. Here, the poet would have drawn his inspiration to conceive Purgatory's structure and to compose some of his lyrics. In Vanzago, on the old road to Capriolo, there was a 13th-century castle, subsequently transformed into a convent and then, in 1850, into a hospital. Today it has become a farm. In the locality of S. Pietro rises the church of that name, dating back to 1730; on 8 December, every year, it is the scene of a traditional festival dedicated to the "Madonna of the Apples" (the legend says that the man used to offer an apple to his lady, in token of his love). The parish church dates back to the 15th century. Previous to the construction of S. Peter's cemetery, corpses were buried around this church; it was enlarged and renovated in 1724 and furtherly improved in 1878. Some interesting works are preserved in its interior, such as the polychrome inlaid high altar and the splendid Rosary kaltar, with marble marquetry. Fusia's water mill and irrigation ditch represent a complex medieval achievement of hydraulic engineering; they favoured the development of commercial and market activities in Paratico. The surrounding hills offer some enchanting vistas. The sandstone called "Sarnico's stone" is still quarried from these hills; it was much used for construction in past centuries. The splendid position between the lake and the hills, and its good hotel facilities, make Paratico one of the favourite tourist spots of the whole territory.
