= Provaglio d'Iseo =

Provaglio d'Iseo Proài d'Izé
- Comune
- Comune di Provaglio d'Iseo
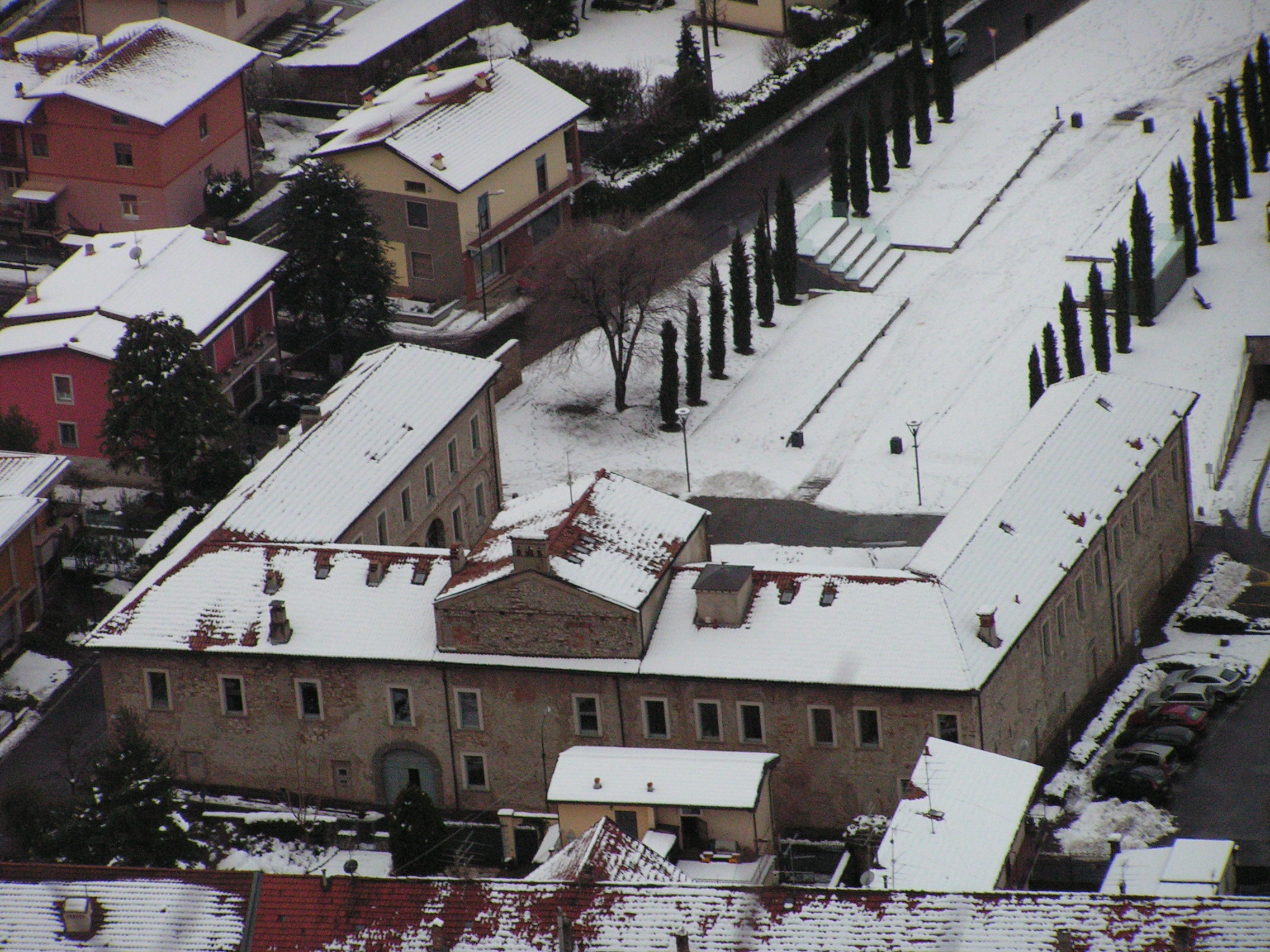
- Aerial view of Palazzo Francesconi

- Location within Italy Location within Lombardy
- Coordinates: 45°38′N 10°3′E
- Country: Italy
- Region: Lombardy
- Province: Brescia (BS)
- Frazioni: Provezze, Fantecolo

Government
  - Mayor: Marco Simonini

Area
  - Total: 16 km^{2} (6.2 sq mi)
- Elevation: 330 m (1,080 ft)

Population (2011)
  - Total: 7,237
  - Density: 450/km^{2} (1,200/sq mi)
- Demonym: Provagliesi
- Time zone: UTC+1 (CET)
  - Summer (DST): UTC+2 (CEST)
- Postal code: 25050
- Dialing code: 030
- ISTAT code: 017156
- Patron saint: Sts. Peter and Paul
- Saint day: 29 June
- Website: Official website

Provaglio d'Iseo (Brescian: Proài d'Izé) is a town and comune in the province of Brescia, in the Lombardy region in Italy. Provaglio d'Iseo is located 3 km south of the town Iseo, in the historical region of Franciacorta, famous for its wine production.

Points of interest include the monastery of San Pietro in Lamosa and the nearby Torbiere Sebine, a natural marshland area, important for birds.
