= Monticelli Brusati =

- Comune
- Comune di Monticelli Brusati
- Coat of arms

- Location within Italy Location within Lombardy
- Coordinates: 45°38′N 10°6′E
- Country: Italy
- Region: Lombardy
- Province: Brescia (BS)
- Frazioni: Bozze, Calchera, Foina, Fontana, Gaina, La Torre, Villa

Area
  - Total: 10 km^{2} (3.9 sq mi)

Population (2011)
  - Total: 4,432
  - Density: 440/km^{2} (1,100/sq mi)
- Demonym: montecellesi
- Time zone: UTC+1 (CET)
  - Summer (DST): UTC+2 (CEST)
- Postal code: 25040
- Dialing code: 030
- ISTAT code: 017112
- Website: Official website

Monticelli Brusati (Brescian: Muntasel) is a town and comune in the province of Brescia, in Lombardy, in northern Italy.
