= Ome, Lombardy =

Ome Óme
- Comune
- Comune di Ome
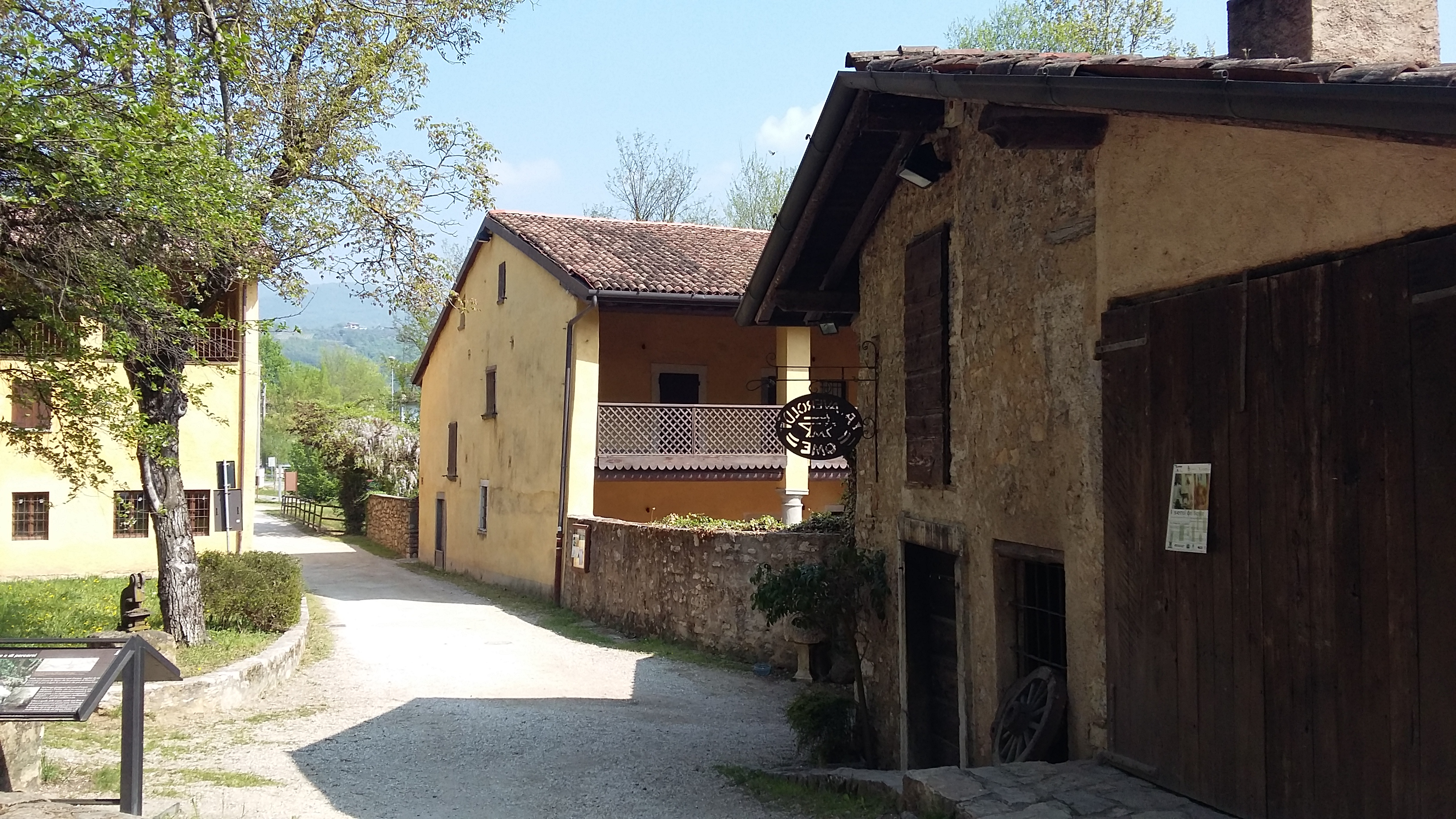
- Maglio Averoldi

- Location within Italy Location within Lombardy
- Coordinates: 45°38′N 10°07′E
- Country: Italy
- Region: Lombardy
- Province: Brescia (BS)
- Frazioni: Cerezzata, Maglio, Prato, Valle

Government
  - Mayor: Alberto Vanoglio

Area
  - Total: 9 km^{2} (3.5 sq mi)

Population (2011)
  - Total: 3,264
  - Density: 360/km^{2} (940/sq mi)
- Demonym: Omensi
- Time zone: UTC+1 (CET)
  - Summer (DST): UTC+2 (CEST)
- Postal code: 25050
- Dialing code: 030
- Patron saint: St. Stephen
- Saint day: December 26
- Website: Official website

Ome (Brescian: Óme) is a town and comune in the province of Brescia, in Lombardy.
