= Coccaglio =

Coccaglio Cocài
- Comune
- Comune di Coccaglio
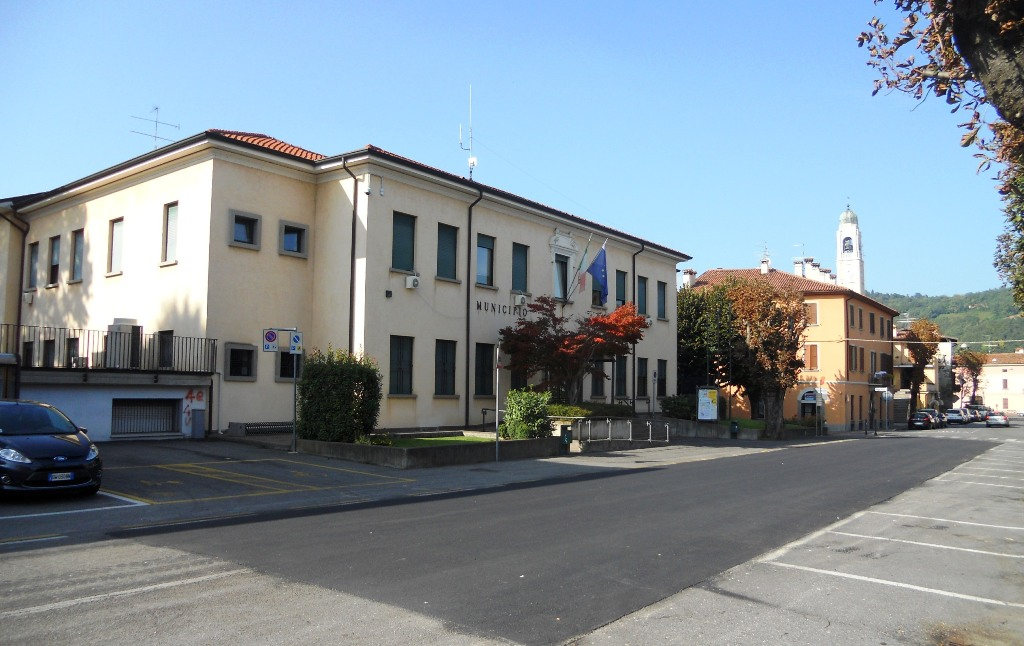
- Town hall

- Location within Italy Location within Lombardy
- Coordinates: 45°34′N 9°59′E
- Country: Italy
- Region: Lombardy
- Province: Brescia (BS)
- Frazioni: Castrezzato, Chiari, Cologne, Erbusco, Rovato

Government
  - Mayor: Alberto Facchetti

Area
  - Total: 11 km^{2} (4.2 sq mi)

Population (31 December 2011)
  - Total: 8,660
  - Density: 790/km^{2} (2,000/sq mi)
- Time zone: UTC+1 (CET)
  - Summer (DST): UTC+2 (CEST)
- Postal code: 25030
- Dialing code: 030
- ISTAT code: 017056
- Website: Official website

Coccaglio (Brescian: Cocài) is a town and comune in the province of Brescia, in Lombardy, Italy. It is approximately 32 kilometres (20 mi) west of Brescia and 35 kilometres (22 mi) southeast of Bergamo. The town is situated under the Monte Orfano, a lone hill in the midst of the Pianura Padana.

It was the birthplace, in 1553, of Luca Marenzio, one of the most influential composers of madrigals of the late 16th century.

The church of Santa Maria Nascente is the town's main church.

== History ==
The train station of Coccaglio is a historic building. This station is still in service, connecting Coccaglio to most of the surrounding cities directly. The history of the station starts when in the 1850s it was installed as a stop om the Milano-Venezia railroad. In 1878 a new direct connection was made at a station in Rovato, the town bordering with Coccaglio on the East. This new connection turned the stop at the Station in Coccaglio into a local railroad stop.

== Businesses ==
Coccaglio is home to the Hotel Touring, a four star hotel, and the clothing store Giulia.
