= Adro =

- Comune
- Comune di Adro
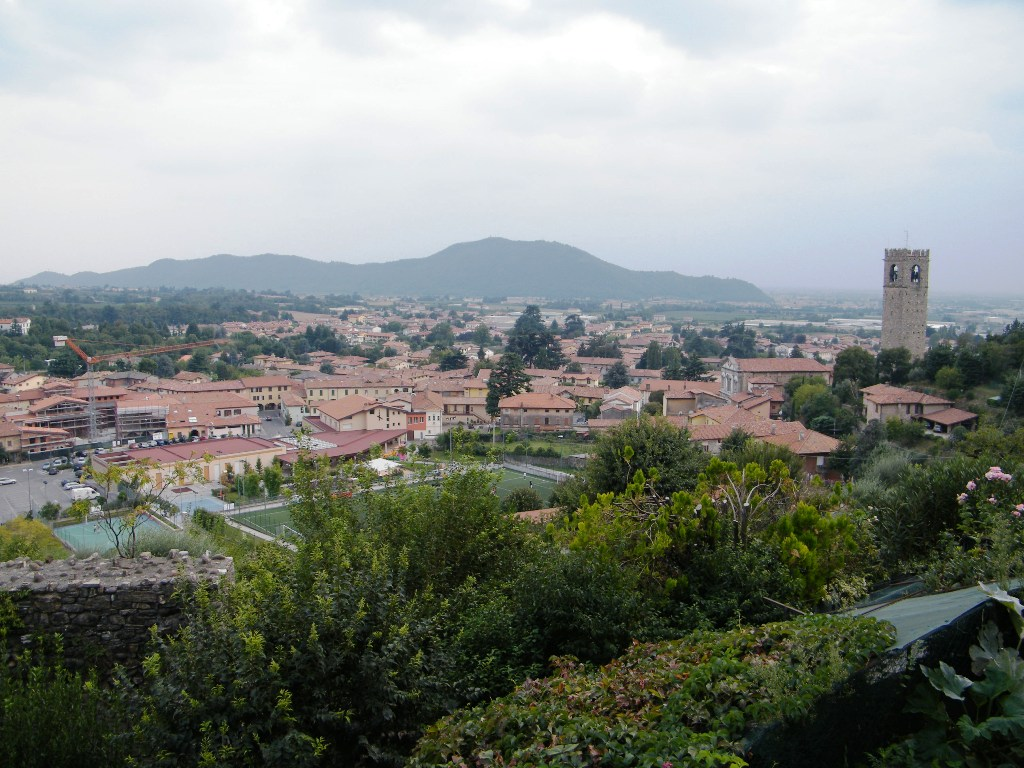
- Panorama. Adro (2010)

- Location within Italy Location within Lombardy
- Coordinates: 45°37′N 09°57′E
- Country: Italy
- Region: Lombardy
- Province: Brescia (BS)
- Frazioni: Torbiato

Government
  - Mayor: Davide Moretti

Area
  - Total: 14 km^{2} (5.4 sq mi)
- Elevation: 271 m (889 ft)

Population (2020)
  - Total: 7,194
  - Density: 510/km^{2} (1,300/sq mi)
- Demonym: Adrensi
- Time zone: UTC+1 (CET)
  - Summer (DST): UTC+2 (CEST)
- Postal code: 25030
- Dialing code: 030
- Patron saint: San Giovanni Battista
- Website: Official website

Adro (Brescian: Àder) is a town and comune in the province of Brescia, in Lombardy, with a traditional wine-growing vocation favored by its position in the Franciacorta area (northern Italy).

== Physical geography ==
The municipality of Adro is located at the foot of Monte Alto, in Franciacorta about six kilometers from Lago d'Iseo, in the southwestern part of province of Brescia.

== Origin of the name ==
From what is reported by Mazza (1986), the origins of the toponym are uncertain: Dante Olivieri claims that it would come from Latin ater or atro ("black", "dark", "obscure"), while Paolo Guerrini suggested the derivation from acer, demonstrating the ancient presence of maple woods. In a document of 822 it is called Atro.

== History ==
The oldest evidence of anthropization in the municipality of Adro are Neolithic finds found in the hamlet of Torbiato. The finds of tombs with grave goods from the late imperial period (III century) and Longobardi date back to a later period.

The oldest news of the village of Adro is present in the document in which it is mentioned as Atro, dated April 10, 822. In it, the Abbess Eremperga gave a vico con corte to a certain Rampergo.

The castle was built between 13th and 14th century: in acts of 1006 and 1050 Adro is named as 'vicus and not as castrum. Both under the domination of the Visconti and under that of Venice, Adro administratively belonged to the quadra (Town Square) of Palazzolo.

During the Venetian domination – popularly known as Domini di Terraferma – of the territory (from 1426 to 1797) the Bargnani family gained importance in the village, important in the life of the town between the 17th and 18th centuries, to whom the Dandolo counts succeeded.

=== Coat of arms ===
The town's coat of arms is formed by a capital "A" with a rounded top, of silver color on a green field, which is surrounded by three bunches of grapes with its branches and tendrils. Of these clusters, two are at the top, while the other is at the larger tip; the vine is golden, loading the bunch. The oldest form of this coat of arms appears in the frescoes sixteenth century of the ancient parish church.

== Monuments and places of interest ==
Buildings of interest in the municipality of Adro:

=== Religious architectures ===
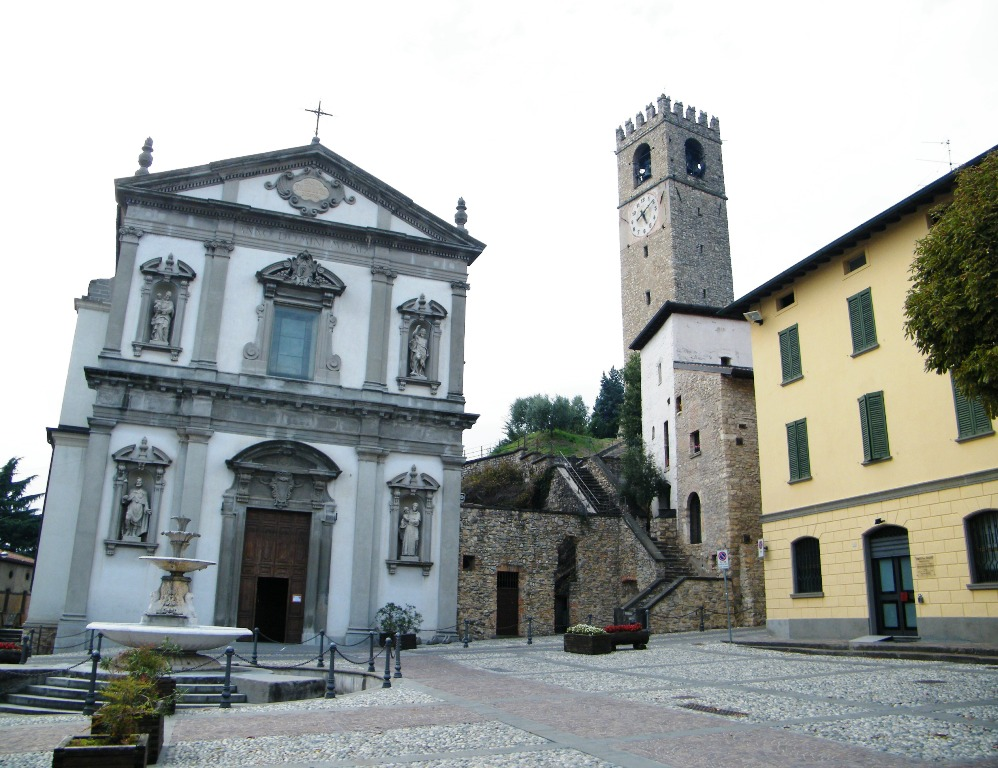
Parish Church of San Giovanni Battista

- Bargnani church.
- Chiesa parrocchiale di San Giovanni Battista: whose construction was completed in 1769 and saw the ten-year commitment of the local population in its realization. It is located in the center of the town, facing the square decorated with a fountain from the Vantini period. Inside there is a triptych from the Romanino school (16th-century) and presents decorations with eighteenth-century stuccoes. The main altar is the work of Andrea Fantoni and other artists in his workshop.
- Church of Santa Maria in Favento: 15th century with frescoes from 15th and 16th century, restored in 1962.
- Church of Santa Maria Assunta: built in the 16th century on the hill in the ancient castle, it was parish until the current parish church was built, while today it serves as a cemetery chapel. Equipped with large Gothic style bays, it has the entrances on the northern side and a staircase protected by a trussed arcade.
- Sanctuary of the Madonna della Neve: built in Eighteenth century on a project by the abbot Gaspare Turbini It is a building with a central plan in octagonal shape with a dome.

=== Civil architectures ===
- Palazzo Bargnani-Dandolo: built by the Bargnani family in 17th century. It was inherited by the Dandolo family and is currently the seat of the Town Hall. In front of the palace bust of the countess Ermellina Maselli Dandolo by the sculptor Emilio Magoni. In the hall of the municipal council there is a portrait of the nobleman Gaetano Bargnani painted by Pitocchetto.
- Villa De Riva: built by the architect Antonio Tagliaferri at the end of the 19th century.

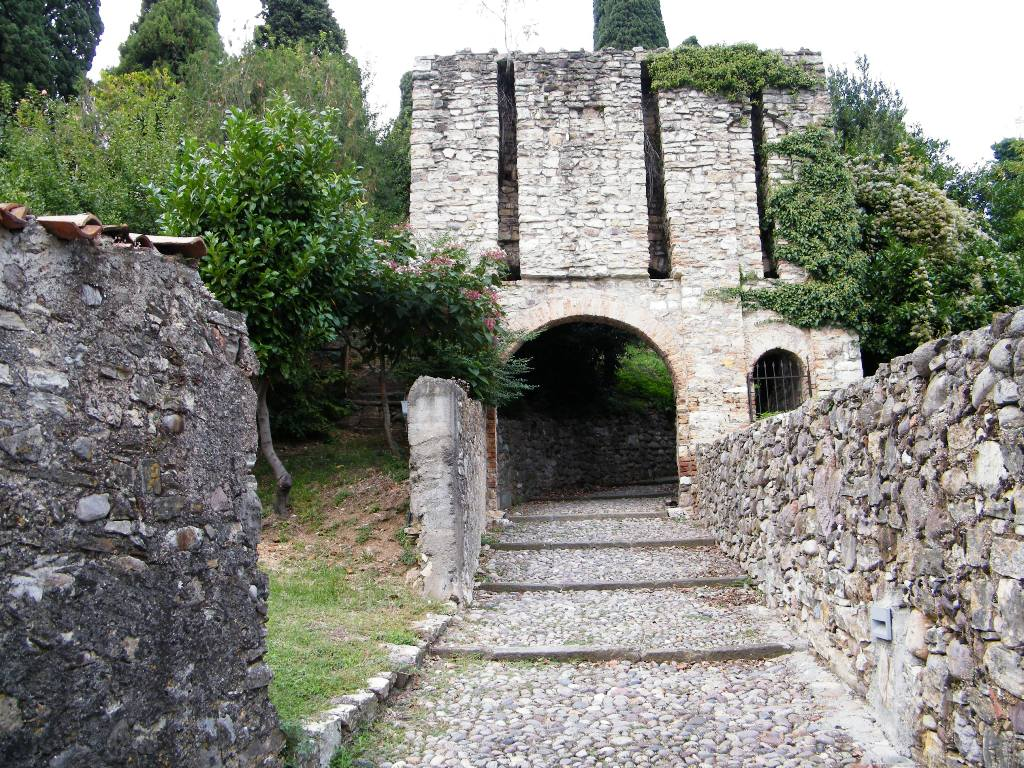
Castle gate

=== Military architectures ===
- Tower: in bare stone, with Ghibelline battlements and a terragonal plan, which with the ancient castle was part of the medieval defensive system of the town.
- Castle: it was built on the slopes of the mountain, where there is the cemetery, between the 13th and 14th century. As of 2013, only the fourteenth-century entrance to the drawbridge remains. In the cemetery, Vincenzo Vela's Bargnani-Dandolo grave (19th century).

== Demographics ==
=== Demographic evolution ===
Historical population

Year	Pop.	±%
1861	2,224	—
1871	2,334	+4.9%
1881	2,534	+8.6%
1901	3,087	+21.8%
1911	3,418	+10.7%
1921	3,669	+7.3%
1931	4,111	+12.0%
1936	4,254	+3.5%

Year	Pop.	±%
1951	4,746	+11.6%
1961	5,013	+5.6%
1971	5,586	+11.4%
1981	5,809	+4.0%
1991	5,846	+0.6%
2001	6,421	+9.8%
2011	7,114	+10.8%

Source: Abitanti censiti

=== Ethnicities and foreign minorities ===
Foreigners residing in the municipality are 651, that is 9.19% of the population. The following are the most consistent groups:

- Morocco, 173 – 2.44%
- Romania, 135 – 1.24%
- Albania, 67 – 0.94%
- India, 53 – 0.74%
- Senegal, 51 – 0.72%

=== Languages and dialects ===
In the local dialect (Brescian) there is the phrase Laurà per la césa de Ader, or to work for the church of Adro. With this statement we mean generally to work for free: the origin of the saying goes back to the great voluntary work in which the people of Adriano applied themselves when they decided to build their church, also engaging on holidays without any compensation.

== Anthropic geography ==
The municipal statute recognizes the existence of two localities: Adro and Torbiato. This last fraction was an autonomous municipality until 1928, when it was abolished with royal decree no. 1679.

== Economy ==
The sector that absorbs the largest number of workers is the manufacturing industry (which, in 2001, employed 48% of the employed) followed by construction (23%) and commerce (9%); agriculture (which accounted for 4% of employees in 2001) has grown in recent years due to the wine-growing vocation of the area and occupies a prestigious position in the panorama of the production of Franciacorta. Construction covers 46% of artisan businesses as the location of the municipality is in the urbanized area of Lombardy.

== Infrastructure and transport ==
=== Roads ===
- A4 motorway
- Provincial road SP XI
- Provincial road SP XII
- Provincial road SP 17

=== Railways ===
The municipality is served by the Borgonato-Adro station, located along the Brescia-Iseo-Edolo railway, served by regional trains operated by Trenord as part of the service contract stipulated with Lombardy region.

Between 1897 and 1915 Torbiato also hosted a station of the Iseo-Rovato-Chiari tramway.

== Administration ==
=== List of mayors ===
Period		Office holder	Party	Title	Notes
1975	1980	Battista Mansueti	DC	Mayor	
1980	1985	Paolino Parzani	PRI	Mayor	
1985	1990	Augusto Corsini	DC	Mayor	
1990	1995	Piergiuseppe Mondini	DC	Mayor	

Below is the list of mayors elected directly by citizens (since 1995):

Period		Office holder	Party	Title	Notes
24 April 1995	15 September 2003	Paolino Parzani	civic list	Mayor	
September 15, 2003	June 14, 2004	Roberta Verrusio		Commissioner	
June 14, 2004	May 26, 2014	Danilo Oscar Lancini	Northern League	Mayor	
May 26, 2014	in office	Paolo Rosa	Northern League	Mayor	

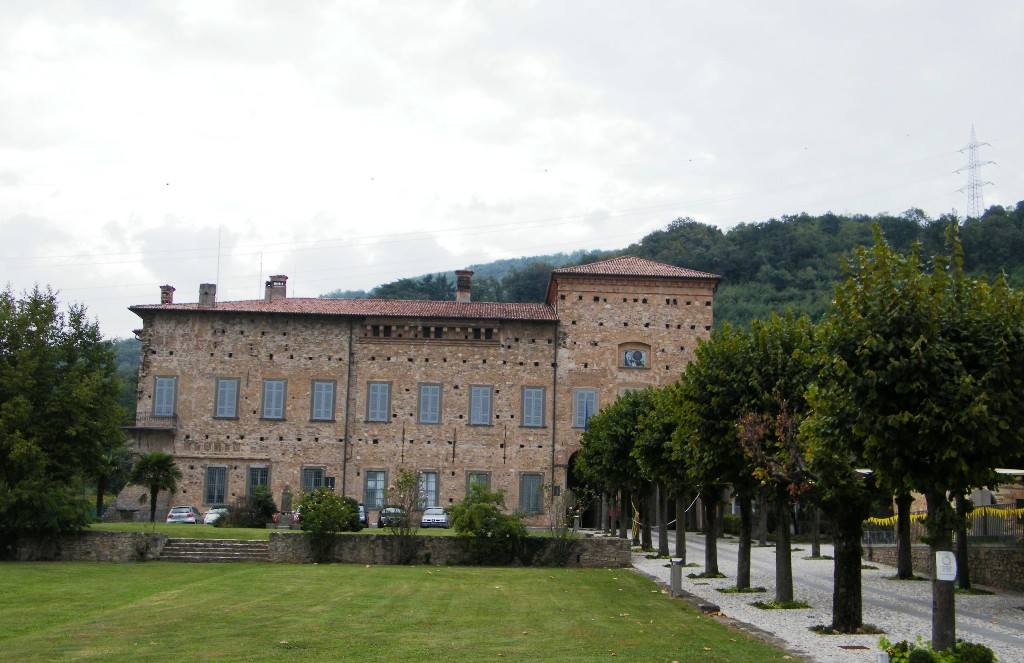
The town hall of Adro

=== Twin-towns ===
Adro is twinned with:

- Vezia, Switzerland.

== Sports ==
The football club A.S.D. Adrense 1909, who played in regional amateur championships.

== Bibliography ==
- Attilio Mazza (1986). Il Bresciano – Volume II. Le colline e i laghi. Bergamo: Bortolotti. pp. 208–209. OCLC 878134431.
