= Passirano =

Passirano Pasirà
- Comune
- Comune di Passirano
- Coat of arms

- Location within Italy Location within Lombardy
- Coordinates: 45°36′N 10°4′E
- Country: Italy
- Region: Lombardy
- Province: Brescia (BS)
- Frazioni: Camignone, Monterotondo, Valenzano

Area
  - Total: 13 km^{2} (5.0 sq mi)
- Elevation: 250 m (820 ft)

Population (31 December 2011)
  - Total: 7,196
  - Density: 550/km^{2} (1,400/sq mi)
- Time zone: UTC+1 (CET)
  - Summer (DST): UTC+2 (CEST)
- Postal code: 25050
- Dialing code: 030
- ISTAT code: 017136
- Patron saint: San Zenone
- Saint day: Second Sunday of October
- Website: Official website

Passirano (Brescian: Pasirà) is a comune in the province of Brescia, in Lombardy, Italy. Passirano is located 15 km northwest of Brescia, in the historical region of Franciacorta.

== Notable people ==
- Andrea Cassarà (born 1984), Olympic fencer
