= Rodengo-Saiano =

Rodengo-Saiano Rodéngh-Saià
- Comune
- Comune di Rodengo-Saiano
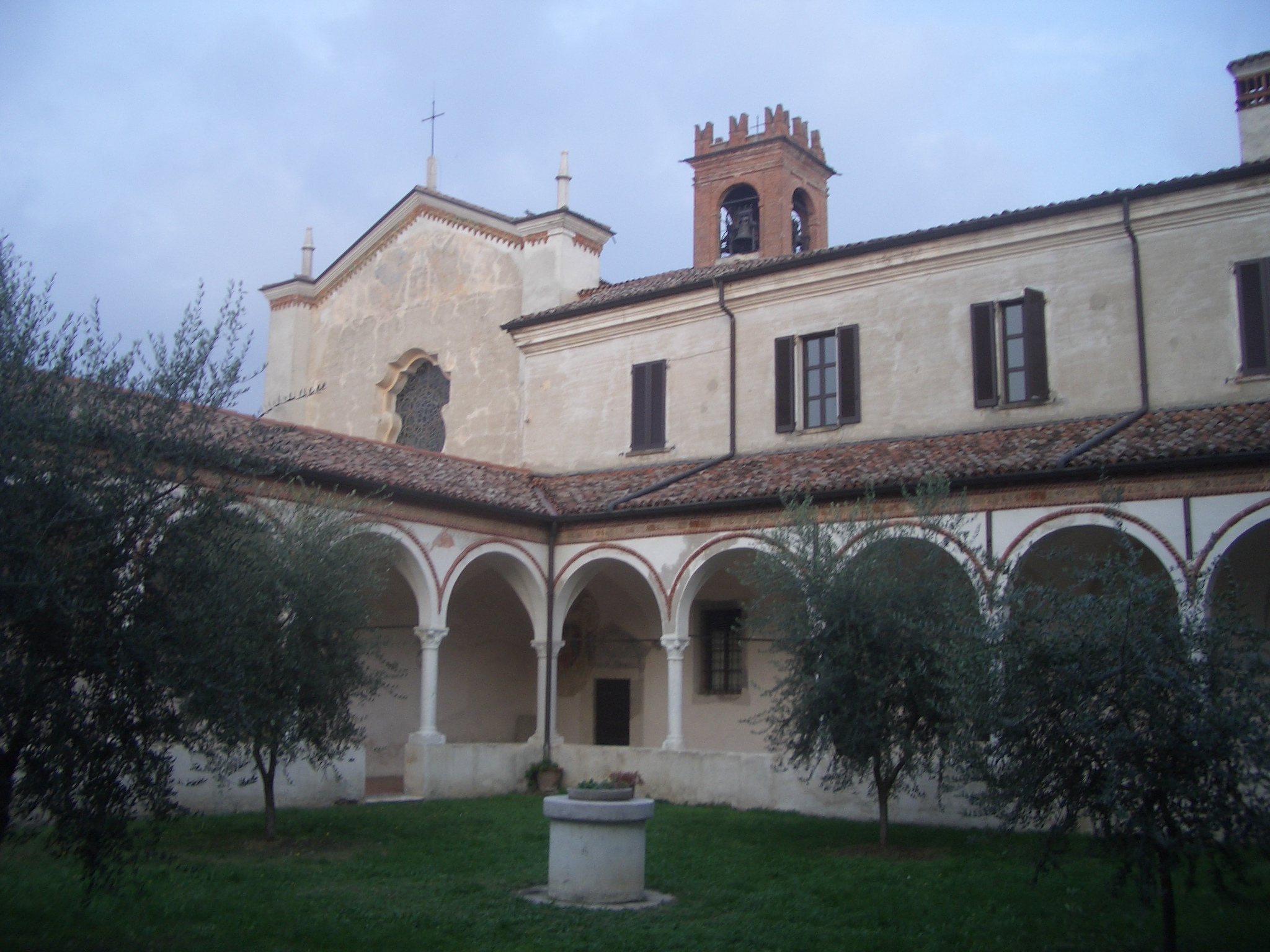
- Cloister of the Abbey of St. Nicholas

- Coat of arms

- Location within Italy Location within Lombardy
- Coordinates: 45°36′N 10°7′E
- Country: Italy
- Region: Lombardy
- Province: Brescia (BS)
- Frazioni: Bettola, Bettolino, Delma, Moie, Padergnone, Ponte Cingoli

Government
  - Mayor: Rosa Vitale (lista civica)

Area
  - Total: 12.86 km^{2} (4.97 sq mi)
- Elevation: 176 m (577 ft)

Population (2024)
  - Total: 9,889
  - Density: 769.0/km^{2} (1,992/sq mi)
- Demonym: rodenghesi or saianesi
- Time zone: UTC+1 (CET)
  - Summer (DST): UTC+2 (CEST)
- Postal code: 25050
- Dialing code: 030
- ISTAT code: 017163
- Patron saint: Saint Nicholas of Bari
- Saint day: 6 December
- Website: Official website

Rodengo-Saiano (Brescian: Rodéngh-Saià) is a comune in the province of Brescia, in Lombardy. A center of the Franciacorta historical region, it was founded in 1927 from the communes of Rodengo and Saiano.

It is home to a Cluniac monastery, the Abbazia di San Nicola (Abbey of St. Nicholas), founded in the mid-11th century.

== Twin towns ==
- Kürten, Germany
