= Ospitaletto =

Ospitaletto Öspedalèt
- Comune
- Comune di Ospitaletto
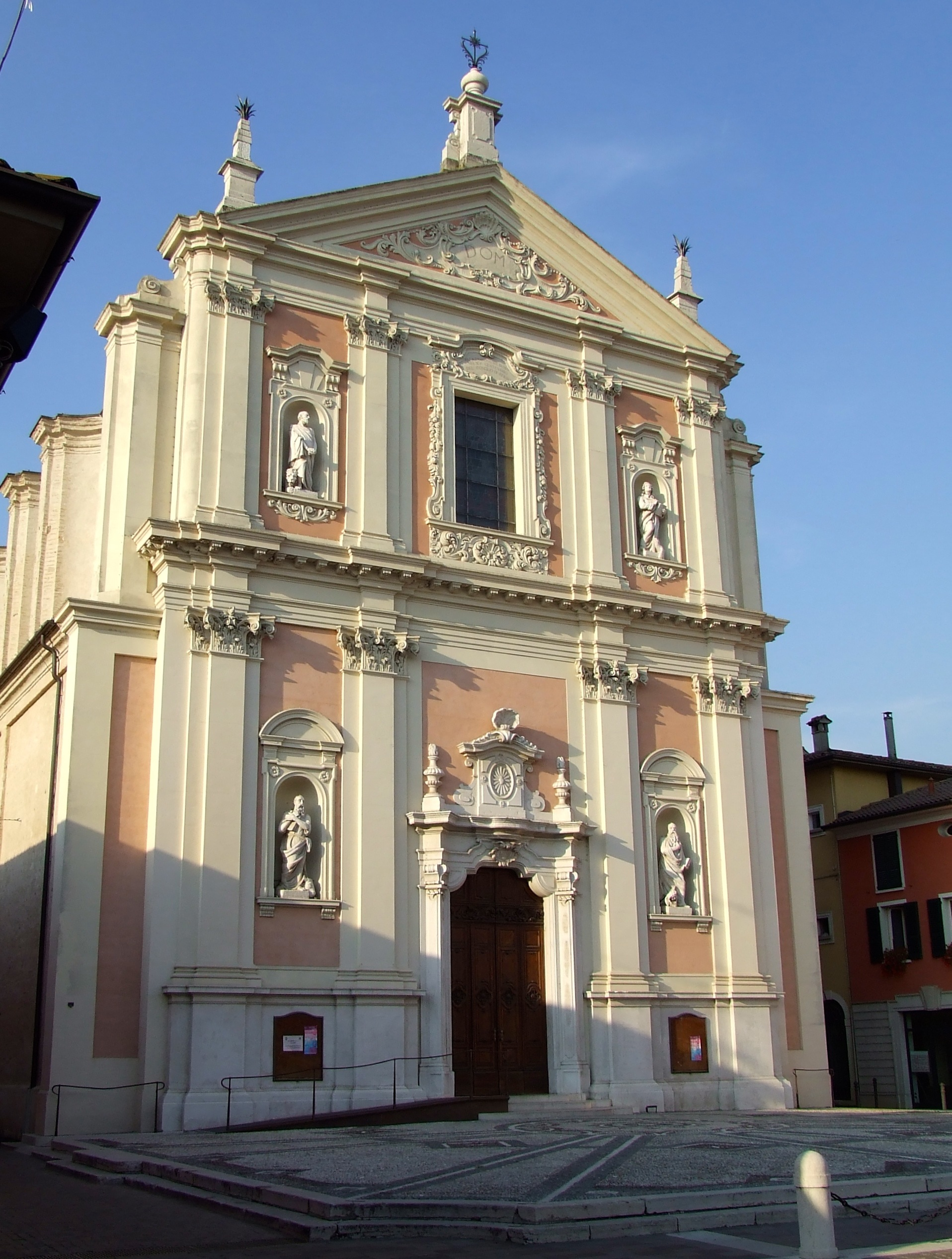
- Church of Saint James the Greater

- Coat of arms

- Location within Italy Location within Lombardy
- Coordinates: 45°33′N 10°05′E
- Country: Italy
- Region: Lombardy
- Province: Brescia (BS)
- Frazioni: Lovernato

Government
  - Mayor: Laura Treccani

Area
  - Total: 8 km^{2} (3.1 sq mi)

Population (2011)
  - Total: 14,217
  - Density: 1,800/km^{2} (4,600/sq mi)
- Demonym: Ospitalettesi
- Time zone: UTC+1 (CET)
  - Summer (DST): UTC+2 (CEST)
- Postal code: 25035
- Dialing code: 030
- Patron saint: St. James
- Saint day: July 25
- Website: Official website

Ospitaletto (Brescian: Öspedalèt) is a town and comune in the province of Brescia, in Lombardy.

== Transport ==
- Ospitaletto-Travagliato railway station

== Sport ==
- AC Ospitaletto Franciacorta, a football club who compete in Serie C.
