= Corte Franca =

Corte Franca Córte Frànca
- Comune
- Comune di Corte Franca
- Location within Italy Location within Lombardy
- Coordinates: 45°38′N 9°59′E
- Country: Italy
- Region: Lombardy
- Province: Brescia (BS)
- Frazioni: Borgonato, Colombaro, Nigoline Bonomelli, Timoline (sede comunale)

Area
  - Total: 14 km^{2} (5.4 sq mi)
- Elevation: 220 m (720 ft)

Population (2011)
  - Total: 7,236
  - Density: 520/km^{2} (1,300/sq mi)
- Demonym: Cortefranchesi
- Time zone: UTC+1 (CET)
  - Summer (DST): UTC+2 (CEST)
- Postal code: 25040
- Dialing code: 030
- ISTAT code: 017062
- Patron saint: Saints Cosma and Damiano
- Saint day: 26 September
- Website: Official website

Corte Franca (Brescian: Córte Frànco) is a town and comune in the province of Brescia, in Lombardy.

== Twin cities/towns ==
- - Aberdour, Fife, Scotland (since 31 July 2004).
