= Erbusco =

Erbusco Erbösch
- Comune
- Comune di Erbusco
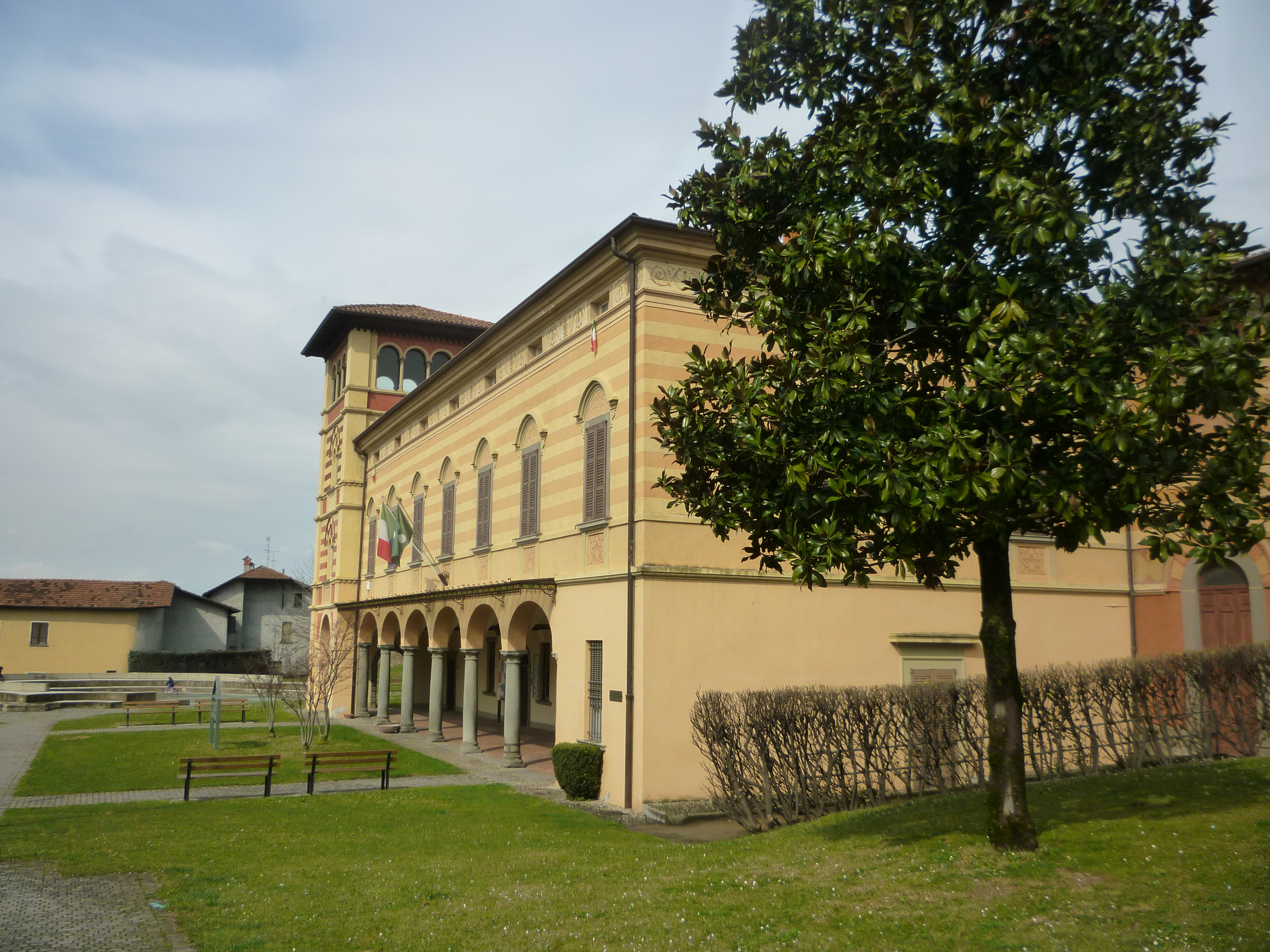
- Erbusco

- Location within Italy Location within Lombardy
- Coordinates: 45°36′N 9°58′E
- Country: Italy
- Region: Lombardy
- Province: Province of Brescia (BS)
- Frazioni: Lovera, Pedergnano, Spina, Villa, Zocco

Area
  - Total: 16 km^{2} (6.2 sq mi)

Population (31 December 2011)
  - Total: 8,743
  - Density: 550/km^{2} (1,400/sq mi)
- Demonym: Erbuschesi
- Time zone: UTC+1 (CET)
  - Summer (DST): UTC+2 (CEST)
- Postal code: 25030
- Dialing code: 030
- Patron saint: San Bonifacio
- Website: Official website

Erbusco (Brescian: Erbösch) is a comune in the province of Brescia, in Lombardy.
