= Gussago =

Gussago Gösàch
- Comune
- Comune di Gussago
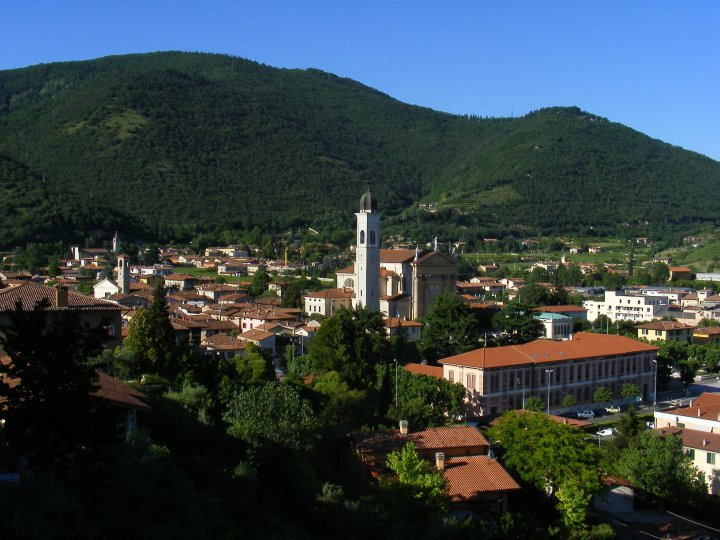
- Panorama of Gussago

- Location within Italy Location within Lombardy
- Coordinates: 45°36′N 10°9′E
- Country: Italy
- Region: Lombardy
- Province: Brescia (BS)
- Frazioni: Barco, Casaglio, Civine, Croce, Mandolossa, Navezze, Piazza, Piedeldosso, Ronco, Sale di Gussago, Villa

Government
  - Mayor: Bruno Marchina (Civic List)

Area
  - Total: 25 km^{2} (9.7 sq mi)
- Elevation: 185 m (607 ft)

Population (2011)
  - Total: 16,891
  - Density: 680/km^{2} (1,700/sq mi)
- Demonym: Gussaghesi
- Time zone: UTC+1 (CET)
  - Summer (DST): UTC+2 (CEST)
- Postal code: 25064
- Dialing code: 030
- ISTAT code: 017081
- Patron saint: Santa Maria Assunta
- Saint day: 15 August
- Website: Official website

Gussago (Brescian: Gösàch) is a town and comune in the province of Brescia, in Lombardy. The town is situated in Franciacorta, an area known for its precious wines. There are also many other cookery specialities, as spiedo (where meat such as pork, beef, chicken and rabbit is skewered with potato slices and sage leaves), meat products and wines.

The most important monument is Santissima, an old cloister situated on the summit of Barbisone Hill. The patroness Saint of Gussago is St. Mary.

== Twin towns ==
Gussago is twinned with:

- Aliap, South Sudan, since 2005
