= Torlino Vimercati =

- Comune
- Comune di Torlino Vimercati
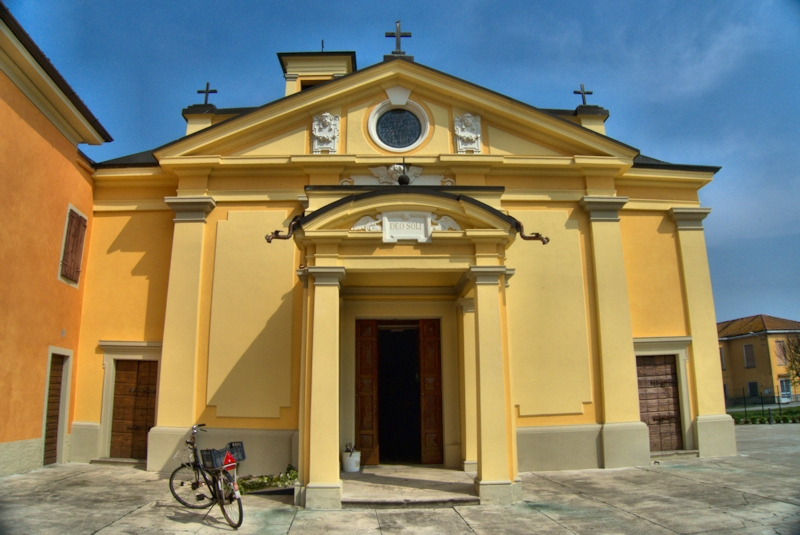

- Location within Italy Location within Lombardy
- Coordinates: 45°25′N 9°36′E
- Country: Italy
- Region: Lombardy
- Province: Cremona (CR)
- Frazioni: Azzano

Government
  - Mayor: Giuseppe Remigio Figoni

Area
  - Total: 5.7 km^{2} (2.2 sq mi)
- Elevation: 88 m (289 ft)

Population (31 December 2015)
  - Total: 469
  - Density: 82/km^{2} (210/sq mi)
- Demonym: Torlinesi
- Time zone: UTC+1 (CET)
  - Summer (DST): UTC+2 (CEST)
- Postal code: 26017
- Dialing code: 0373
- Website: Official website

Torlino Vimercati (Cremasco: Turlì) is a comune (municipality) in the Province of Cremona in the Italian region Lombardy, located about 35 kilometres (22 mi) east of Milan and about 45 kilometres (28 mi) northwest of Cremona.

Torlino Vimercati borders the following municipalities: Agnadello, Capralba, Palazzo Pignano, Pieranica, Quintano, Trescore Cremasco, Vailate.
