= Pieve d'Olmi =

- Comune
- Comune di Pieve d'Olmi
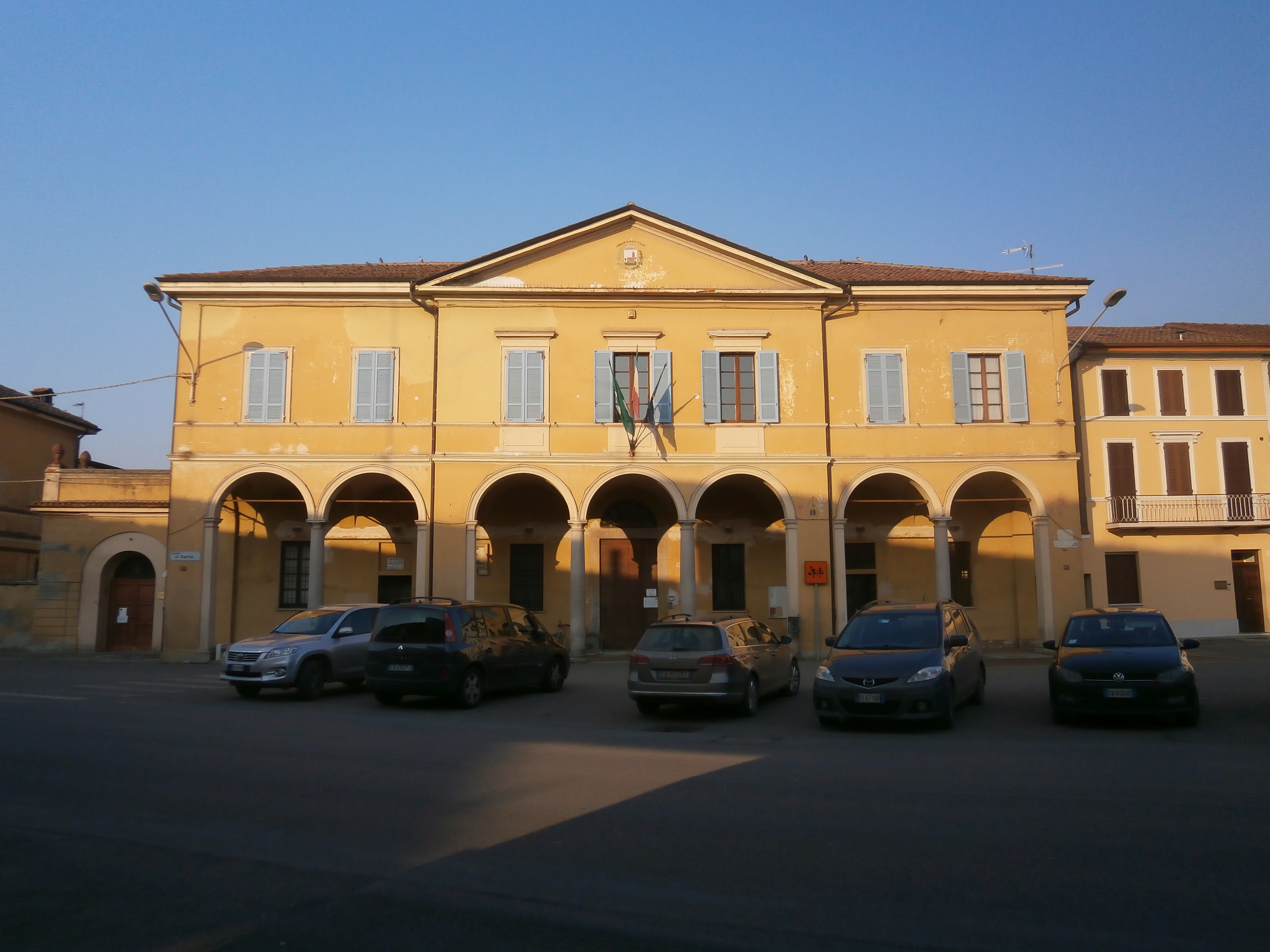

- Location within Italy Location within Lombardy
- Coordinates: 45°5′N 10°7′E
- Country: Italy
- Region: Lombardy
- Province: Province of Cremona (CR)

Government
  - Mayor: Attilio Paolo Zabert

Area
  - Total: 19.4 km^{2} (7.5 sq mi)
- Elevation: 36 m (118 ft)

Population (28 February 2017)
  - Total: 1,291
  - Density: 66.5/km^{2} (172/sq mi)
- Time zone: UTC+1 (CET)
  - Summer (DST): UTC+2 (CEST)
- Postal code: 26040
- Dialing code: 0372

Pieve d'Olmi (Cremunés: La Piéev) is a comune (municipality) in the Province of Cremona in the Italian region Lombardy, located about 90 kilometres (56 mi) southeast of Milan and about 9 kilometres (6 mi) southeast of Cremona.

Pieve d'Olmi borders the following municipalities: Bonemerse, Malagnino, San Daniele Po, Sospiro, Stagno Lombardo, Polesine Zibello.
