= Malagnino =

Malagnino Malagnéen (Lombard)
- Comune
- Comune di Malagnino
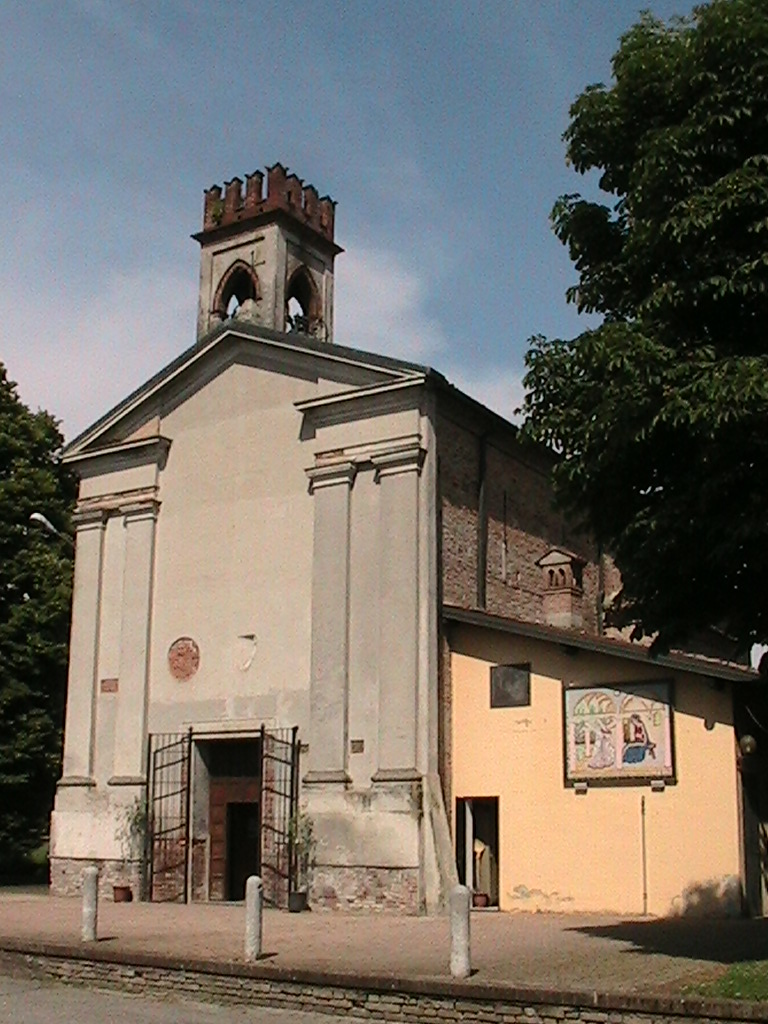

- Location within Italy Location within Lombardy
- Coordinates: 45°8′N 10°7′E
- Country: Italy
- Region: Lombardy
- Province: Cremona (CR)

Government
  - Mayor: Carla Cribiù

Area
  - Total: 10.82 km^{2} (4.18 sq mi)
- Elevation: 43 m (141 ft)

Population (28 February 2017)
  - Total: 1,703
  - Density: 157.4/km^{2} (407.6/sq mi)
- Demonym: Malagninesi
- Time zone: UTC+1 (CET)
  - Summer (DST): UTC+2 (CEST)
- Postal code: 26030
- Dialing code: 0372
- Website: Official website

Malagnino (Cremunés: Malagnéen) is a comune (municipality) in the Province of Cremona in the Italian region Lombardy, located about 80 kilometres (50 mi) southeast of Milan and about 7 kilometres (4 mi) east of Cremona.

Malagnino borders the following municipalities: Bonemerse, Cremona, Gadesco-Pieve Delmona, Pieve d'Olmi, Sospiro, Vescovato.
