= Grontardo =

Grontardo Gruntàard (Lombard)
- Comune
- Comune di Grontardo
- Coat of arms

- Location within Italy Location within Lombardy
- Coordinates: 45°12′N 10°9′E
- Country: Italy
- Region: Lombardy
- Province: Cremona (CR)

Government
  - Mayor: Santo Sparacino

Area
  - Total: 12.26 km^{2} (4.73 sq mi)
- Elevation: 46 m (151 ft)

Population (31 August 2017)
  - Total: 1,490
  - Density: 122/km^{2} (315/sq mi)
- Demonym: Grontardesi
- Time zone: UTC+1 (CET)
  - Summer (DST): UTC+2 (CEST)
- Postal code: 26044
- Dialing code: 0372
- Website: Official website

Grontardo (Cremunés: Gruntàard) is a comune (municipality) in the Province of Cremona in the Italian region Lombardy, located about 80 kilometres (50 mi) southeast of Milan and about 12 kilometres (7 mi) northeast of Cremona.

The town has a parish church dedicated to San Basilio.

Grontardo borders the following municipalities: Corte de' Frati, Gabbioneta-Binanuova, Gadesco-Pieve Delmona, Persico Dosimo, Pescarolo ed Uniti, Scandolara Ripa d'Oglio, Vescovato.
