= Capralba =

Capralba Cavralba (Lombard)
- Comune
- Comune di Capralba
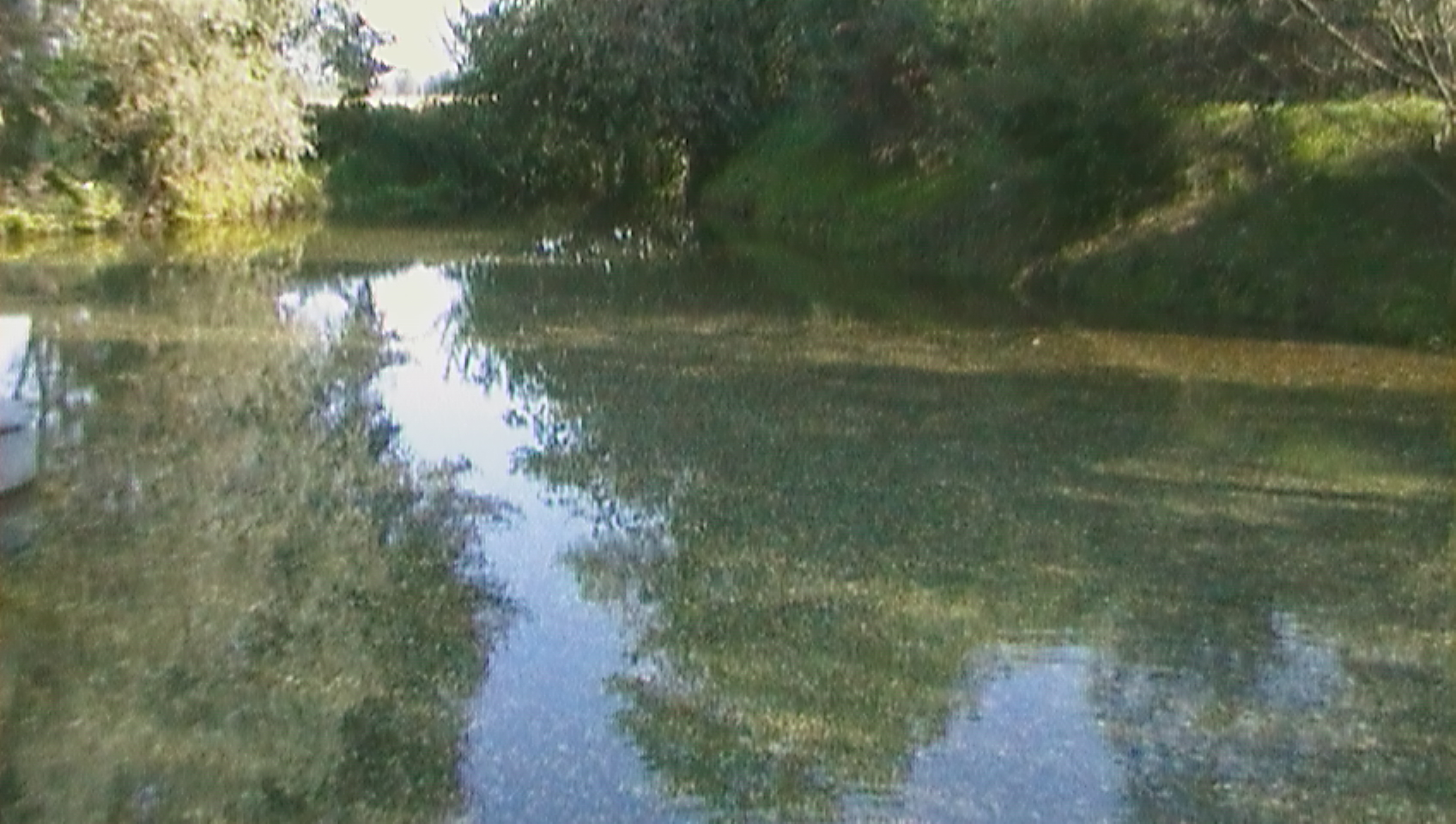
- A spring of water in Capralba

- Location within Italy Location within Lombardy
- Coordinates: 45°27′N 9°39′E
- Country: Italy
- Region: Lombardy
- Province: Cremona (CR)

Government
  - Mayor: Gian Carlo Soldati

Area
  - Total: 13.45 km^{2} (5.19 sq mi)
- Elevation: 93 m (305 ft)

Population (28 February 2017)
  - Total: 2,346
  - Density: 174.4/km^{2} (451.8/sq mi)
- Time zone: UTC+1 (CET)
  - Summer (DST): UTC+2 (CEST)
- Postal code: 26010
- Dialing code: 0373
- Patron saint: 30 November
- Website: Official website

Capralba (Cremish: Cavralba) is a comune (municipality) in the Province of Cremona in the Italian region Lombardy, located about 40 kilometres (25 mi) east of Milan and about 45 kilometres (28 mi) northwest of Cremona.

Capralba borders the following municipalities: Campagnola Cremasca, Caravaggio, Casaletto Vaprio, Misano di Gera d'Adda, Pieranica, Quintano, Sergnano, Torlino Vimercati, Vailate.

== Transportation ==
Capralba has a railway station on the Treviglio–Cremona line.
