= San Daniele Po =

- Comune
- Comune di San Daniele Po
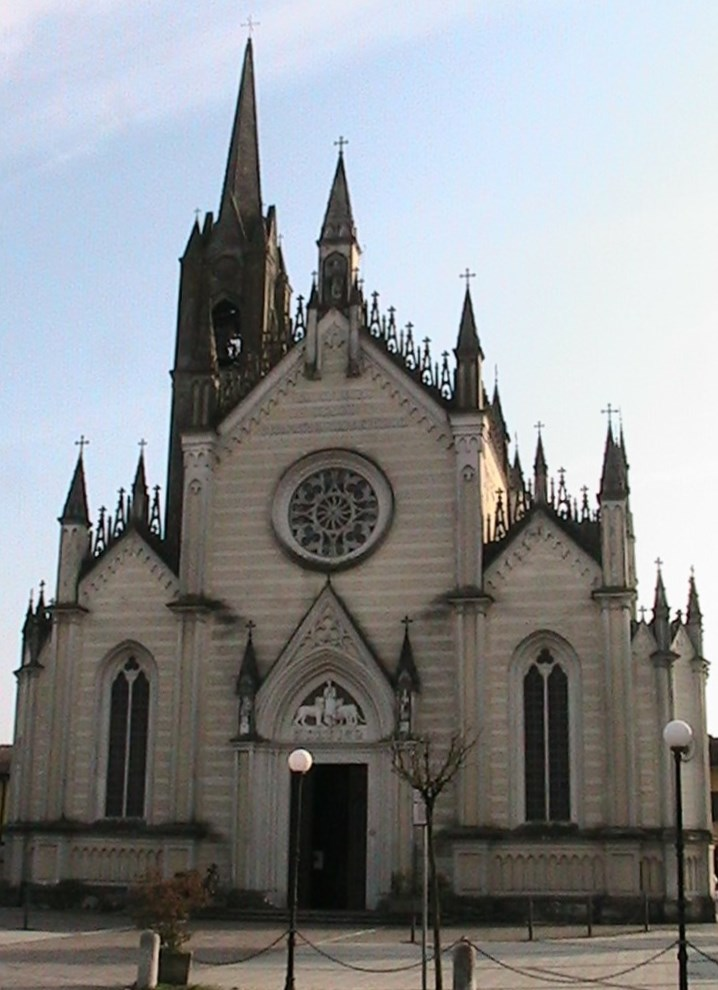
- Parish church.

- Location within Italy Location within Lombardy
- Coordinates: 45°4′N 10°11′E
- Country: Italy
- Region: Lombardy
- Province: Cremona (CR)
- Frazioni: Isola Pescaroli, Sommo con Porto, Margherita

Government
  - Mayor: Davide Persico

Area
  - Total: 22.69 km^{2} (8.76 sq mi)
- Elevation: 33 m (108 ft)

Population (28 February 2017)
  - Total: 1,371
  - Density: 60.42/km^{2} (156.5/sq mi)
- Demonym: Sandanielesi
- Time zone: UTC+1 (CET)
  - Summer (DST): UTC+2 (CEST)
- Postal code: 26046
- Dialing code: 0372
- Website: Official website

San Daniele Po (Cremunés: San Daniel) is a comune in the Province of Cremona in the Italian region Lombardy, located about 90 kilometres (56 mi) southeast of Milan and about 14 kilometres (9 mi) southeast of Cremona.

San Daniele Po borders the following municipalities: Cella Dati, Motta Baluffi, Pieve d'Olmi, Polesine Zibello, Roccabianca, Sospiro.
