= Gerre de' Caprioli =

- Comune
- Comune di Gerre de' Caprioli
- Location within Italy Location within Lombardy
- Coordinates: 45°5′N 10°3′E
- Country: Italy
- Region: Lombardy
- Province: Cremona (CR)

Government
  - Mayor: Michel Marchi

Area
  - Total: 8.1 km^{2} (3.1 sq mi)
- Elevation: 37 m (121 ft)

Population (31 August 3017)
  - Total: 1,334
  - Density: 160/km^{2} (430/sq mi)
- Demonym: Gerrini
- Time zone: UTC+1 (CET)
  - Summer (DST): UTC+2 (CEST)
- Postal code: 26040
- Dialing code: 0372
- Website: Official website

Gerre de' Caprioli (Cremunés: Le Gere or Li Geri) is a comune (municipality) in the Province of Cremona in the Italian region Lombardy, located about 80 kilometres (50 mi) southeast of Milan and about 6 kilometres (4 mi) south of Cremona.

Gerre de' Caprioli borders the following municipalities: Castelvetro Piacentino, Cremona, Stagno Lombardo.
