= Vescovato, Lombardy =

Vescovato Vescuvàt (Lombard)
- Comune
- Comune di Vescovato
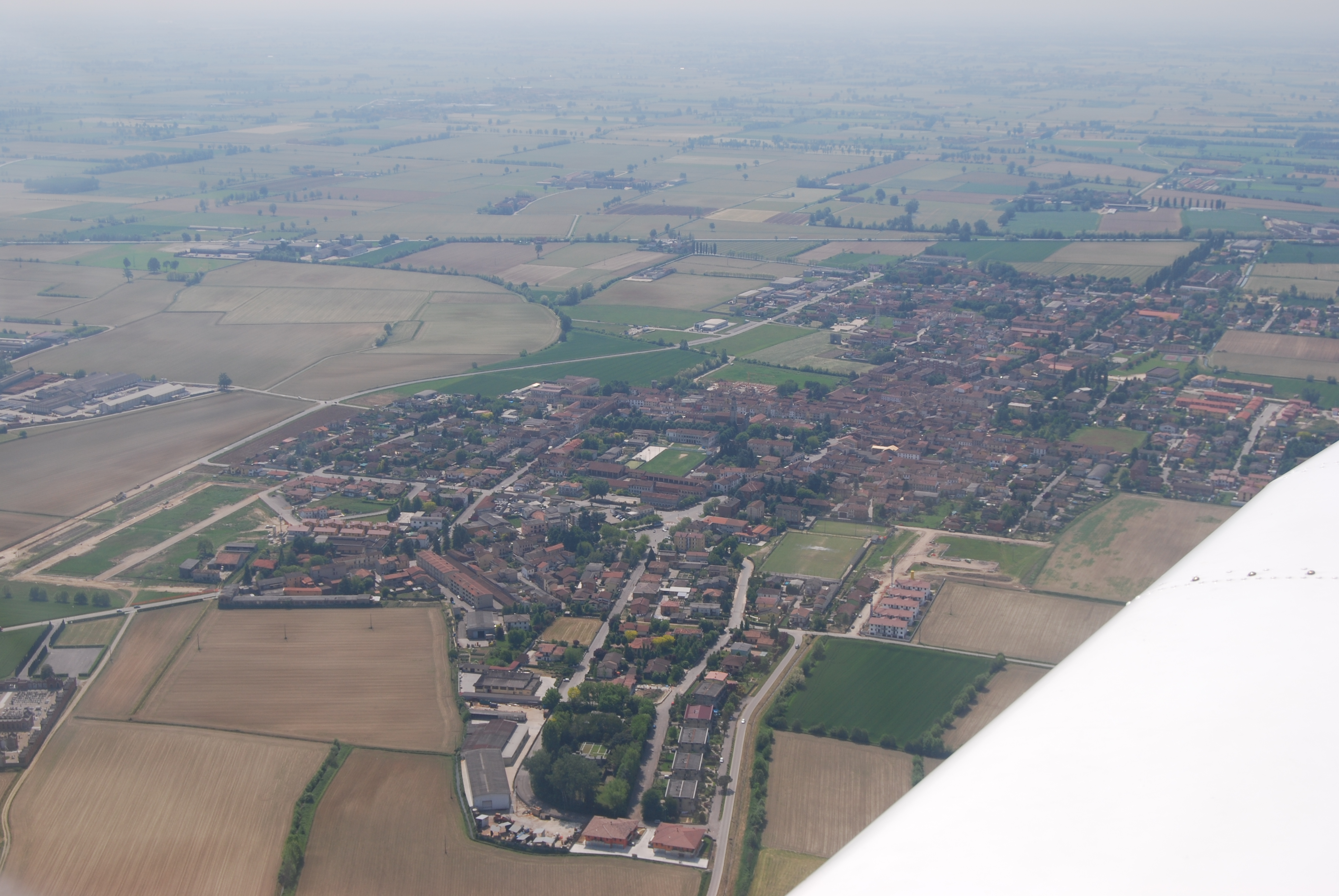

- Location within Italy Location within Lombardy
- Coordinates: 45°10′N 10°10′E
- Country: Italy
- Region: Lombardy
- Province: Cremona (CR)

Government
  - Mayor: Gianantonio Ireneo Conti

Area
  - Total: 17.4 km^{2} (6.7 sq mi)
- Elevation: 46 m (151 ft)

Population (30 September 2016)
  - Total: 3,903
  - Density: 224/km^{2} (581/sq mi)
- Demonym: Vescovatini
- Time zone: UTC+1 (CET)
  - Summer (DST): UTC+2 (CEST)
- Postal code: 26039
- Dialing code: 0372

Vescovato (Cremunés: Vescuvàt; locally Vescuaàt) is a comune (municipality) in the Province of Cremona in the Italian region Lombardy, located about 90 kilometres (56 mi) southeast of Milan and about 11 kilometres (7 mi) northeast of Cremona.

Vescovato borders the following municipalities: Cicognolo, Gadesco-Pieve Delmona, Grontardo, Malagnino, Pescarolo ed Uniti, Pieve San Giacomo, Sospiro.
