= Dati (disambiguation) =

Dati is a broad Israeli term for religious people, especially associated with Religious Zionism.

Dati may also refer to:

- Cella Dati, a comune (municipality) in northern Italy
- Leonardo Dati (1360–1425), Italian friar and humanist
- Rachida Dati (born 1965), French politician, lawyer and magistrate
- Tulad Ng Dati, an album released by the Philippine rock band The Dawn
- Datis, an admiral who served in the Persian Empire
