= Sospiro =

Sospiro Suspìir (Lombard)
- Comune
- Comune di Sospiro
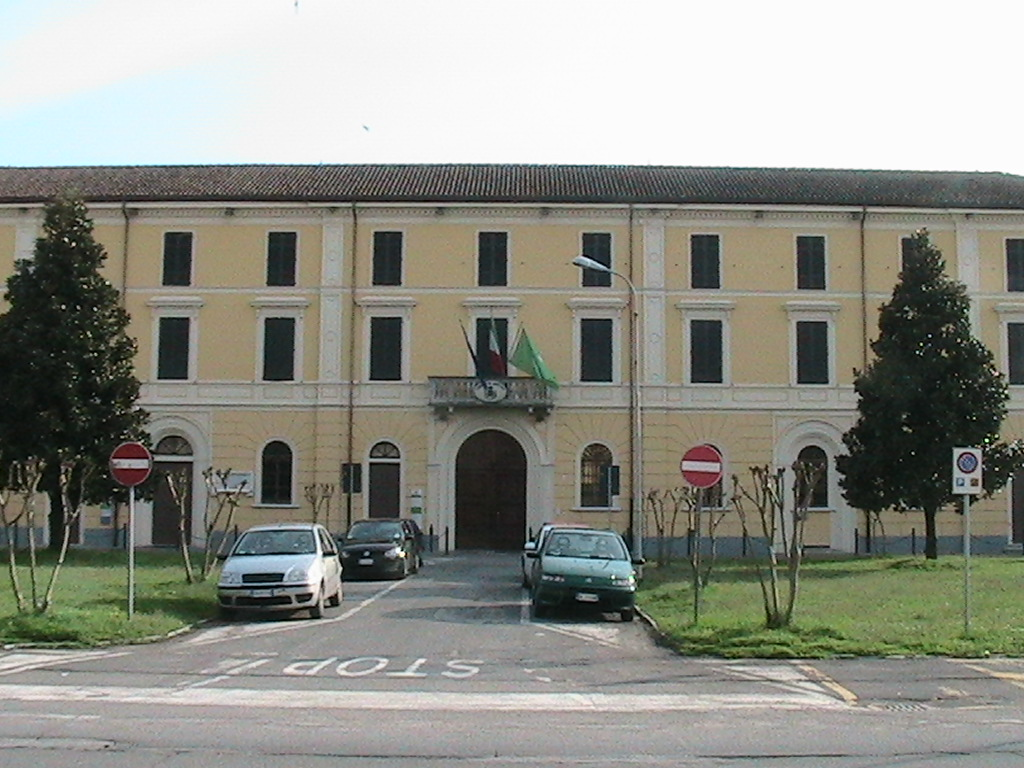
- Town hall

- Location within Italy Location within Lombardy
- Coordinates: 45°6′N 10°9′E
- Country: Italy
- Region: Lombardy
- Province: Cremona (CR)
- Frazioni: Longardore, S.Salvatore, Tidolo

Government
  - Mayor: Paolo Abruzzi

Area
  - Total: 18.96 km^{2} (7.32 sq mi)
- Elevation: 36 m (118 ft)

Population (28 February 2017)
  - Total: 3,094
  - Density: 163.2/km^{2} (422.6/sq mi)
- Demonym: Sospiresi
- Time zone: UTC+1 (CET)
  - Summer (DST): UTC+2 (CEST)
- Postal code: 26048
- Dialing code: 0372
- Patron saint: St. Sirus
- Website: Official website

Sospiro (Cremunés: Suspìir) is a comune (municipality) in the Province of Cremona in the Italian region Lombardy, located about 90 kilometres (56 mi) southeast of Milan and about 10 kilometres (6 mi) southeast of Cremona.

Sospiro borders the following municipalities: Cella Dati, Malagnino, Pieve d'Olmi, Pieve San Giacomo, San Daniele Po, Vescovato.
