= Quintano =

Quintano Quintà (Lombard)
- Comune
- Comune di Quintano
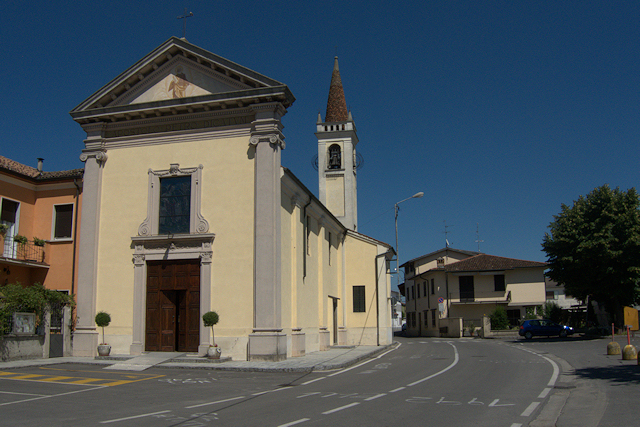

- Location within Italy Location within Lombardy
- Coordinates: 45°25′N 9°37′E
- Country: Italy
- Region: Lombardy
- Province: Cremona (CR)

Government
  - Mayor: Emi Zecchini

Area
  - Total: 2.86 km^{2} (1.10 sq mi)
- Elevation: 91 m (299 ft)

Population (31 December 2013)
  - Total: 948
  - Density: 331/km^{2} (858/sq mi)
- Demonym: Quintanesi
- Time zone: UTC+1 (CET)
  - Summer (DST): UTC+2 (CEST)
- Postal code: 26027
- Dialing code: 0373
- Website: Official website

Quintano (Cremasco: Quintà) is a comune (municipality) in the Province of Cremona in the Italian region Lombardy, located about 35 km (22 mi) east of Milan and about 45 km (28 mi) northwest of Cremona.

Quintano borders the following municipalities: Capralba, Casaletto Vaprio, Pieranica, Torlino Vimercati, Trescore Cremasco.
