= Stagno Lombardo =

- Comune
- Comune di Stagno Lombardo
- Location within Italy Location within Lombardy
- Coordinates: 45°4′N 10°5′E
- Country: Italy
- Region: Lombardy
- Province: Cremona (CR)
- Frazioni: Brancere, Forcello, Straconcolo

Government
  - Mayor: Roberto Mariani

Area
  - Total: 39.9 km^{2} (15.4 sq mi)
- Elevation: 36 m (118 ft)

Population (31 December 2010)
  - Total: 1,544
  - Density: 38.7/km^{2} (100/sq mi)
- Demonym: Stagnaroli
- Time zone: UTC+1 (CET)
  - Summer (DST): UTC+2 (CEST)
- Postal code: 26049
- Dialing code: 0372
- Website: Official website

Stagno Lombardo (Cremunés: Stàgn) is a comune (municipality) in the Province of Cremona in the Italian region Lombardy, located about 80 kilometres (50 mi) southeast of Milan and about 8 kilometres (5 mi) southeast of Cremona.

Stagno Lombardo borders the following municipalities: Bonemerse, Castelvetro Piacentino, Cremona, Gerre de' Caprioli, Pieve d'Olmi, Polesine Zibello, Villanova sull'Arda.
