= Scandolara Ravara =

- Comune
- Comune di Scandolara Ravara
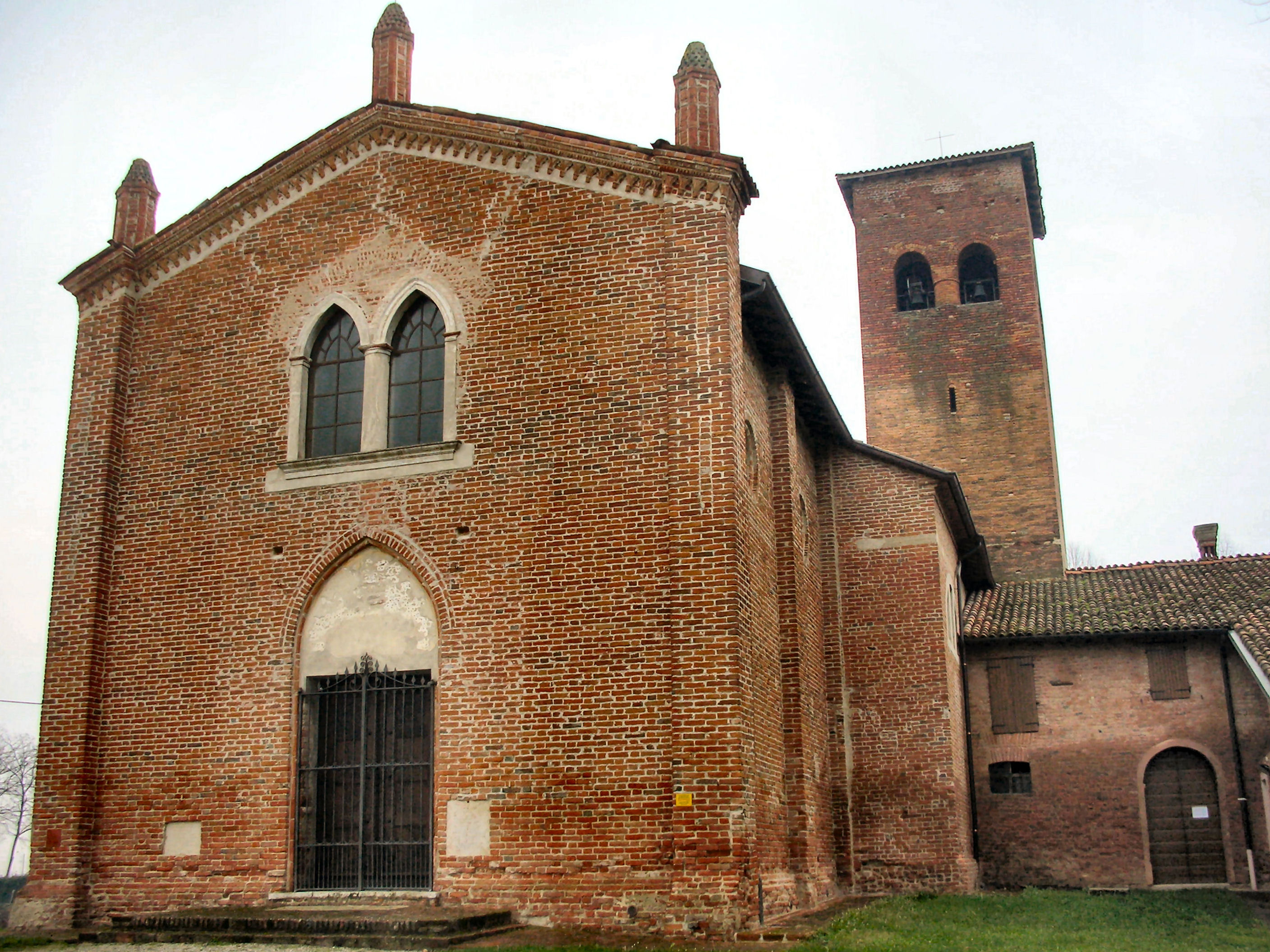

- Coat of arms

- Location within Italy Location within Lombardy
- Coordinates: 45°5′N 10°17′E
- Country: Italy
- Region: Lombardy
- Province: Cremona (CR)
- Frazioni: Castelponzone

Government
  - Mayor: Velleda Rivaroli

Area
  - Total: 17.08 km^{2} (6.59 sq mi)
- Elevation: 30 m (98 ft)

Population (28 February 2017)
  - Total: 1,380
  - Density: 80.8/km^{2} (209/sq mi)
- Demonym: Scandarolesi
- Time zone: UTC+1 (CET)
  - Summer (DST): UTC+2 (CEST)
- Postal code: 86040
- Dialing code: 0375
- Website: Official website

Scandolara Ravara (Cremunés: Scandulèra) is a comune (municipality) in the Province of Cremona in the Italian region Lombardy, located about 100 kilometres (62 mi) southeast of Milan and about 20 kilometres (12 mi) southeast of Cremona.

Scandolara Ravara borders the following municipalities: Cingia de' Botti, Gussola, Motta Baluffi, San Martino del Lago, Solarolo Rainerio, Torricella del Pizzo. Its frazione of Castelponzone is one of I Borghi più belli d'Italia ("The most beautiful villages of Italy").

== Main sights ==
- Altar of Ilumvius, the relic of Roman funerary altar
- Old Church (Chiesa Vecchia)
