= Gussola =

Gussola La Ghisööla (Emilian) La Ghisóola (Lombard)
- Comune
- Comune di Gussola
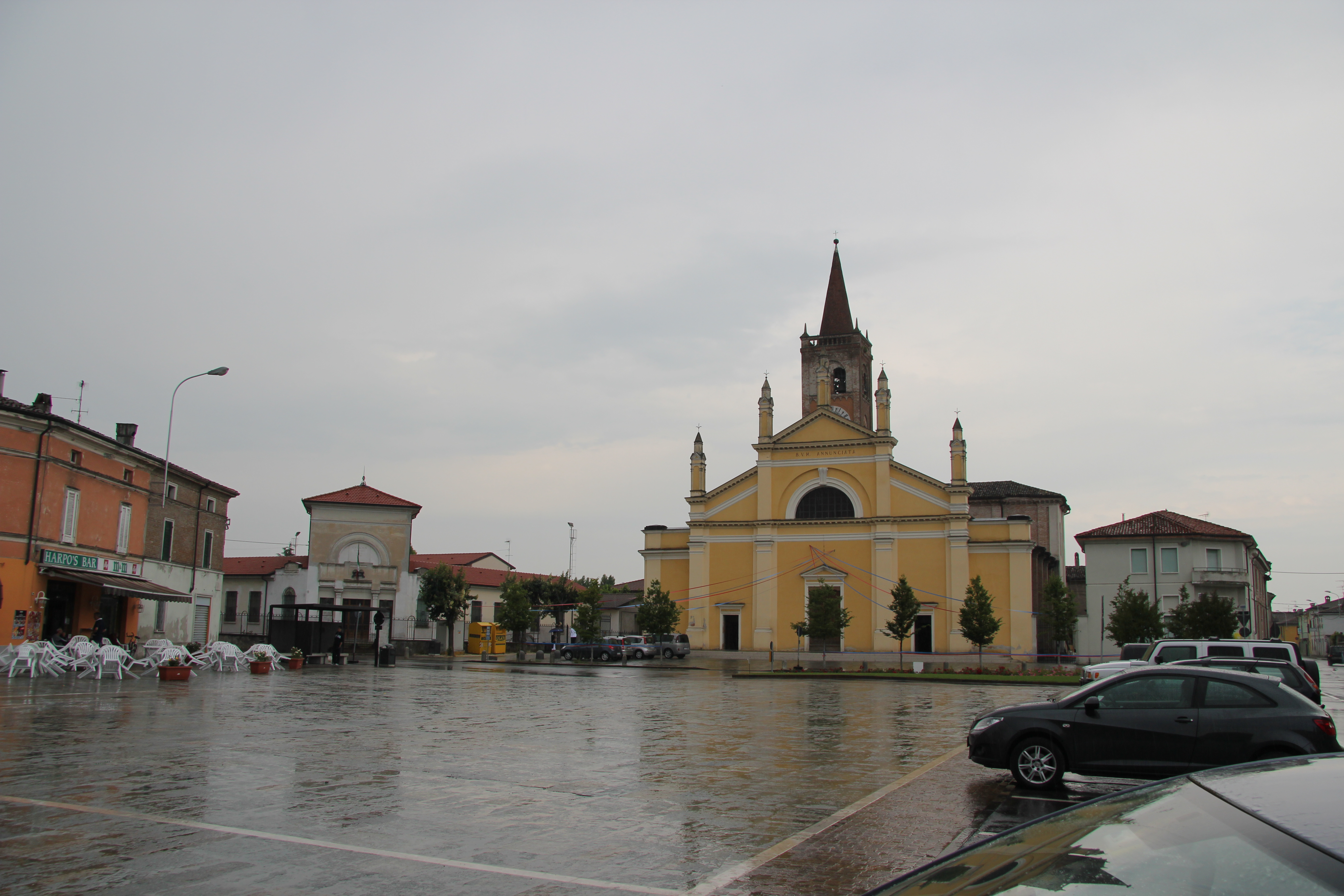

- Coat of arms

- Location within Italy Location within Lombardy
- Coordinates: 45°1′N 10°21′E
- Country: Italy
- Region: Lombardy
- Province: Cremona (CR)

Government
  - Mayor: Stefano Belli Franzini

Area
  - Total: 25.3 km^{2} (9.8 sq mi)
- Elevation: 27 m (89 ft)

Population (31 August 2017)
  - Total: 31 August 2,017
  - Density: 1.2/km^{2} (3.2/sq mi)
- Demonym: Gussolesi
- Time zone: UTC+1 (CET)
  - Summer (DST): UTC+2 (CEST)
- Postal code: 26040
- Dialing code: 0375
- Website: Official website

Gussola (Casalasco-Viadanese: La Ghisööla; Cremunés: Ghisóola) is a comune (municipality) in the Province of Cremona in the Italian region Lombardy, located about 110 kilometres (68 mi) southeast of Milan and about 30 kilometres (19 mi) southeast of Cremona.

Gussola borders the following municipalities: Colorno, Martignana di Po, San Giovanni in Croce, Scandolara Ravara, Sissa Trecasali, Solarolo Rainerio, Torricella del Pizzo.
