= Province of Cremona =

Province of Italy

Coordinates: 45°8′N 10°2′E

Province of Cremona Provincia di Cremona (Italian) Pruvìncia de Cremùna (Lombard) Pruvìncia ad Cramòna (Emilian)
- Province
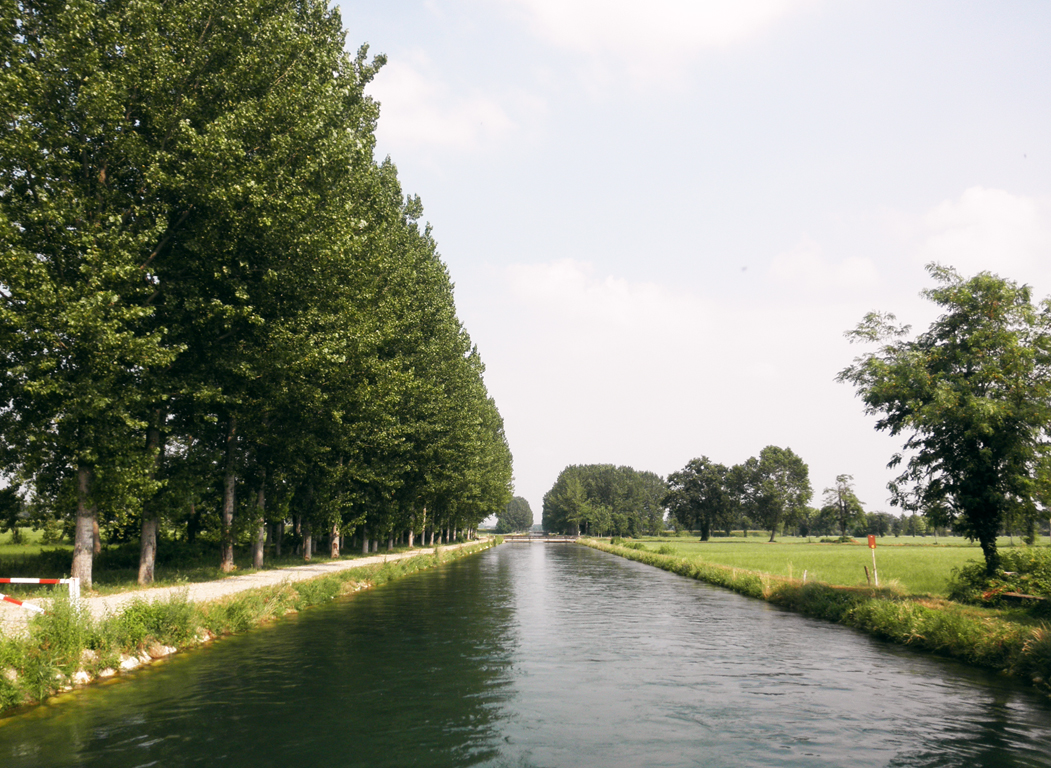
- Typical canal in the countryside of Pandino

- Flag Coat of arms

- Location of the Province of Cremona in Italy
- Country: Italy
- Region: Lombardy
- Capital(s): Cremona
- Municipalities: 113

Government
  - President: Roberto Mariani (PD)

Area
  - Total: 1,770.46 km^{2} (683.58 sq mi)

Population (2026)
  - Total: 355,134
  - Density: 200.589/km^{2} (519.522/sq mi)

GDP
  - Total: €10.294 billion (2015)
  - Per capita: €28,513 (2015)
- Time zone: UTC+1 (CET)
  - Summer (DST): UTC+2 (CEST)
- Postal code: 26100, 26010-26049
- Telephone prefix: 0372, 0373, 0374, 0375, 0363
- Vehicle registration: CR
- ISTAT code: 019

The Province of Cremona (Italian: provincia di Cremona; Cremunés: pruvìncia de Cremùna; Cremish: pruìnsa de Cremùna; Casalasco-Viadanese: pruvìncia ad Cramòna) is a province in the region of Lombardy in Italy. Its capital city is Cremona.

The province occupies the central section of Padana Plain, so the whole territory is flat, without any mountains or hills, crossed by several rivers, such as the Serio and Adda, and artificial canals, most of which are used for irrigation.

It has a population of 355,134 in an area of 1,770.46 square kilometres (683.58 sq mi) across its 113 municipalities.

The river Po, which is the longest Italian river, is the natural boundary with the adjoining province of Piacenza, while the Oglio separates the province from Brescia.

== History ==
Lombardy has been inhabited since ancient times and Stone Age and Bronze Age rock drawings and artefacts have been found there. From the fifth century BC, Gallic tribes invaded and settled in the region, building several cities (including Milan) and ruling the land as far as the Adriatic Sea. From the third century BC the Romans expanded their sphere of influence into the area, and in 194 BC, the whole of what is now Lombardy became a Roman province called Gallia Cisalpina. The Romans overwhelmed the previous civilisations and Lombardy became one of the richest and best-developed areas in Italy. It was here in 313 AD that the Roman Emperor Constantine the Great issued the famous Edict of Milan that gave freedom of religion to all people in the Roman Empire.

Following the collapse of the Western Roman Empire, Lombardy was invaded by successive waves of tribes, the last of which was the Germanic Lombards in the late sixth century. Stability followed until 774 when the Frankish king Charlemagne conquered the area and annexed the Kingdom of the Lombards (most of northern and central Italy) to his empire.

== Geography ==
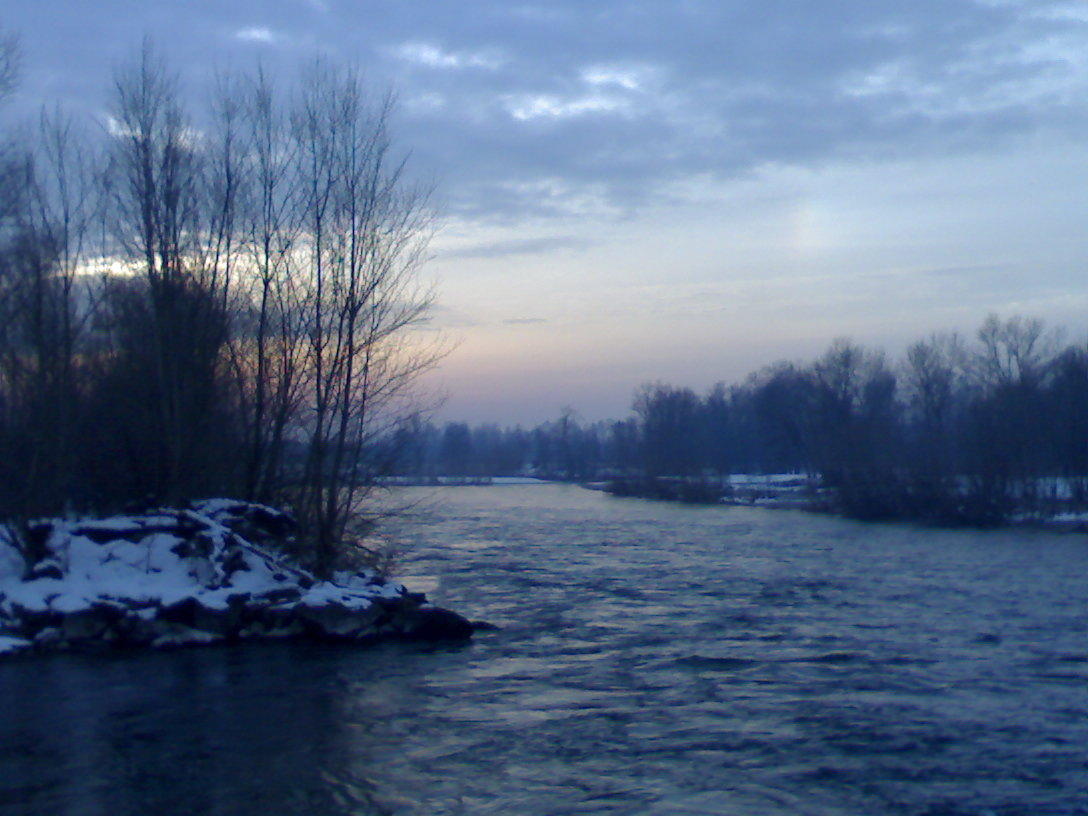
River Adda in winter

Le Bine natural reserve

The province of Cremona is a long, relatively narrow part of the Padana Plain in northern Italy, the outline of which is circumscribed by rivers. The province is orientated from northwest to southeast. To the west of the province lies the Province of Lodi, to the northwest lies the Province of Milan, to the north lies the Province of Bergamo, to the east lies the Province of Brescia, and to the southeast lies the Province of Mantua. The region of Emilia-Romagna lies to the south, Cremona abutting onto the Province of Reggio Emilia, the Province of Parma and the Province of Piacenza.

Several rivers flow across the Lombardy Plain to join the Po which runs along the southern border of the province. The Adda separates Cremona from the province of Lodi and the Oglio provides the border with the province of Mantua. Other rivers in the north of the province include the Serio and the Tormo, and the Mella makes up a short stretch of the border with the province of Brescia. These rivers are linked by a network of canals which have been in place since at least the sixteenth century and are largely used for irrigation. The Muzza Canal takes its water from the river Adda and irrigates the land between that river and the river Ticino, converting the plain into a fertile area with rich meadows and productive agricultural land.

The total area of the province is 600 square miles (1,600 km^{2}). Although the province is essentially flat, there are some undulations in the surface formed by the varying courses of the rivers over the millennia. For historical reasons, the province is subdivided into four rural districts, centred on Crema, Soresina, Cremona and Casalmaggiore. In the north, some watercourses emerge from the ground in the "line of springs", a phenomenon of the northern Lombardy Plain, where melt-water from the Alps flows underground through porous gravelly soils before being forced to the surface when it reaches impervious, clayey ground.

The climate is largely uniform throughout the province. The annual rainfall is about 750 mm (30 in) with October and November being the wettest months and February and July being the driest. The average temperature is 1.7 °C (35 °F) in January and 24.3 °C (76 °F) in July. There is often fog in winter, especially near the rivers.

== Government ==
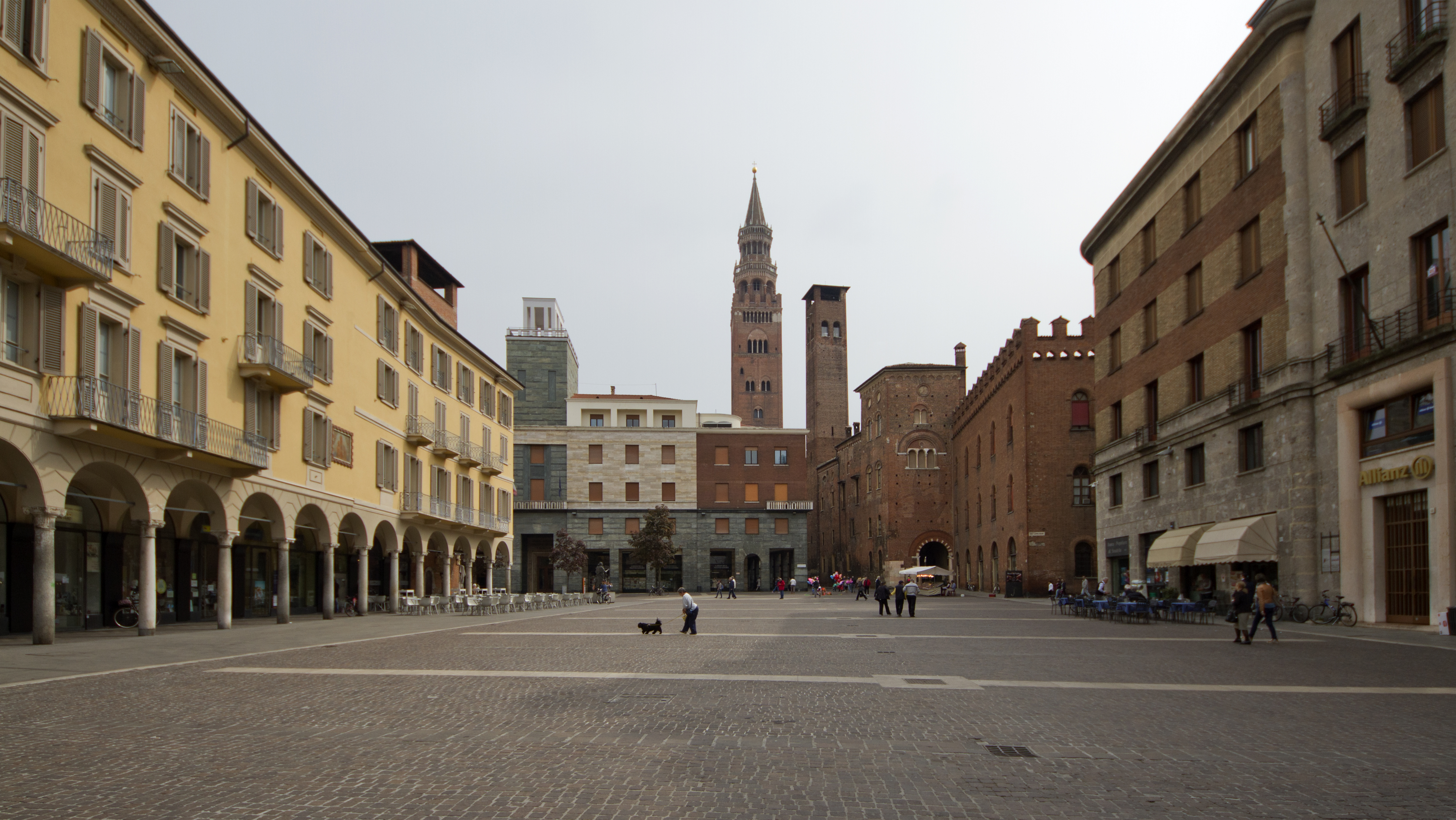

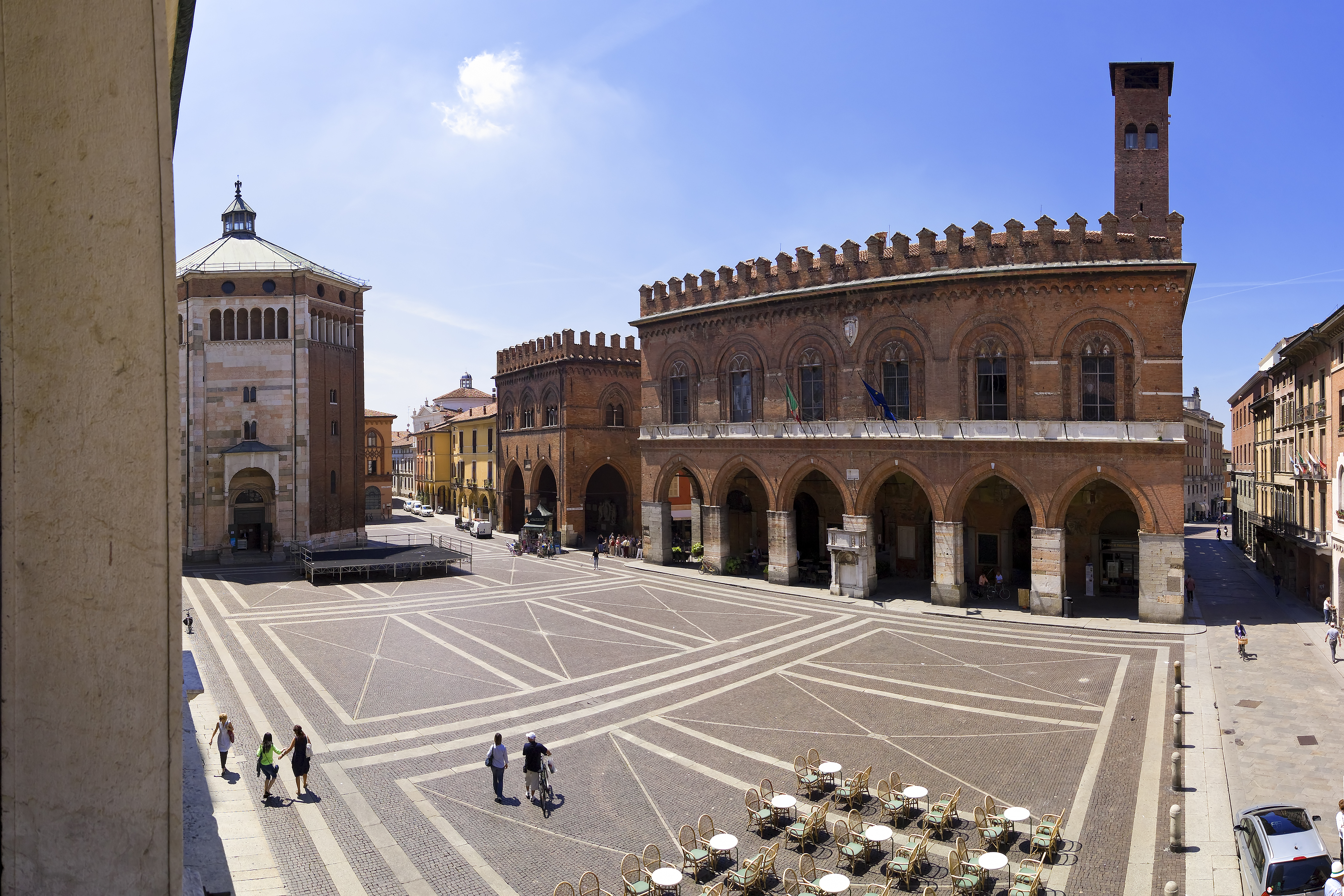
Cremona is the administrative centre of the province where all the provincial institutions are seated.

Map of the 113 municipalities of the province, with the capital Cremona in red

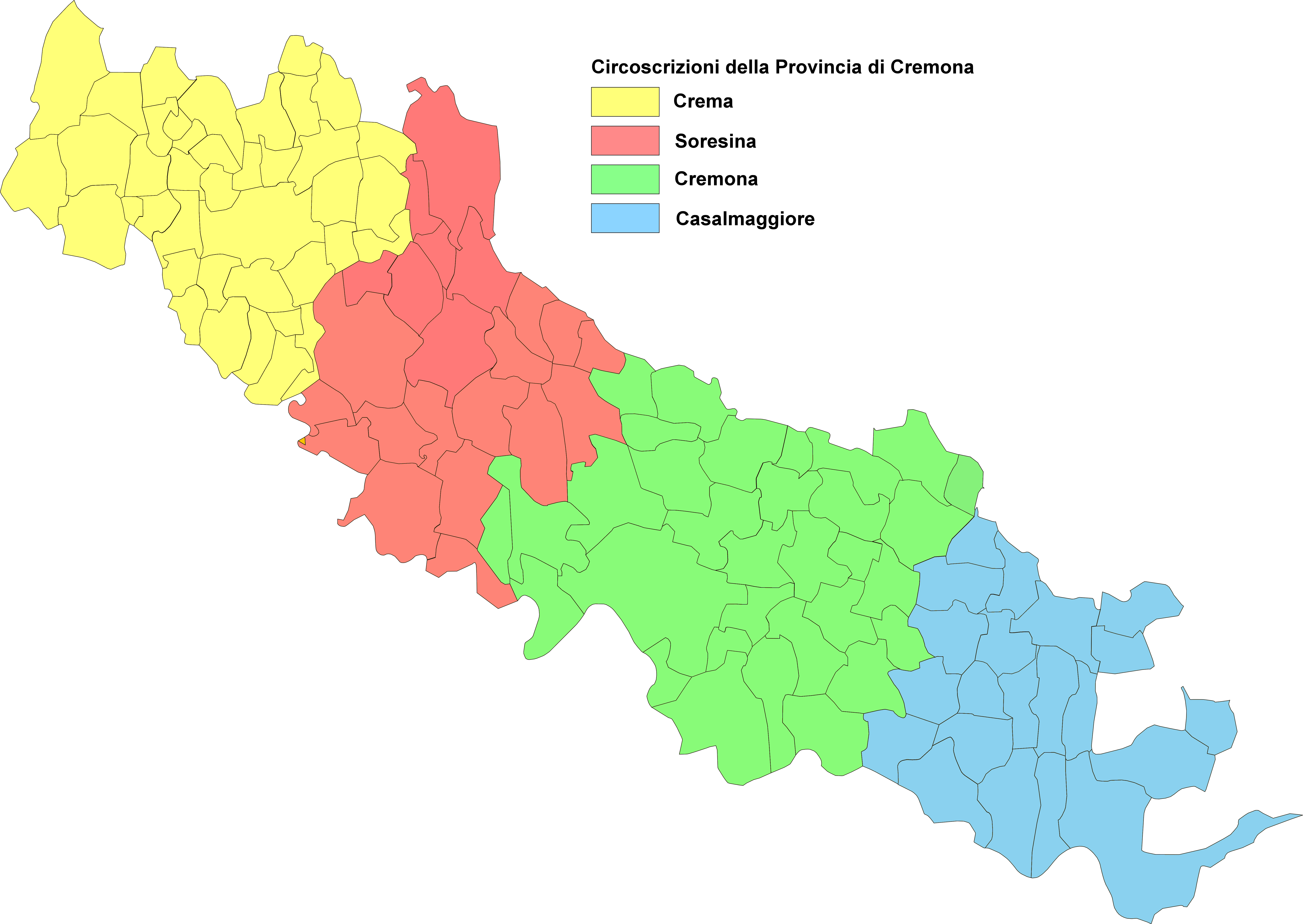
Map of the historical regions of the province

The Province of Cremona is an administrative body of intermediate level between a municipality (comune) and Lombardy region.

The three main functions devolved to the province of Cremona are:

- local planning and zoning;
- provision of local police and fire services;
- transportation regulation (car registration, maintenance of local roads, etc.).

As an administrative institution, the province of Cremona has its own elected bodies. From 1948 to 1995 the President of the province of Cremona was chosen by the members of the Provincial Council, elected every five years by citizens. From 1995 to 2014, under provisions of the 1993 local administration reform, the President of the Province was chosen by popular election, originally every four, then every five years.

In a 2005 ruling of the European Court of Justice, the comune of Cingia de' Botti's award of a concession contract for public gas distribution services was criticised, as the contract had been awarded to a company called Padania without a competitive procurement process, contrary to EU regulations. Padania was a public-sector company owned by the province and most of the provincial comunes, including Cingia de’ Botti, but also open, at least to some degree, to private part-ownership.

On 3 April 2014, the Italian Chamber of Deputies gave its final approval to Law n.56/2014 which involved the transformation of the Italian provinces into "institutional bodies of second level". According to the 2014 reform, each province is headed by a President (or Commissioner) assisted by a legislative body, the Provincial Council, and an executive body, the Provincial Executive. The President (Commissioner) and members of the Council are elected together by mayors and city councillors of each municipality of the province respectively every four and two years. The Executive is chaired by the President (Commissioner) who appoints other members, called assessori. Since 2015, the President (Commissioner) and other members of the Council do not receive a salary.

In each province, there is also a Prefect (prefetto), a representative of the central government who heads an agency called prefettura-ufficio territoriale del governo. The Questor (questore) is the head of the State Police (Polizia di Stato) in the province and his office is called questura. There is also a province's police force depending on local government, called provincial police (polizia provinciale).

=== List of presidents ===
This is a list of the Presidents of the Province since 1951:

| President | Term start | Term end | Party |
|---|---|---|---|
| Giuseppe Ghisalberti | 1951 | 1970 | DC |
| Martino Manfredi | 1970 | 1975 | DC |
| Franco Dolci | 1975 | 1980 | PCI |
| Renzo Rebecchi | 1980 | 1985 | DC |
| Secondo Piazza | 1985 | 1988 | DC |
| Vittorio Foderaro | 1988 | 1990 | DC |
| Gian Carlo Corada | 1990 | 1995 | PDS |
| Gian Carlo Corada | 8 May 1995 | 28 June 2004 | DS |
| Giuseppe Torchio | 28 June 2004 | 8 June 2009 | PD |
| Massimiliano Salini | 8 June 2009 | 21 July 2014 | PdL |
| Carlo Vezzini (Note: Mayor of Sesto ed Uniti. He ended his mayoral term in 2016 and consequently was obliged to resign from the office of President of the province.) | 13 October 2014 | 7 November 2016 | PD |
| Davide Viola (Note: Mayor of Gadesco-Pieve Delmona. He ended his mayoral term in 2019 and consequently was obliged to resign from the office of President of the province.) | 7 November 2016 | 26 August 2019 | PD |
| Paolo Signoroni (Note: Mayor of Dovera.) | 26 August 2019 | 30 September 2024 | PD |
| Roberto Mariani (Note: Mayor of Stagno Lombardo.) | 30 September 2024 | Incumbent | PD |

=== Municipalities ===
Map of the province's municipalities by population

The province has 113 municipalities:

- Acquanegra Cremonese
- Agnadello
- Annicco
- Azzanello
- Bagnolo Cremasco
- Bonemerse
- Bordolano
- Calvatone
- Camisano
- Campagnola Cremasca
- Capergnanica
- Cappella Cantone
- Cappella de' Picenardi
- Capralba
- Casalbuttano ed Uniti
- Casale Cremasco-Vidolasco
- Casaletto Ceredano
- Casaletto di Sopra
- Casaletto Vaprio
- Casalmaggiore
- Casalmorano
- Castel Gabbiano
- Casteldidone
- Castelleone
- Castelverde
- Castelvisconti
- Cella Dati
- Chieve
- Cicognolo
- Cingia de' Botti
- Corte de' Cortesi con Cignone
- Corte de' Frati
- Credera Rubbiano
- Crema
- Cremona
- Cremosano
- Crotta d'Adda
- Cumignano sul Naviglio
- Derovere
- Dovera
- Fiesco
- Formigara
- Gabbioneta-Binanuova
- Gadesco-Pieve Delmona
- Genivolta
- Gerre de' Caprioli
- Gombito
- Grontardo
- Grumello Cremonese ed Uniti
- Gussola
- Isola Dovarese
- Izano
- Madignano
- Malagnino
- Martignana di Po
- Monte Cremasco
- Montodine
- Moscazzano
- Motta Baluffi
- Offanengo
- Olmeneta
- Ostiano
- Paderno Ponchielli
- Palazzo Pignano
- Pandino
- Persico Dosimo
- Pescarolo ed Uniti
- Pessina Cremonese
- Piadena
- Pianengo
- Pieranica
- Pieve d'Olmi
- Pieve San Giacomo
- Pizzighettone
- Pozzaglio ed Uniti
- Quintano
- Ricengo
- Ripalta Arpina
- Ripalta Cremasca
- Ripalta Guerina
- Rivarolo del Re ed Uniti
- Rivolta d'Adda
- Robecco d'Oglio
- Romanengo
- Salvirola
- San Bassano
- San Daniele Po
- San Giovanni in Croce
- San Martino del Lago
- Scandolara Ravara
- Scandolara Ripa d'Oglio
- Sergnano
- Sesto ed Uniti
- Solarolo Rainerio
- Soncino
- Soresina
- Sospiro
- Spinadesco
- Spineda
- Spino d'Adda
- Stagno Lombardo
- Ticengo
- Torlino Vimercati
- Tornata
- Torre de' Picenardi
- Torricella del Pizzo
- Trescore Cremasco
- Trigolo
- Vaiano Cremasco
- Vailate
- Vescovato
- Volongo
- Voltido

==== Gallery ====
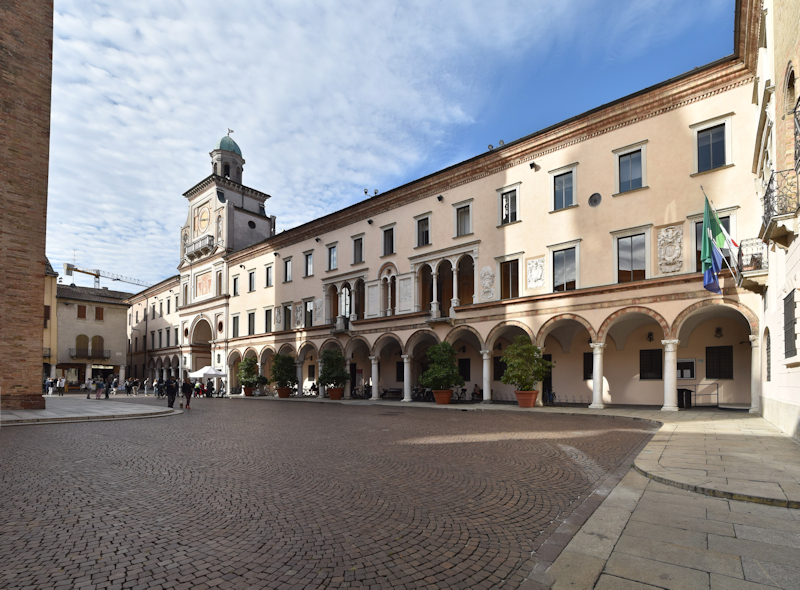
Crema

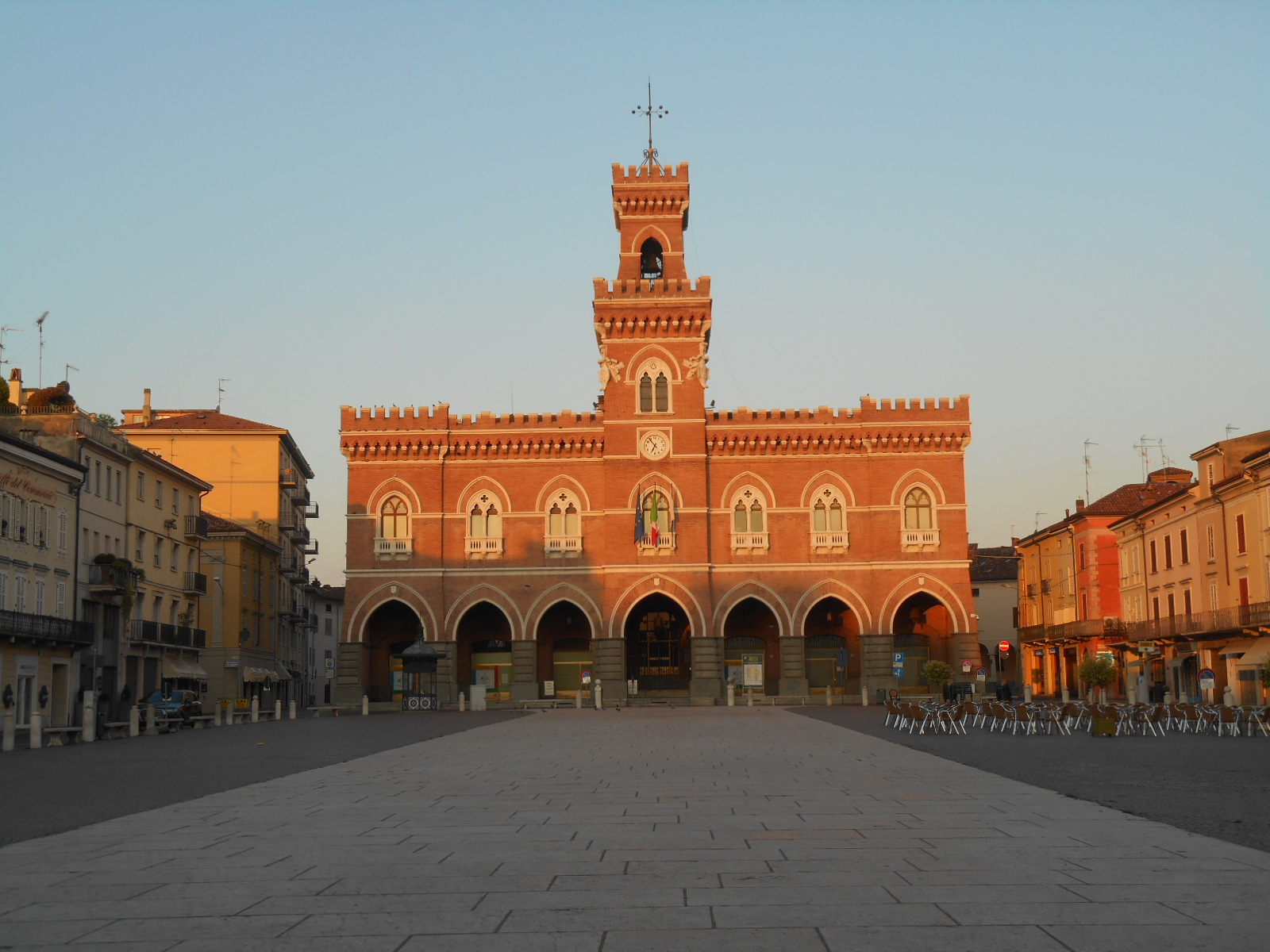
Casalmaggiore

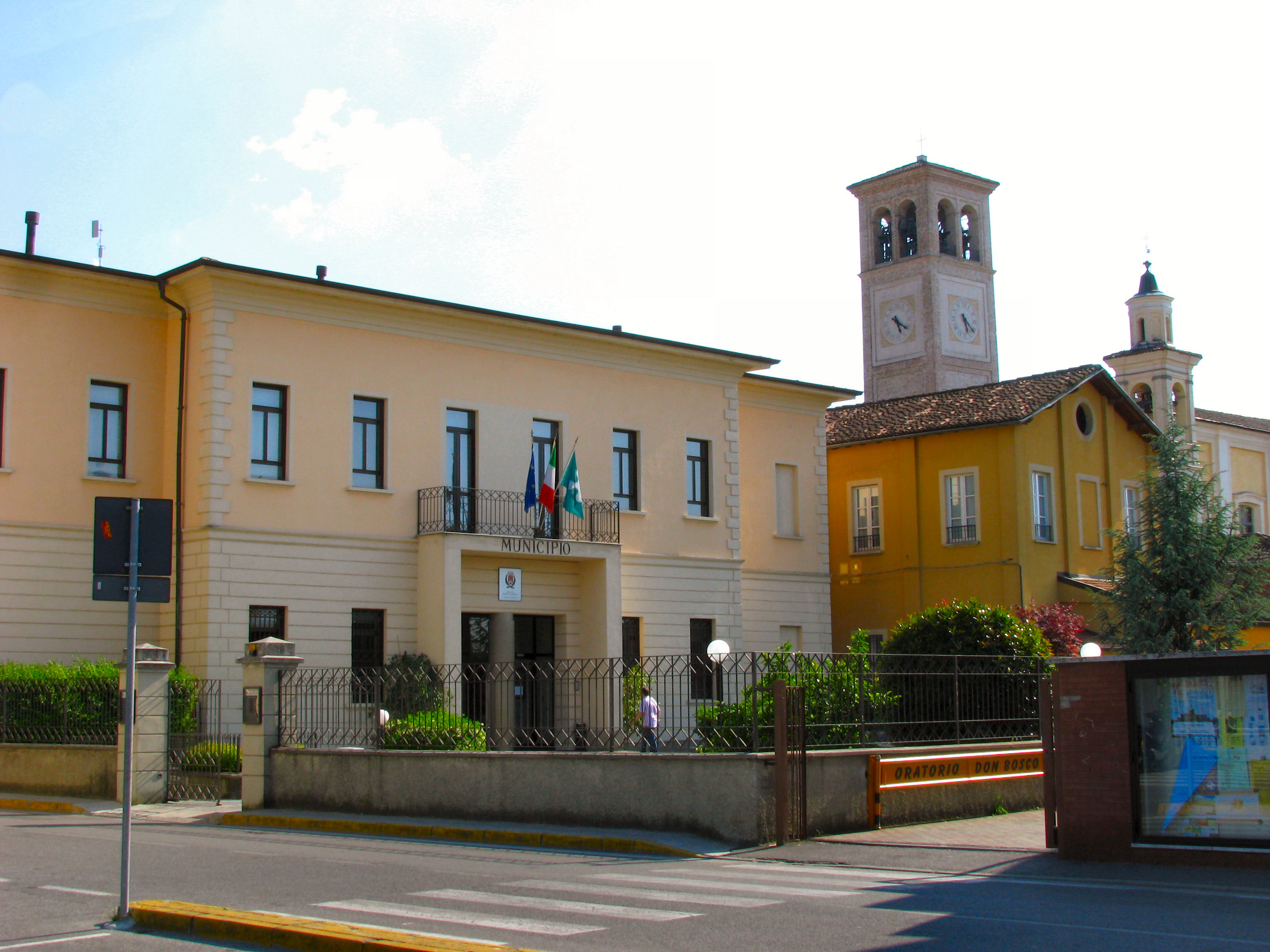
Bagnolo Cremasco

Cella Dati

Moscazzano

Piadena Drizzona

Spino d'Adda

Torre de' Picenardi

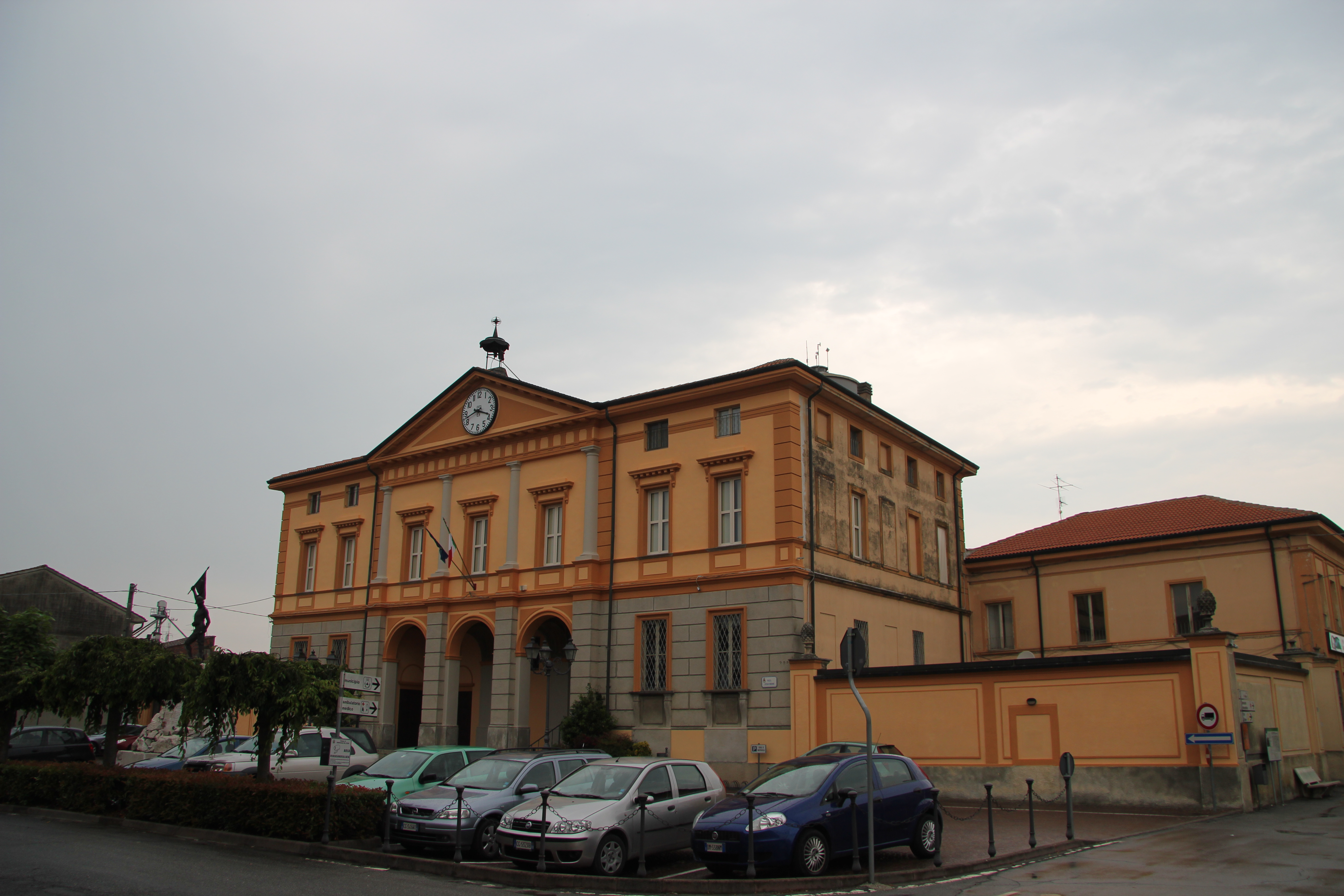
Torricella del Pizzo

Voltido

=== Municipal government ===
Below is a list of the municipal government in cities and towns with more than 15,000 inhabitants:

| Municipality | Mayor | Party | Executive | Term |
|---|---|---|---|---|
| Cremona | Andrea Virgilio | PD | PD • AVS | 2024–2029 |
| Crema | Fabio Bergamaschi | PD | PD • Ind | 2022–2027 |
| Casalmaggiore | Filippo Bongiovanni | LN | FI • LN • FdI | 2024–2029 |

== Demographics ==
Historical population
| Year | Pop. | ±% |
|---|---|---|
| 1861 | 291,746 | — |
| 1871 | 305,338 | +4.7% |
| 1881 | 304,535 | −0.3% |
| 1901 | 329,536 | +8.2% |
| 1911 | 353,639 | +7.3% |
| 1921 | 362,489 | +2.5% |
| 1931 | 369,175 | +1.8% |
| 1936 | 369,515 | +0.1% |
| 1951 | 381,816 | +3.3% |
| 1961 | 351,160 | −8.0% |
| 1971 | 334,281 | −4.8% |
| 1981 | 332,236 | −0.6% |
| 1991 | 327,970 | −1.3% |
| 2001 | 335,939 | +2.4% |
| 2011 | 357,623 | +6.5% |
| 2021 | 351,654 | −1.7% |
Source: ISTAT

As of 2026, the population is 355,134, of which 49.9% are male, and 50.1% are female. Minors make up 14.5% of the population, and seniors make up 25.8%.

=== Immigration ===
As of 2025, immigrants make up 14.6% of the population. The 5 largest foreign countries of birth are Romania, India, Morocco, Albania, and Egypt.

=== Quality of life ===
According to the European Environment Agency, in 2020 Cremona was the Italian province with the highest number of deaths caused by fine particulate matter PM 2.5 (between 150 and 200 deaths per 100,000 residents). As of 2023, it was the fourth most polluted city in Europe and the first in Italy.

== Culture ==
The city of Cremona has a strong musical tradition. The cathedral, built in the twelfth century, provided a focus for musical activity and by the sixteenth century, the town was the musical centre of the region. Even now it attracts people to hear performances by ensembles and attend the many festivals. The Renaissance composer Marc'Antonio Ingegneri taught here, his most illustrious pupil being Claudio Monteverdi. The composer Pierre-Francisque Caroubel was born here and later moved to Wolfenbüttel in Germany to collaborate with Michael Praetorius. The town became renowned for the violins and other musical instruments that were made here (many members of the Stradivari, Amati, Guarneri and Bergonzi families of luthiers were all prominent citizens of Cremona), and was also well known for its concert bands. A band school was started here in 1864 under the auspices of the composer Amilcare Ponchielli. The "traditional violin craftsmanship in Cremona" was declared an intangible cultural heritage by UNESCO in 2012.

== Economy ==
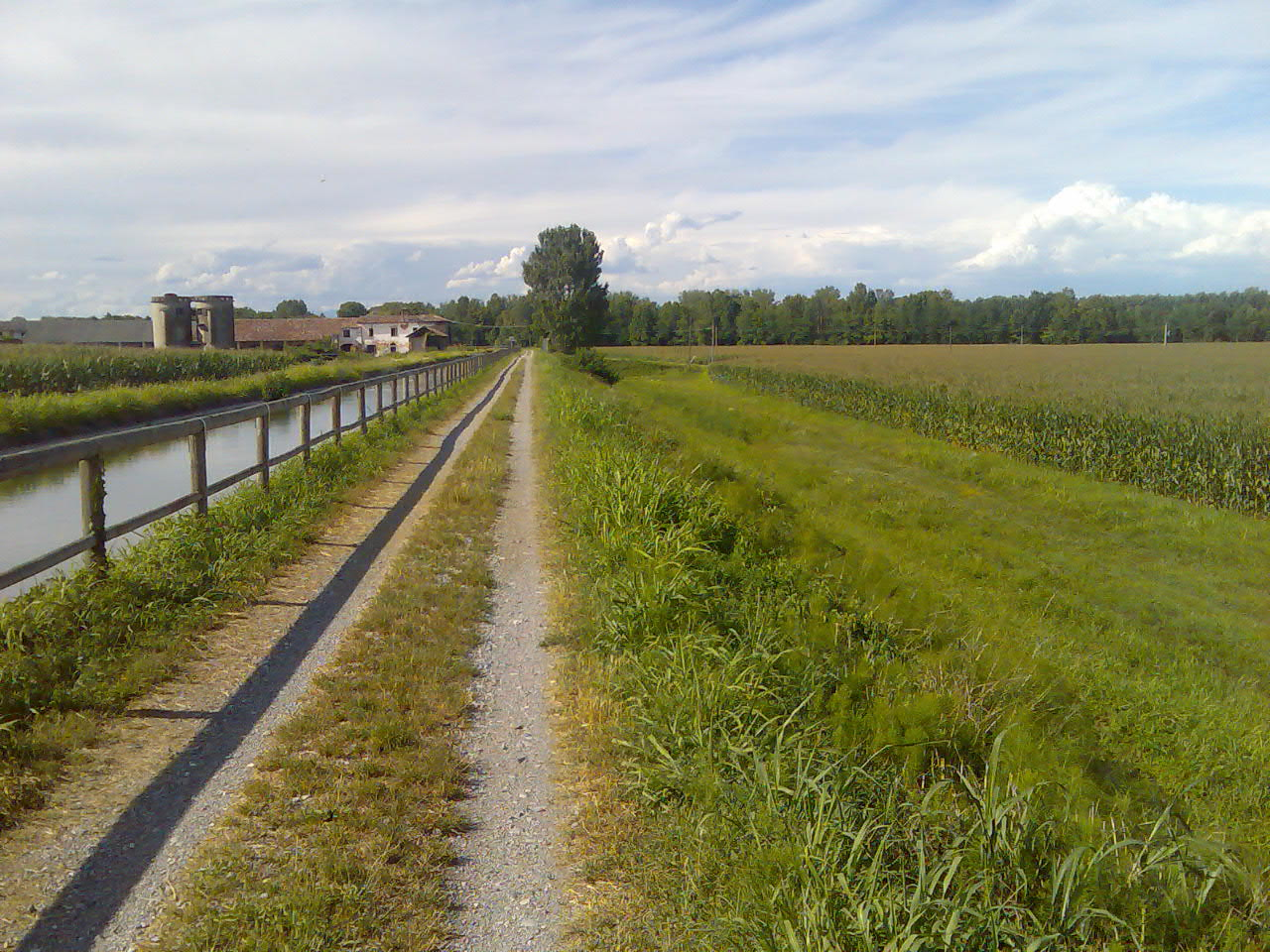
Typical lombard countryside with corn fields in Soresina

The principal economic resources of the province of Cremona are agricultural. Rice is grown with the help of water drawn from canals. Other crops include maize (corn), locally called Melegot and barley and to a lesser extent, soya and sugar beet. Grapes are cultivated and wine produced, and there is also a silk industry. The farms in the province are some of the most productive in the country. Other industries are quite developed, mostly in the northern zone, near Crema, where there are textiles, chemical, and mechanical factories.

Beef and dairy cattle are kept in the province. The beef serves as an ingredient for local dishes, and milk from the dairy cows is used to create traditional cheeses as well as producing butter and cream. The area is famous for its food specialities, such as nougat (Italian: torrone) and mustard. It is unclear exactly where torrone originated, but the recipe used in Cremona is the best known.

== Transport ==
=== Motorways ===
- Autostrada A21: Turin–Brescia

=== Railway lines ===
- Treviglio–Cremona railway
- Brescia–Parma railway
- Cremona–Fidenza railway
- Piacenza–Cremona railway

== Gallery ==
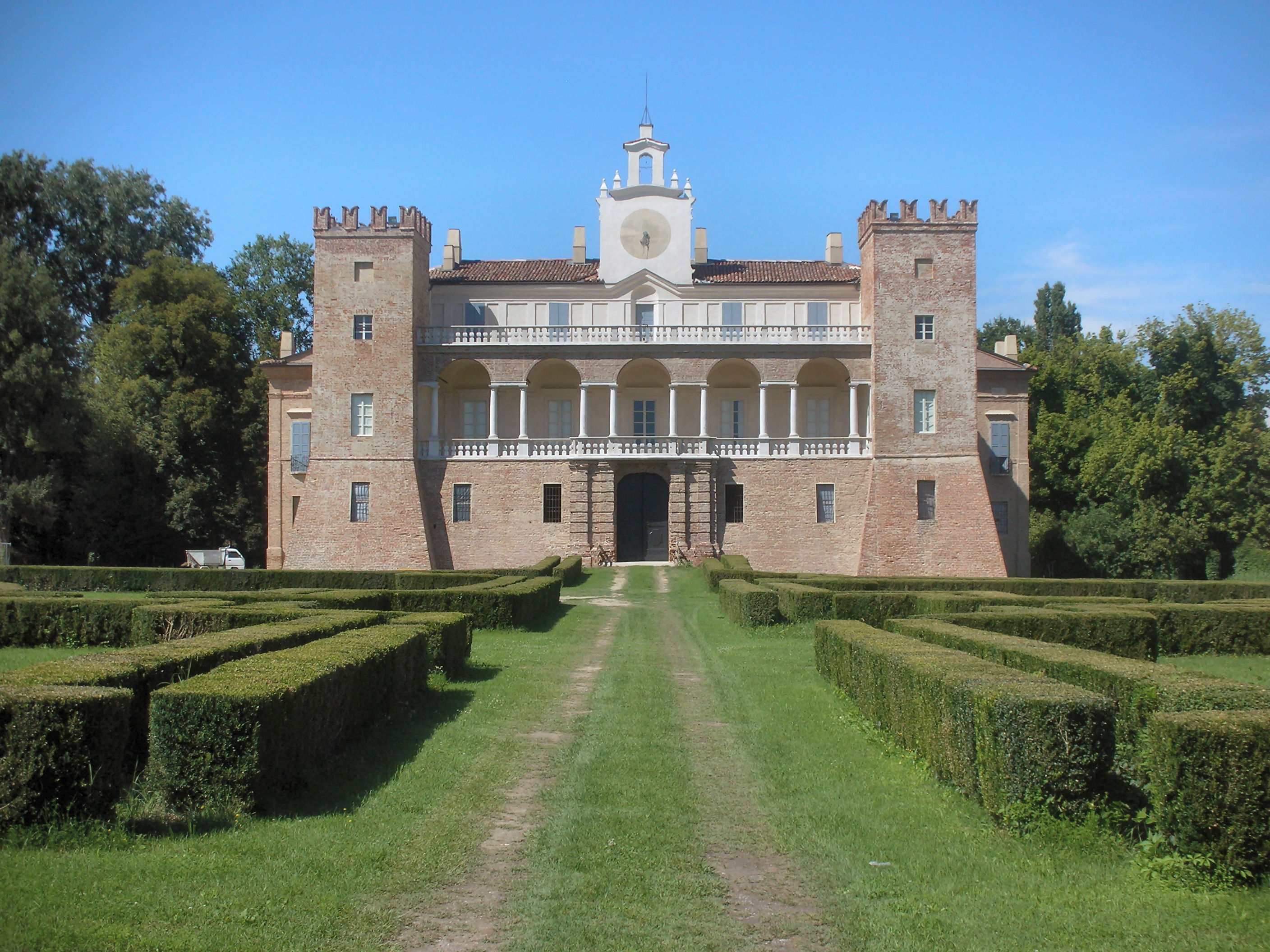
Villa Medici del Vascello in San Giovanni in Croce

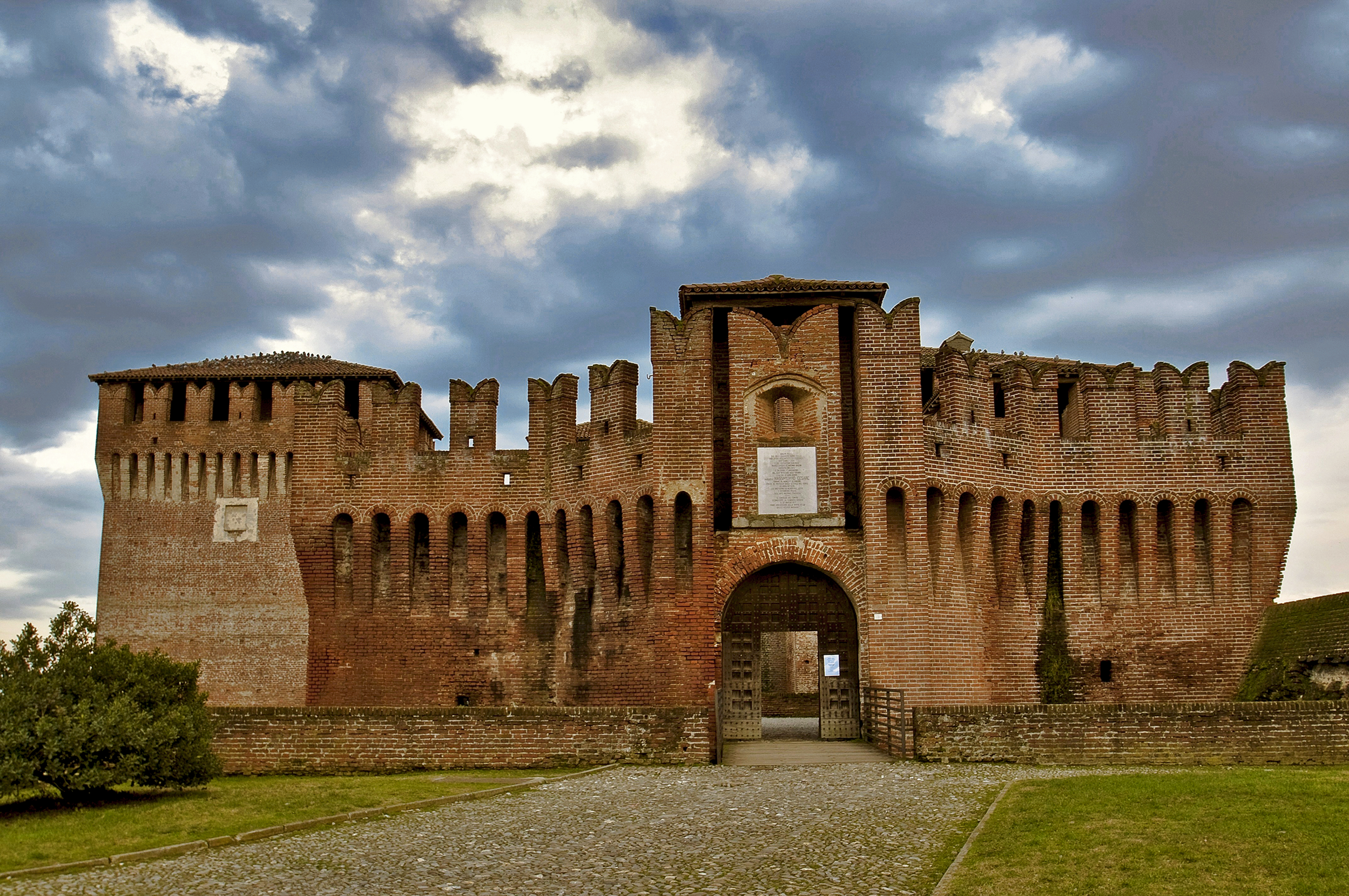
The castle of Soncino

Gazzo Castle in Scandolara Ripa d'Oglio

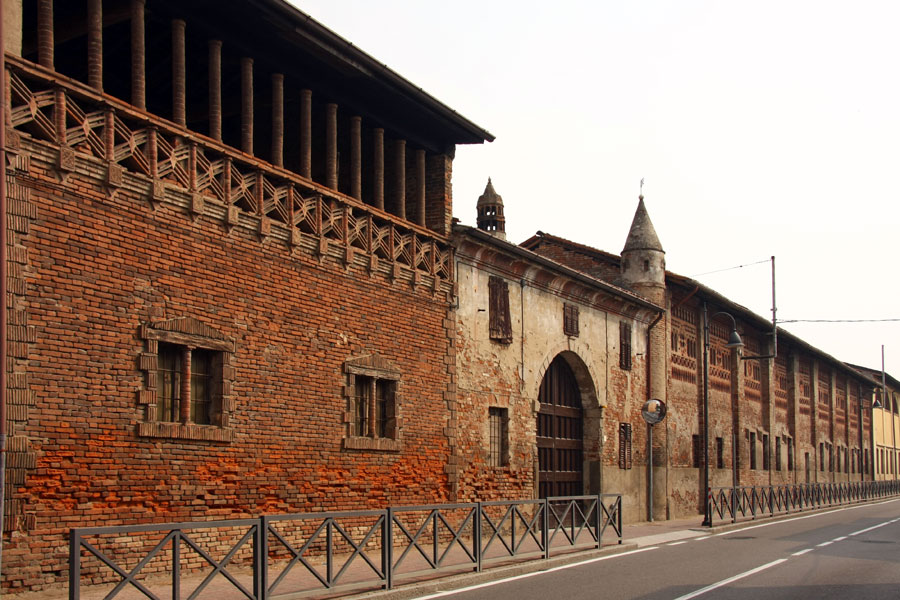
Cascina a corte main entrance in Palazzo Pignano

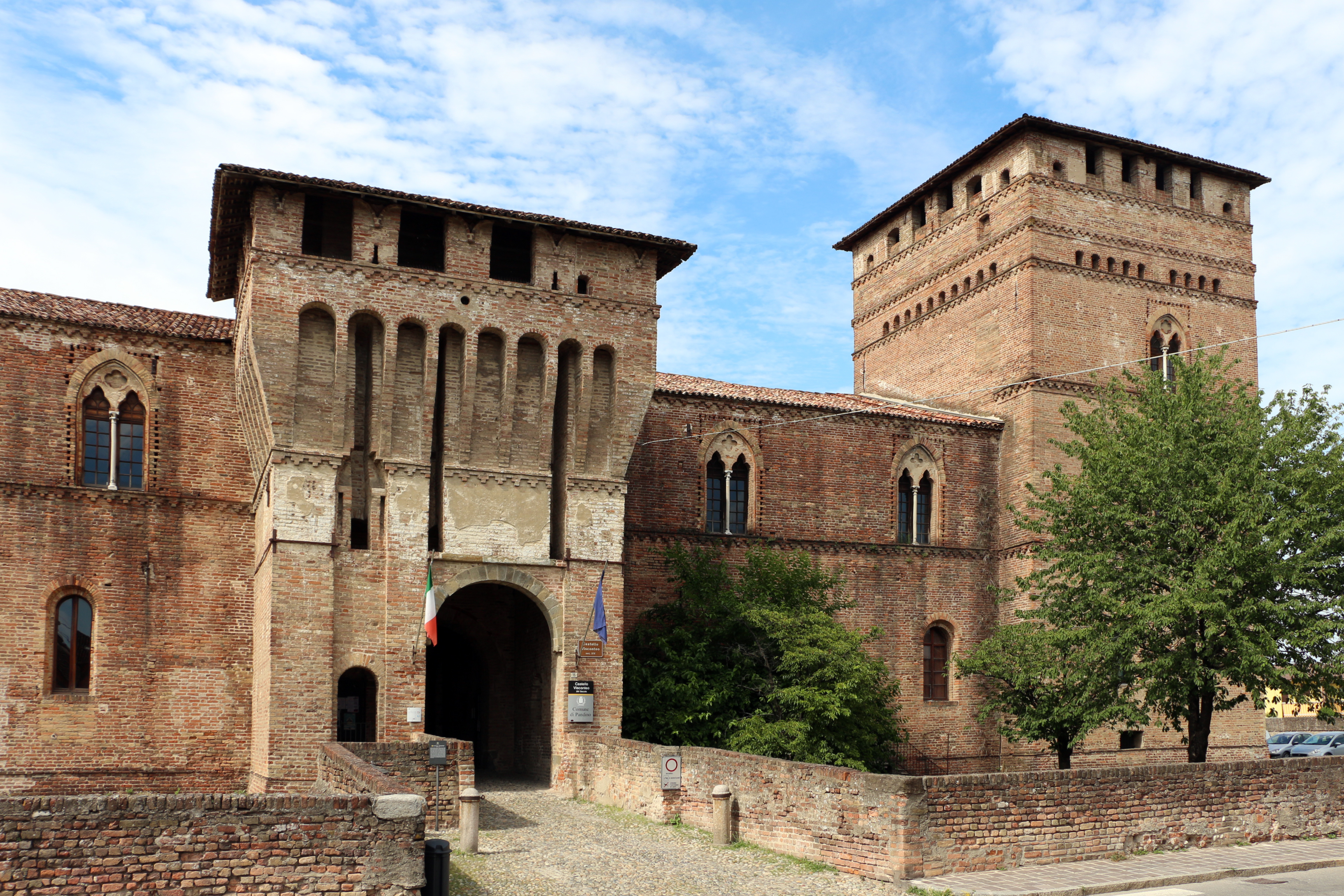
The castle of Pandino

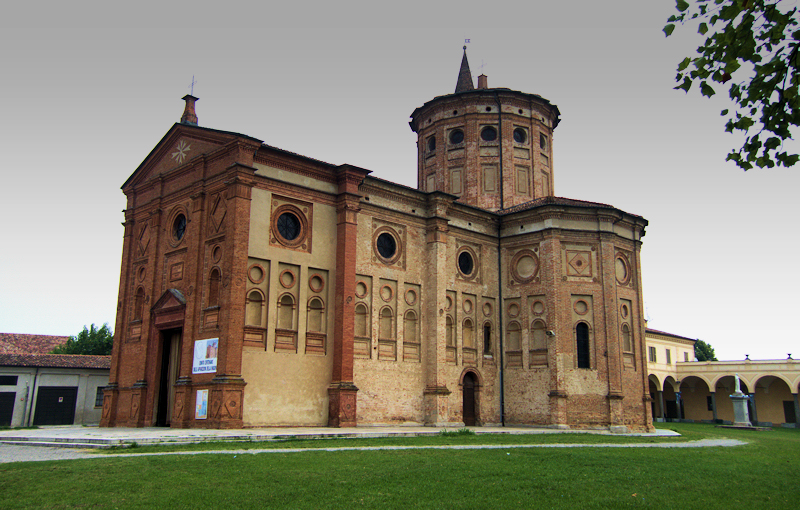
Sanctuary of Madonna della Misericordia in Castelleone
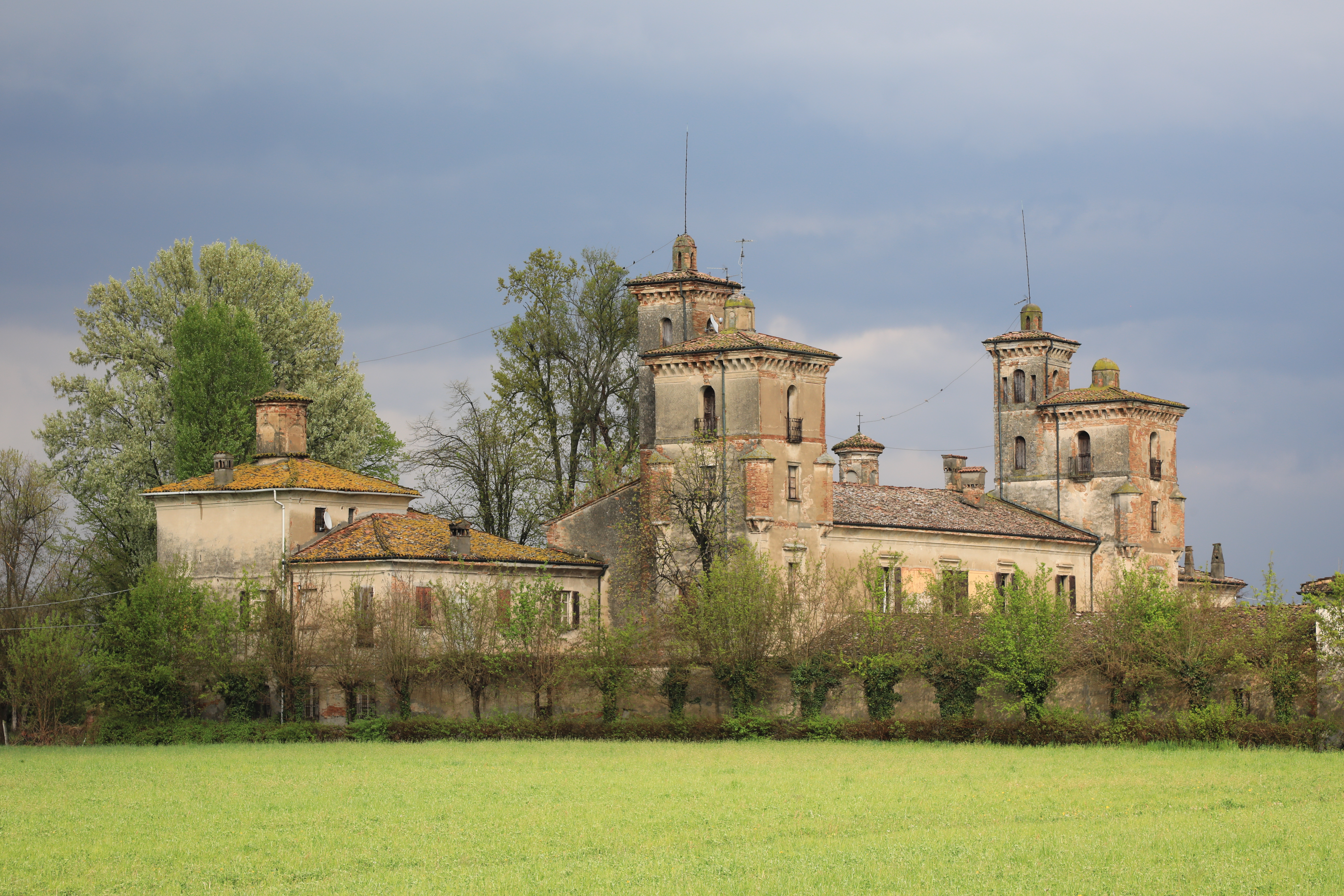
Villa Mina della Scala in Casteldidone

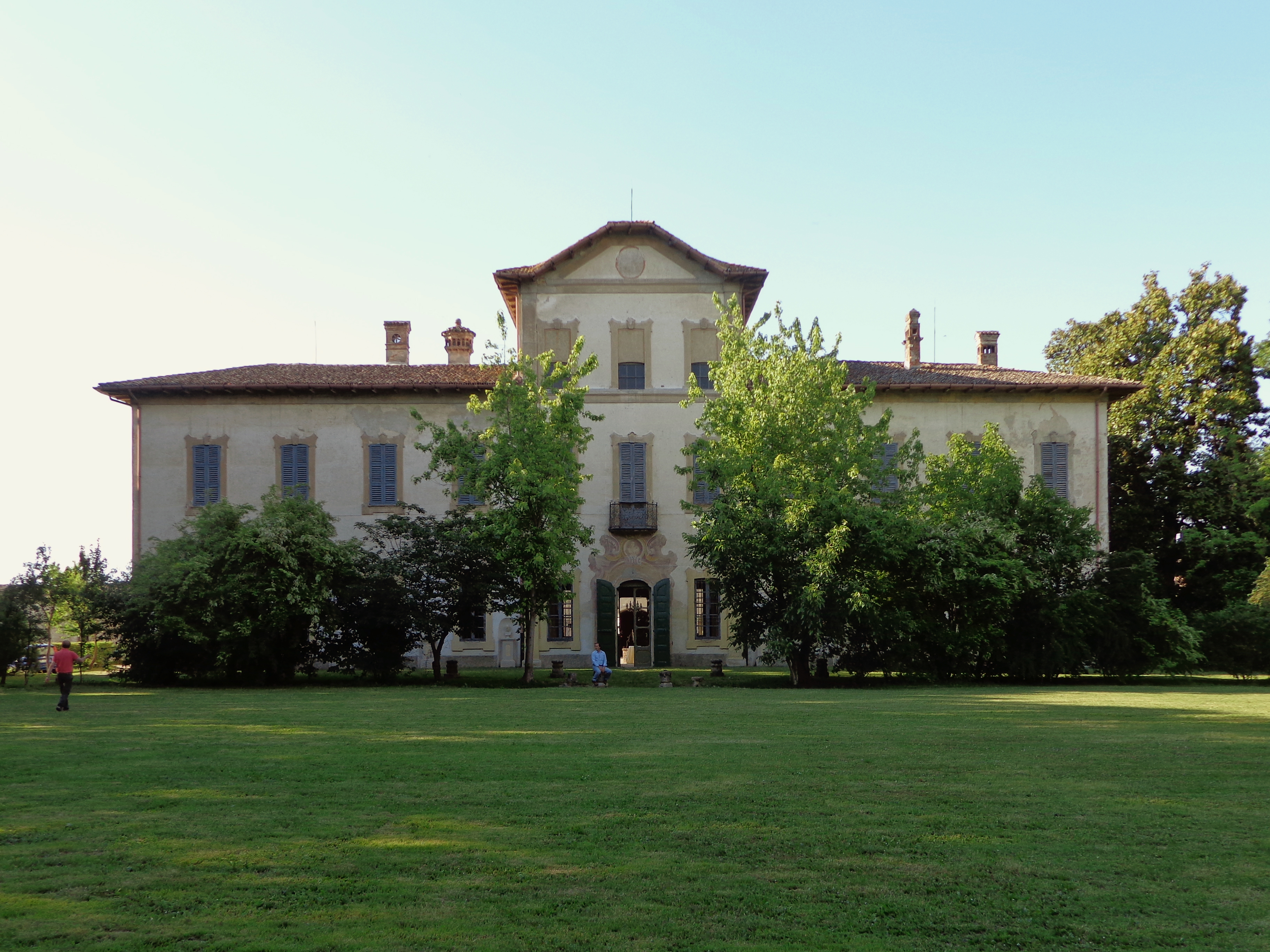
Villa Barni in Dovera

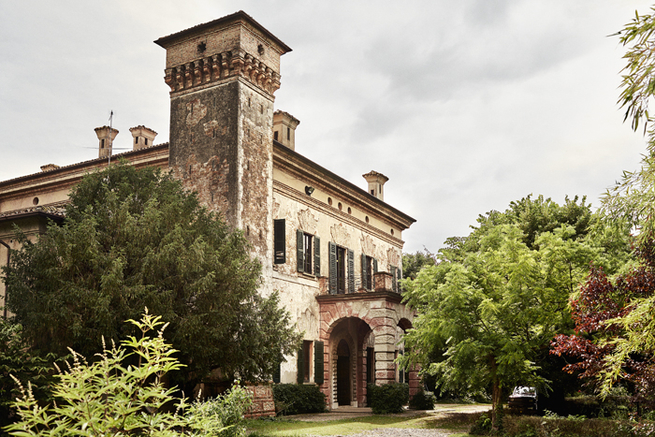
Villa Albergoni in Moscazzano

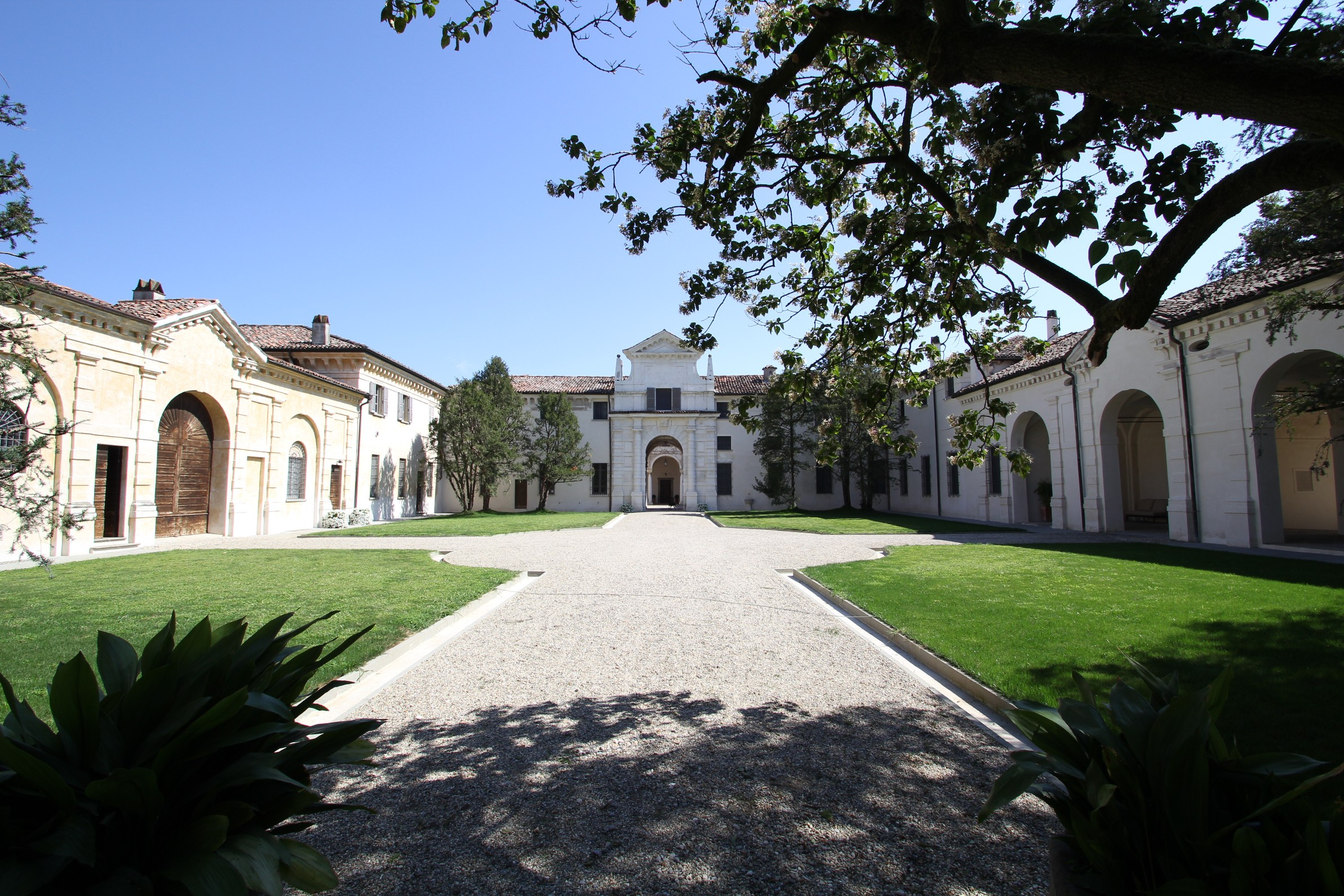
Villa Affaitati in Grumello Cremonese ed Uniti
