= Motta Baluffi =

- Comune
- Comune di Motta Baluffi
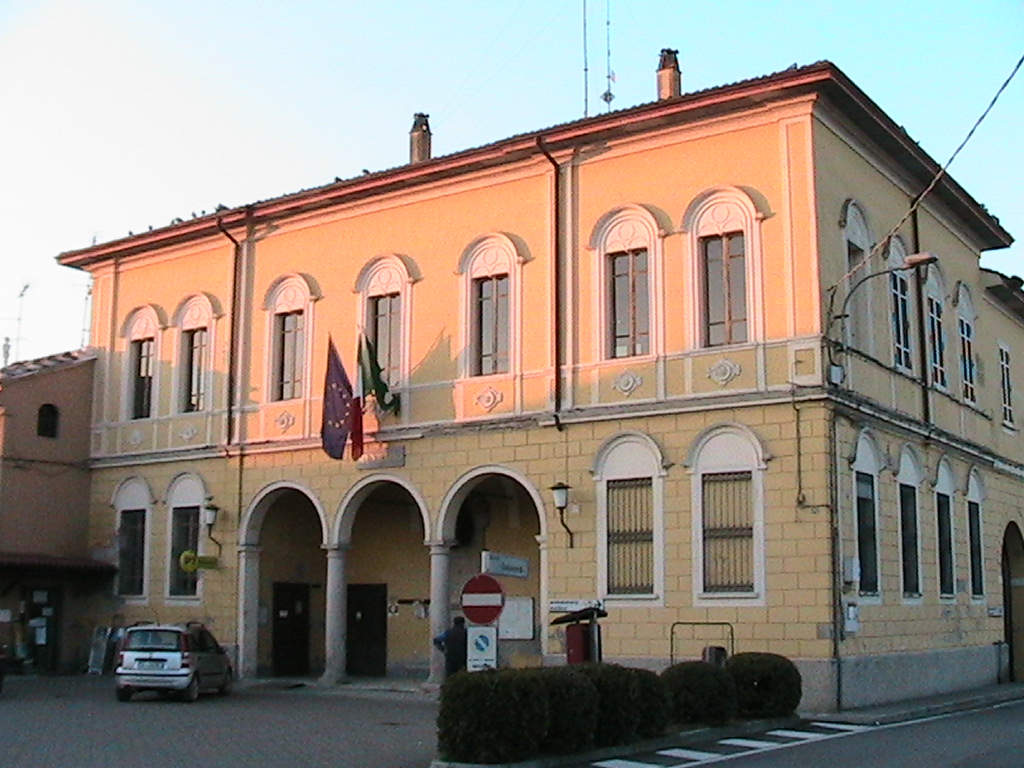

- Coat of arms

- Location within Italy Location within Lombardy
- Coordinates: 45°3′N 10°16′E
- Country: Italy
- Region: Lombardy
- Province: Cremona (CR)

Government
  - Mayor: Giovanni Delmiglio

Area
  - Total: 16.47 km^{2} (6.36 sq mi)

Population (28 February 2017)
  - Total: 898
  - Density: 54.5/km^{2} (141/sq mi)
- Time zone: UTC+1 (CET)
  - Summer (DST): UTC+2 (CEST)
- Postal code: 26045
- Dialing code: 0375

Motta Baluffi (Cremunés: La Mòta) is a comune (municipality) in the Province of Cremona in the Italian region Lombardy, located about 100 kilometres (62 mi) southeast of Milan and about 20 kilometres (12 mi) southeast of Cremona.

Motta Baluffi borders the following municipalities: Cella Dati, Cingia de' Botti, Roccabianca, San Daniele Po, Scandolara Ravara, Torricella del Pizzo.
