= Gadesco-Pieve Delmona =

Gadesco-Pieve Delmona Gadésc-Piéef Delmoùna (Lombard)
- Comune
- Comune di Gadesco-Pieve Delmona
- Coat of arms

- Location within Italy Location within Lombardy
- Coordinates: 45°9′N 10°6′E
- Country: Italy
- Region: Lombardy
- Province: Cremona (CR)

Government
  - Mayor: Achille Marelli

Area
  - Total: 17.1 km^{2} (6.6 sq mi)
- Elevation: 44 m (144 ft)

Population (28 February 2017)
  - Total: 2,012
  - Density: 118/km^{2} (305/sq mi)
- Demonym: Gadeschesi
- Time zone: UTC+1 (CET)
  - Summer (DST): UTC+2 (CEST)
- Postal code: 26030
- Dialing code: 0372
- Website: Official website

Gadesco-Pieve Delmona (Cremunés: Gadésc-Piéef Delmoùna) is a comune (municipality) in the Province of Cremona in the Italian region Lombardy, located about 80 kilometres (50 mi) southeast of Milan and about 6 kilometres (4 mi) northeast of Cremona.

Gadesco-Pieve Delmona borders the following municipalities: Cremona, Grontardo, Malagnino, Persico Dosimo, Vescovato.
