= Scandolara Ripa d'Oglio =

- Comune
- Comune di Scandolara Ripa d'Oglio
- Coat of arms

- Location within Italy Location within Lombardy
- Coordinates: 45°13′N 10°9′E
- Country: Italy
- Region: Lombardy
- Province: Cremona (CR)

Government
  - Mayor: Pierino Agnelli

Area
  - Total: 5.7 km^{2} (2.2 sq mi)

Population (Dec. 2004)
  - Total: 640
  - Density: 110/km^{2} (290/sq mi)
- Time zone: UTC+1 (CET)
  - Summer (DST): UTC+2 (CEST)
- Postal code: 26047
- Dialing code: 0372

Scandolara Ripa d'Oglio (Cremunés: Scandulèra) is a comune (municipality) in the Province of Cremona in the Italian region Lombardy, located about 80 kilometres (50 mi) southeast of Milan and about 13 kilometres (8 mi) northeast of Cremona.

Scandolara Ripa d'Oglio borders the following municipalities: Alfianello, Corte de' Frati, Gabbioneta-Binanuova, Grontardo, Seniga.
