= Palazzo Pignano =

Comune in Lombardy, Italy

Palazzo Pignano Palàs Pignàn (Lombard)
- Comune
- Comune di Palazzo Pignano
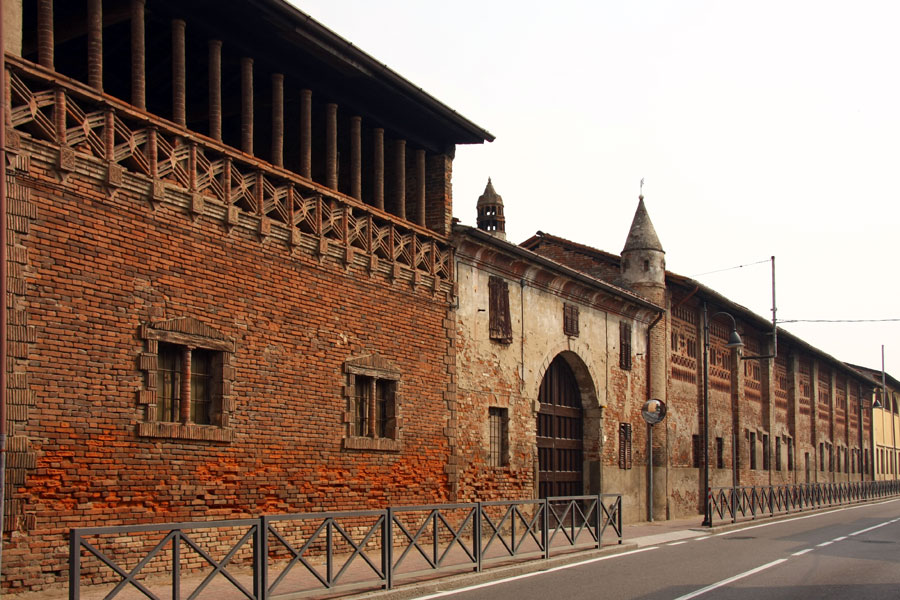

- Location within Italy Location within Lombardy
- Coordinates: 45°23′N 9°34′E
- Country: Italy
- Region: Lombardy
- Province: Cremona (CR)
- Frazioni: Cascine Capri, Cascine Gandini, Scannabue

Government
  - Mayor: Dossena Giuseppe

Area
  - Total: 8.9 km^{2} (3.4 sq mi)
- Elevation: 82 m (269 ft)

Population (28 February 2017)
  - Total: 3,802
  - Density: 430/km^{2} (1,100/sq mi)
- Demonym: Pignanesi
- Time zone: UTC+1 (CET)
  - Summer (DST): UTC+2 (CEST)
- Postal code: 26020
- Dialing code: 0373
- Website: Official website

Palazzo Pignano (Cremasco: Palàs Pignàn) is a comune (municipality) in the Province of Cremona in the Italian region Lombardy, located about 35 kilometres (22 mi) southeast of Milan and about 45 kilometres (28 mi) northwest of Cremona.

Palazzo Pignano borders the following municipalities: Agnadello, Bagnolo Cremasco, Monte Cremasco, Pandino, Torlino Vimercati, Trescore Cremasco, Vaiano Cremasco.

The main sights is the medieval pieve (rural church), dating from the 4th century AD but later rebuilt in Romanesque style. It houses a terracotta cycle by Agostino Fondulis.

== People ==
- Stefano Donati, (1982), journalist
