= Trescore =

Trescore may refer to:

- Trescore Balneario, town and comune in the Province of Bergamo, Lombardy, northern Italy
- Trescore Cremasco, comune in the province of Cremona in the Italian region Lombardy, northern Italy
