= Bonemerse =

Bonemerse Bunemérs (Lombard)
- Comune
- Comune di Bonemerse
- Location within Italy Location within Lombardy
- Coordinates: 45°7′N 10°5′E
- Country: Italy
- Region: Lombardy
- Province: Cremona (CR)

Government
  - Mayor: Alessio Maffezzoni

Area
  - Total: 5.9 km^{2} (2.3 sq mi)
- Elevation: 40 m (130 ft)

Population (28 February 2017)
  - Total: 1,512
  - Density: 260/km^{2} (660/sq mi)
- Demonym: Bonemersesi
- Time zone: UTC+1 (CET)
  - Summer (DST): UTC+2 (CEST)
- Postal code: 26040
- Dialing code: 0372
- Website: Official website

Bonemerse (Cremunés: Bunemérs) is a comune (municipality) in the Province of Cremona in the Italian region Lombardy, located about 80 kilometres (50 mi) southeast of Milan and about 4 kilometres (2 mi) southeast of Cremona.

Bonemerse borders the following municipalities: Cremona, Malagnino, Pieve d'Olmi, Stagno Lombardo.
