= Torricella del Pizzo =

- Comune
- Comune di Torricella del Pizzo
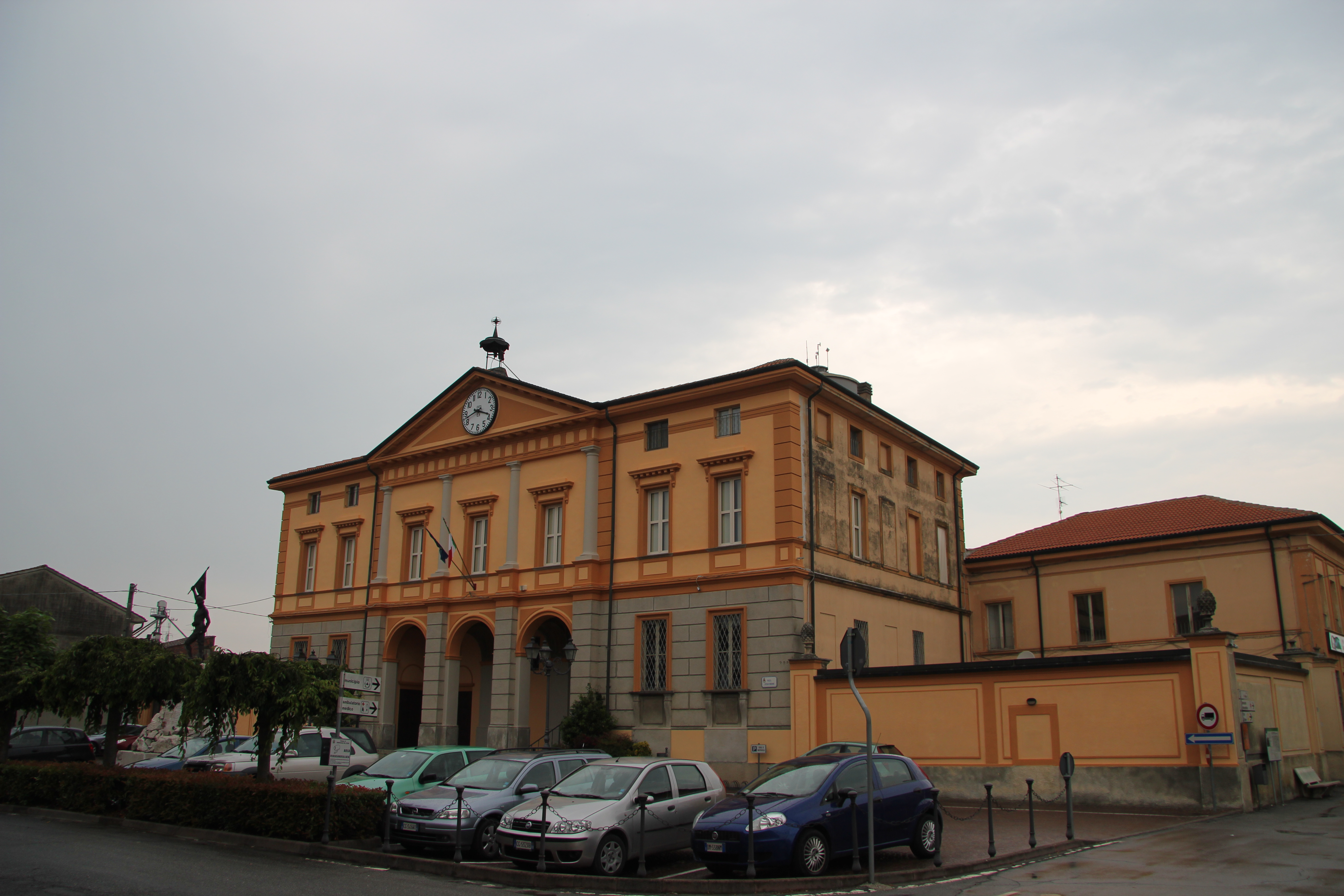
- Town hall.

- Coat of arms

- Location within Italy Location within Lombardy
- Coordinates: 45°1′N 10°18′E
- Country: Italy
- Region: Lombardy
- Province: Cremona (CR)

Government
  - Mayor: Sigrid Bini

Area
  - Total: 24.4 km^{2} (9.4 sq mi)
- Elevation: 29 m (95 ft)

Population (31 December 2010)
  - Total: 693
  - Density: 28.4/km^{2} (73.6/sq mi)
- Demonym: Torricellesi
- Time zone: UTC+1 (CET)
  - Summer (DST): UTC+2 (CEST)
- Postal code: 26040
- Dialing code: 0375
- Website: Official website

Torricella del Pizzo (Cremunés: Turezéla; locally Turzéla) is a comune (municipality) in the Province of Cremona in the Italian region Lombardy, located about 100 kilometres (62 mi) southeast of Milan and about 25 kilometres (16 mi) southeast of Cremona. Torricella del Pizzo borders the following municipalities: Gussola, Motta Baluffi, Roccabianca, Scandolara Ravara, Sissa Trecasali.
