= San Basilio, Grontardo =

Church in Grontardo, Italy

Coordinates: 45°12′2.3″N 10°9′7.5″E

San Basilio Vescovo is a Roman Catholic parish church located on Via Trieste in the town of Grontardo in the province of Cremona, region of Lombardy, Italy.

== History ==
The whole church, except the choir, was rebuilt in a Neoclassical-style in 1840. It houses an altarpiece by one of the painters of the family of Sigismondo Benini.
