= Casaletto Vaprio =

- Comune
- Comune di Casaletto Vaprio
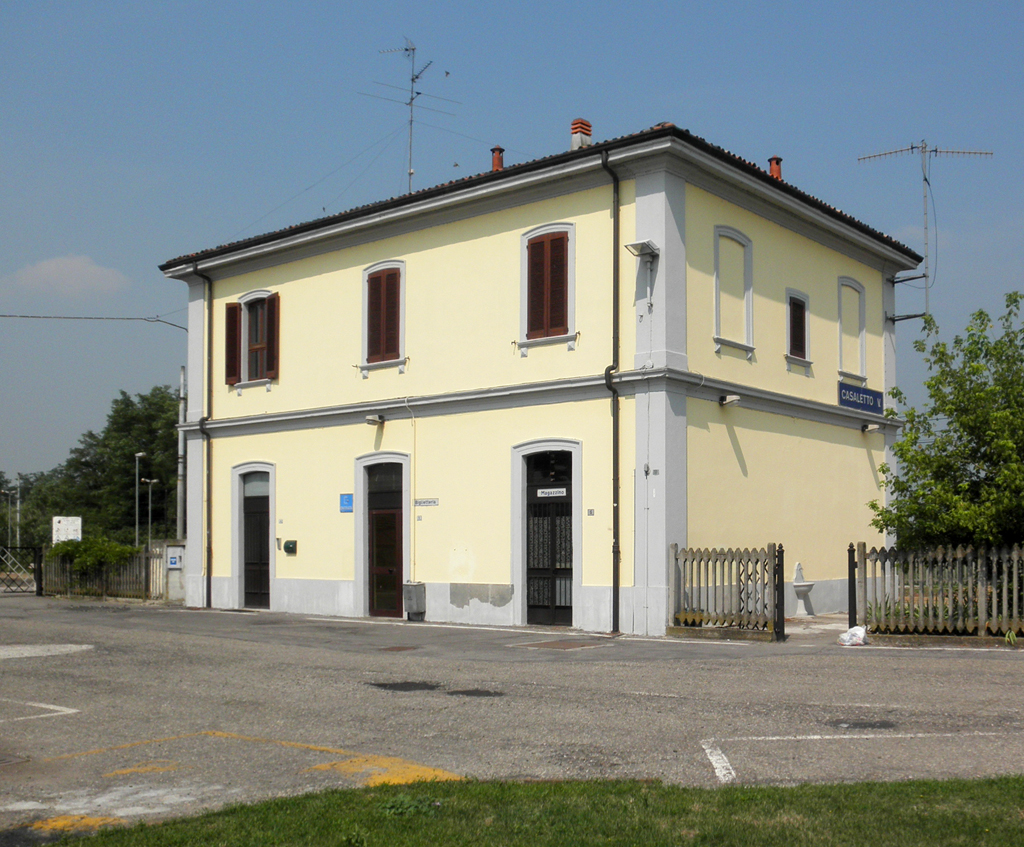
- Railway station.

- Coat of arms

- Location within Italy Location within Lombardy
- Coordinates: 45°24′N 9°38′E
- Country: Italy
- Region: Lombardy
- Province: Cremona (CR)

Government
  - Mayor: Ilaria Dioli

Area
  - Total: 5.4 km^{2} (2.1 sq mi)
- Elevation: 87 m (285 ft)

Population (28 February 217)
  - Total: 1,761
  - Density: 330/km^{2} (840/sq mi)
- Demonym: Casalettesi
- Time zone: UTC+1 (CET)
  - Summer (DST): UTC+2 (CEST)
- Postal code: 26010
- Dialing code: 0373
- Website: Official website

Casaletto Vaprio (Cremish: Casalèt) is a comune (municipality) in the Province of Cremona in the Italian region Lombardy, located about 35 kilometres (22 mi) east of Milan and about 45 kilometres (28 mi) northwest of Cremona. Notable natives include the composer Stefano Pavesi.

Casaletto Vaprio borders the following municipalities: Campagnola Cremasca, Capralba, Cremosano, Quintano, Trescore Cremasco.

== Transportation ==
Casaletto Vaprio has a railway station on the Treviglio–Cremona line.
