= Cella Dati =

- Comune
- Comune di Cella Dati
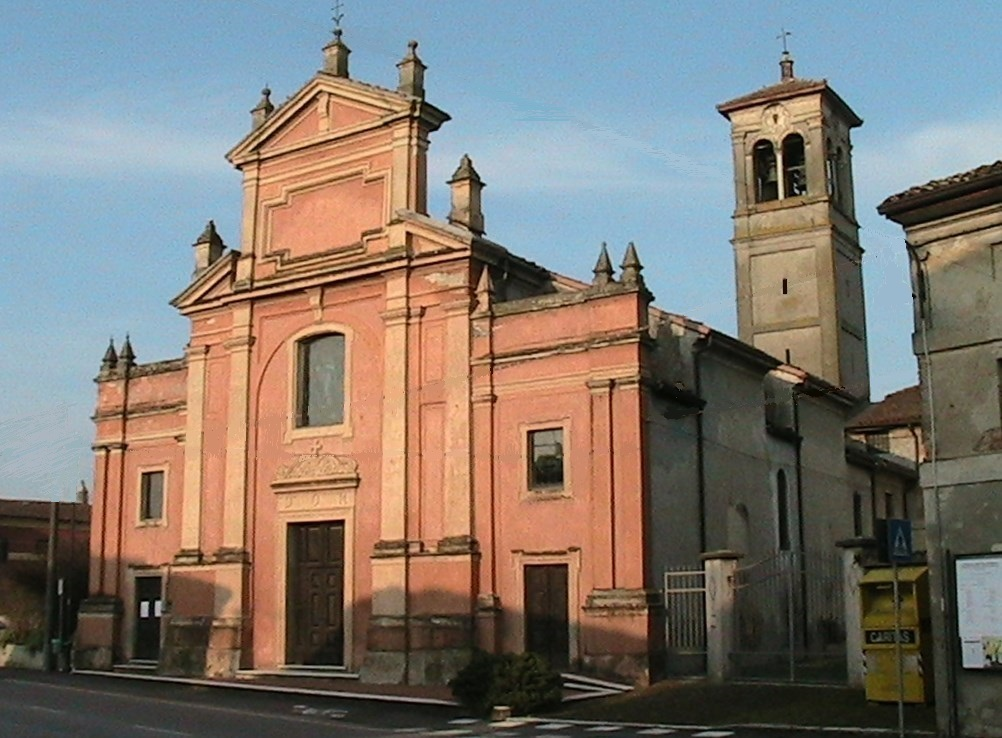

- Location within Italy Location within Lombardy
- Coordinates: 45°6′N 10°13′E
- Country: Italy
- Region: Lombardy
- Province: Cremona (CR)

Government
  - Mayor: Giuseppe Rivaroli

Area
  - Total: 19.1 km^{2} (7.4 sq mi)
- Elevation: 34 m (112 ft)

Population (30 June 2017)
  - Total: 506
  - Density: 26.5/km^{2} (68.6/sq mi)
- Demonym: Cellesi
- Time zone: UTC+1 (CET)
  - Summer (DST): UTC+2 (CEST)
- Postal code: 26040
- Dialing code: 0372
- Website: Official website

Cella Dati (Cremunés: Céla) is a comune (municipality) in the Province of Cremona in the Italian region Lombardy, located about 90 kilometres (56 mi) southeast of Milan and about 15 kilometres (9 mi) east of Cremona.

Cella Dati borders the following municipalities: Cingia de' Botti, Derovere, Motta Baluffi, Pieve San Giacomo, San Daniele Po, Sospiro.
