= Trescore Cremasco =

- Comune
- Comune di Trescore Cremasco
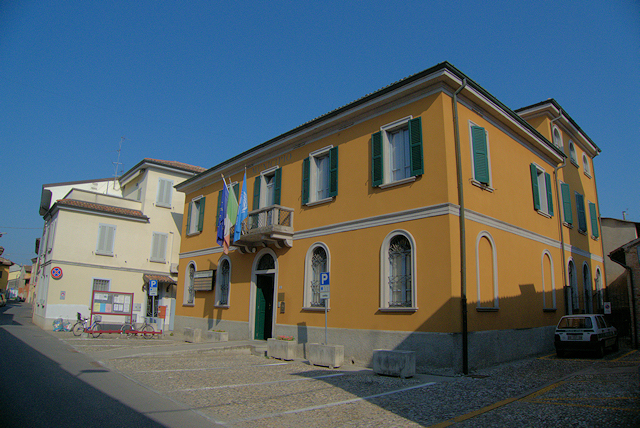
- Town Hall.

- Coat of arms

- Location within Italy Location within Lombardy
- Coordinates: 45°24′N 9°38′E
- Country: Italy
- Region: Lombardy
- Province: Cremona (CR)

Government
  - Mayor: Angelo Barbati

Area
  - Total: 5.9 km^{2} (2.3 sq mi)
- Elevation: 86 m (282 ft)

Population (28 February 2017)
  - Total: 2,883
  - Density: 490/km^{2} (1,300/sq mi)
- Demonym: Trescoresi
- Time zone: UTC+1 (CET)
  - Summer (DST): UTC+2 (CEST)
- Postal code: 26017
- Dialing code: 0373
- Patron saint: St. Agatha
- Saint day: 5 February
- Website: Official website

Trescore Cremasco (Cremasco: Trescur) is a comune (municipality) in the province of Cremona in the Italian region Lombardy, located about 35 kilometres (22 mi) east of Milan and about 45 kilometres (28 mi) northwest of Cremona.

Trescore Cremasco borders the following municipalities: Bagnolo Cremasco, Casaletto Vaprio, Crema, Cremosano, Palazzo Pignano, Quintano, Torlino Vimercati, Vaiano Cremasco.
