= Agnadello =

Agnadello Agnadèl, Gnìdel (Lombard)
- Comune
- Comune di Agnadello
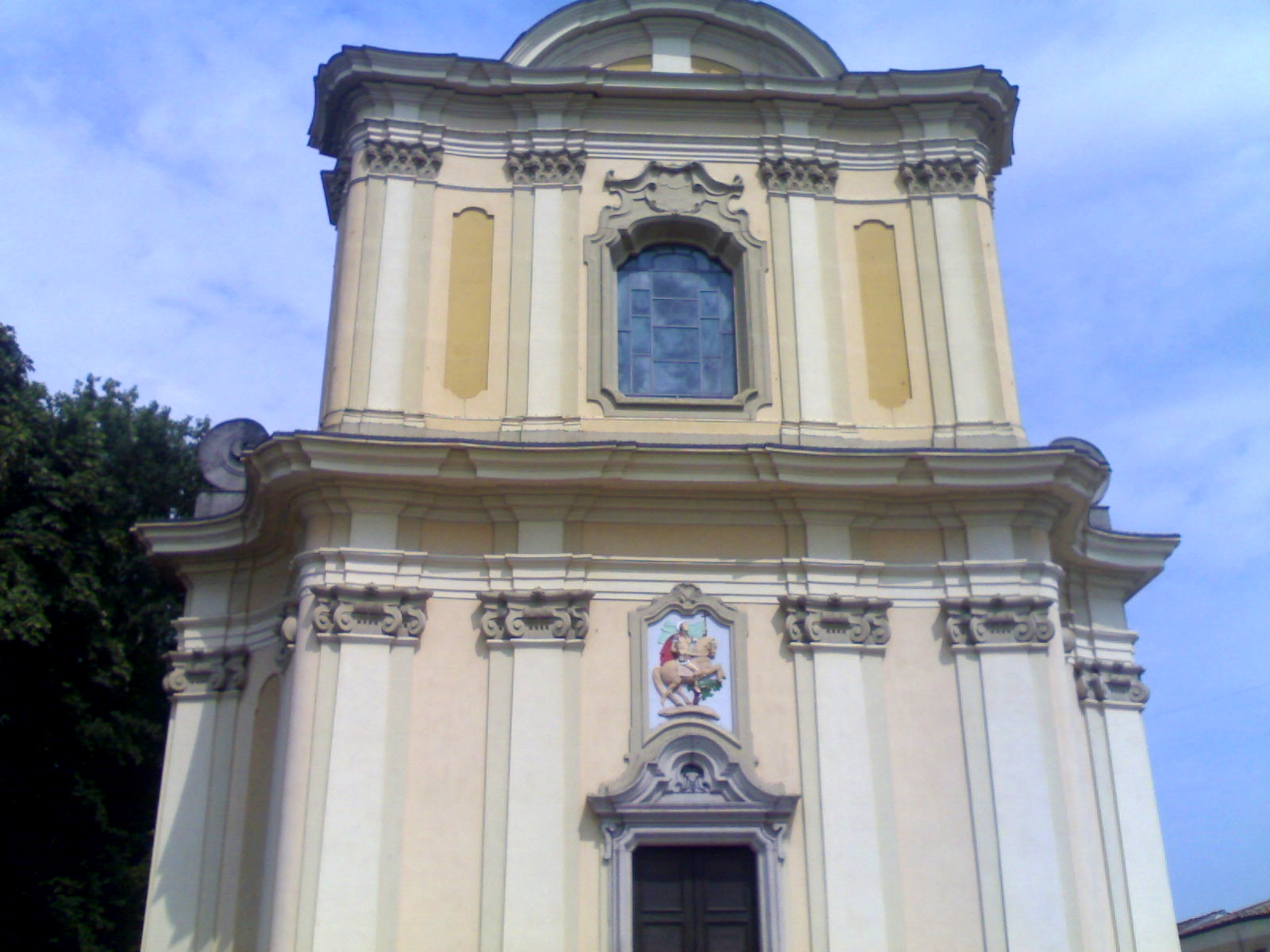
- Church of San Vittore

- Location of Agnadello in Italy Agnadello (Lombardy)
- Coordinates: 45°27′N 9°34′E
- Country: Italy
- Region: Lombardy
- Province: Cremona (CR)

Government
  - Mayor: Giovanni Calderara

Area
  - Total: 12 km^{2} (4.6 sq mi)
- Elevation: 94 m (308 ft)

Population (28 February 2017)
  - Total: 3,881
  - Density: 320/km^{2} (840/sq mi)
- Demonym: Agnadellesi
- Time zone: UTC+1 (CET)
  - Summer (DST): UTC+2 (CEST)
- Postal code: 26020
- Dialing code: 0373
- Patron saint: St. Victor
- Saint day: 8 May
- Website: Official website

Agnadello (Cremasco: Agnadèl or Gnidèl) is a comune and village in the province of Cremona, Lombardy, northern Italy. It was the location of the battle of Agnadello in which Louis XII of France defeated the Venetians on 14 May 1509.
