= Pieranica =

Pieranica Pieràniga (Lombard)
- Comune
- Comune di Pieranica
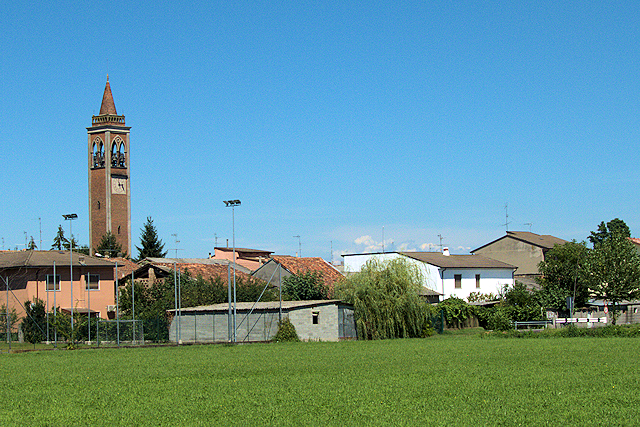

- Coat of arms

- Location within Italy Location within Lombardy
- Coordinates: 45°25′N 9°37′E
- Country: Italy
- Region: Lombardy
- Province: Cremona (CR)

Government
  - Mayor: Antonio Benzoni

Area
  - Total: 2.7 km^{2} (1.0 sq mi)
- Elevation: 91 m (299 ft)

Population (31 December 2010)
  - Total: 1,181
  - Density: 440/km^{2} (1,100/sq mi)
- Demonym: Pieranichesi
- Time zone: UTC+1 (CET)
  - Summer (DST): UTC+2 (CEST)
- Postal code: 26017
- Dialing code: 0373
- Patron saint: St. Blaise
- Saint day: 3 May
- Website: Official website

Pieranica (Cremasco: Pieràniga) is a comune (municipality) in the Province of Cremona in the Italian region Lombardy, located about 35 kilometres (22 mi) east of Milan and about 45 kilometres (28 mi) northwest of Cremona.
