= List of municipalities of the province of Cremona =

The following is a list of the 113 municipalities (comuni) of the province of Cremona in the region of Lombardy in Italy.

== List ==
Municipality	Population (2026)	Area (km^{2})	Density
Acquanegra Cremonese	1,167	9.22	126.6
Agnadello	3,963	12.08	328.1
Annicco	1,980	19.20	103.1
Azzanello	631	11.12	56.7
Bagnolo Cremasco	5,115	10.39	492.3
Bonemerse	1,434	5.90	243.1
Bordolano	602	8.14	74.0
Calvatone	1,130	13.70	82.5
Camisano	1,253	10.95	114.4
Campagnola Cremasca	649	4.64	139.9
Capergnanica	2,150	6.84	314.3
Cappella Cantone	538	13.15	40.9
Cappella de' Picenardi	422	14.20	29.7
Capralba	2,293	13.45	170.5
Casalbuttano ed Uniti	3,796	22.88	165.9
Casale Cremasco-Vidolasco	1,815	9.19	197.5
Casaletto Ceredano	1,171	6.52	179.6
Casaletto di Sopra	527	8.66	60.9
Casaletto Vaprio	1,778	5.40	329.3
Casalmaggiore	15,114	64.53	234.2
Casalmorano	1,727	12.28	140.6
Castel Gabbiano	542	5.79	93.6
Casteldidone	542	10.79	50.2
Castelleone	9,340	45.08	207.2
Castelverde	5,699	30.89	184.5
Castelvisconti	306	9.76	31.4
Cella Dati	514	18.92	27.2
Chieve	2,270	6.19	366.7
Cicognolo	977	6.96	140.4
Cingia de' Botti	1,171	14.36	81.5
Corte de' Cortesi con Cignone	1,070	12.85	83.3
Corte de' Frati	1,318	20.41	64.6
Credera Rubbiano	1,476	14.13	104.5
Crema	34,147	34.52	989.2
Cremona	71,093	70.49	1,008.6
Cremosano	1,730	5.76	300.3
Crotta d'Adda	613	12.94	47.4
Cumignano sul Naviglio	406	6.77	60.0
Derovere	284	9.99	28.4
Dovera	3,734	20.65	180.8
Fiesco	1,217	8.19	148.6
Formigara	1,038	12.64	82.1
Gabbioneta-Binanuova	859	15.71	54.7
Gadesco-Pieve Delmona	1,882	17.10	110.1
Genivolta	1,082	18.57	58.3
Gerre de' Caprioli	1,310	7.72	169.7
Gombito	611	9.28	65.8
Grontardo	1,498	12.26	122.2
Grumello Cremonese ed Uniti	1,725	22.29	77.4
Gussola	2,687	25.23	106.5
Isola Dovarese	1,065	9.47	112.5
Izano	1,951	6.19	315.2
Madignano	2,764	10.76	256.9
Malagnino	1,703	10.82	157.4
Martignana di Po	2,024	14.92	135.7
Monte Cremasco	2,217	2.34	947.4
Montodine	2,394	11.39	210.2
Moscazzano	697	8.15	85.5
Motta Baluffi	769	16.47	46.7
Offanengo	5,945	12.58	472.6
Olmeneta	934	9.15	102.1
Ostiano	2,825	19.49	144.9
Paderno Ponchielli	1,292	23.96	53.9
Palazzo Pignano	3,793	8.82	430.0
Pandino	8,988	22.30	403.0
Persico Dosimo	3,250	20.61	157.7
Pescarolo ed Uniti	1,547	16.54	93.5
Pessina Cremonese	574	22.02	26.1
Piadena	4,063	31.69	128.2
Pianengo	2,570	5.76	446.2
Pieranica	1,107	2.73	405.5
Pieve d'Olmi	1,238	19.44	63.7
Pieve San Giacomo	1,571	14.85	105.8
Pizzighettone	6,242	32.06	194.7
Pozzaglio ed Uniti	1,416	20.40	69.4
Quintano	932	2.86	325.9
Ricengo	1,724	12.54	137.5
Ripalta Arpina	1,088	6.96	156.3
Ripalta Cremasca	3,454	11.78	293.2
Ripalta Guerina	538	2.97	181.1
Rivarolo del Re ed Uniti	1,848	27.33	67.6
Rivolta d'Adda	8,358	30.40	274.9
Robecco d'Oglio	2,250	17.96	125.3
Romanengo	3,257	15.05	216.4
Salvirola	1,143	7.36	155.3
San Bassano	2,057	13.93	147.7
San Daniele Po	1,297	22.69	57.2
San Giovanni in Croce	1,915	16.21	118.1
San Martino del Lago	384	10.38	37.0
Scandolara Ravara	1,237	17.08	72.4
Scandolara Ripa d'Oglio	505	5.72	88.3
Sergnano	3,460	12.31	281.1
Sesto ed Uniti	3,286	26.49	124.0
Solarolo Rainerio	921	11.43	80.6
Soncino	7,554	45.32	166.7
Soresina	9,306	28.57	325.7
Sospiro	3,041	18.96	160.4
Spinadesco	1,485	17.21	86.3
Spineda	608	10.11	60.1
Spino d'Adda	7,013	20.02	350.3
Stagno Lombardo	1,402	40.20	34.9
Ticengo	455	7.98	57.0
Torlino Vimercati	451	5.77	78.2
Tornata	400	10.17	39.3
Torre de' Picenardi	2,183	34.23	63.8
Torricella del Pizzo	585	23.23	25.2
Trescore Cremasco	2,916	5.92	492.6
Trigolo	1,648	16.06	102.6
Vaiano Cremasco	3,592	6.15	584.1
Vailate	4,723	9.69	487.4
Vescovato	3,994	17.44	229.0
Volongo	455	8.12	56.0
Voltido	334	12.24	27.3

== See also ==
- List of municipalities of Lombardy
- List of municipalities of Italy
