= Madignano railway station =

Railway station in Madignano, Italy

Madignano
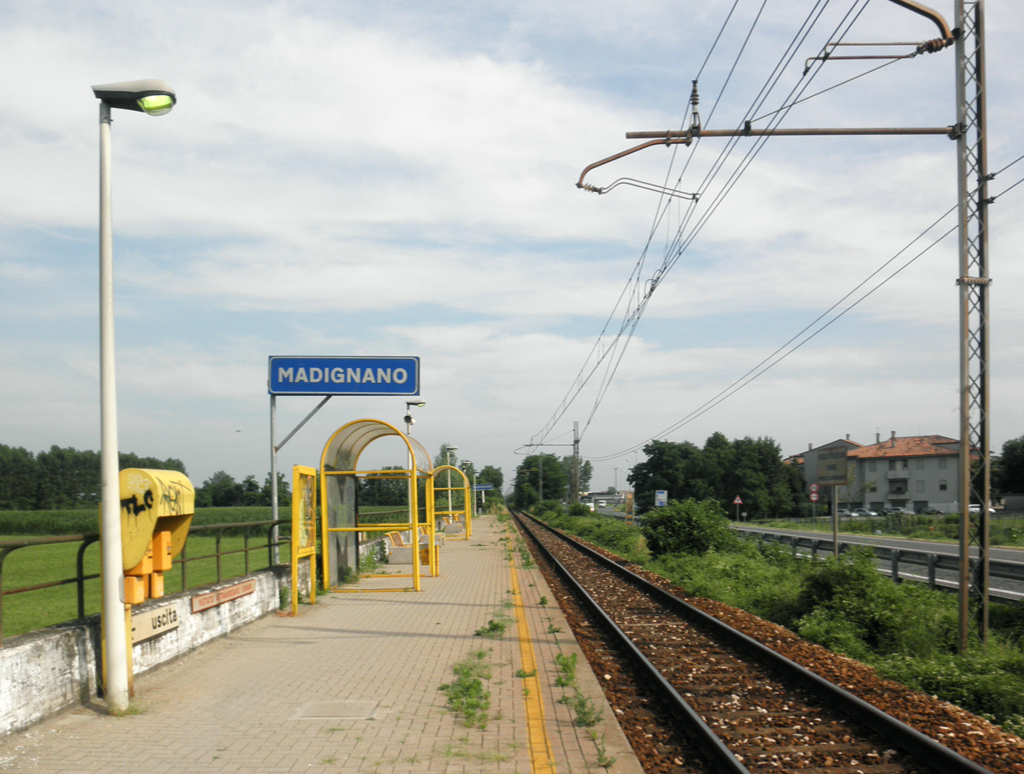

General information
- Location: Italy
- Coordinates: 45°20′37″N 9°43′50″E
- Owner: Rete Ferroviaria Italiana
- Operator: Trenord
- Line: Treviglio–Cremona
- Platforms: 1

Other information
- Classification: Bronze

History
- Opened: 15 September 1996; 29 years ago
Location
- Location within Lombardy Location within Northern Italy Location within Italy

Madignano railway station is a railway station serving the town and comune of Madignano in the region of Lombardy, Northern Italy. The single-platform halt is located on the Treviglio–Cremona railway.

== History ==
When the Treviglio–Cremona line was being constructed in the early 1860s, among the approximately 50 municipalities whose territories would have been affected by the infrastructure, only four assumed a hostile attitude to the development. Among these was Madignano, which had just suffered heavy burdens from the construction of an oratory (already abandoned by 1856) and a new road to neighboring Castelleone. The railway nevertheless reached the comune in 1862 without any station being built.

A railway halt was proposed by the municipal administration in 1993, with feasibility studies beginning that year. While there was initially some controversy in planning the new station with Italy's national railway holding company Ferrovie dello Stato, the comune was eventually granted a definitive construction permit at the end of 1995. The official inauguration took place on September 15, 1996, with the use of a historic train formed by an FS Class 740 steam locomotive with tender and three vintage carriages.

== Train services ==
The station is served by the following services:

- Regional services (Treno regionale) Treviglio - Cremona
