= Borgo San Giacomo =

- Comune
- Comune di Borgo San Giacomo
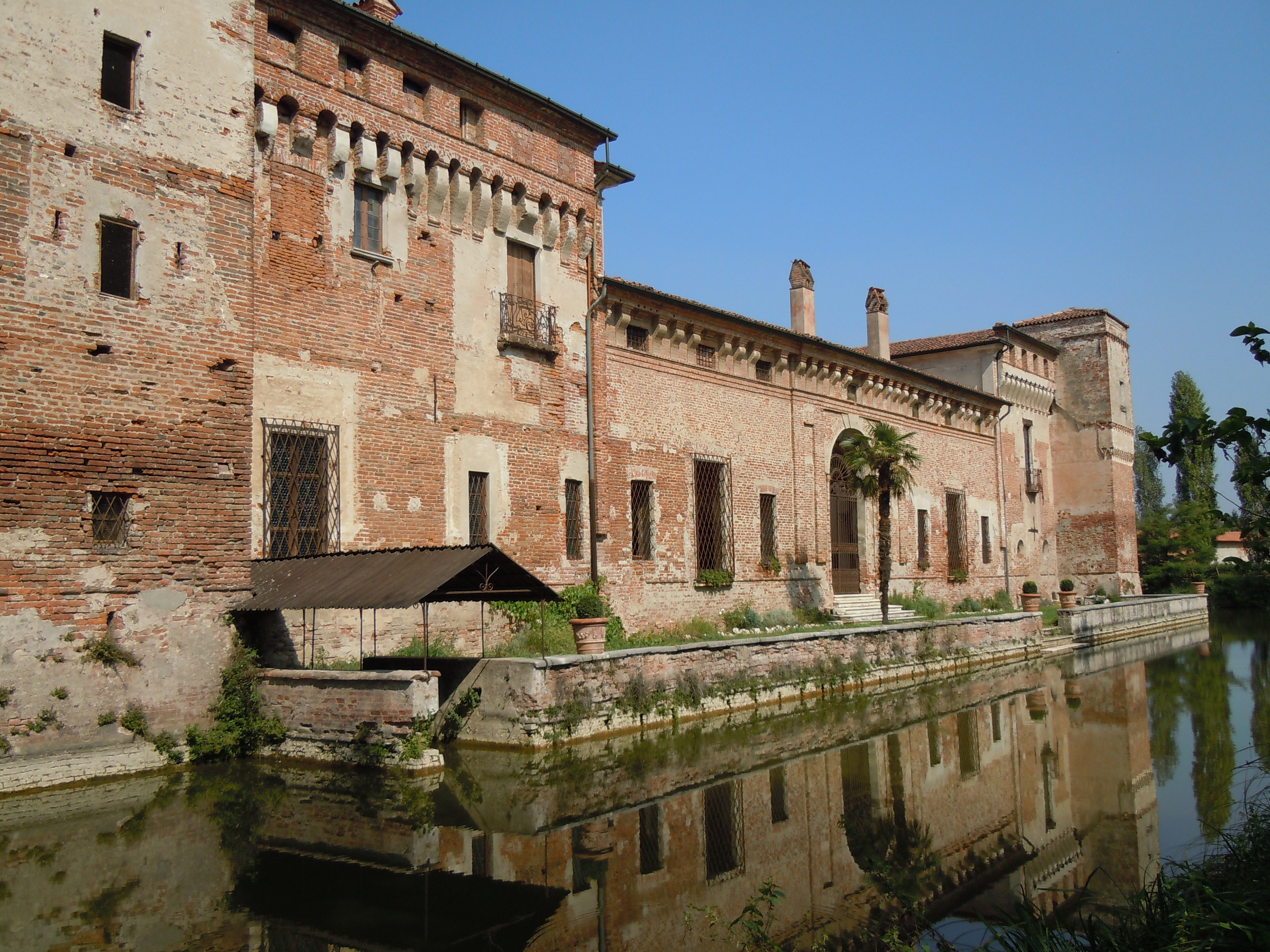
- View of Borgo San Giacomo

- Location within Italy Location within Lombardy
- Coordinates: 45°21′N 9°58′E
- Country: Italy
- Region: Lombardy
- Province: Brescia
- Frazioni: Azzanello (CR), Castelvisconti (CR), Orzinuovi, Quinzano d'Oglio, San Paolo, Verolanuova, Verolavecchia, Villachiara

Area
  - Total: 29 km^{2} (11 sq mi)
- Elevation: 74 m (243 ft)

Population (2011)
  - Total: 5,554
  - Density: 190/km^{2} (500/sq mi)
- Demonym: Gabianesi
- Time zone: UTC+1 (CET)
  - Summer (DST): UTC+2 (CEST)
- Postal code: 25022
- Dialing code: 030
- ISTAT code: 017020
- Patron saint: St. Giacomo il Mayre
- Saint day: 25 July
- Website: Official website

Borgo San Giacomo (Brescian: Borgh San Giàcom) is a comune in the province of Brescia, in Lombardy.
