= Verolavecchia =

Verolavecchia Erölaecia (Lombard)
- Comune
- Comune di Verolavecchia
- Location within Italy Location within Lombardy
- Coordinates: 45°20′N 10°3′E
- Country: Italy
- Region: Lombardy
- Province: Brescia (BS)
- Frazioni: Monticelli d'Oglio, Villanuova

Area
  - Total: 20 km^{2} (7.7 sq mi)

Population (2011)
  - Total: 3,904
  - Density: 200/km^{2} (510/sq mi)
- Demonym: Verolavecchiesi
- Time zone: UTC+1 (CET)
  - Summer (DST): UTC+2 (CEST)
- Postal code: 25029
- Dialing code: 030
- ISTAT code: 017196
- Website: Official website

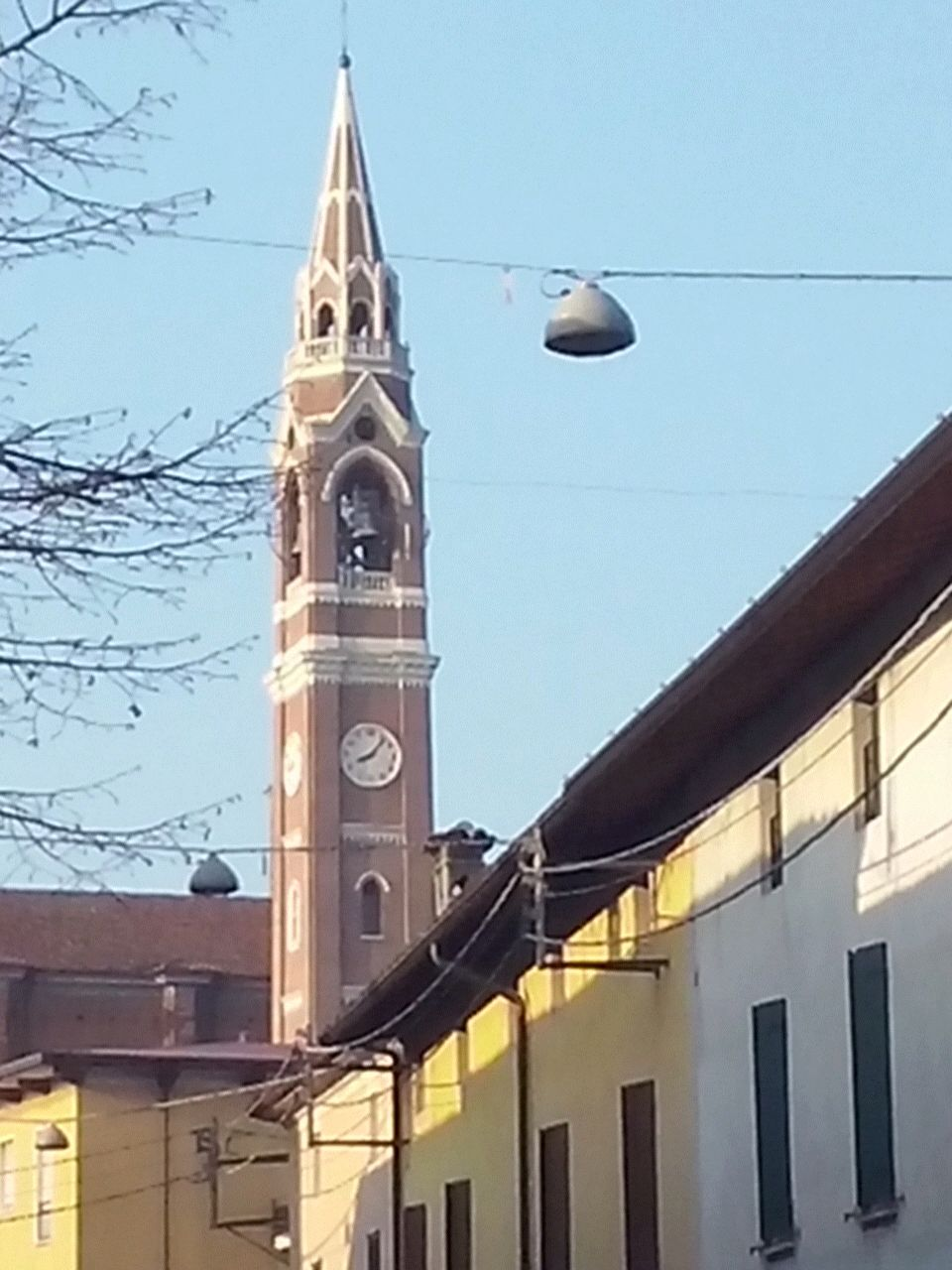

Verolavecchia (Brescian: Erölaecia) is a comune in the province of Brescia, in Lombardy. Bordering communes are Borgo San Giacomo, Corte de' Cortesi con Cignone (CR), Pontevico, Quinzano d'Oglio, Robecco d'Oglio (CR) and Verolanuova. Its coat of arms shows three ears of wheat, the text Vetus Virescit and a white cross on blue.
