= Castelleone railway station =

Railway station serving Castelleone in the region of Lombardy, Northern Italy

Castelleone
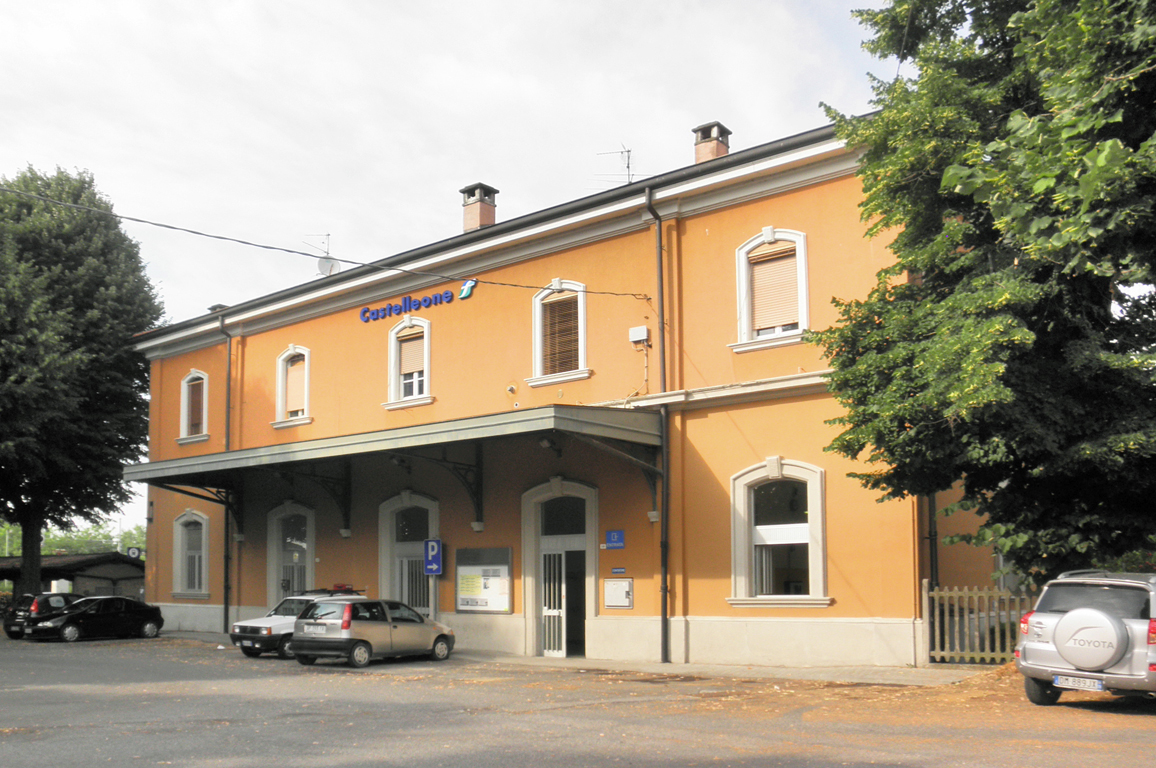
- Castelleone railway station

General information
- Location: Italy
- Coordinates: 45°18′06″N 9°46′04″E
- System: Railway Station
- Owner: Rete Ferroviaria Italiana
- Operator: Trenord
- Line: Treviglio–Cremona
- Platforms: 2

Other information
- Classification: Silver

History
- Opened: 1 January 1863; 163 years ago
Location
- Location within Lombardy Location within Northern Italy Location within Italy

Castelleone railway station is a railway station serving the town and comune of Castelleone in the region of Lombardy, Northern Italy. It is located on the Treviglio–Cremona railway.

The station was opened on January 1, 1863, with the opening of the first section of the Treviglio–Cremona line, which ran from Treviglio to Soresina. Service from Castelleone to Cremona would open with the full inauguration of the Treviglio–Cremona line on May 1, 1863, connecting Cremona to the Milan-Venice line. At the time, the Milan-Venice line passed through Bergamo.

== Train services ==
The station is served by the following services:

- Regional services (Treno regionale) Treviglio - Cremona
