= Grioni =

Grioni is a surname. Notable people with the surname include:

- Marcelo Grioni (born 1966), Argentine football manager and former player
- Pino Grioni (1932–2020), Italian painter, sculptor, and ceramist
