= Bertonico =

Bertonico Bertùnoch, Bertünegh (Lombard)
- Comune
- Comune di Bertonico
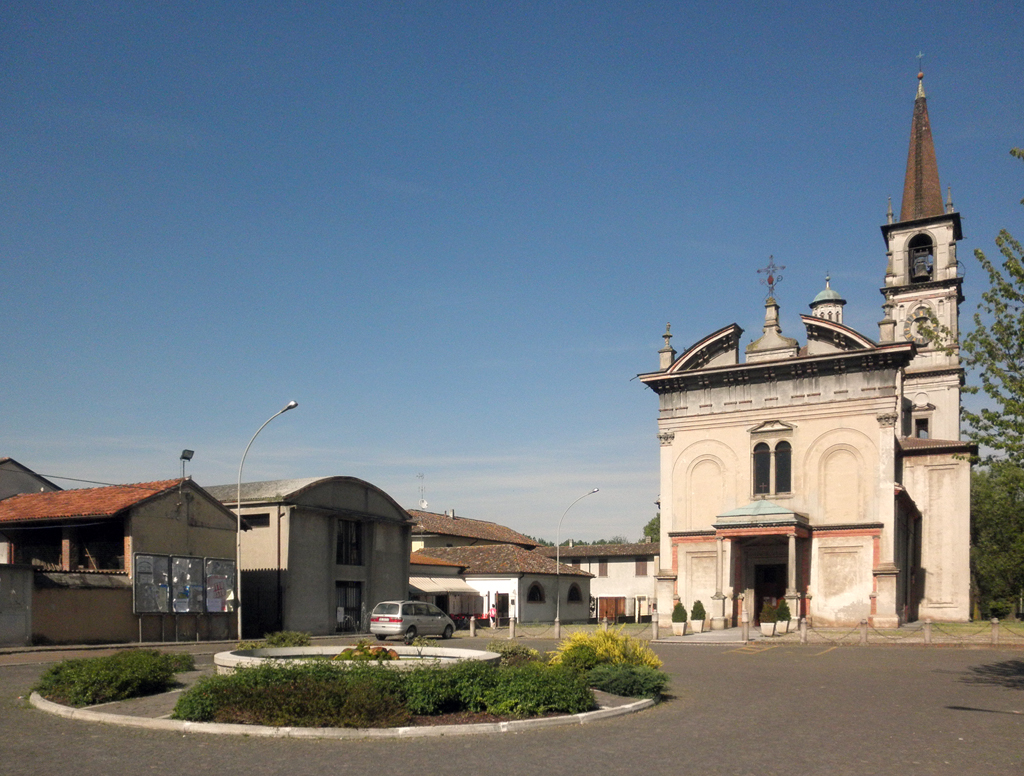
- The central square of Bertonico

- Coat of arms

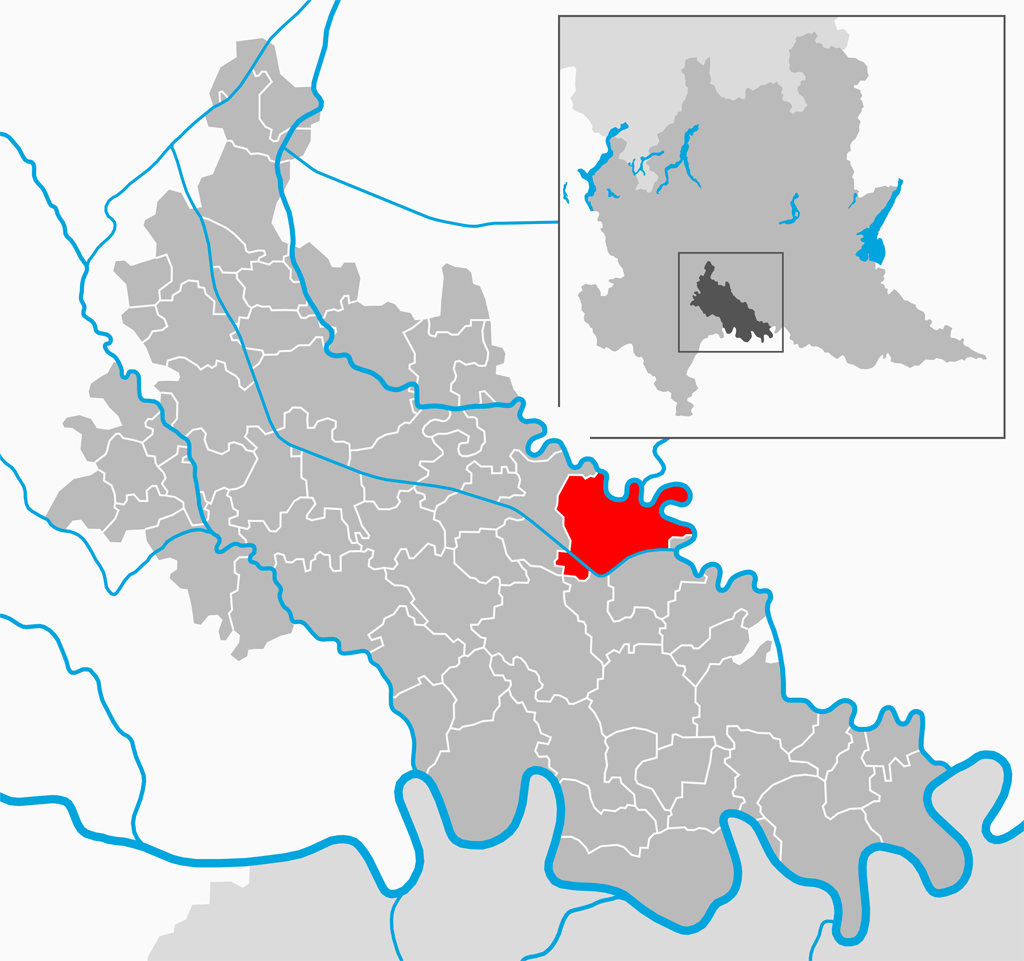

- Location within Italy Location within Lombardy
- Coordinates: 45°14′N 9°40′E
- Country: Italy
- Region: Lombardy
- Province: Lodi (LO)
- Frazioni: Brusada, Campolungo, Colombina, Monticelli

Government
  - Mayor: Verusca Bonvini (Lista Civica "Progetto per Bertonico")

Area
  - Total: 20.2 km^{2} (7.8 sq mi)
- Elevation: 63 m (207 ft)

Population (30 April 2017)
  - Total: 1,124
  - Density: 55.6/km^{2} (144/sq mi)
- Demonym: Bertonicensi
- Time zone: UTC+1 (CET)
  - Summer (DST): UTC+2 (CEST)
- Postal code: 20070
- Dialing code: 0377
- Patron saint: Pope Clement I
- Website: Official website

Bertonico (Lodigiano: Bertùnoch or Bertünegh) is a comune (municipality) in the Province of Lodi in the Italian region Lombardy, located about 45 kilometres (28 mi) southeast of Milan and about 15 kilometres (9 mi) southeast of Lodi.

Bertonico borders the following municipalities: Ripalta Arpina, Moscazzano, Montodine, Turano Lodigiano, Castiglione d'Adda, Gombito, Terranova dei Passerini.

Economy is mostly based on agriculture and animal husbandry.
