= San Giorgio, Casalbuttano =

Roman Catholic church in Cremona province, Italy

Coordinates: 45°15′04.6″N 9°57′54.8″E

San Giorgio is a late-Renaissance-style, Roman Catholic parish church located in Casalbuttano, Province of Cremona, region of Lombardy, Italy.

== History ==
An aedicule-chapel at the site was present since the 12th-century; by the mid 15th century a church was present. By 16th century chapels were present in the church. In 1567, an adjacent cemetery was established.

In 1581 an organ by the Antenati family of Brescia was built and the church was consecrated in 1600. The belltower measuring 65 meters in height was erected in 1624 -1638. The facade was built by followers of Giuseppe Dattero, but replaced in 1920 by Cesare Nava.

Inside, the main altarpiece depicts a St George and the Dragon (1593) by Marcantonio Mainardi. Other works, including the stucco polyptych, near the altar (1759) are by Giacomo Guerrini.

To the right of the entrances are a canvas depicting St Catherine of Alexandria (1612) by Andrea Mainardi, transferred to this church from the Franciscan church of San Salvatore in 1945; a Madonna in Gloria (first half of 17th-century) a copy of Giulio Campi's main altarpiece at San Sigismondo of Cremona, copy attributed to Stefano Lambri; Marriage of the Virgin by Carlo Landriani; a Madonna of the Rosary with Sts Dominic and Catherine Domenico e Santa Caterina (1652) by Luigi Miradori; and a St Stephen with Sts Bernard and Bernardino (1628) by Marcantonio Mainardi, derived from the Franciscan Convent of San Salvatore.

Over the door at the end of the right nave is a painting of L’Addolorata by Marcantonio Ghislina.

In the chapel on the left are a number of oil paintings, including one depicting St Carlo Borromeo granting communion to those afflicted with the Plague (1840) by Carlo Landriani; a Crucifixion with Saints Francis, Antony, and Bernardino of Siena (17th-century) attributed to Ermenegildo Lambri; a Flight to Egypt, copy of a canvas by Alessandro Turchi; an Annunciation attributed to Ermenegildo Lodi; and a Baptism of Christ (1874) by Giuseppina Baccini.

In the chapel of the Grotto of Lourdes, is a canvas depicting St Francis receiving Stigmata (17th-century), once attributed to Europa Anguissola, also deriving from the church of the Convent of San Salvatore; Death of St Francis Xavier (17th-century); and a Christ carrying Cross (15th-century) attributed to Filippo Mazzola.
