= Fiesco =

Fiesco may refer to:

== Places ==
Italy

- Fiesco, Lombardy, a comune in the Province of Cremona

== People ==
- Giovanni Luigi Fieschi (c. 1522 – 1547), a Genovese nobleman and subject of Schiller's drama

== Entertainment ==
- Fiesco (play) (de:Die Verschwörung des Fiesco zu Genua), a drama by German writer Friedrich Schiller
