= Casalbuttano ed Uniti =

- Comune
- Comune di Casalbuttano ed Uniti
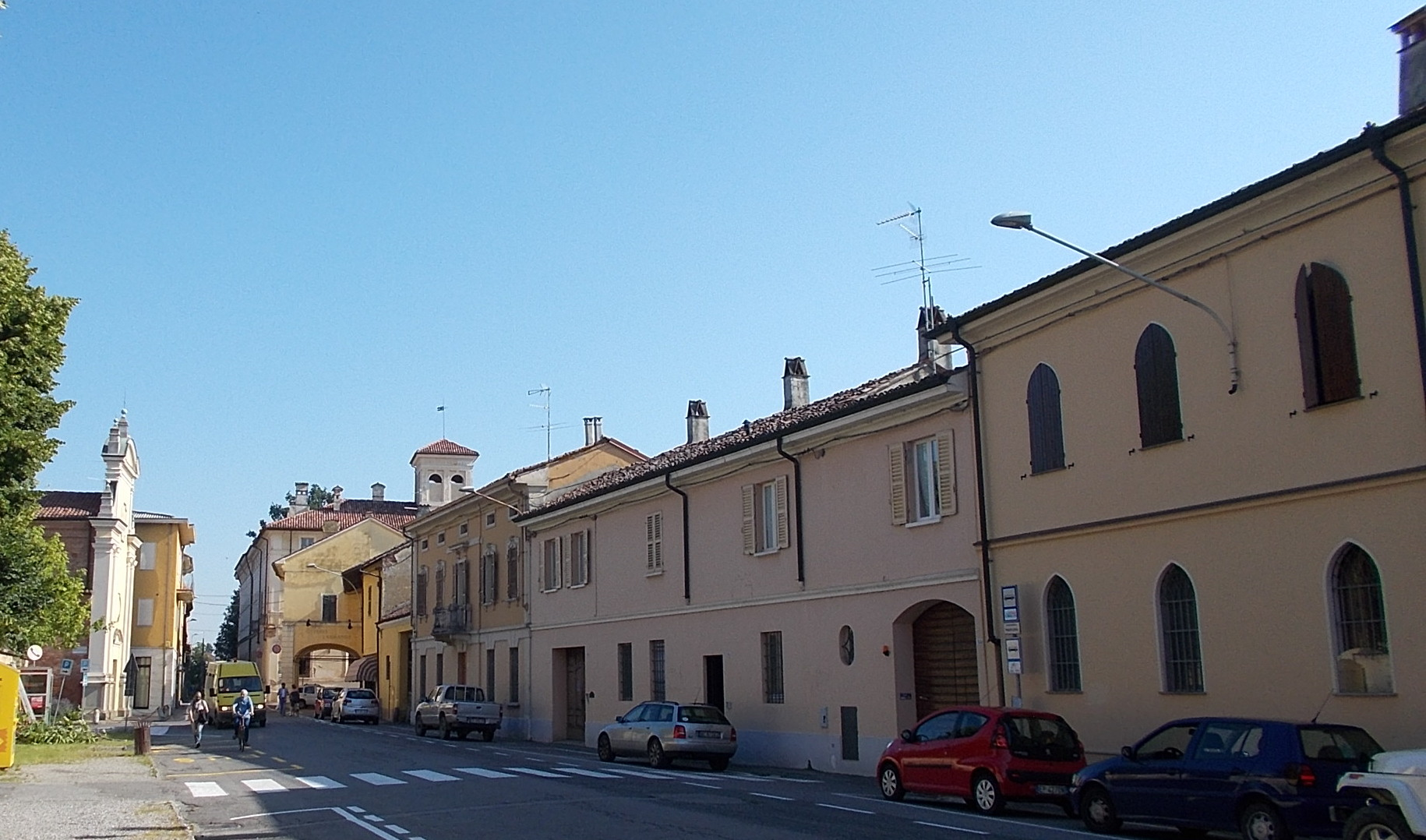

- Location within Italy Location within Lombardy
- Coordinates: 45°15′N 9°58′E
- Country: Italy
- Region: Lombardy
- Province: Cremona (CR)

Government
  - Mayor: Gian Pietro Garoli

Area
  - Total: 23.2 km^{2} (9.0 sq mi)
- Elevation: 60 m (200 ft)

Population (31 May 2017)
  - Total: 3,903
  - Density: 168/km^{2} (436/sq mi)
- Demonym: Casalbuttanesi
- Time zone: UTC+1 (CET)
  - Summer (DST): UTC+2 (CEST)
- Postal code: 26011
- Dialing code: 0374
- Website: Official website

Casalbuttano ed Uniti (Cremunés: Cazalbütàan) is a comune (municipality) in the Province of Cremona in the Italian region Lombardy, located about 70 kilometres (43 mi) southeast of Milan and about 14 kilometres (9 mi) northwest of Cremona.

Casalbuttano ed Uniti borders the following municipalities: Bordolano, Casalmorano, Castelverde, Castelvisconti, Corte de' Cortesi con Cignone, Olmeneta, Paderno Ponchielli, Pozzaglio ed Uniti.

== Transportation ==
Casalbuttano has a railway station on the Treviglio–Cremona line.

== People ==
- Andrea Guarneri
- Ferruccio Ghinaglia
- Ulisse Gualtieri
- Stefano Jacini (politician, born 1826)
- Giuseppe Piazzi (bishop)

== Religion ==
=== Churches ===
- San Francesco, Casalbuttano
- San Giorgio, Casalbuttano
