= Olmeneta railway station =

Railway station serving Olmeneta in the region of Lombardy, Northern Italy

Olmeneta
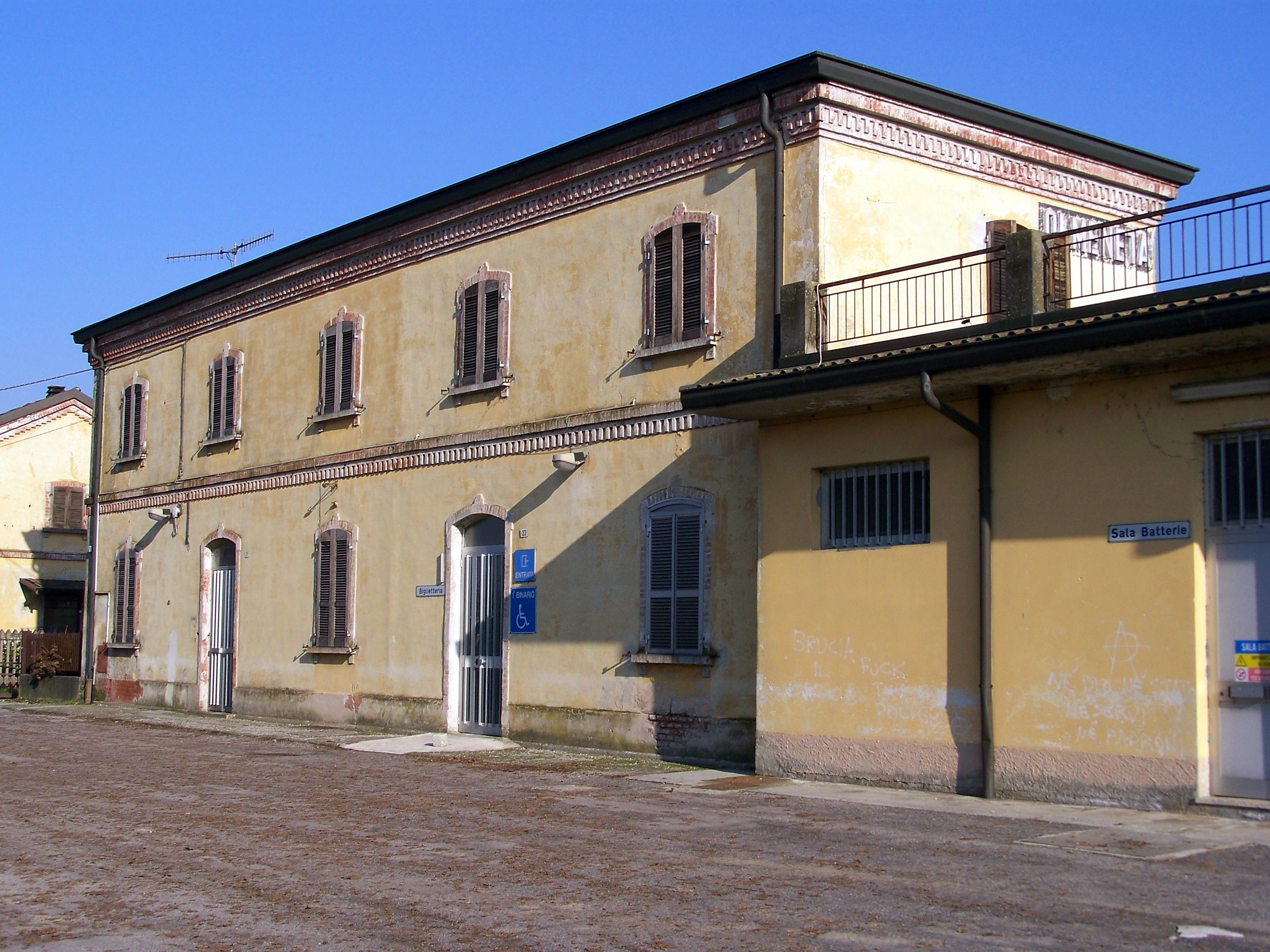
- Olmeneta railway station

General information
- Location: Italy
- Coordinates: 45°13′52″N 10°01′55″E
- Elevation: 55 metres (180 ft)
- Owner: Rete Ferroviaria Italiana
- Operator: Trenord
- Lines: Brescia–Cremona; Treviglio–Cremona
- Platforms: 3

Other information
- Classification: Bronze

History
- Opened: 1 May 1863; 163 years ago
Location
- Location within Lombardy Location within Northern Italy Location within Italy

Olmeneta railway station is a railway station serving the town and comune of Olmeneta in the region of Lombardy, Northern Italy. The station is located at the junction of the Brescia–Cremona and Treviglio–Cremona railway lines.

The station was opened on May 1, 1863, at the inauguration of the Treviglio–Cremona line, which connected Cremona to the Milan-Venice line, which then passed through Bergamo.

== Train services ==
The station is served by the following services:

- Regional services (Treno regionale) Brescia - Cremona
- Regional services (Treno regionale) Treviglio - Cremona
