= Bordolano =

Bordolano Burdulàan (Lombard)
- Comune
- Comune di Bordolano
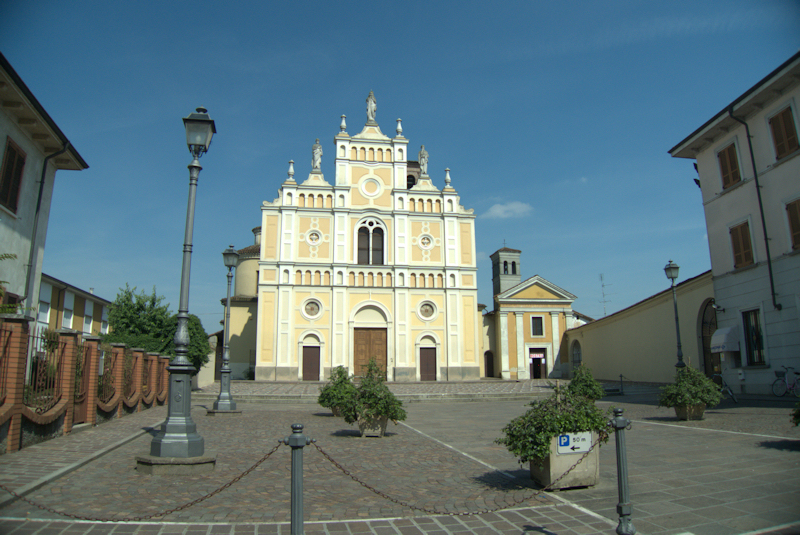
- Parish church, Bordolano.

- Location within Italy Location within Lombardy
- Coordinates: 45°17′N 9°59′E
- Country: Italy
- Region: Lombardy
- Province: Cremona (CR)

Government
  - Mayor: Davide Brena

Area
  - Total: 8.1 km^{2} (3.1 sq mi)
- Elevation: 64 m (210 ft)

Population (28 February 2017)
  - Total: 618
  - Density: 76/km^{2} (200/sq mi)
- Demonym: Bordolanesi
- Time zone: UTC+1 (CET)
  - Summer (DST): UTC+2 (CEST)
- Postal code: 26020
- Dialing code: 0372
- Website: Official website

Bordolano (Soresinese: Burdulàa) is a comune (municipality) in the Province of Cremona in the Italian region Lombardy, located about 70 kilometres (43 mi) southeast of Milan and about 15 kilometres (9 mi) north of Cremona.

Bordolano borders the following municipalities: Casalbuttano ed Uniti, Castelvisconti, Corte de' Cortesi con Cignone, Quinzano d'Oglio.
