= Olmeneta =

Olmeneta Ulmenéeda (Lombard)
- Comune
- Comune di Olmeneta
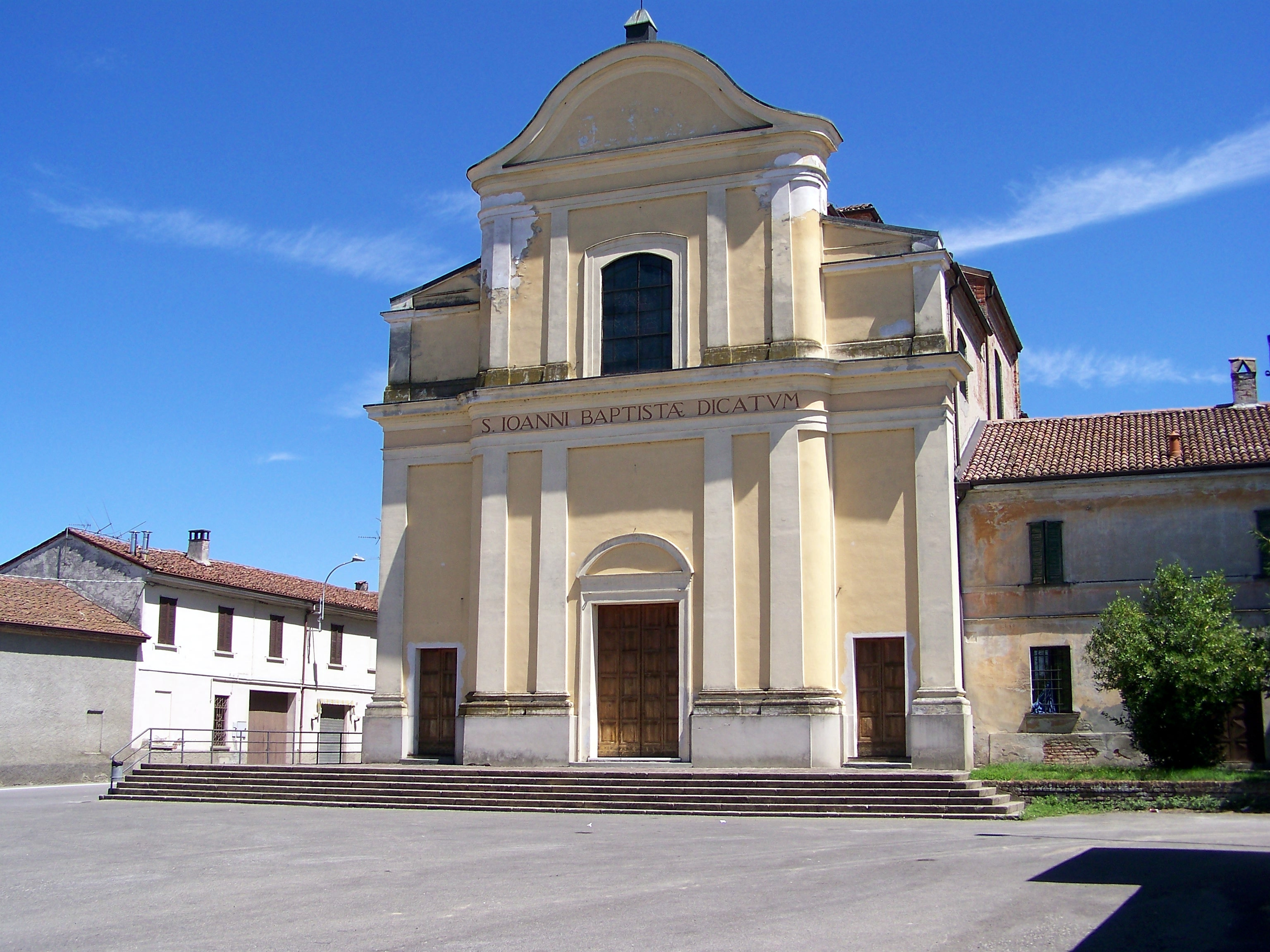
- San Giovanni Battista, Olmeneta

- Location within Italy Location within Lombardy
- Coordinates: 45°14′N 10°1′E
- Country: Italy
- Region: Lombardy
- Province: Cremona (CR)

Government
  - Mayor: Renzo Felisari

Area
  - Total: 9.2 km^{2} (3.6 sq mi)
- Elevation: 55 m (180 ft)

Population (28 February 2017)
  - Total: 947
  - Density: 100/km^{2} (270/sq mi)
- Time zone: UTC+1 (CET)
  - Summer (DST): UTC+2 (CEST)
- Postal code: 26010
- Dialing code: 0372

Olmeneta (Cremunés: Ulmenéeda) is a comune (municipality) in the Province of Cremona in the Italian region Lombardy, located about 70 kilometres (43 mi) southeast of Milan and about 11 kilometres (7 mi) north of Cremona.

Olmeneta borders the following municipalities: Casalbuttano ed Uniti, Castelverde, Corte de' Cortesi con Cignone, Pozzaglio ed Uniti, Robecco d'Oglio.

San Giovanni Battista is the Roman Catholic parish church of the town.

== Transportation ==
Olmeneta is served by the Olmeneta railway station located at the junction of the lines Brescia–Cremona and Treviglio–Cremona.
