= Ferruccio Ghinaglia =

Italian politician (1899–1921)

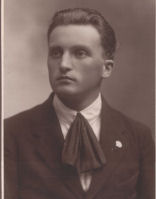

Ferruccio Ghinaglia (29 September 1899 – 21 April 1921) was an Italian Marxist revolutionary, active in the second decade of the 20th century and killed by political enemies in 1921.

Ghinaglia was born in Casalbuttano ed Uniti in the Province of Cremona. He was not of a rich family, but distinguished himself in the high school in Cremona as a fervent Socialist and anti-militarist through his writings in the pages of the school paper Lo Studente (The Student), which caused him some trouble with the police because this was during the First World War.

He arrived in Pavia in 1917 as a student of medicine and earned himself a place in the Ghislieri College which is linked to the University of Pavia, but little afterwards he was called to carry out military service. He managed to reestablish a link with his Cremonese contacts and resumed his place in the Socialist Youth.

After he had moved back to Pavia, he became the leader of the left-wing split of the Socialist Party and then the secretary of the newborn Communist Party of Italy (later to be known as the Italian Communist Party) and founder and director of the Pavesan Federation of that party in 1921.

Ghinaglia was a person who asserted the necessity of resistance to the Fascist violence. On the 21 April 1921, Ghinaglia fell victim to a Fascist vendetta and was found dead by a gunshot wound to the head on the bridge overlooking the Ticino River. Though Ghinaglia was dead, Benito Mussolini still found difficulty in suppressing the anti-Fascist movement.

His killing generating popular disdain that culminated in a massive funeral that marched throughout the streets of Pavia the day after because of his political assassination (which is still held as such even today).

He is remembered by toponyms in the cities of Pavia and Cremona and also by the Communist Refoundation Party and other political groups of the Left.

== Sources ==
- Alcune biografie di antifascisti cremonesi: Ferruccio Ghinaglia
- Capitoli di storia militante: Ferruccio Ghinaglia
- 82 anni dall'uccisione di Ferruccio Ghinaglia
