= Azzanello =

Azzanello Sanél (Lombard)
- Comune
- Comune di Azzanello
- Location within Italy Location within Lombardy
- Coordinates: 45°19′N 9°55′E
- Country: Italy
- Region: Lombardy
- Province: Cremona (CR)

Government
  - Mayor: Arsenio Molaschi

Area
  - Total: 11.12 km^{2} (4.29 sq mi)
- Elevation: 68 m (223 ft)

Population (30 April 2017)
  - Total: 636
  - Density: 57.2/km^{2} (148/sq mi)
- Demonym: Azzanellesi
- Time zone: UTC+1 (CET)
  - Summer (DST): UTC+2 (CEST)
- Postal code: 26010
- Dialing code: 0374
- Website: Official website

Azzanello (Cremunés: Sanél) is a comune (municipality) in the Province of Cremona in the Italian region Lombardy, located about 60 kilometres (37 mi) southeast of Milan and about 20 kilometres (12 mi) northwest of Cremona.

Azzanello borders the following municipalities: Borgo San Giacomo, Casalmorano, Castelvisconti, Genivolta, Villachiara.
