= Madignano =

Madignano Madignàa (Lombard)
- Comune
- Comune di Madignano
- Location within Italy Location within Lombardy
- Coordinates: 45°21′N 9°43′E
- Country: Italy
- Region: Lombardy
- Province: Province of Cremona (CR)
- Frazioni: Ripalta Vecchia

Government
  - Mayor: Elena Festari

Area
  - Total: 10.8 km^{2} (4.2 sq mi)
- Elevation: 72 m (236 ft)

Population (Dec. 2006)
  - Total: 2,977
  - Density: 276/km^{2} (714/sq mi)
- Demonym: Madignanesi
- Time zone: UTC+1 (CET)
  - Summer (DST): UTC+2 (CEST)
- Postal code: 26020
- Dialing code: 0373
- Website: Official website

Madignano (Cremasco: Madignàa) is a comune (municipality) in the Province of Cremona in the Italian region Lombardy, located about 45 kilometres (28 mi) southeast of Milan and about 35 kilometres (22 mi) northwest of Cremona. As of 31 December 2006, it had a population of 2,977 and an area of 10.8 square kilometres (4.2 mi^{2}).

The municipality of Madignano contains the frazione (subdivision) Ripalta Vecchia.

Madignano borders the following municipalities: Castelleone, Crema, Izano, Ripalta Arpina, Ripalta Cremasca.

== Transportation ==
Madignano is served by the Madignano railway station on the Treviglio–Cremona line.

== Demographic evolution ==
Historical population

Year	Pop.	±%
1861	1,399	—
1871	1,473	+5.3%
1881	1,525	+3.5%
1901	1,644	+7.8%
1911	1,813	+10.3%

Year	Pop.	±%
1921	1,881	+3.8%
1931	1,838	−2.3%
1936	1,806	−1.7%
1951	1,855	+2.7%
1961	1,509	−18.7%

Year	Pop.	±%
1971	1,651	+9.4%
1981	1,895	+14.8%
1991	2,350	+24.0%
2001	2,879	+22.5%

Source: Data from ISTAT
