= Formigara =

Formigara Furmighèra (Lombard)
- Comune
- Comune di Formigara
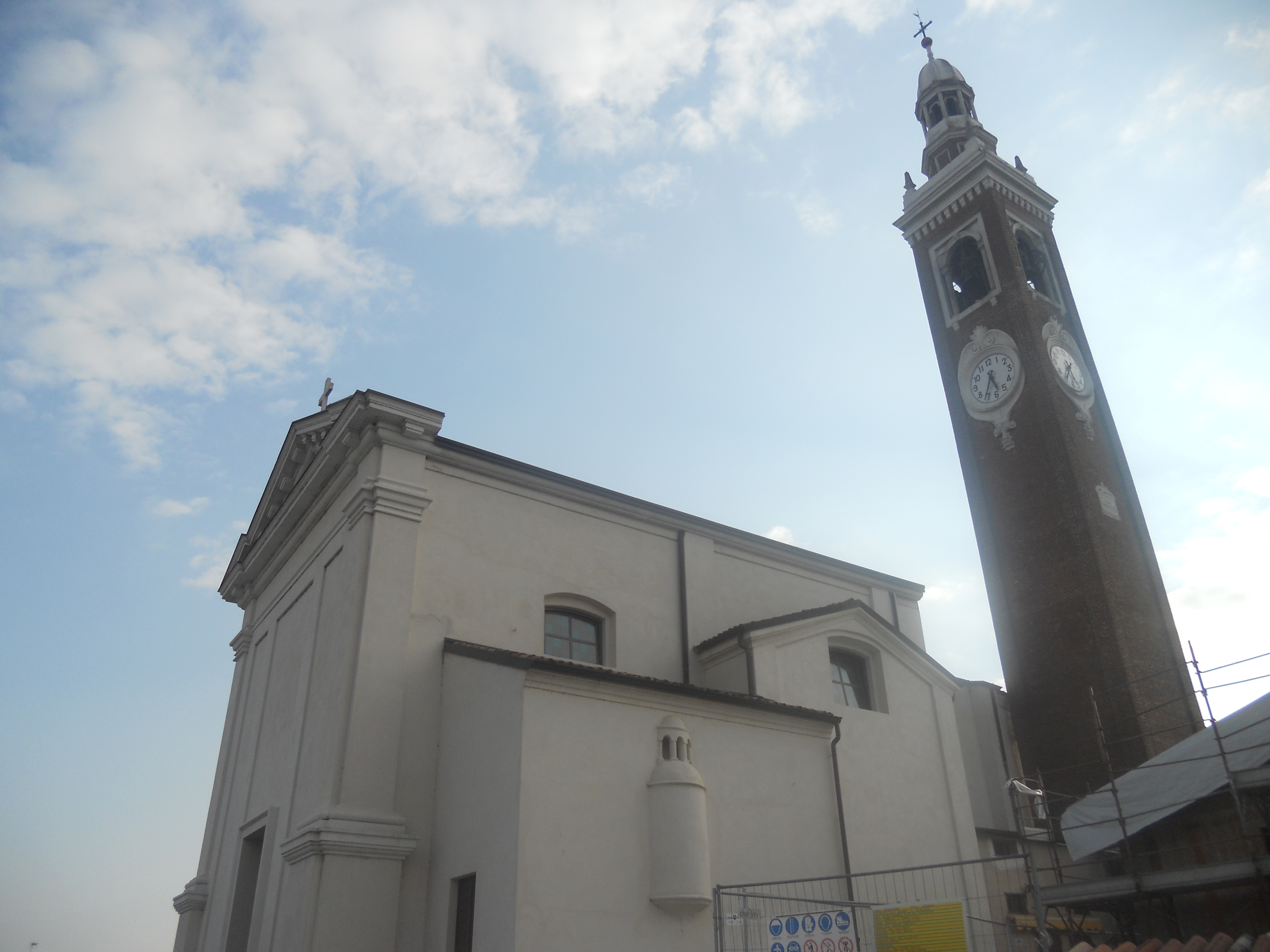

- Location within Italy Location within Lombardy
- Coordinates: 45°14′N 9°46′E
- Country: Italy
- Region: Lombardy
- Province: Cremona (CR)

Government
  - Mayor: William Mario Vailati

Area
  - Total: 12.64 km^{2} (4.88 sq mi)
- Elevation: 56 m (184 ft)

Population (31 August 2017)
  - Total: 1,023
  - Density: 80.93/km^{2} (209.6/sq mi)
- Demonym: Formigaresi
- Time zone: UTC+1 (CET)
  - Summer (DST): UTC+2 (CEST)
- Postal code: 26020
- Dialing code: 0374
- Website: Official website

Formigara (locally Furmighèra) is a comune (municipality) in the Province of Cremona in the Italian region Lombardy, located about 50 kilometres (31 mi) southeast of Milan and about 25 kilometres (16 mi) northwest of Cremona.

Formigara borders the following municipalities: Castelgerundo, Castiglione d'Adda, Gombito, Pizzighettone, San Bassano.
