= Genivolta =

Genivolta Geniólta (Lombard)
- Comune
- Comune di Genivolta
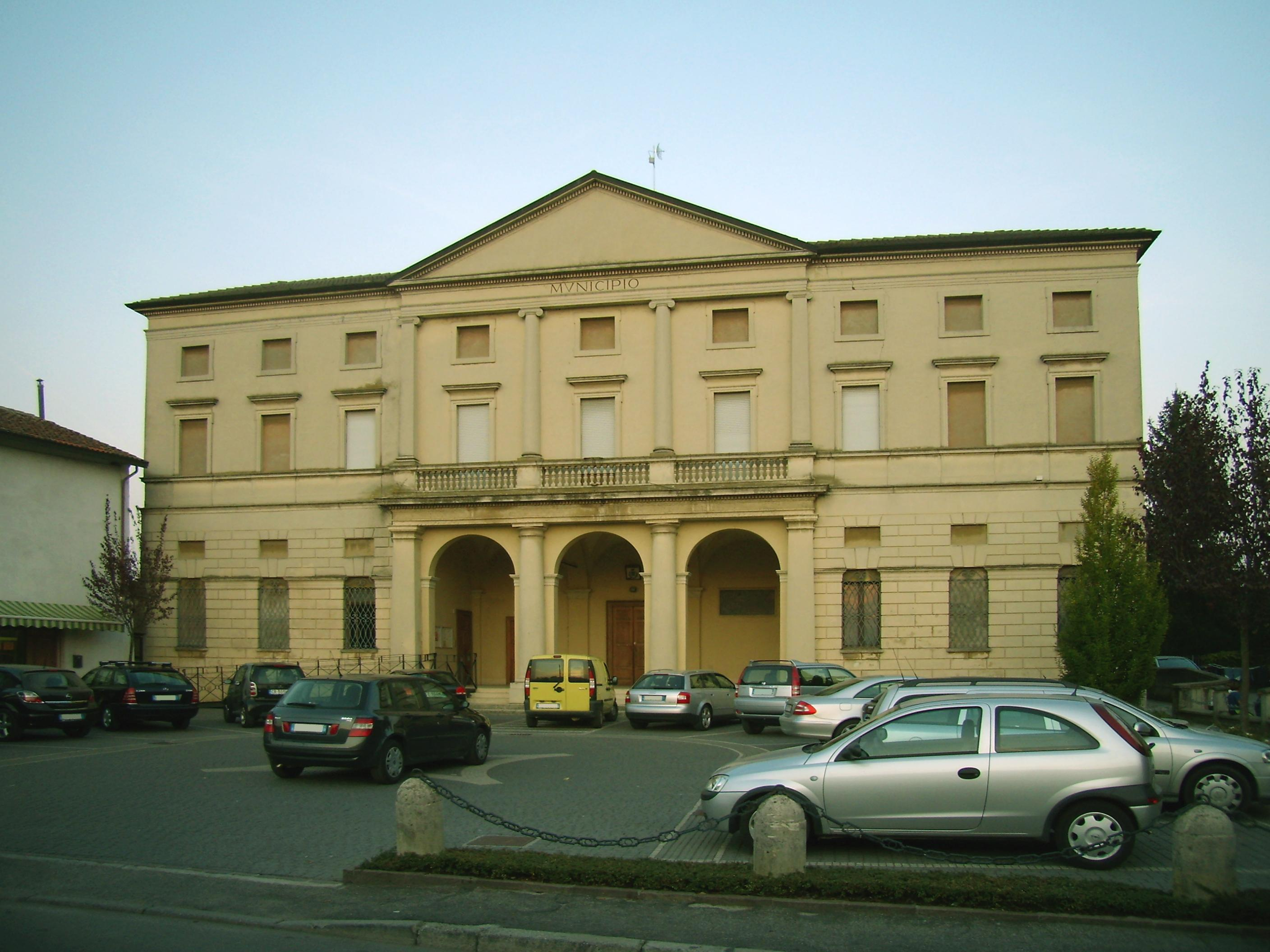
- Villa Settala, the current town hall.

- Coat of arms

- Location within Italy Location within Lombardy
- Coordinates: 45°20′N 9°53′E
- Country: Italy
- Region: Lombardy
- Province: Cremona (CR)

Government
  - Mayor: Giampaolo Lazzari

Area
  - Total: 18.7 km^{2} (7.2 sq mi)
- Elevation: 70 m (230 ft)

Population (28 February 2017)
  - Total: 1,182
  - Density: 63.2/km^{2} (164/sq mi)
- Demonym: Genivoltesi
- Time zone: UTC+1 (CET)
  - Summer (DST): UTC+2 (CEST)
- Postal code: 26020
- Dialing code: 0374
- Patron saint: St. Lawrence
- Saint day: 10 August
- Website: Official website

Genivolta (Soresinese: Geniólta) is a comune (municipality) in the Province of Cremona in the Italian region Lombardy, located about 60 kilometres (37 mi) east of Milan and about 25 kilometres (16 mi) northwest of Cremona.

Genivolta borders the following municipalities: Azzanello, Casalmorano, Cumignano sul Naviglio, Soncino, Soresina, Villachiara.
