= San Francesco, Casalbuttano =

Church in Casalbuttano ed Uniti, Italy

Coordinates: 45.251344°N 9.961127°E

San Francesco is a Baroque-style, Roman Catholic church located in Casalbuttano, Province of Cremona, region of Lombardy, Italy.

== History ==
The present building began in the 17th century as an oratory associated with the Confraternita delle Sacre Stimmate di San Francesco (Confraternity of the Holy Stigmata of St Francis of Assisi). The design was due to architect Francesco Pescaroli. The church has a single tall nave. Inside to the right is a canvas depicting the Transit of St Francis Xavier attributed to Francesco Boccaccino, next is a depiction of the Martyrdom of St Bartholomew, and next a canvas depicting Crowned Virgin with St Maurice martyr, St Antony Bishop of Florence, and Sant’Isidoro. To the right of the altar is an oil canvas depicting the Madonna della Rosa, donated in 1672 by Marchese Camillo Schinchinelli. The painting has been attributed by Longhi to Francesco Mazzola. The main altar has statues of St Lawrence and St Anthony of Padua, to the left is a statue of St Francis surprised by an angel (1666).
