= Pino Grioni =

American painter (1932–2020)

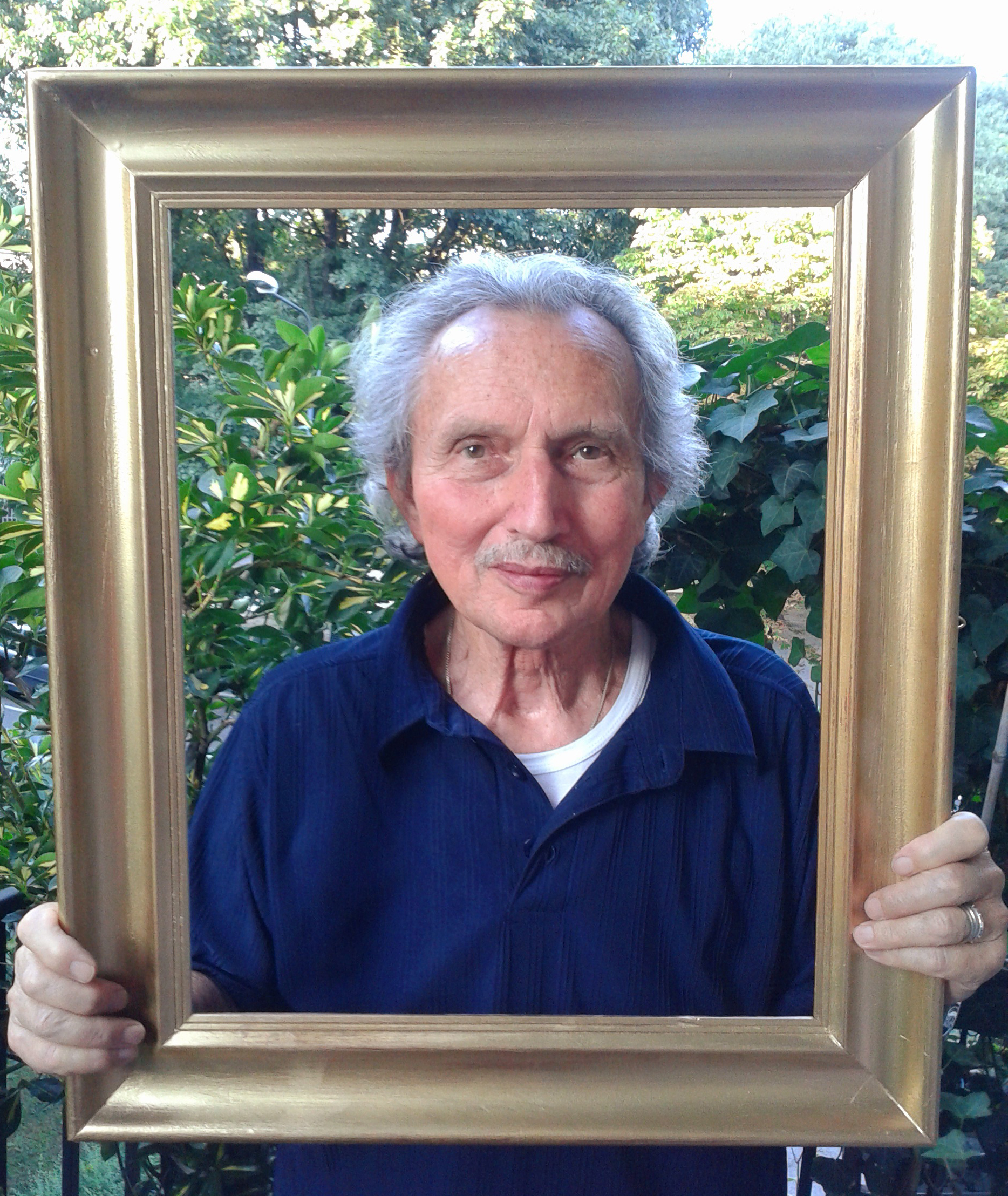
- Born: 10 May 1932; Castiglione d'Adda, Province of Lodi, Italy
- Died: 30 July 2020 (aged 88); Milan, Italy
- Occupation(s): Painter, sculptor, ceramist

Pino Grioni (10 May 1932 – 30 July 2020) was an Italian painter, sculptor and ceramist.
