= San Giovanni Battista, Olmeneta =

Church in Olmeneta, Italy

Coordinates: 45.235254°N 10.020095°E

San Giovanni Battista is a Roman Catholic parish church located in the town of Olmeneta in the province of Cremona, region of Lombardy, Italy.

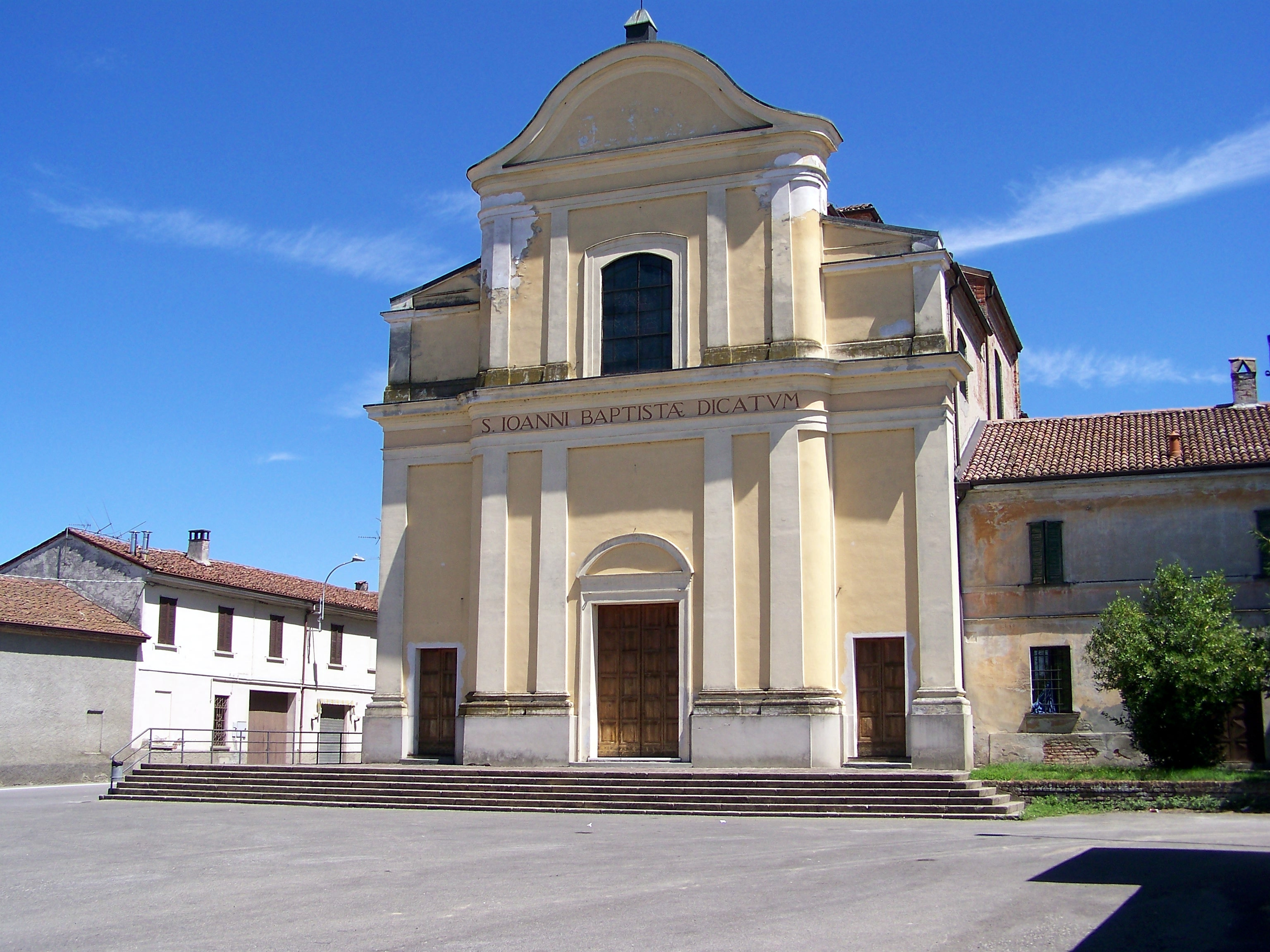
San Giovanni Battista parish church.

== History ==
The church was rebuilt in the late 19th through 20th century, but retains the earlier Baroque architecture influence – for example, the facade with rounded tympanum.
