= Gombito =

Gombito Gùmbet (Lombard)
- Comune
- Comune di Gombito
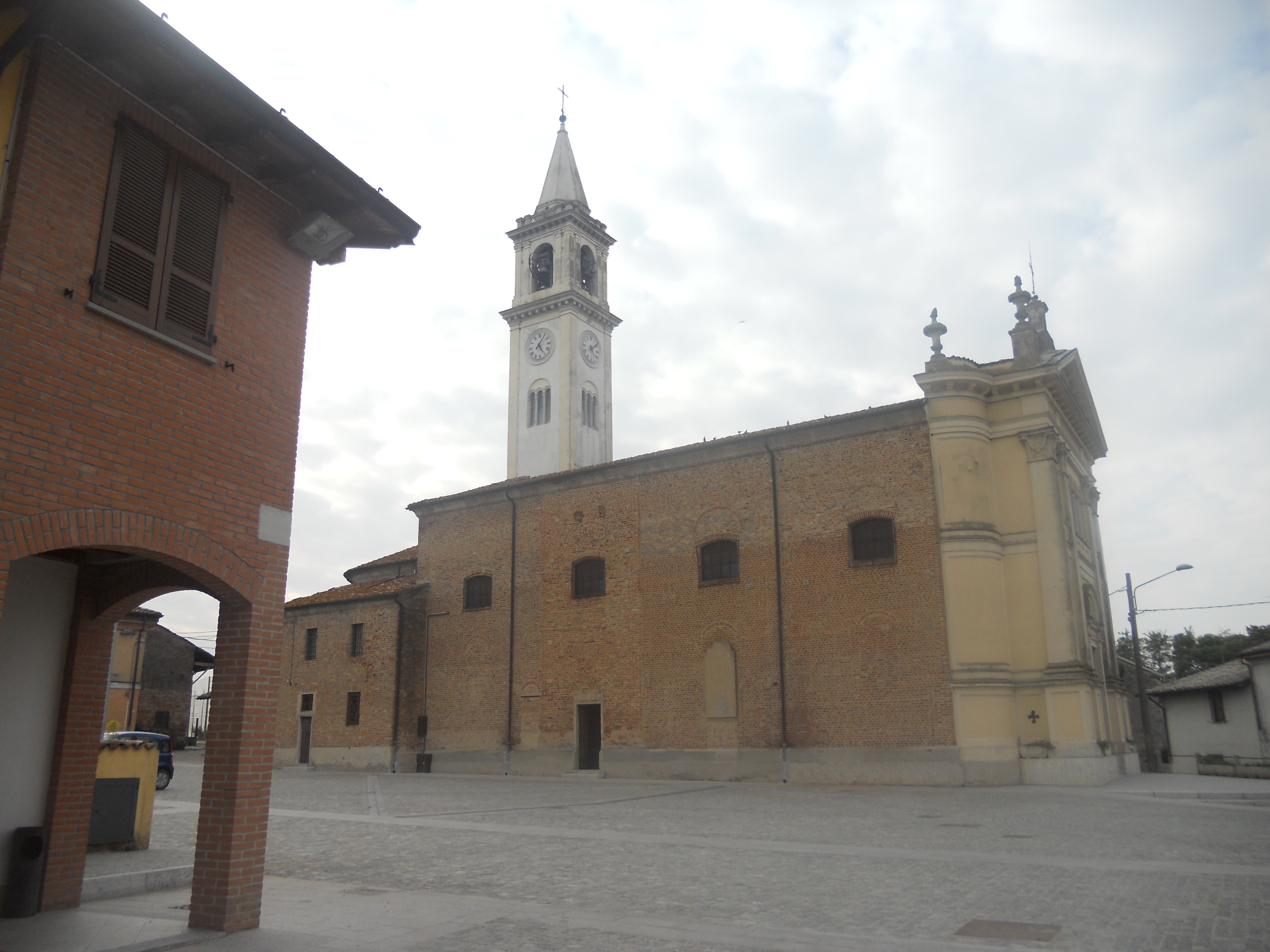

- Location within Italy Location within Lombardy
- Coordinates: 45°16′N 9°44′E
- Country: Italy
- Region: Lombardy
- Province: Cremona (CR)

Government
  - Mayor: Massimo Caravaggio

Area
  - Total: 9.13 km^{2} (3.53 sq mi)
- Elevation: 65 m (213 ft)

Population (31 August 2017)
  - Total: 634
  - Density: 69.4/km^{2} (180/sq mi)
- Demonym: Gombitesi
- Time zone: UTC+1 (CET)
  - Summer (DST): UTC+2 (CEST)
- Postal code: 26020
- Dialing code: 0374
- Website: Official website

Gombito (Cremasco: Gùmbet) is a comune (municipality) in the Province of Cremona in the Italian region Lombardy, located about 50 kilometres (31 mi) southeast of Milan and about 30 kilometres (19 mi) northwest of Cremona.

Gombito borders the following municipalities: Bertonico, Castelleone, Castiglione d'Adda, Formigara, Ripalta Arpina, San Bassano.
