= San Giacomo e Filippo, Corte de' Cortesi =

Church in Corte de' Cortesi con Cignone, Italy

San Giacomo e Filippo is a Neoclassical-style, Roman Catholic church located in the town of Corte de' Cortesi con Cignone, province of Cremona, region of Lombardy, Italy.

A church at the site is documented since the 16th century. Construction of the present church began in 1772, and was completed in the 19th century under Luigi Voghera.
