= Castelvisconti =

Castelvisconti Castelviscùunt (Lombard)
- Comune
- Comune di Castelvisconti
- Location within Italy Location within Lombardy
- Coordinates: 45°18′N 9°56′E
- Country: Italy
- Region: Lombardy
- Province: Cremona (CR)
- Frazioni: Campagna

Government
  - Mayor: Alberto Sisti

Area
  - Total: 9.76 km^{2} (3.77 sq mi)
- Elevation: 66 m (217 ft)

Population (30 June 2017)
  - Total: 294
  - Density: 30.1/km^{2} (78.0/sq mi)
- Time zone: UTC+1 (CET)
  - Summer (DST): UTC+2 (CEST)
- Postal code: 26010
- Dialing code: 0374
- Website: Official website

Castelvisconti (Soresinese: Castelviscùunt) is a comune (municipality) in the Province of Cremona in the Italian region Lombardy, located about 60 kilometres (37 mi) southeast of Milan and about 20 kilometres (12 mi) northwest of Cremona.

Castelvisconti borders the following municipalities: Azzanello, Bordolano, Borgo San Giacomo, Casalbuttano ed Uniti, Casalmorano, Quinzano d'Oglio.

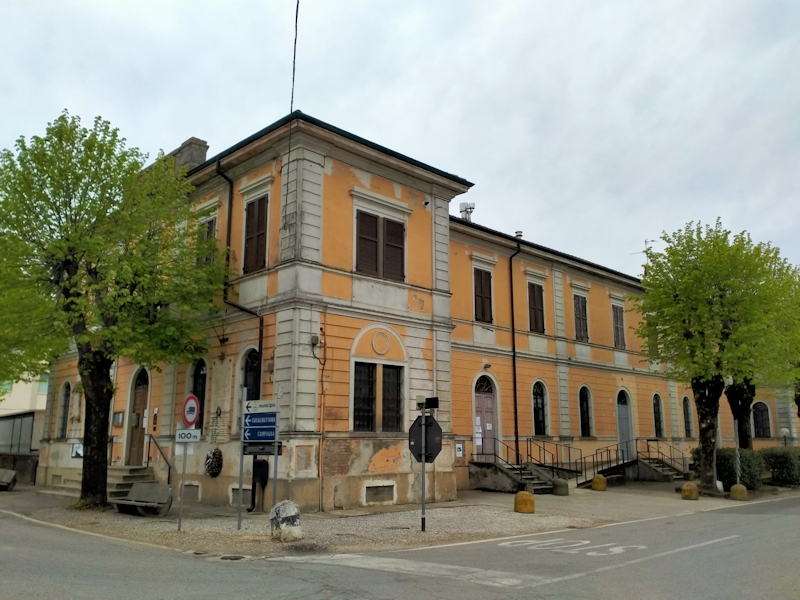
Castelvisconti town hall
