= Carlo Landriani =

Italian painter

Carlo Landriani (1807–1875) was an Italian painter active in Lombardy, known for his historical and sacred subjects.
