= Salvirola =

Salvirola Salviróla (Lombard)
- Comune
- Comune di Salvirola
- Location within Italy Location within Lombardy
- Coordinates: 45°21′N 9°47′E
- Country: Italy
- Region: Lombardy
- Province: Cremona (CR)

Government
  - Mayor: Nicola Marani

Area
  - Total: 7.36 km^{2} (2.84 sq mi)
- Elevation: 74 m (243 ft)

Population (30 September 2016)
  - Total: 1,161
  - Density: 158/km^{2} (409/sq mi)
- Demonym: Salvirolesi
- Time zone: UTC+1 (CET)
  - Summer (DST): UTC+2 (CEST)
- Postal code: 26010
- Dialing code: 0373
- Website: Official website

Salvirola (Cremasco: Salviróla) is a comune (municipality) in the Province of Cremona in the Italian region Lombardy, located about 50 kilometres (31 mi) east of Milan and about 30 kilometres (19 mi) northwest of Cremona.

Salvirola borders the following municipalities: Cumignano sul Naviglio, Fiesco, Izano, Romanengo, Ticengo, Trigolo.
