= Ripalta Cremasca =

Ripalta Cremasca Riultélina Grasa (Lombard)
- Comune
- Comune di Ripalta Cremasca
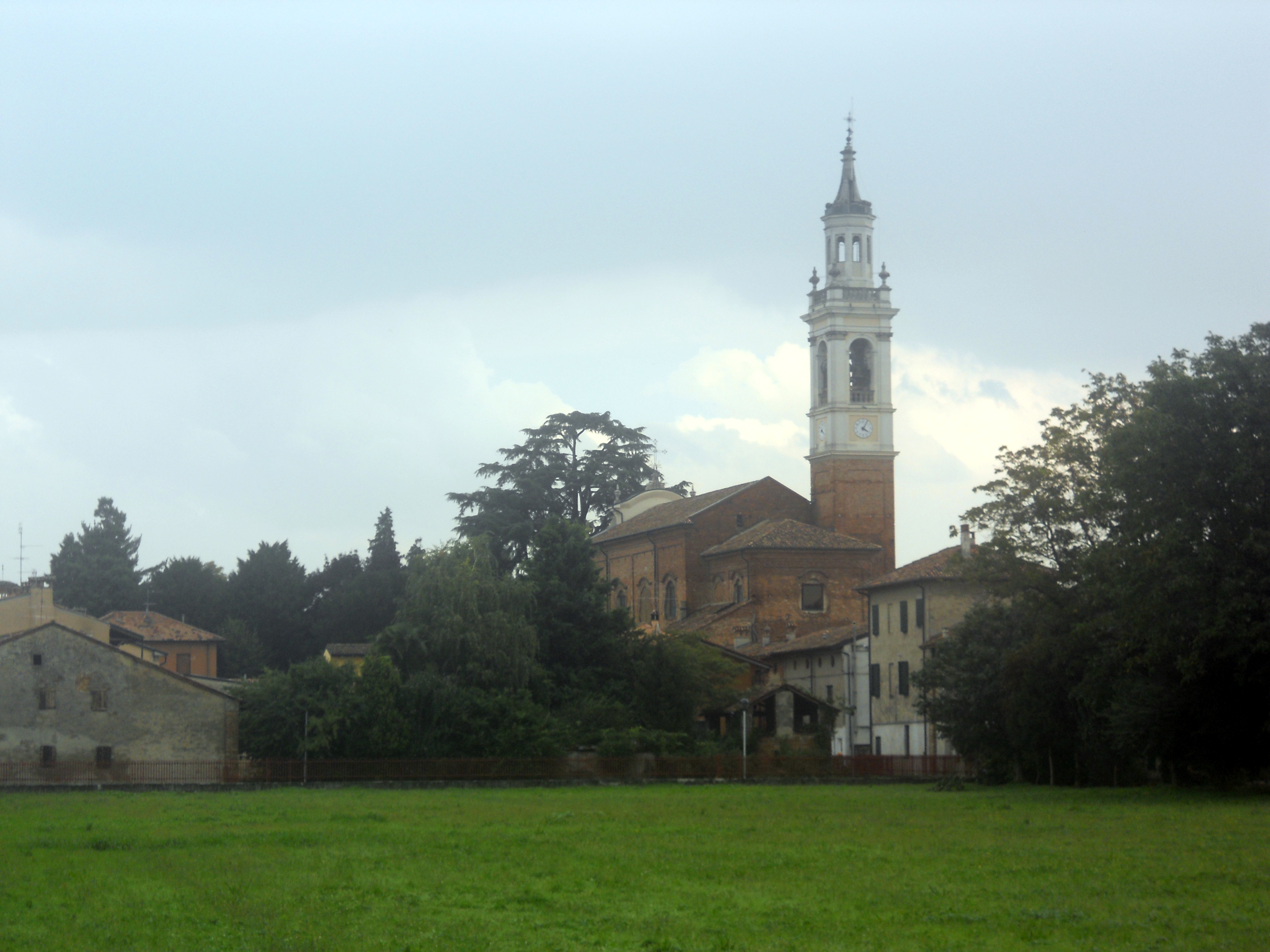

- Location within Italy Location within Lombardy
- Coordinates: 45°20′N 9°42′E
- Country: Italy
- Region: Lombardy
- Province: Cremona (CR)

Government
  - Mayor: Aries Bonazza

Area
  - Total: 11.78 km^{2} (4.55 sq mi)
- Elevation: 78 m (256 ft)

Population (30 December 2015)
  - Total: 3,426
  - Density: 290.8/km^{2} (753.3/sq mi)
- Demonym: Ripaltesi
- Time zone: UTC+1 (CET)
  - Summer (DST): UTC+2 (CEST)
- Postal code: 26010
- Dialing code: 0373
- Website: Official website

Ripalta Cremasca (Cremasco: Riultélina Grasa) is a comune (municipality) in the Province of Cremona in the Italian region Lombardy, located about 45 kilometres (28 mi) southeast of Milan and about 35 kilometres (22 mi) northwest of Cremona.

Ripalta Cremasca borders the following municipalities: Capergnanica, Credera Rubbiano, Crema, Madignano, Moscazzano, Ripalta Arpina, Ripalta Guerina.
