= Ripalta Guerina =

- Comune
- Comune di Ripalta Guerina
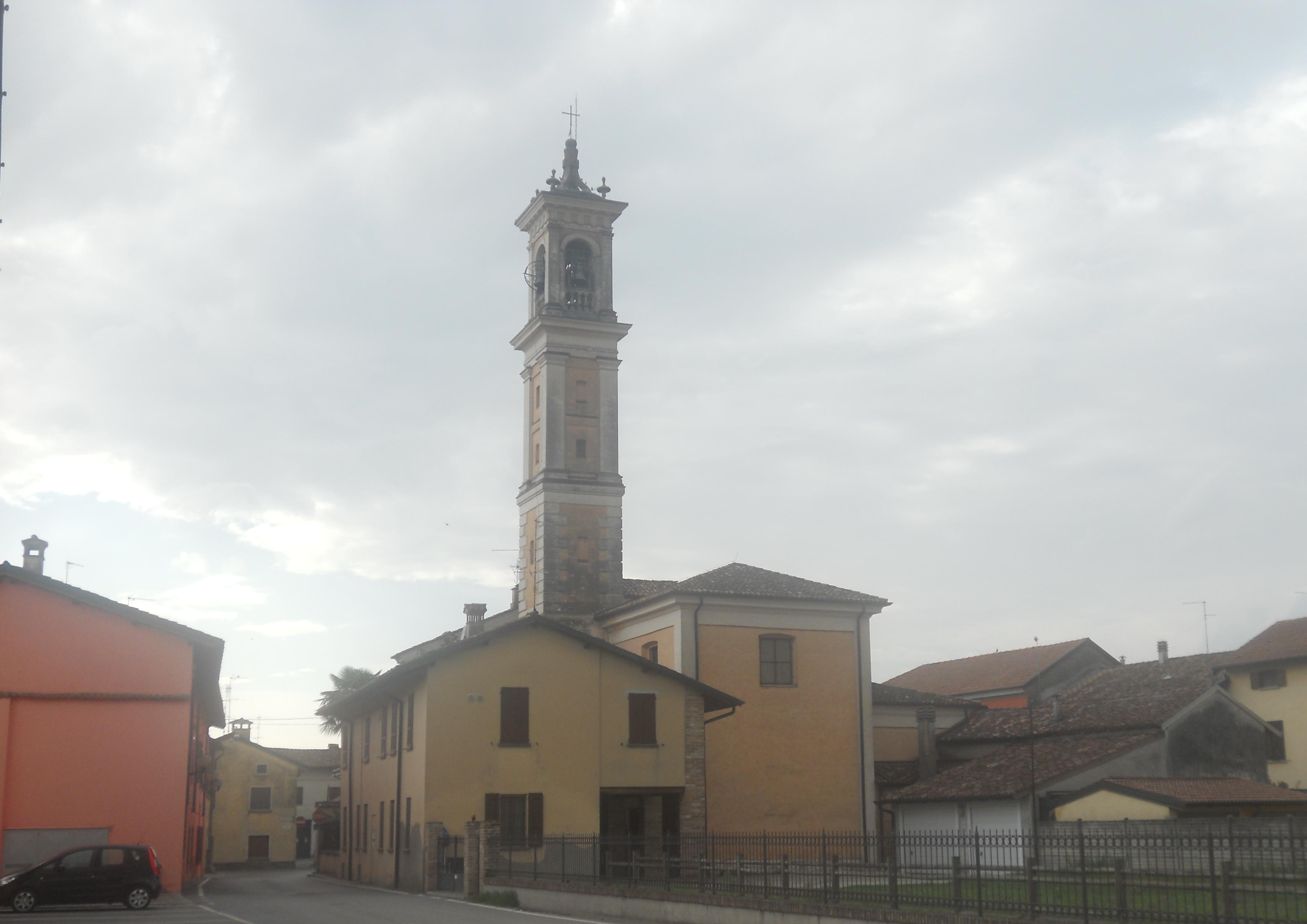

- Location within Italy Location within Lombardy
- Coordinates: 45°18′N 9°42′E
- Country: Italy
- Region: Lombardy
- Province: Cremona (CR)

Government
  - Mayor: Luca Giovanni Guerini

Area
  - Total: 2.97 km^{2} (1.15 sq mi)
- Elevation: 67 m (220 ft)

Population (31 December 2015)
  - Total: 531
  - Density: 179/km^{2} (463/sq mi)
- Demonym: Guerinesi or Ripaltesi
- Time zone: UTC+1 (CET)
  - Summer (DST): UTC+2 (CEST)
- Postal code: 26010
- Dialing code: 0373
- Website: Official website

Ripalta Guerina (Cremasco: Riultelina) is a comune (municipality) in the Province of Cremona in the Italian region Lombardy, located about 45 kilometres (28 mi) southeast of Milan and about 30 kilometres (19 mi) northwest of Cremona.

Ripalta Guerina borders the following municipalities: Montodine, Moscazzano, Ripalta Arpina, Ripalta Cremasca.
