= Ripalta Arpina =

- Comune
- Comune di Ripalta Arpina
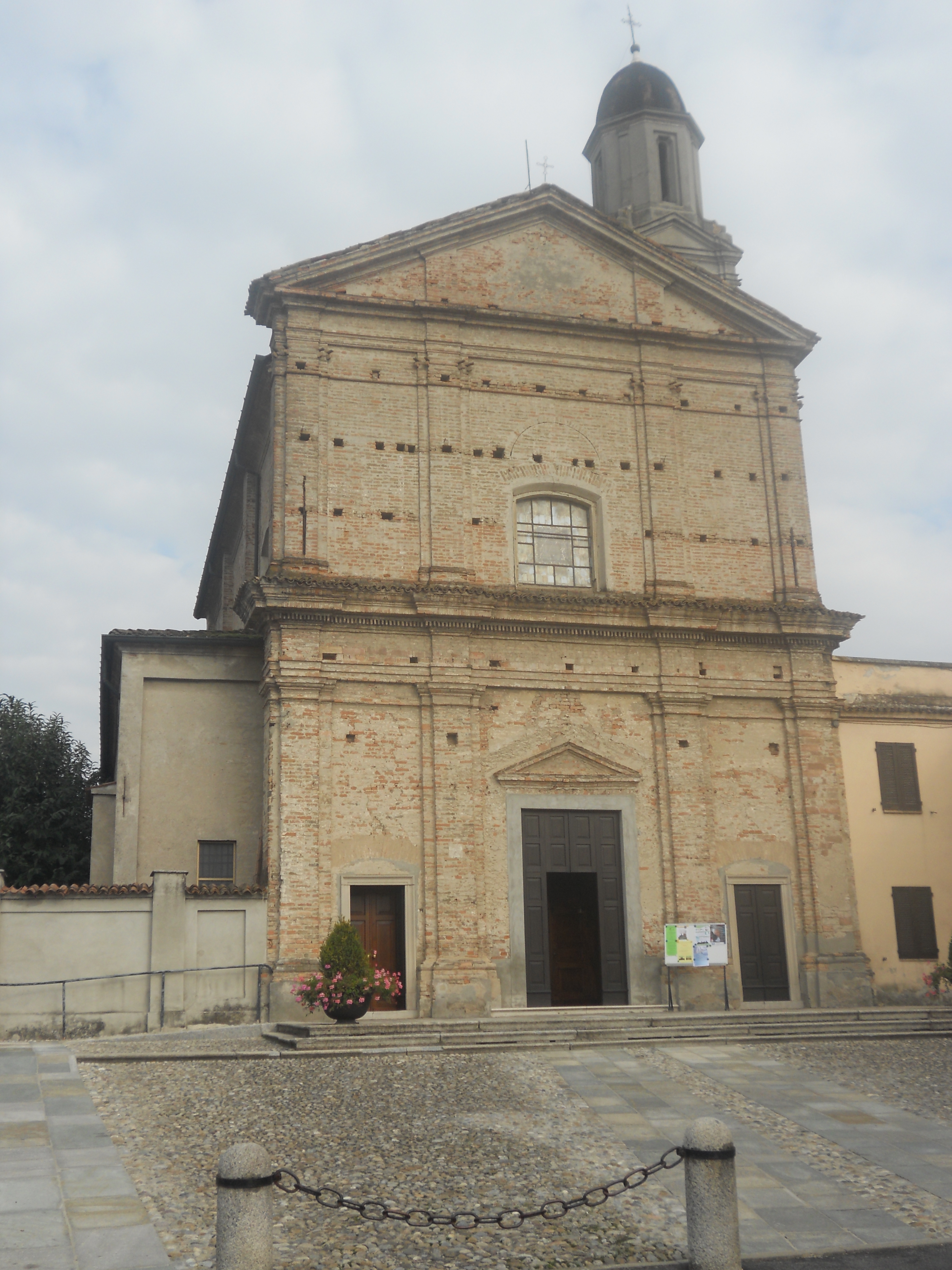

- Location within Italy Location within Lombardy
- Coordinates: 45°18′04″N 9°43′37″E
- Country: Italy
- Region: Lombardy
- Province: Cremona (CR)
- Frazioni: Bocca Serio, Cascina Cà Nova

Government
  - Mayor: Marco Ginelli (Municipal list)

Area
  - Total: 6.96 km^{2} (2.69 sq mi)
- Elevation: 72 m (236 ft)

Population (30 September 2016)Istat
  - Total: 997
  - Density: 143/km^{2} (371/sq mi)
- Demonym: Ripaltesi or Arpinesi
- Time zone: UTC+1 (CET)
  - Summer (DST): UTC+2 (CEST)
- Postal code: 26010
- Dialing code: 0373
- Website: Official website

Ripalta Arpina (Cremasco: Riultèla), 1038 inhabitants as of 31 December 2013, is a comune (municipality) in the Province of Cremona in the Italian region of Lombardy. It is located about 50 kilometres (31 mi) southeast of Milan and about 30 kilometres (19 mi) northwest of Cremona.

Ripalta Arpina borders the following municipalities: Bertonico, Castelleone, Gombito, Madignano, Montodine, Ripalta Cremasca, Ripalta Guerina.
