= Offanengo =

Offanengo Fanénch (Lombard)
- Comune
- Comune di Offanengo
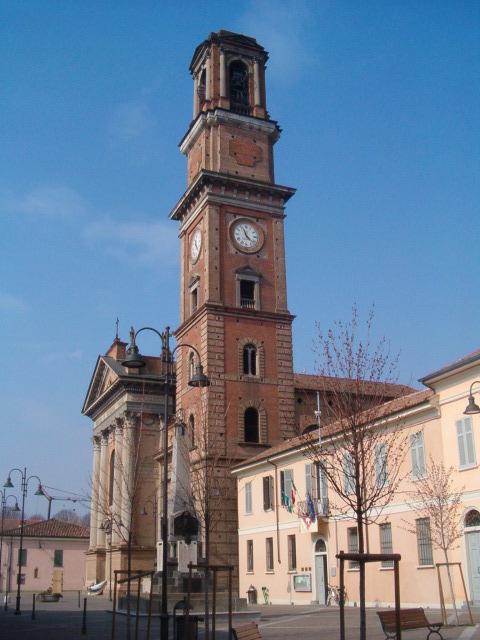
- Church of Santa Maria Purificata.

- Location within Italy Location within Lombardy
- Coordinates: 45°23′N 9°44′E
- Country: Italy
- Region: Lombardy
- Province: Cremona (CR)

Government
  - Mayor: Giovanni Rossoni

Area
  - Total: 12.58 km^{2} (4.86 sq mi)
- Elevation: 80 m (260 ft)

Population (30 November 2017)
  - Total: 6,023
  - Density: 478.8/km^{2} (1,240/sq mi)
- Demonym: Offanenghesi
- Time zone: UTC+1 (CET)
  - Summer (DST): UTC+2 (CEST)
- Postal code: 26010
- Dialing code: 0373
- Website: Official website

Offanengo (Cremasco: Fanénch) is a comune (municipality) in the Province of Cremona in the Italian region Lombardy, located about 45 kilometres (28 mi) east of Milan and about 35 kilometres (22 mi) northwest of Cremona.

Offanengo borders the following municipalities: Casaletto di Sopra, Crema, Izano, Ricengo, Romanengo.
