= Casalmorano =

Casalmorano Casalmuràn (Lombard)
- Comune
- Comune di Casalmorano
- Location within Italy Location within Lombardy
- Coordinates: 45°17′N 9°53′E
- Country: Italy
- Region: Lombardy
- Province: Cremona (CR)

Government
  - Mayor: Andrea Arcaini

Area
  - Total: 12.28 km^{2} (4.74 sq mi)
- Elevation: 67 m (220 ft)

Population (31 Mary 2017)
  - Total: 1,610
  - Density: 131/km^{2} (340/sq mi)
- Demonym: Casalmoranesi
- Time zone: UTC+1 (CET)
  - Summer (DST): UTC+2 (CEST)
- Postal code: 26020
- Dialing code: 0374
- Website: Official website

Casalmorano (Soresinese: Casalmuràn) is a comune (municipality) in the Province of Cremona in the Italian region Lombardy, located about 60 kilometres (37 mi) southeast of Milan and about 20 kilometres (12 mi) northwest of Cremona.

Casalmorano borders the following municipalities: Annicco, Azzanello, Casalbuttano ed Uniti, Castelvisconti, Genivolta, Paderno Ponchielli, Soresina.
