= Casaletto di Sopra =

Casaletto di Sopra Casalèt da Sura (Lombard)
- Comune
- Comune di Casaletto di Sopra
- Location within Italy Location within Lombardy
- Coordinates: 45°25′N 9°47′E
- Country: Italy
- Region: Lombardy
- Province: Cremona (CR)

Government
  - Mayor: Roberto Moreni (since 2019)

Area
  - Total: 8.66 km^{2} (3.34 sq mi)
- Elevation: 87 m (285 ft)

Population (31 December 2021)
  - Total: 514
  - Density: 59.4/km^{2} (154/sq mi)
- Demonym: Casalettesi
- Time zone: UTC+1 (CET)
  - Summer (DST): UTC+2 (CEST)
- Postal code: 26014
- Dialing code: 0373
- Patron saint: S. Patrick
- Saint day: third Sunday of October
- Website: Official website

Casaletto di Sopra (Cremasco: Casalèt da Sura) is a comune (municipality) in the Province of Cremona in the Italian region Lombardy, located about 50 kilometres (31 mi) east of Milan and about 35 kilometres (22 mi) northwest of Cremona.

Casaletto di Sopra borders the following municipalities: Barbata, Camisano, Fontanella, Offanengo, Ricengo, Romanengo, Soncino, Ticengo.
