= Montodine =

Montodine Muntóden (Lombard)
- Comune
- Comune di Montodine
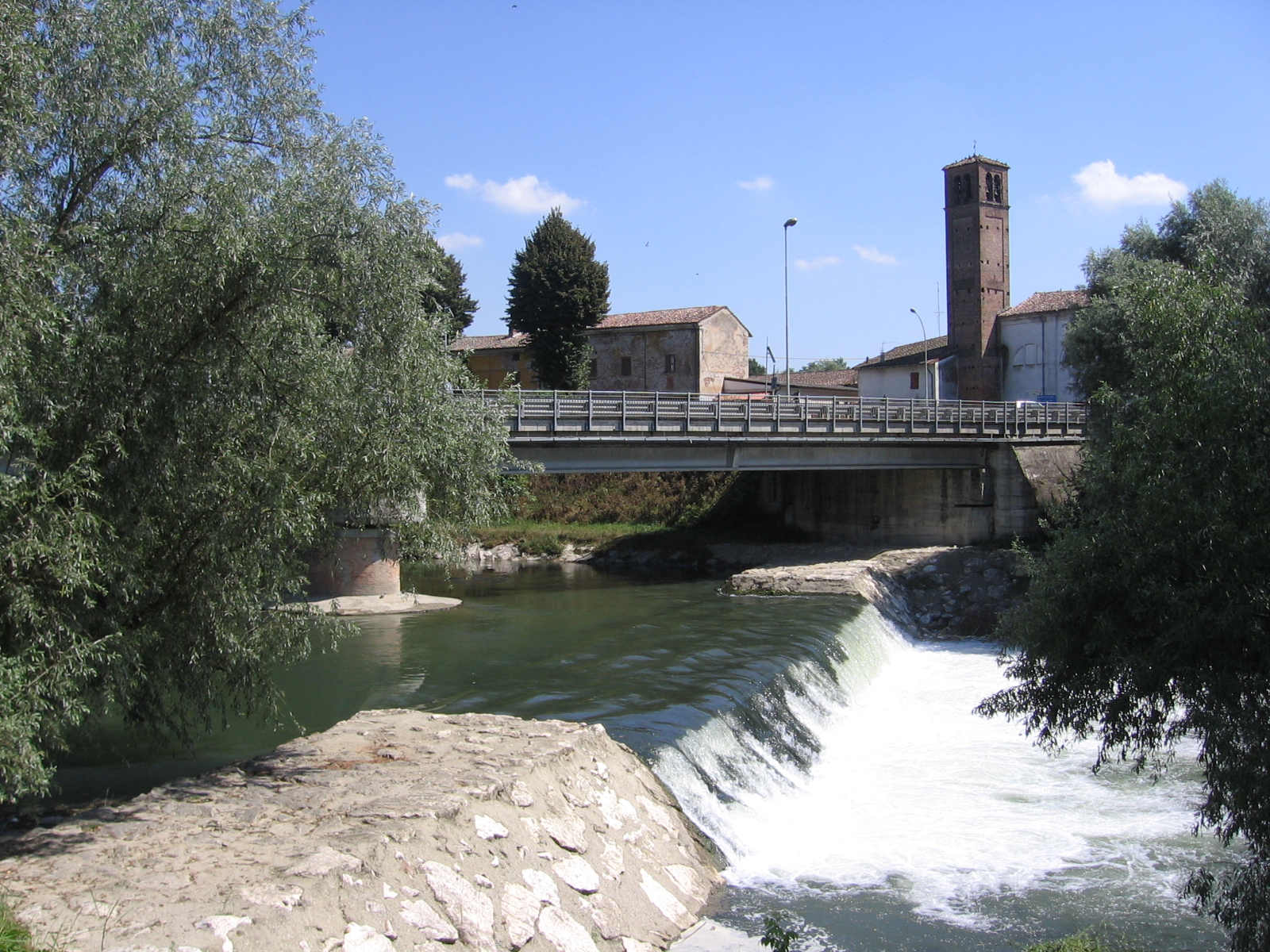
- The river Serio at Montodine.

- Location within Italy Location within Lombardy
- Coordinates: 45°17′N 9°43′E
- Country: Italy
- Region: Lombardy
- Province: Cremona (CR)

Government
  - Mayor: Alessandro Pandini

Area
  - Total: 11.39 km^{2} (4.40 sq mi)
- Elevation: 61 m (200 ft)

Population (30 November 2017)
  - Total: 2,512
  - Density: 220.5/km^{2} (571.2/sq mi)
- Demonym: Montodinesi
- Time zone: UTC+1 (CET)
  - Summer (DST): UTC+2 (CEST)
- Postal code: 26010
- Dialing code: 0373
- Website: Official website

Montodine (Cremasco: Muntóden) is a comune (municipality) in the Province of Cremona in the Italian region Lombardy, located about 50 kilometres (31 mi) southeast of Milan and about 30 kilometres (19 mi) northwest of Cremona.

Montodine borders the following municipalities: Bertonico, Moscazzano, Ripalta Arpina, Ripalta Guerina.
