= Izano =

Izano Isàa (Lombard)
- Comune
- Comune di Izano
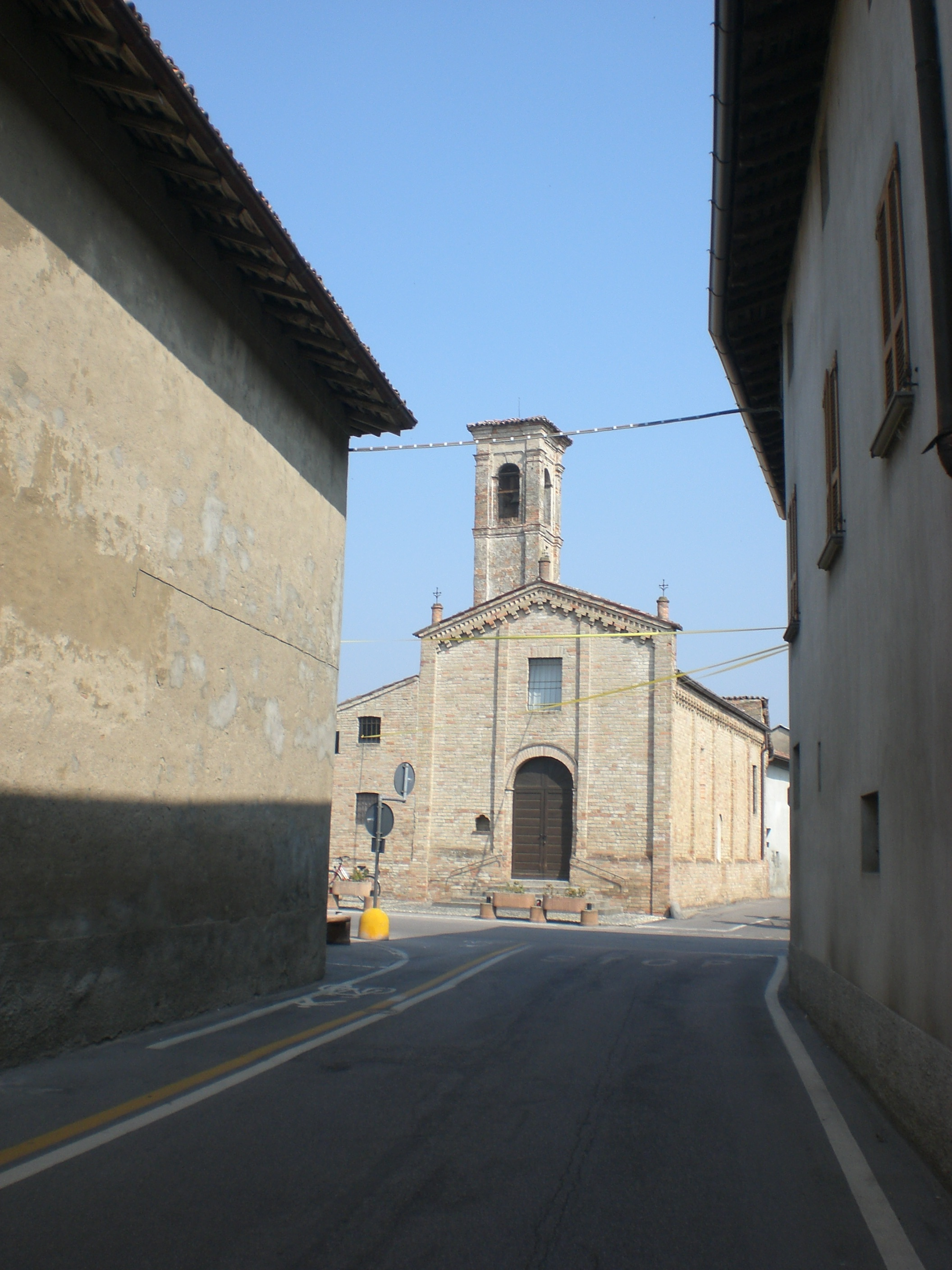
- Church of San Rocco.

- Coat of arms

- Location within Italy Location within Lombardy
- Coordinates: 45°21′N 9°45′E
- Country: Italy
- Region: Lombardy
- Province: Cremona (CR)

Government
  - Mayor: Luigi Tolasi

Area
  - Total: 6.19 km^{2} (2.39 sq mi)
- Elevation: 74 m (243 ft)

Population (31 August 2017)
  - Total: 1,985
  - Density: 321/km^{2} (831/sq mi)
- Demonym: Izanesi
- Time zone: UTC+1 (CET)
  - Summer (DST): UTC+2 (CEST)
- Postal code: 26010
- Dialing code: 0373
- Website: Official website

Izano (Cremasco: Isàa) is a comune (municipality) in the Province of Cremona in the Italian region of Lombardy, located about 45 kilometres (28 mi) southeast of Milan and about 35 kilometres (22 mi) northwest of Cremona.

Izano borders the following municipalities: Castelleone, Crema, Fiesco, Madignano, Offanengo, Romanengo, Salvirola.

== History ==
The history of Izano has been always connected to that of the nearby, and more powerful, Crema. The first documents mentioning Izano (as Giosano) date from the late 10th century. Later it was probably under the suzerainty of the bishopric of Cremona. Later Izano was a possession of Crema until, in the late 15th century, it was conquered by the Republic of Venice.

== Main sights ==
- The Sanctuary of the Pallavicina, on the road towards Crema. It dates at least from the 15th century. It has a single with an apse frescoed by artists from Cremona
- The church of San Biagio, rebuilt in 1900.
- The Oratory of St. Roch (14th-15th century), recently restored.

The countryside of Izano also has several patrician villas built by Venetian noblemen, mainly in the 17th century. They include the Villa Severgnini.
