= Castelleone =

Castelleone Castigliòn (Lombard)
- Comune
- Comune di Castelleone
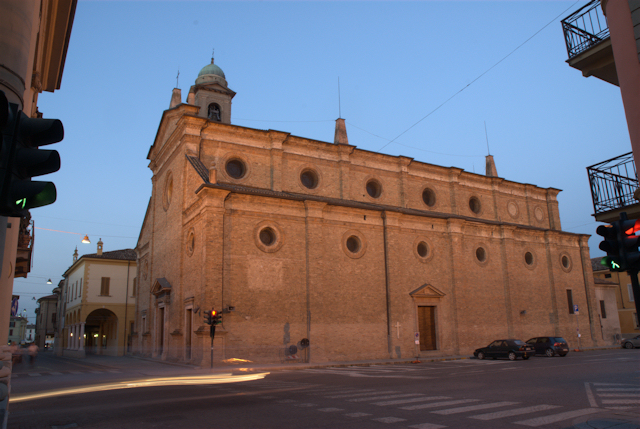
- Parish church of Saints Philip and James.

- Location within Italy Location within Lombardy
- Coordinates: 45°18′N 9°46′E
- Country: Italy
- Region: Lombardy
- Province: Cremona (CR)
- Frazioni: Cortellona, Corte Madama, Guzzafame, Le Valli, Pellegra, Pradazzo, San Latino, Valseresino

Government
  - Mayor: Pietro Enrico Fiori

Area
  - Total: 45.08 km^{2} (17.41 sq mi)
- Elevation: 66 m (217 ft)

Population (31 December 2017)
  - Total: 9,472
  - Density: 210.1/km^{2} (544.2/sq mi)
- Demonym: Castelleonesi
- Time zone: UTC+1 (CET)
  - Summer (DST): UTC+2 (CEST)
- Postal code: 26012
- Dialing code: 0374
- Patron saint: Saints Philip and James
- Saint day: 11 May
- Website: Official website

Castelleone (Italian pronunciation: [kaˌstɛlleˈoːne]; locally Castigliòn) is a comune (municipality) in the Province of Cremona in the Italian region of Lombardy, located about 60 kilometres (37 mi) southeast of Milan and about 30 kilometres (19 mi) northwest of Cremona.

Castelleone borders the following municipalities: Cappella Cantone, Fiesco, Gombito, Izano, Madignano, Ripalta Arpina, San Bassano, Soresina, Trigolo.

== Main sights ==
- Sanctuary of Santa Maria della Misericordia, built in 1513-1516 by Agostino de Fondulis in Renaissance style.
- Church of Santa Maria in Bressanoro, commissioned in the 15th century by Bianca Maria Visconti. It has Renaissance frescoes of the Life of Jesus
- Parish church of St. Philip and James (1551), with a Renaissance-style exterior and a Baroque exterior.
- Isso Tower (11th century)

== Transportation ==
Castelleone is served by the Castelleone railway station on the Treviglio–Cremona line.
