= Cumignano sul Naviglio =

- Comune
- Comune di Cumignano sul Naviglio
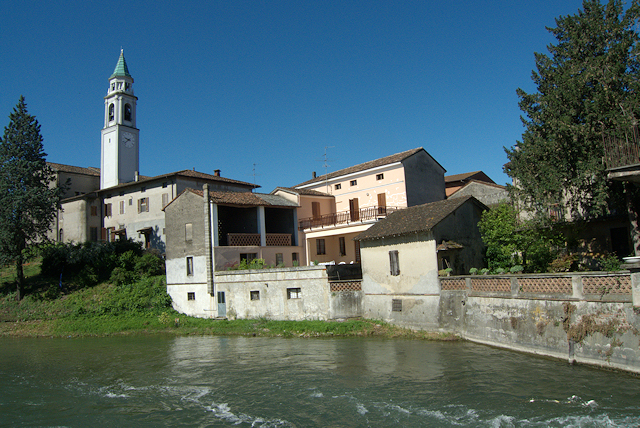

- Location within Italy Location within Lombardy
- Coordinates: 45°21′N 9°50′E
- Country: Italy
- Region: Lombardy
- Province: Cremona (CR)

Government
  - Mayor: Aldo Alessandri

Area
  - Total: 6.6 km^{2} (2.5 sq mi)
- Elevation: 73 m (240 ft)

Population (28 February 2017)
  - Total: 451
  - Density: 68/km^{2} (180/sq mi)
- Demonym: Cumignanesi
- Time zone: UTC+1 (CET)
  - Summer (DST): UTC+2 (CEST)
- Postal code: 26020
- Dialing code: 0374
- Patron saint: St. George Martyr
- Saint day: 23 April
- Website: Official website

Cumignano sul Naviglio (Soresinese: Cümignà) is a comune (municipality) in the Province of Cremona in the Italian region Lombardy, located about 50 kilometres (31 mi) east of Milan and about 30 kilometres (19 mi) northwest of Cremona.

Cumignano sul Naviglio borders the following municipalities: Genivolta, Salvirola, Soncino, Soresina, Ticengo, Trigolo.
