= Ticengo =

Ticengo Tisènch (Lombard)
- Comune
- Comune di Ticengo
- Parish church.

- Location within Italy Location within Lombardy
- Coordinates: 45°22′N 9°50′E
- Country: Italy
- Region: Lombardy
- Province: Cremona (CR)

Government
  - Mayor: Marco Arcari

Area
  - Total: 7.98 km^{2} (3.08 sq mi)
- Elevation: 76 m (249 ft)

Population (30 September 2016)
  - Total: 443
  - Density: 55.5/km^{2} (144/sq mi)
- Demonym: Ticenghesi
- Time zone: UTC+1 (CET)
  - Summer (DST): UTC+2 (CEST)
- Postal code: 26010
- Dialing code: 0374
- Website: Official website

Ticengo (Soresinese: Tisènch) is a comune (municipality) in the Province of Cremona in the Italian region Lombardy, located about 50 kilometres (31 mi) east of Milan and about 30 kilometres (19 mi) northwest of Cremona.

Ticengo borders the following municipalities: Casaletto di Sopra, Cumignano sul Naviglio, Romanengo, Salvirola, Soncino.
