= Moscazzano =

Moscazzano Muscasà (Lombard)
- Comune
- Comune di Moscazzano
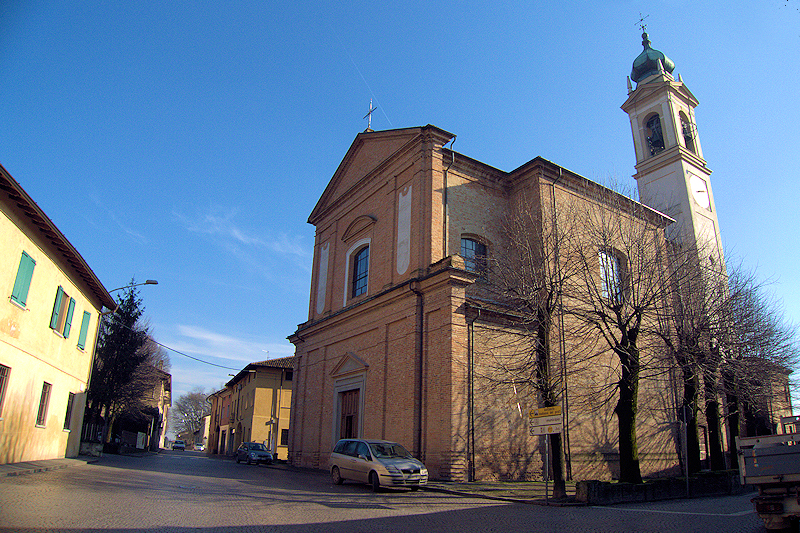

- Location within Italy Location within Lombardy
- Coordinates: 45°17′N 9°41′E
- Country: Italy
- Region: Lombardy
- Province: Cremona (CR)

Government
  - Mayor: Gianluca Savoldi

Area
  - Total: 8.15 km^{2} (3.15 sq mi)
- Elevation: 67 m (220 ft)

Population (30 November 2017)
  - Total: 784
  - Density: 96.2/km^{2} (249/sq mi)
- Demonym: Moscazzanesi
- Time zone: UTC+1 (CET)
  - Summer (DST): UTC+2 (CEST)
- Postal code: 26010
- Dialing code: 0373
- Website: Official website

Moscazzano (Cremasco: Muscasà) is a comune (municipality) in the Province of Cremona in the Italian region Lombardy, located about 45 kilometres (28 mi) southeast of Milan and about 30 kilometres (19 mi) northwest of Cremona.

Moscazzano borders the following municipalities: Bertonico, Credera Rubbiano, Montodine, Ripalta Cremasca, Ripalta Guerina, Turano Lodigiano.

== Main sights ==
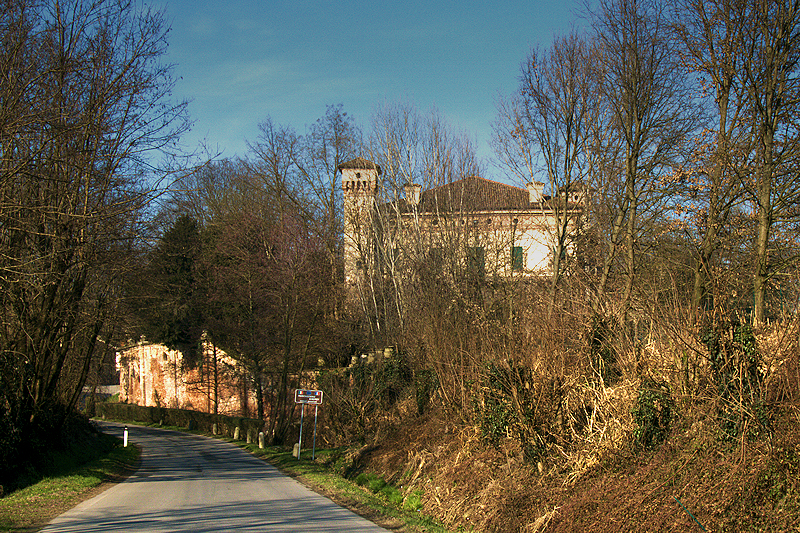
Villa Albergoni seen from the main road (2011)

- The parish church of St. Peter was built between 1797 and 1801 in a style that already turns to the neoclassical; numerous paintings by Mauro Picenardi and fresco by Angelo Bacchetta
- The oratory of St. Charles Borromeo, built in the late 50s and later equipped with a sacristy.
- The oratory of San Donato, near a group of farmhouses, already existing in the 16th century but rebuilt in 1708
- Sanctuary of the Madonna dei Prati, a place of worship of uncertain history, dating probably before 1483
- Villa Albergoni, a 17th-century mansion. It was the main set in the 2017 film Call Me by Your Name
- Villa Groppelli, late neoclassical style villa on the edge of an English park
- Villa Marazzi, country house probably already existing in 1650, but the current appearance derives from a renovation carried out in the 18th century

== People ==
- Camilla Marazzi
