= San Bassano =

San Bassano San Basàn (Lombard)
- Comune
- Comune di San Bassano
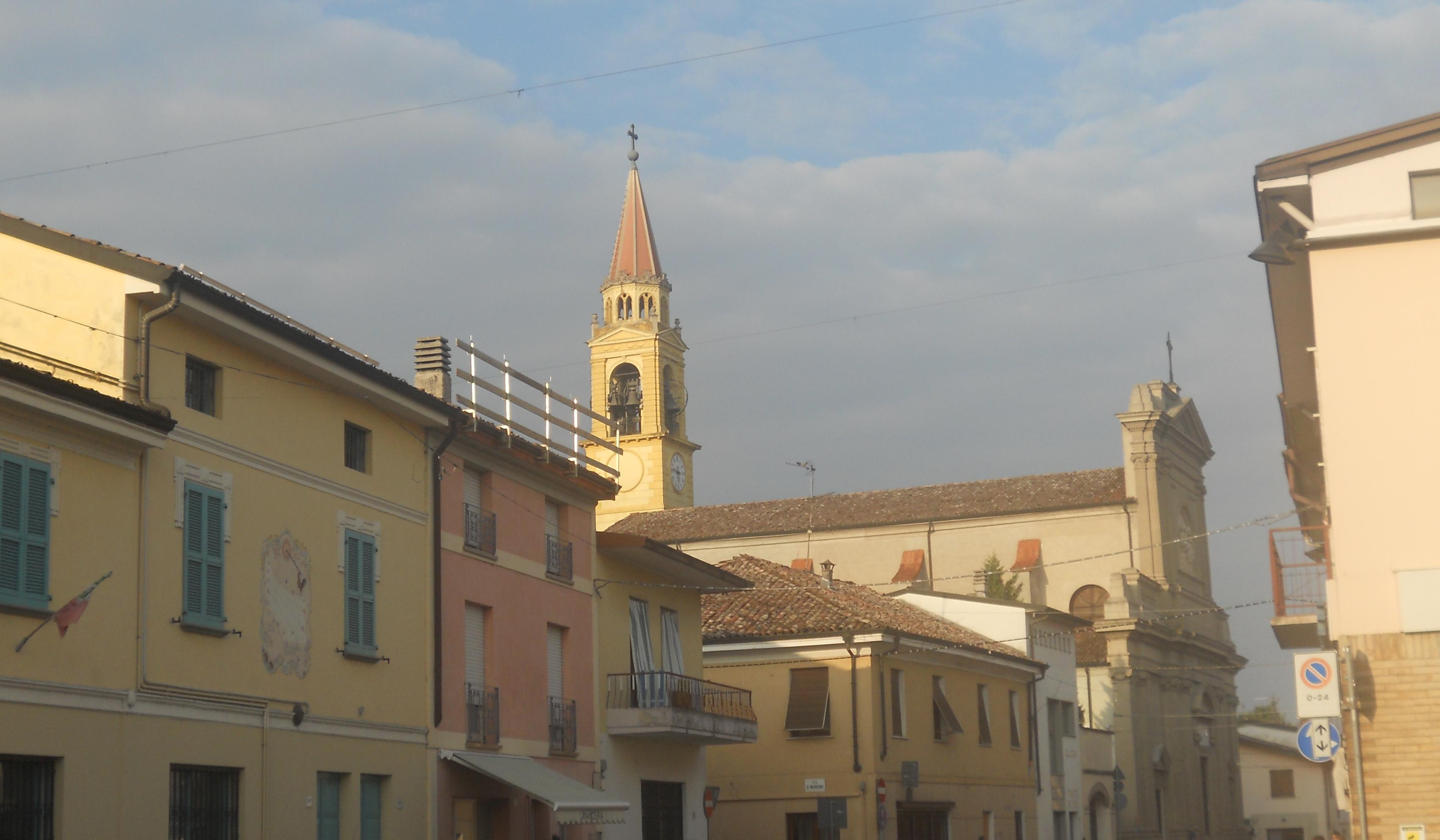

- Location within Italy Location within Lombardy
- Coordinates: 45°15′N 9°48′E
- Country: Italy
- Region: Lombardy
- Province: Cremona (CR)

Government
  - Mayor: Giuseppe Papa

Area
  - Total: 13.93 km^{2} (5.38 sq mi)
- Elevation: 59 m (194 ft)

Population (30 September 2016)
  - Total: 2,170
  - Density: 156/km^{2} (403/sq mi)
- Demonym: Sanbassanesi
- Time zone: UTC+1 (CET)
  - Summer (DST): UTC+2 (CEST)
- Postal code: 26020
- Dialing code: 0374
- Website: Official website

San Bassano (locally San Basàn) is a comune (municipality) in the Province of Cremona in the Italian region Lombardy, located about 60 kilometres (37 mi) southeast of Milan and about 20 kilometres (12 mi) northwest of Cremona.

San Bassano borders the following municipalities: Cappella Cantone, Castelleone, Formigara, Gombito, Pizzighettone.
