= Romanengo =

Romanengo Rumanènch (Lombard)
- Comune
- Comune di Romanengo
- Location within Italy Location within Lombardy
- Coordinates: 45°23′N 9°47′E
- Country: Italy
- Region: Lombardy
- Province: Cremona (CR)

Government
  - Mayor: Attilio Polla

Area
  - Total: 15.05 km^{2} (5.81 sq mi)
- Elevation: 81 m (266 ft)

Population (28 February 2017)
  - Total: 3,070
  - Density: 204/km^{2} (528/sq mi)
- Demonym: Romanenghesi
- Time zone: UTC+1 (CET)
  - Summer (DST): UTC+2 (CEST)
- Postal code: 26014
- Dialing code: 0373
- Website: Official website

Romanengo (Cremasco: Rumanènch) is a comune (municipality) in the Province of Cremona in the Italian region Lombardy, located about 50 kilometres (31 mi) east of Milan and about 35 kilometres (22 mi) northwest of Cremona.

Romanengo borders the following municipalities: Casaletto di Sopra, Izano, Offanengo, Salvirola, Ticengo.
