= Trigolo =

Trigolo Trìgol (Lombard)
- Comune
- Comune di Trigolo
- Location within Italy Location within Lombardy
- Coordinates: 45°20′N 9°49′E
- Country: Italy
- Region: Lombardy
- Province: Cremona (CR)

Government
  - Mayor: Christian Sacchetti

Area
  - Total: 16.06 km^{2} (6.20 sq mi)
- Elevation: 70 m (230 ft)

Population (30 September 2016)
  - Total: 1,730
  - Density: 108/km^{2} (279/sq mi)
- Demonym: Trigolesi
- Time zone: UTC+1 (CET)
  - Summer (DST): UTC+2 (CEST)
- Postal code: 26018
- Dialing code: 0374
- Patron saint: St. Benedict
- Saint day: 11 July
- Website: Official website

Trigolo (locally Trìgol) is a comune (municipality) in the Province of Cremona in the Italian region Lombardy, located about 50 kilometres (31 mi) southeast of Milan and about 30 kilometres (19 mi) northwest of Cremona.

Trigolo borders the following municipalities: Castelleone, Cumignano sul Naviglio, Fiesco, Salvirola, Soresina.
