= Fiesco, Lombardy =

Fiesco Fièsc (Lombard)
- Comune
- Comune di Fiesco
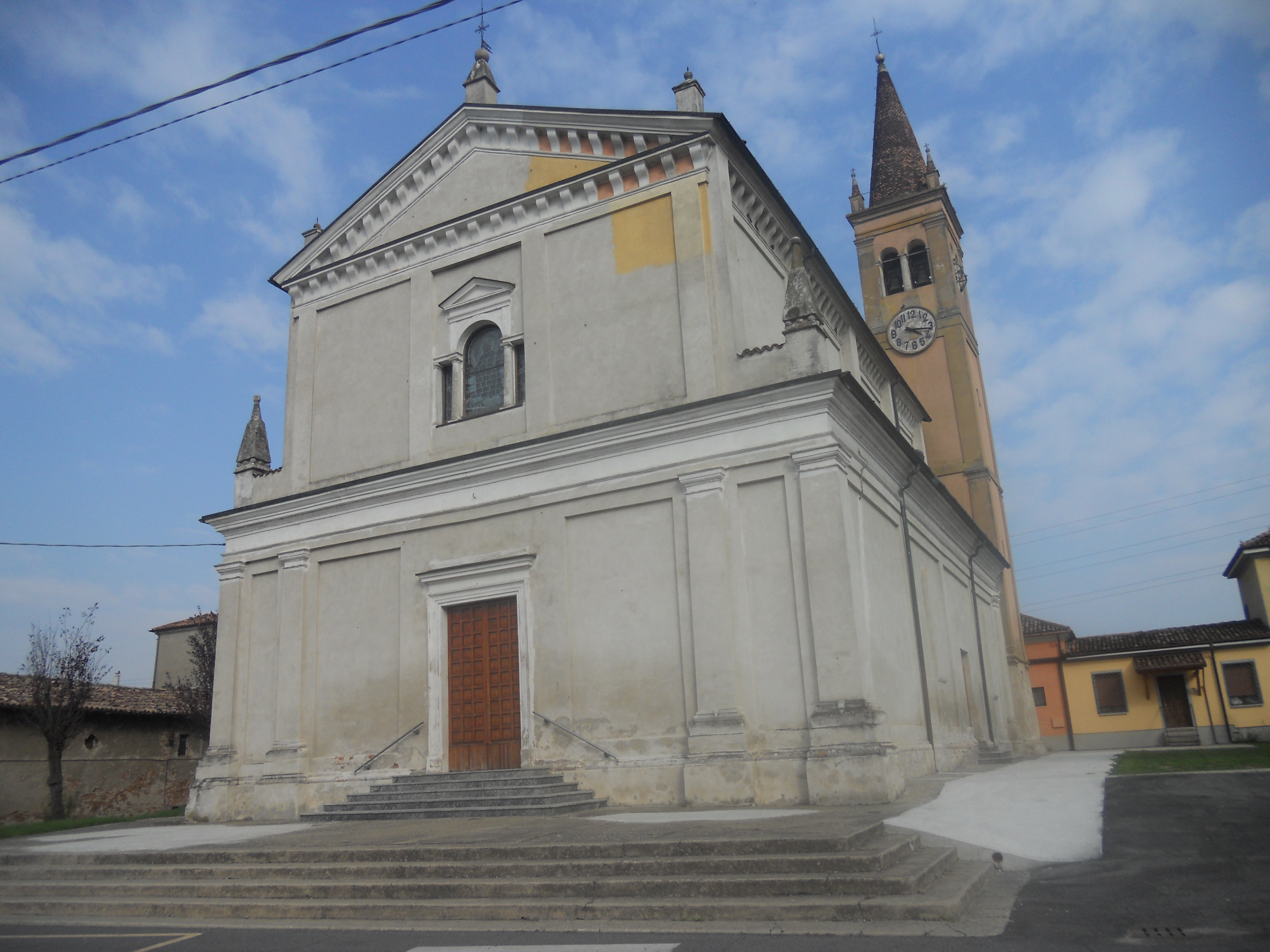

- Location within Italy Location within Lombardy
- Coordinates: 45°20′N 9°47′E
- Country: Italy
- Region: Lombardy
- Province: Cremona (CR)

Government
  - Mayor: Giuseppe Piacentini

Area
  - Total: 8.19 km^{2} (3.16 sq mi)
- Elevation: 69 m (226 ft)

Population (31 July 2017)
  - Total: 1,178
  - Density: 144/km^{2} (373/sq mi)
- Demonym: Fieschesi
- Time zone: UTC+1 (CET)
  - Summer (DST): UTC+2 (CEST)
- Postal code: 26010
- Dialing code: 0374
- Website: Official website

Fiesco (Cremunés: Fièsc) is a comune (municipality) in the Province of Cremona in the Italian region Lombardy, located about 50 kilometres (31 mi) southeast of Milan and about 30 kilometres (19 mi) northwest of Cremona.

Fiesco borders the following municipalities: Castelleone, Izano, Salvirola, Trigolo.
