= Villachiara =

Villachiara Elaciàra (Lombard)
- Comune
- Comune di Villachiara
- Location within Italy Location within Lombardy
- Coordinates: 45°21′N 9°56′E
- Country: Italy
- Region: Lombardy
- Province: Brescia (BS)
- Frazioni: Bompensiero, Villabuona, Villagana

Area
  - Total: 16.78 km^{2} (6.48 sq mi)
- Elevation: 75 m (246 ft)

Population (2011)
  - Total: 1,444
  - Density: 86.05/km^{2} (222.9/sq mi)
- Demonym: Villaclarensi
- Time zone: UTC+1 (CET)
  - Summer (DST): UTC+2 (CEST)
- Postal code: 25030
- Dialing code: 030
- ISTAT code: 017200
- Patron saint: Saint Chiara
- Saint day: 11 August
- Website: Official website

Villachiara (Brescian: Elaciàra) is a comune in the province of Brescia, in Lombardy. Its coat of arms shows an eagle in the top half and a silver castle on red in the bottom half.
