= Quinzano d'Oglio =

- Comune
- Comune di Quinzano d'Oglio
- Coat of arms

- Location within Italy Location within Lombardy
- Coordinates: 45°19′N 9°59′E
- Country: Italy
- Region: Lombardy
- Province: Brescia (BS)

Government
  - Mayor: Andrea Soregaroli

Area
  - Total: 21 km^{2} (8.1 sq mi)
- Elevation: 65 m (213 ft)

Population (28 February 2017)
  - Total: 6,252
  - Density: 300/km^{2} (770/sq mi)
- Demonym: Quinzanesi
- Time zone: UTC+1 (CET)
  - Summer (DST): UTC+2 (CEST)
- Postal code: 25027
- Dialing code: 030
- Patron saint: Saints Faustino and Giovita
- Saint day: 15 February
- Website: Official website

Quinzano d'Oglio (Brescian: Quinsà) is a comune in the province of Brescia, in Lombardy, northern Italy. The river Oglio runs across its territory, separating Quinzano from the province of Cremona.
