= Castiglione d'Adda =

- Comune
- Comune di Castiglione d'Adda
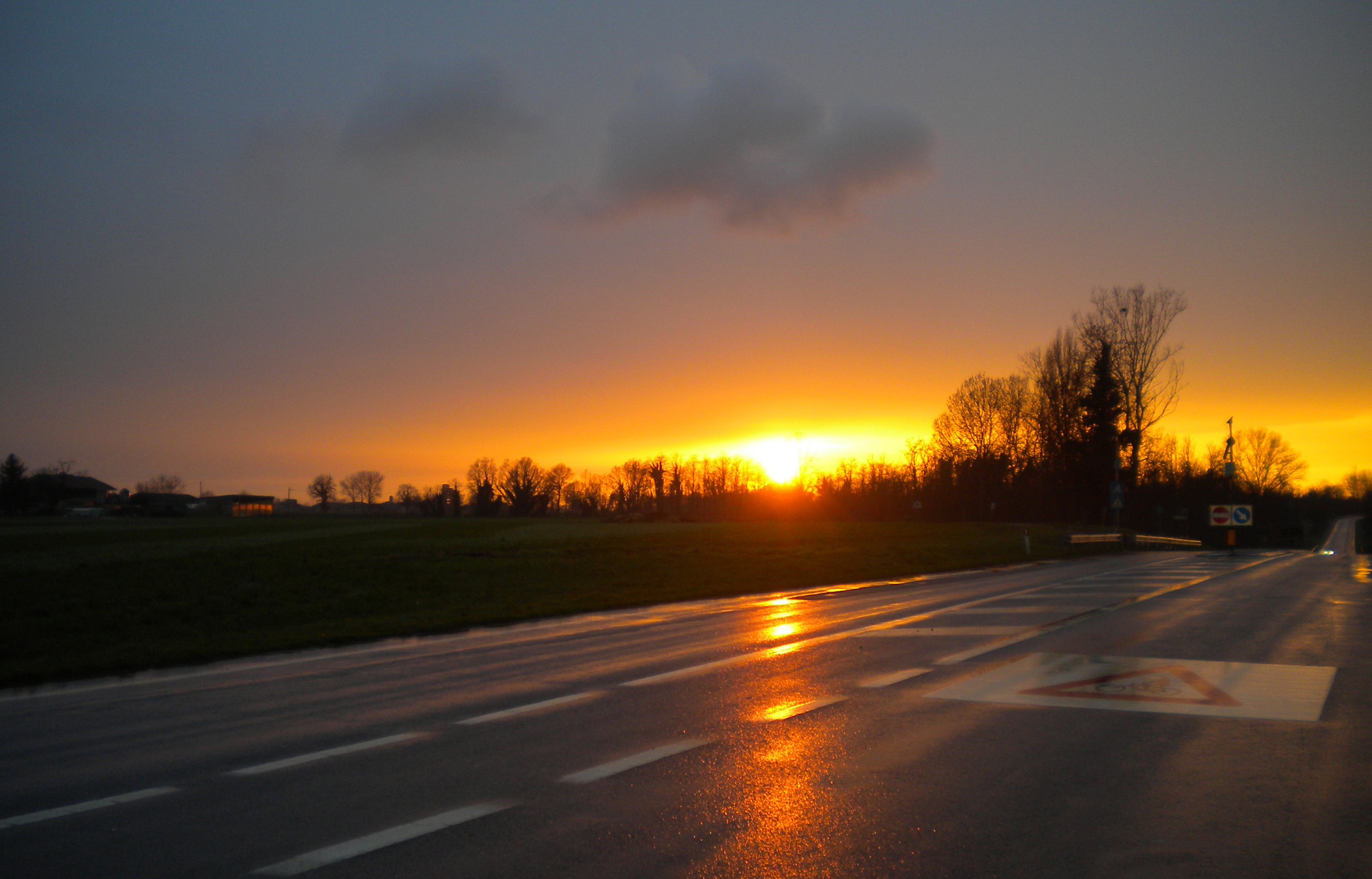
- Sunset in Castiglione d'Adda

- Coat of arms

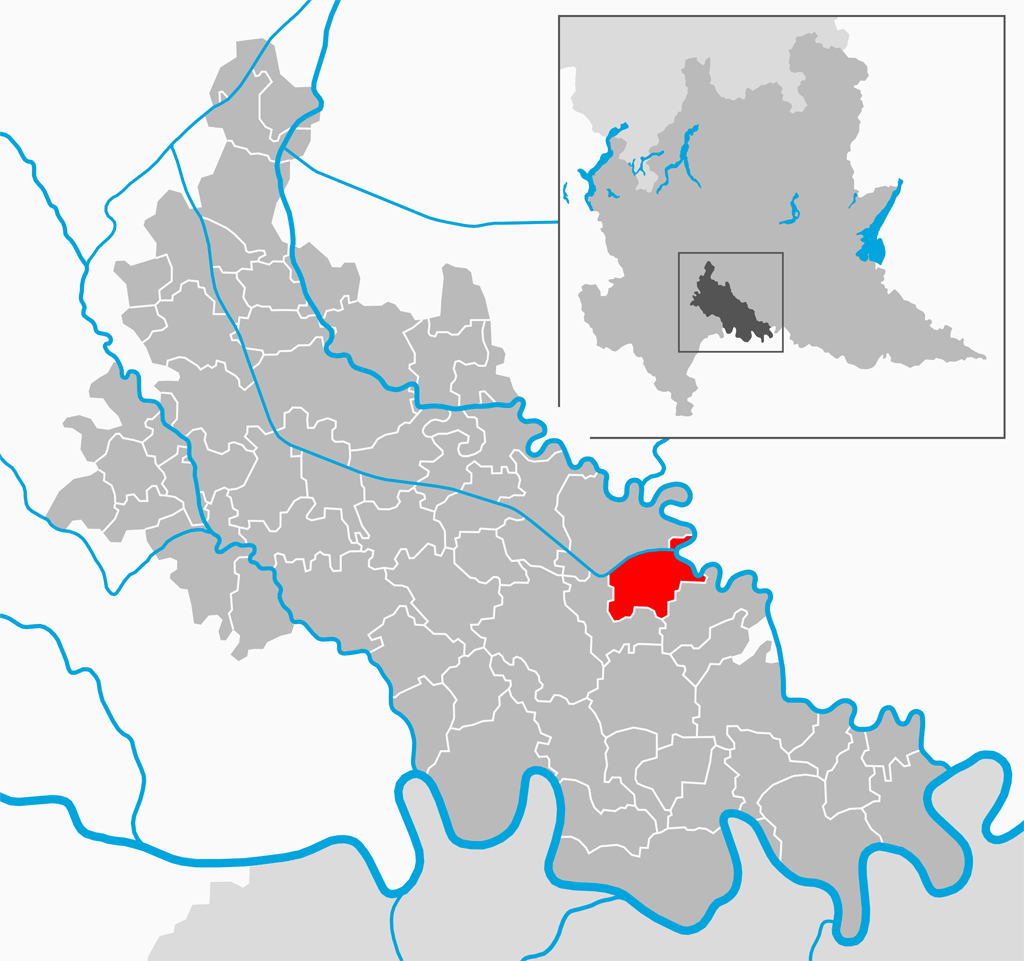

- Location within Italy Location within Lombardy
- Coordinates: 45°13′N 09°41′E
- Country: Italy
- Region: Lombardy
- Province: Lodi (LO)
- Frazioni: Cassinette

Government
  - Mayor: Costantino Pesatori

Area
  - Total: 12.98 km^{2} (5.01 sq mi)
- Elevation: 60 m (200 ft)

Population (30 June 2017)
  - Total: 4,659
  - Density: 358.9/km^{2} (929.6/sq mi)
- Demonym: Castiglionesi
- Time zone: UTC+1 (CET)
  - Summer (DST): UTC+2 (CEST)
- Postal code: 26283
- Dialing code: 0377
- Patron saint: St. Mary
- Saint day: August 15
- Website: Official website

Castiglione d'Adda (Lodigiano: Castiòn) is a town and comune in the province of Lodi, in Lombardy, northern Italy.

Sights include the medieval castle (later Palazzo Pallavicino Serbelloni), with a 16th-century façade, and the 16th century parish church.
