= Corte de' Cortesi con Cignone =

Corte de' Cortesi con Cignone Curt dé Curtées cont Signòon (Lombard)
- Comune
- Comune di Corte de' Cortesi con Cignone
- Location within Italy Location within Lombardy
- Coordinates: 45°16′N 10°00′E
- Country: Italy
- Region: Lombardy
- Province: Cremona (CR)

Government
  - Mayor: Luigi Rottoli

Area
  - Total: 12.85 km^{2} (4.96 sq mi)
- Elevation: 60 m (200 ft)

Population (28 February 2017)
  - Total: 1,093
  - Density: 85.06/km^{2} (220.3/sq mi)
- Demonym: Cortesini
- Time zone: UTC+1 (CET)
  - Summer (DST): UTC+2 (CEST)
- Postal code: 26020
- Dialing code: 0372
- Website: Official website

Corte de' Cortesi con Cignone (Cremunés: Curt dé Cortées cont Signòon) is a comune in the province of Cremona, in Lombardy, northern Italy.

The town has a parish church, San Giacomo e Filippo.
