= Treviglio–Cremona railway =

Railway line in Italy

Overview
- Native name: Ferrovia Cremona-Treviglio
- Status: in use
- Owner: RFI
- Locale: Lombardy, Italy
- Termini: Treviglio railway station; Cremona railway station
- Stations: 11

Service
- Type: heavy rail
- Services: R6
- Operator(s): Trenord

History
- Opened: 1863

Technical
- Line length: 65 km (40 mi)
- Number of tracks: 1
- Track gauge: 1,435 mm (4 ft 8 1/2 in) standard gauge
- Electrification: 3 kV DC overhead line

The Treviglio–Cremona railway is a railway line in Lombardy, Italy.

== History ==
The line was planned in the last years of the Austrian domination of Lombardy, and opened in 1863 after the Second Italian War of Independence.

It was electrified in 1977.

== See also ==
- List of railway lines in Italy
