= Cremasque Territory =

Geographical area in Lombardy, Italy

- Geographical area
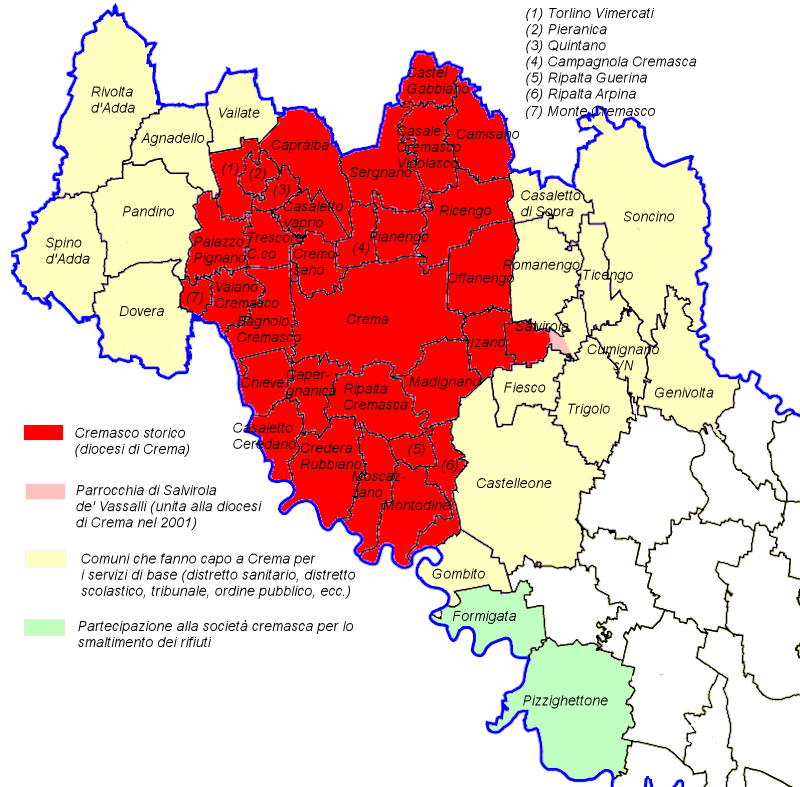
- Map showing the different areas of the Cremasque Territory
- Country: Italy
- Region: Lombardy
- Capital(s): Crema

Area
  - Total: 573.2 km^{2} (221.3 sq mi)
- Time zone: UTC+1 (CET)
  - Summer (DST): UTC+2 (CEST)

The Cremasque Territory (Cremish: Teretore cremàsch, Italian: Territorio cremasco) is a geographical area located in the Lombardy, corresponding to the northern part of the Province of Cremona, of which it represents the most industrialized and densely inhabited area. Its main center is the city of Crema and currently constitutes one of the 4 employment districts into which the province of Cremona is divided.

== History ==
The identity of the Cremasque territory and its inhabitants has been formed and consolidated around the city of Crema in the course of a centuries-old history, full of significant and lasting events that have distinguished and characterized this particular geographical area in a specific way.

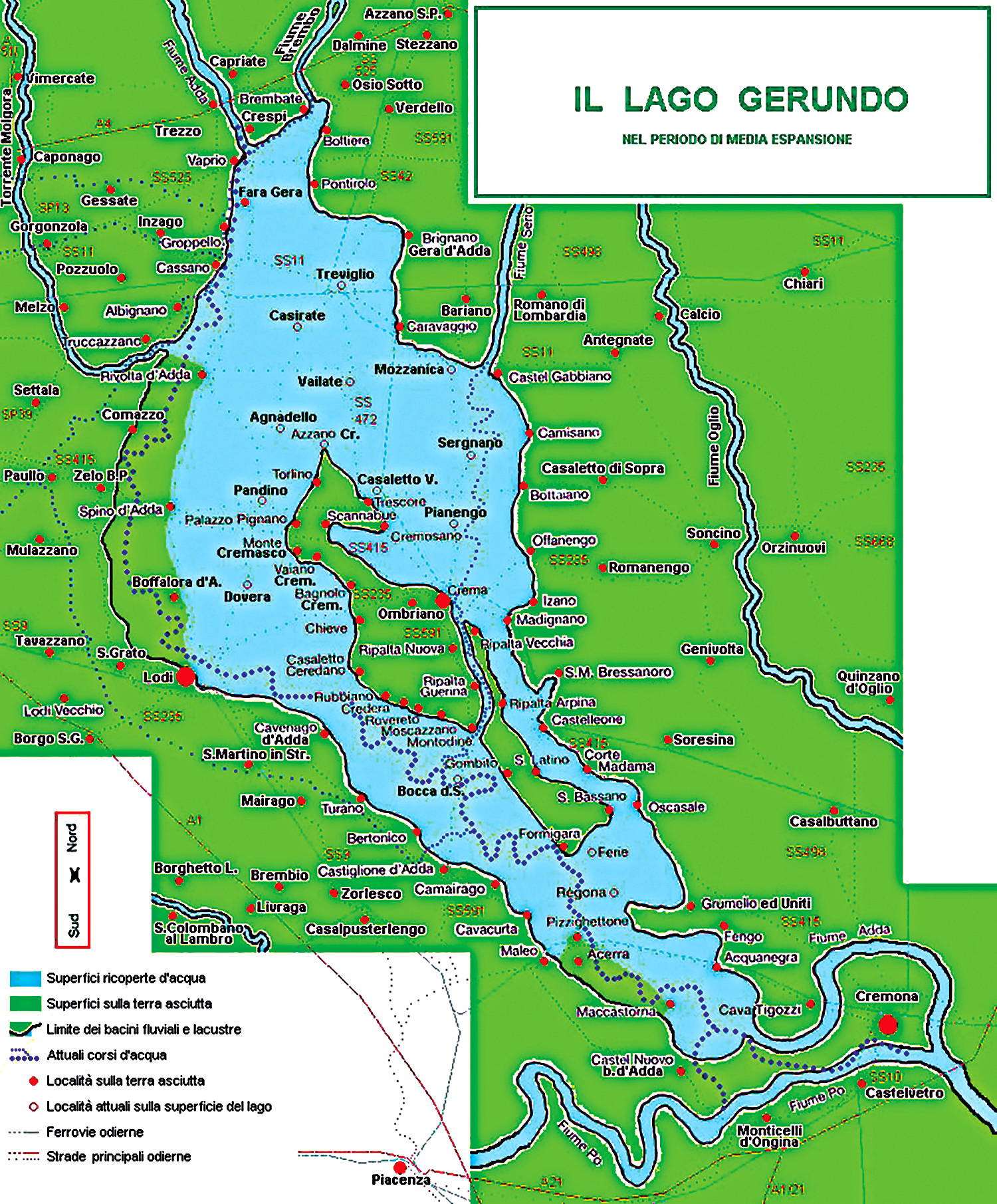

The first documentary quotes of the locality of Crema date back to the 11th century and, since 1084, it is constantly defined as castrum Cremæ, that is, a castle or a village protected by a belt of walls. If the historical certification of Crema is relatively late, its development as a center of attraction and power in the Fulcheria Island, the territory with ill-defined borders that surrounded it and to which is well attached the name of "island" because it is enclosed between the Adda and Serio rivers whose course widened into large swamps, called Lake Gerundo. The first written testimony of the name Insula Fulchéria (or Insula Fulchérii) dates back to February 1040, when the bishop of Cremona Ubaldo went to the court of Emperor Henry III to submit to him a document that would have granted the Cremonese diocese the districtio on the Insula Fulcherii at the expense of Boniface III of Canossa, margrave of Tuscany, who held it for feudal investiture.

Since this date, Cremona's interest in Crema and the Fulcheria Island is evident. Located close to the risorgive line, in a dominant position with respect to the waterways and land, at the intersection of the main north–south and east–west communication lines (Bergamo-Piacenza, Milan-Cremona, Brescia-Pavia), Crema and the Cremasque territory were a territory "in formation", strategically important although still unsustirable and unsuitable for cultivation because mostly covered by woods and above all by swamps and marshes, heritage of an ancient sea or Lake Gerundo and constantly fed by the numerous fountains. Water was therefore the characteristic element of the whole area, enclosed and intersected by important rivers (Adda, Tormo, Serio and Oglio) and frequently subject to their violent floods if not even bed variations. It is not excluded that a spontaneous or artificial change of the bed of Serio, bringing it very close to the nascent city of Crema, together with the intense reclamations started in that eleventh century, have contributed to stimulating the expansionist aims of the much more powerful nearby cities (Milan and Cremona in particular) in a period in which there is a general degradation of the feudal institutes and the Curtense economy alongside the re-flowering and repopulation of the cities and the strengthening within them of the new grades dedicated to craftsmanship and commerce, that city bourgeoisie that, organized in influential arts and crafts guilds, will obtain increasingly relevant political and economic powers until it achieves effective independence from the feudal "lord" and imposes the new municipal structures.

In 1335 Crema and its territory were annexed to the Duchy of Milan.

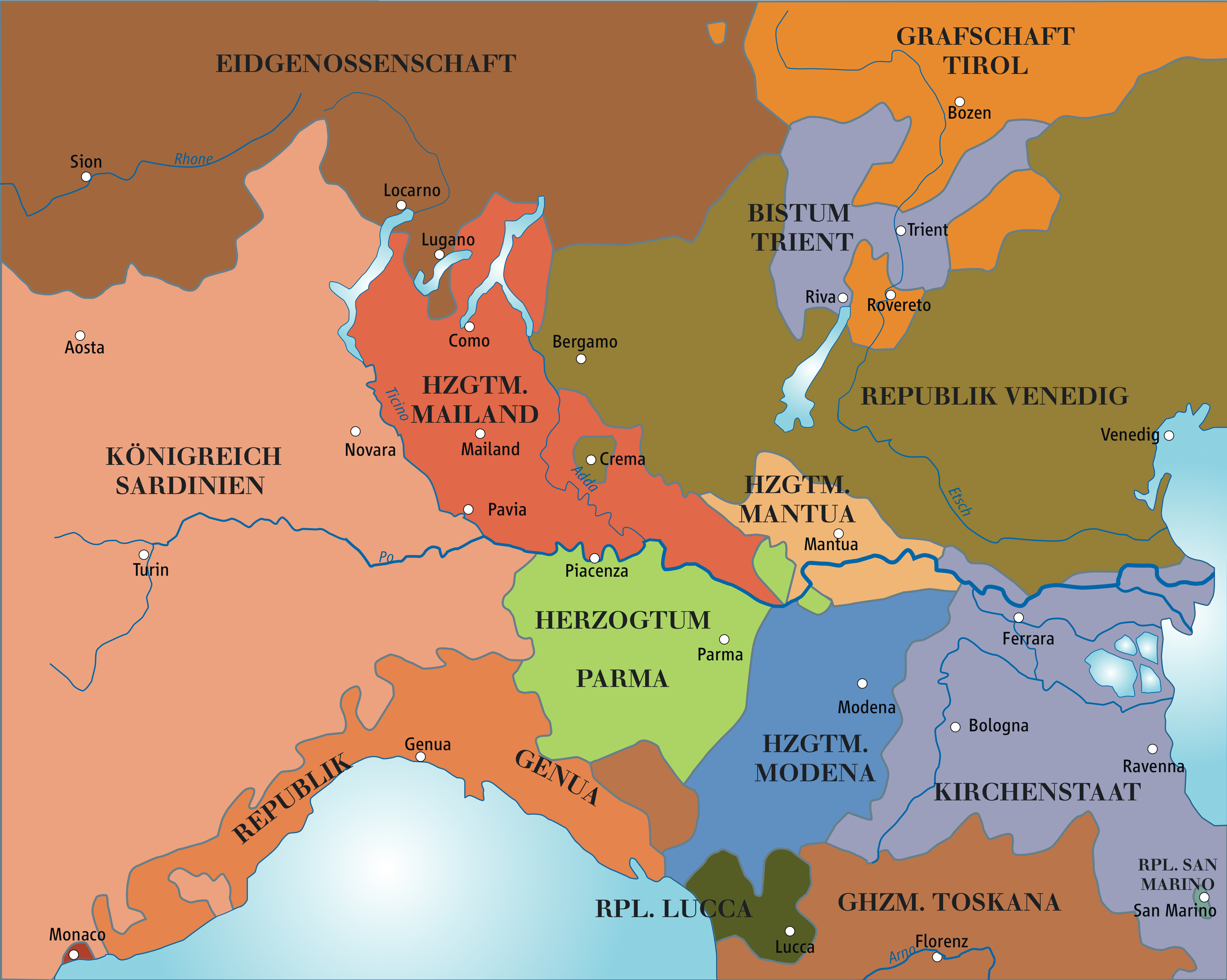

Starting in 1449, the Cremasque territory became part of the Republic of Venice, constituting a quasi-exclave included in the Duchy of Milan; a fortified and manned road, called "la Steccata" connected it to the Bergamo territory between Castel Gabbiano and Sola.

The Diocese of Crema was erected in 1580. Its borders coincide with those of the ancient Cremasque territory formed in the 11th to 12th centuries as a free municipality of Crema. In the Venetian period the representation of the Territory was entrusted to a council composed of a representative per municipality, who elected four mayors, one per door, who was entrusted with the provincial government. By the mid-eighteenth century, only the 28 main municipalities had retained the right to elect their own territorial councilor.

For a short period (from March 28, 1797, to July 10, 1797) Crema was the capital of the Republic of Crema, which was then dissolved and aggregated to the Cisalpine Republic.

After the Congress of Vienna this territory passed to the Austrian Empire who created the Kingdom of Lombard-Venetia. Crema and the territory became part of the province of Lodi and Crema, one of the 9 Lombard Provinces of the Government of Lombardy.

With the beginning of the Kingdom of Italy, the Cremasque territory, on request sent to the King and the government by eminent Cremasque personalities, became part of the Province of Cremona, a traditionally enemy city of Crema.

The territory has its own dialect, the Cremish dialect.

There have been various proposals to make the Cremasque territory a province, but none has ever been successful.

== Characteristics ==
The Cremasque territory is the most densely industrialized and inhabited area of the province of Cremona (despite constituting less than a third of the provincial territory, the Cremasque has 48% of the inhabitants).

The main centers, in addition to the capital Crema, are Rivolta d'Adda, Pandino and Spino d'Adda.

The Cremasque Territory is located at the beginning of the Lower Po Valley. For its location it is rich in resurgences and watercourses. Remediated the marshy land in the Middle Ages, the territory became very fertile for agriculture and rich in water-meadows.

From Crema there are the former State Road 415 Paullese Milano-Cremona, the former State Road 591 Cremasca Bergamo-Piacenza and the former State Road 235 of Orzinuovi Brescia-Pavia. In Castelleone, Madignano, Crema, Casaletto Vaprio and Capralba there are stations on the Treviglio–Cremona railway line.

== Historical subdivisions ==
In the fourteenth century, the Cremasque territory was divided into communities, called "villas", each of which fell under the jurisdiction of one of the 4 wall gates of the city of Crema:

- Porta Tadini (Pianengo)
  - Azzano, Bordogna, Campagnola, Campisico, Capralba, Casaletto Vaprio, Cremosano, Farinate, Gabbiano, Pianengo, Pieranica, Quintano, Santa Maria della Croce, Sergnano, Torlino, Trescore, Trezolasco, Vairano, and Vidolasco.
- Porta Revolta (Ripalta)
  - Bolzone, Castelnuovo, Credera, Madignano, Montodine, Moscazzano, Ripalta Arpina, Ripalta Guerrina, Ripalta Nuova, Ripalta Vecchia, Rovereto, San Michele, and Zappello.
- Porta Serio
  - Bottaiano, Camisano, Casale, Ceredella, Izano, Offanengo, Portico, Ricengo, Salvirola, San Bernardino and Vergonzana.
- Porta Ombriano
  - Bagnolo, Casaletto Ceredano, Capergnanica, Cascine Capri and Cascine Gandini, Chieve, Monte, Ombriano, Palazzo Pignano, Passarera, Rubbiano with Cascine San Carlo, Scannabue, and Vaiano.

== See also ==
- Venetian walls of Crema

== Bibliography ==
- Giuliana Albini, Da castrum a città: Crema fra XII e XV secolo, in Società e storia, n. 42 (XI), October-December 1988.
- Giancarlo Andenna, Le istituzioni ecclesiastiche dall'età longobarda alla fine del XIV secolo, in Giancarlo Andenna and Giorgio Chittolini (ed.), Storia di Cremona. Il Trecento. Chiesa e cultura (VIII-XIV secolo), Cremona, Comune, 2007.
- Francesco Sforza Benvenuti, Storia di Crema, Vol. 2, Milan, Tipografia Bernardoni, 1859.
- Marilena Casirani, Insediamenti e beni fiscali nell'alto Medioevo nell'"Insula Fulcheria", in Silvia Lusuardi Siena (ed.), Fonti archeologiche e iconografiche per la storia e la cultura degli insediamenti nell'alto Medioevo, Milan, Vita e Pensiero, 2003.
- Jörg Jarnut, Bergamo 568-1098. Storia istituzionale, sociale ed economica di una città lombarda nell'alto Medioevo, Bergamo, Archivio Bergamasco, 1981.
- Giovanni Vitolo, Medioevo. I caratteri originali di un'età di transizione, Milan, Sansoni, 2000.
