= Siege of Crema (1514) =

1514 military siege of Crema

Coordinates: 45.3588°N 9.7008°E

- Part of the War of the League of Cambrai
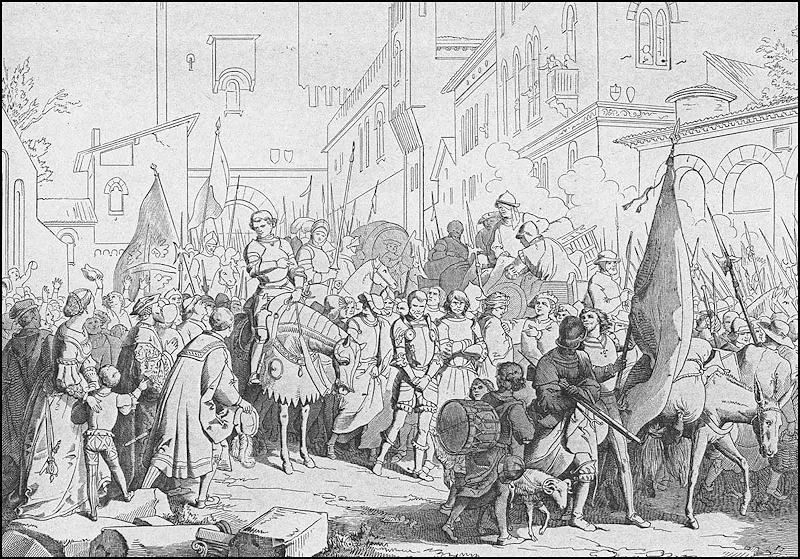
- Giuseppe Gatteri, Renzo da Ceri Triumphantly Enters Crema, from Storia Veneta Espressa in Centocinquanta Tavole, Grimaudo, 1867
Date	1513 – August 1514
Location	Crema, modern-day Italy
Result	Victory for the Republic of Venice

Belligerents
Duchy of Milan; Spanish Empire; Swiss Confederacy	Republic of Venice

Commanders and leaders
Prospero Colonna; Silvio Savelli; Cesare Fieramosca	(Republic of Venice) Renzo da Ceri

Strength
At least 6,000 infantry, plus an unspecified number of additional troops and cavalry under Cesare Fieramosca	Unknown

Casualties and losses
Unknown	Unknown

The siege of Crema in 1514 was a significant military engagement set within the broader context of political and martial upheaval in early 16th-century Italy, particularly during the War of the League of Cambrai.

== Background ==
=== 1509-1512 : French occupation and return to Venetian control ===
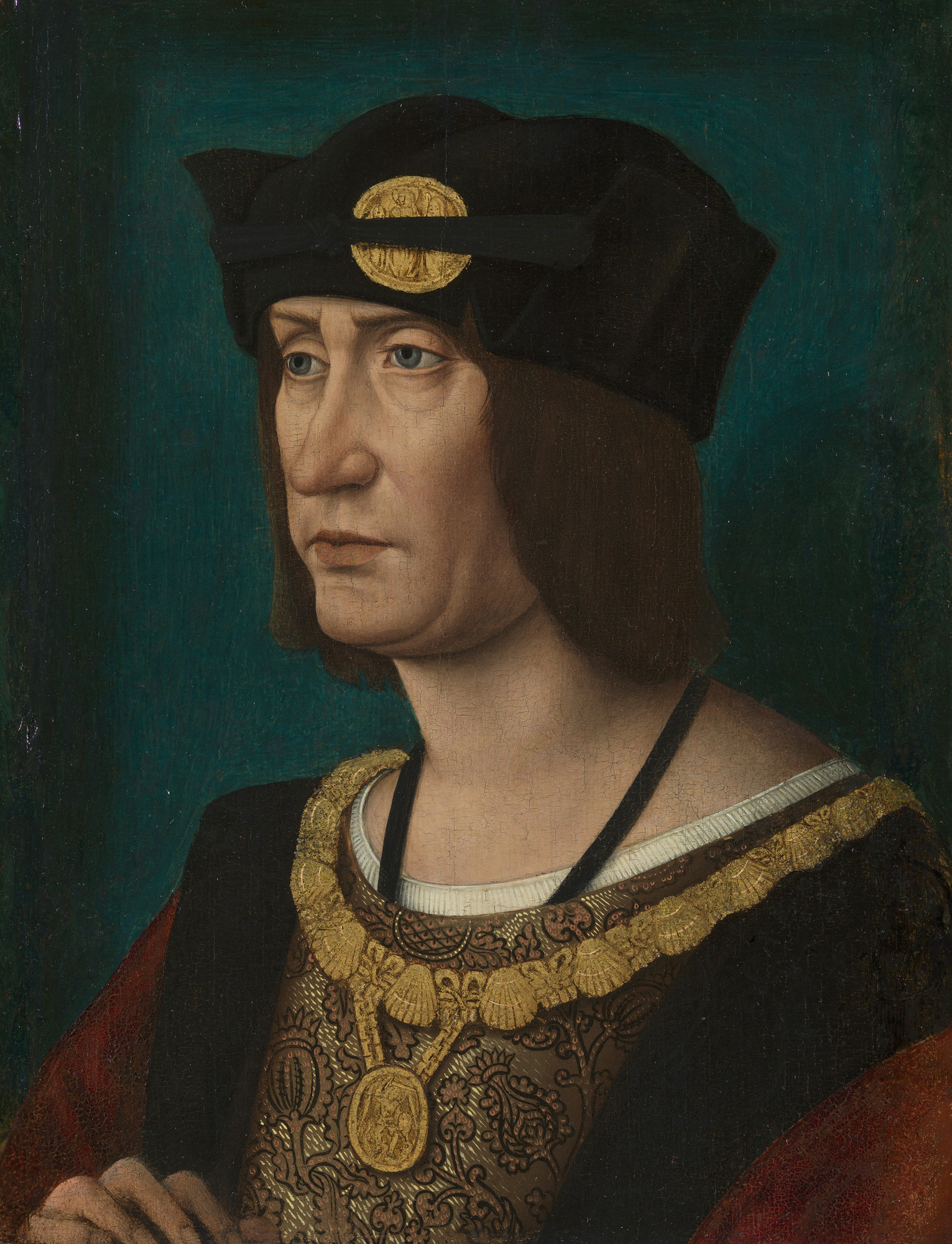
Workshop of Jean Perréal, Portrait of Louis XII, King of France, c. 1514

In the wake of the decisive Battle of Agnadello in 1509, a French herald approached the walls of Crema, demanding the city's surrender under threat of siege and annihilation by the French army. After heated debate, the city's Grand Council, swayed by the eloquence and pressure of Socino Benzoni, opted for submission. The French appointed Bernardo Ricaudo as governor and the Milanese Pier Antonio Casati as podestà, who formally welcomed King Louis XII on June 27, 1509. The king stayed for two days in the Benzoni Palace.

The French occupation did little to quell longstanding tensions between the Guelphs and Ghibellines, with the latter faction enjoying French protection. Arms smuggling flourished; Bernardino Bonzi, a boatman caught transporting weapons, was tried and brutally quartered.

Fearing external Venetian loyalists intent on reclaiming Crema, and with supplies dwindling, the French governor Duras expelled all males aged 15 to 60. Meanwhile, Socino Benzoni, sent to secure provisions from a French camp between Este and Montagnana, was ambushed by Stradioti mercenaries, taken to Padua, and hanged.

Many expelled Cremaschi fled to Montodine, where they received Venetian reinforcements. They regrouped near Ombriano, aiming to ambush French foraging parties raiding nearby villages. Additional support arrived as a tax of one-and-a-half soldi funded the recruitment of Bergamasque infantry and Val Trompia arquebusiers.
With these forces, it was decided to liberate Crema. Two camps were established at Ombriano and San Bernardino, complete with wooden bridges over the Serio river to pressure the occupiers. A peasant contingent, led by Franciscan friar Agostino Giliolo, encamped at Campagnola Cremasca.

Venice then dispatched Captain Renzo da Ceri (Lorenzo Orsini), who constructed two bastions to intensify the siege. Inside Crema, troops and residents struggled, yet Duras resisted surrender, urged on by the pro-French Crema native Guido Pace Bernardi. However, French commander Benedetto Crivelli turned the tide: he assassinated his colleague Gerolamo da Napoli and negotiated with Renzo da Ceri, surrendering Crema to Venice on September 9, 1512.

This capitulation narrowly preceded reinforcements led by Milanese captain Sante Robatto, who halted with 10,000 Swiss troops between Pandino, Palazzo Pignano, and Scannabue. Outmaneuvered by the Venetians, he withdrew beyond the Adda river.

=== 1512-1514: Shifting alliances ===
Crema remained heavily militarized, serving as a Venetian bridgehead to reclaim territories lost after Agnadello.

In 1512, Cardinal Matthäus Schiner, newly appointed Bishop of Novara, orchestrated the return of Duke Ercole Massimiliano Sforza to Milan. The city's authorities acquiesced to avoid a Swiss sack. Sforza entered via Porta Ticinese, flanked by Schiner and Spanish general Ramón de Cardona, a Holy League commander and Viceroy of Naples.

Meanwhile, Pope Julius II urged Venice to cede Verona and Vicenza to Maximilian I, but the Venetian Senate indignantly refused, determined to recover all territories lost post-Agnadello. In a dramatic reversal, Venice allied with France in the League of Blois on March 23, 1513, aiming to divide Lombardy: France would claim the Duchy of Milan, while Venice would regain Cremona and the Gera d'Adda. A Franco-Venetian army of 14,000 besieged Milan, forcing Sforza to retreat to Novara, defended by Swiss troops. Pursued by the coalition, the French were routed at the Battle of Novara (1513), abandoning their Milanese ambitions.

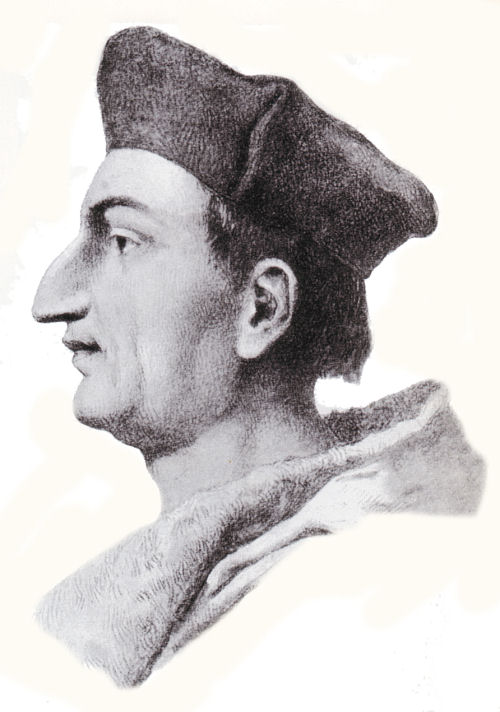
Albert Anker, portrait of Cardinal Matthäus Schiner, 19th century.

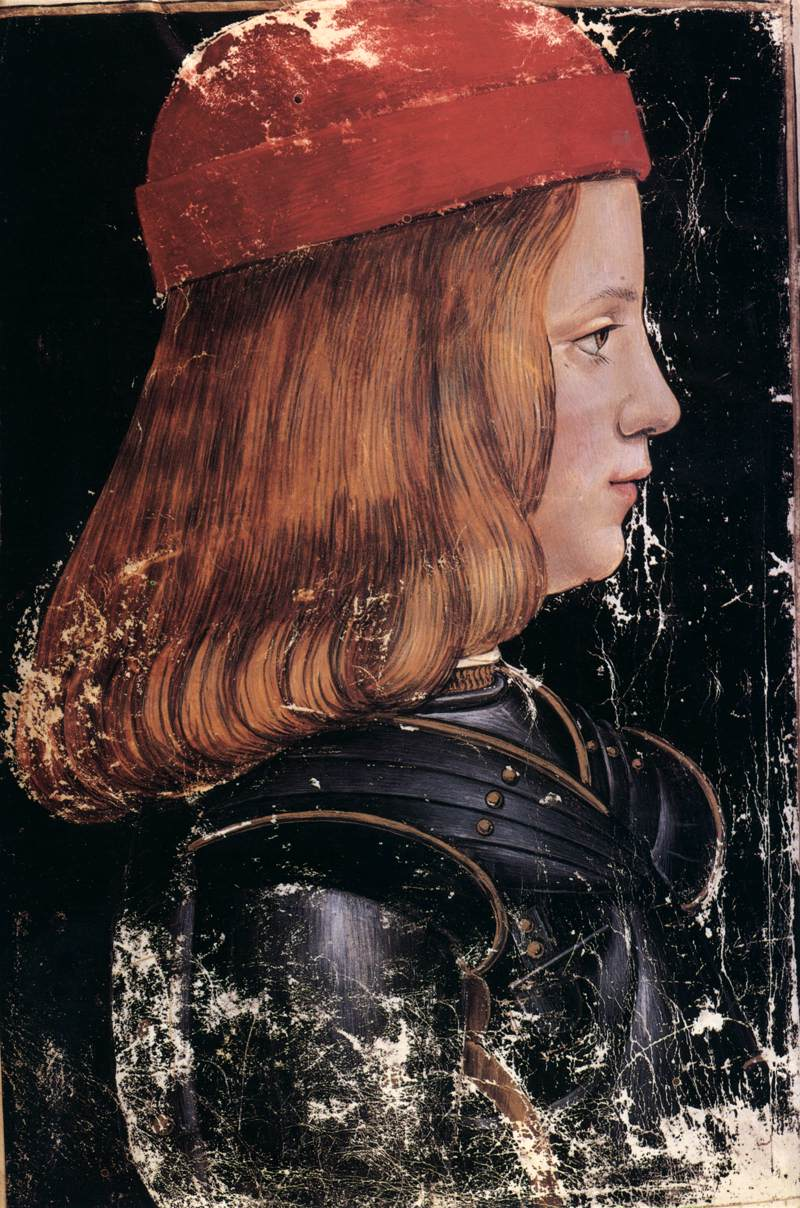
Giovanni Ambrogio de Predis, portrait of Ercole Massimiliano Sforza as a child, ca. 1496–1499.

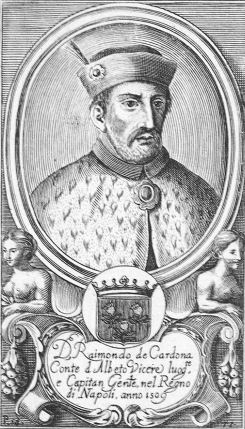
Anonymous author, portrait of Ramón de Cardona, Viceroy of Naples.

== The 1514 siege ==
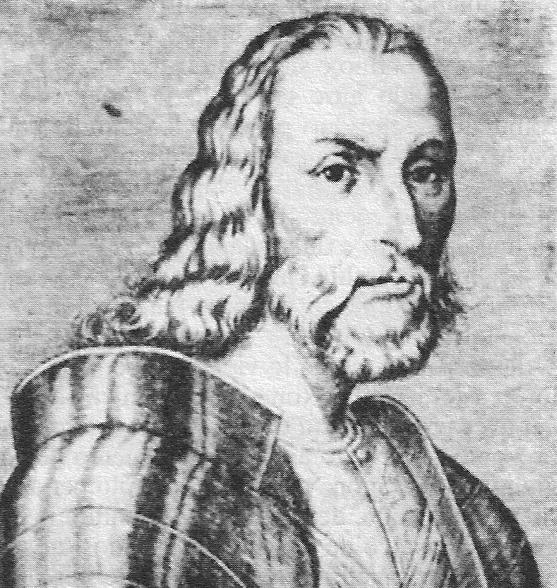
Portrait of the condottiero Prospero Colonna

As Venetian forces retreated, Viceroy Cardona advanced into Lombardy. Lacking troops to hold Brescia, Bergamo, and Cremona, Renzo da Ceri fell back to Crema, though sorties enabled Bergamo's recapture.

After his victory at the Battle of La Motta, Spanish condottiero Prospero Colonna arrived with 3,000 infantrymen, encamping along the road to Offanengo. Silvio Savelli led an equal number of Milanese troops near Ombriano, bolstered by Cesare Fieramosca's cavalry and soldiers near Pianengo.

Raids for supplies displaced peasants, with some 36,000 crowding beneath Crema's walls in dire sanitary conditions, triggering a plague that killed at least 16,000. Around 400 citizens—mostly nobles and monks—fled to Lodi, Abbadia Cerreto, Piacenza, or Venice, some bribing guards or disguising themselves as peasants.

Renzo da Ceri fortified the Basilica of Santa Maria della Croce, razing nearby homes and trees, and repelled Fieramosca's assaults. By August 1514, Crema's populace faced starvation, and funds for soldiers ran dry. Da Ceri seized treasures from the Mount of Piety and Santa Maria, minting "petacchie" coins (15 Milanese soldi) bearing St. Mark's image.

Facing imminent surrender, Da Ceri launched a desperate offensive on the night of August 25–26. He split his forces: Antonio Pietrasanta and Baldassarre da Romano led two groups outside Porta Ombriano; Giacomo Micinello's 100 horsemen rode toward Capergnanica; Andrea Matria, with 700 infantrymen and 400 peasants, circled the Moso swamp via Trescore Cremasco and Scannabue to reach Bagnolo. Da Ceri and podestà Bartolomeo Contarini guarded Porta Serio to counter Colonna's potential relief.

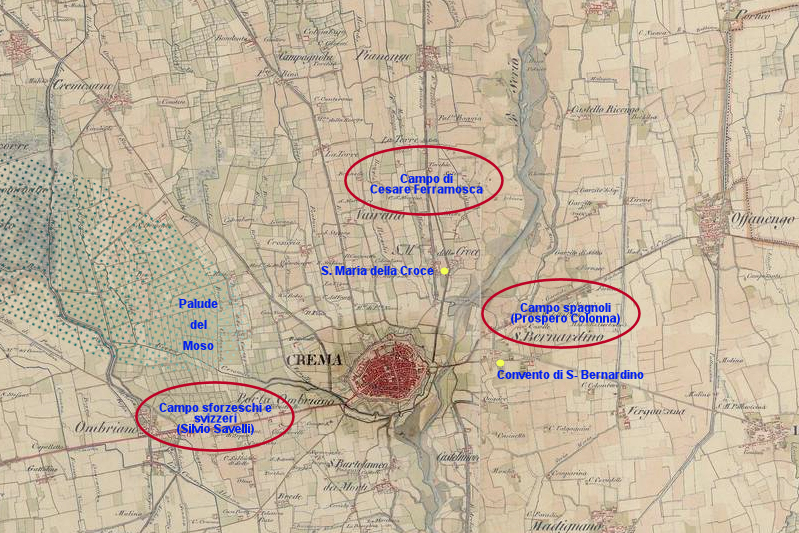
The dislocation of the encampments around the city

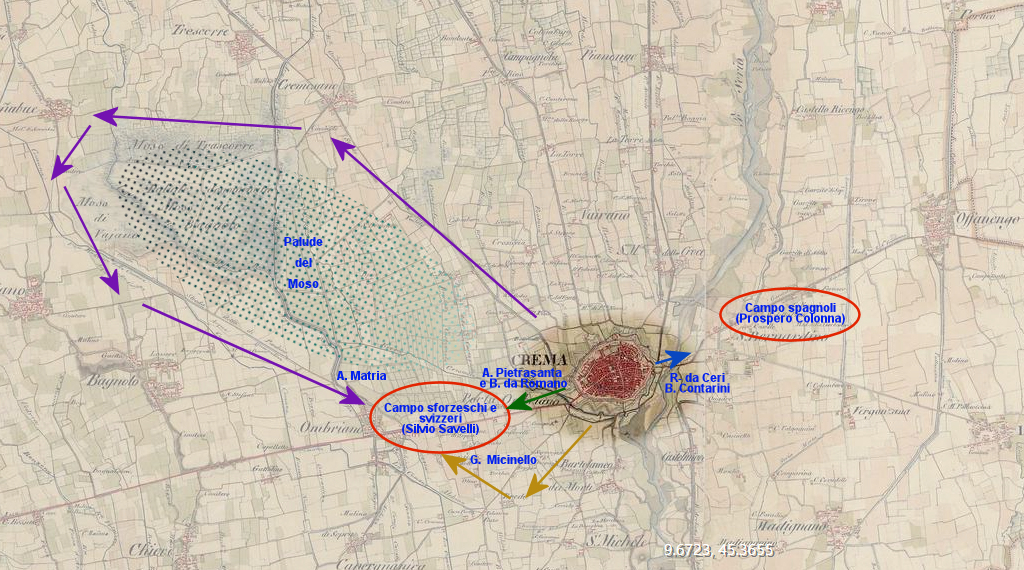
Simplified diagram of the final assault on Milanese and Swiss forces

Matria's troops struck Savelli's camp from behind at midnight. Caught off-guard—many sentries asleep—the Milanese were slaughtered or burned in flaming tents. A thousand Swiss held the Roggia Alchina line until pro-Cremaschi reinforcements overwhelmed them.

The enemy positions collapsed. Colonna, uninformed and possibly mistaking the fires for Savelli's doing, did not intervene. Da Ceri spared Colonna's camp, which withdrew to Romanengo. The San Bernardino Monastery was razed to deny Colonna a foothold.

On August 26, Da Ceri presented three captured Milanese banners and artillery to the Cathedral in thanksgiving. Meanwhile, the locals looted the defeated camp and killed the few survivors.

== See also ==
- War of the League of Cambrai
- History of the Republic of Venice

== Bibliography ==
- Fino, Alemanio (1844). Storia di Crema raccolta da Alemanio Fino dagli annali di M. Pietro Terni, ristampata con annotazioni di Giuseppe Racchetti per cura di Giovanni Solera [History of Crema Collected by Alemanio Fino from the Annals of M. Pietro Terni, Reprinted with Annotations by Giuseppe Racchetti under the Care of Giovanni Solera] (in Italian). Milano: Colombo & Cordani.
- Benvenuti, Francesco Sforza (1859). Storia di Crema [History of Crema] (in Italian). Milano: Giuseppe Bernardoni di Gio.
- Beltrami, Luca (1885). Il castello di Milano sotto il dominio degli Sforza [The Castle of Milan Under the Dominion of the Sforza] (in Italian). Crema: Luigi Bajnoni libraio.
- Benvenuti, Francesco Sforza (1888). Dizionario biografico cremasco [Cremasque Biographical Dictionary] (in Italian). Bologna: Forni editore.
- Piantelli, Francesco (1985). Folclore cremasco [Cremasque Folklore] (in Italian). Arti grafiche cremasche.
- Zucchelli, Giorgio (2005). Architetture dello Spirito: San Rocco di Vergonzana e San Bernardino fuori le mura [Architectures of the Spirit: San Rocco di Vergonzana and San Bernardino Outside the Walls] (in Italian). Il Nuovo Torrazzo.
- Gatani, Tindaro (2015). "Gli svizzeti signori della Lombardia" [The Swiss Lords of Lombardy]. La Rivista (in Italian). 106 (6). Germignaga: Camera di Commercio Italiana per la Svizzera.
