= Crespiatica =

Crespiatica Crespiàdega (Lombard)
- Comune
- Comune di Crespiatica
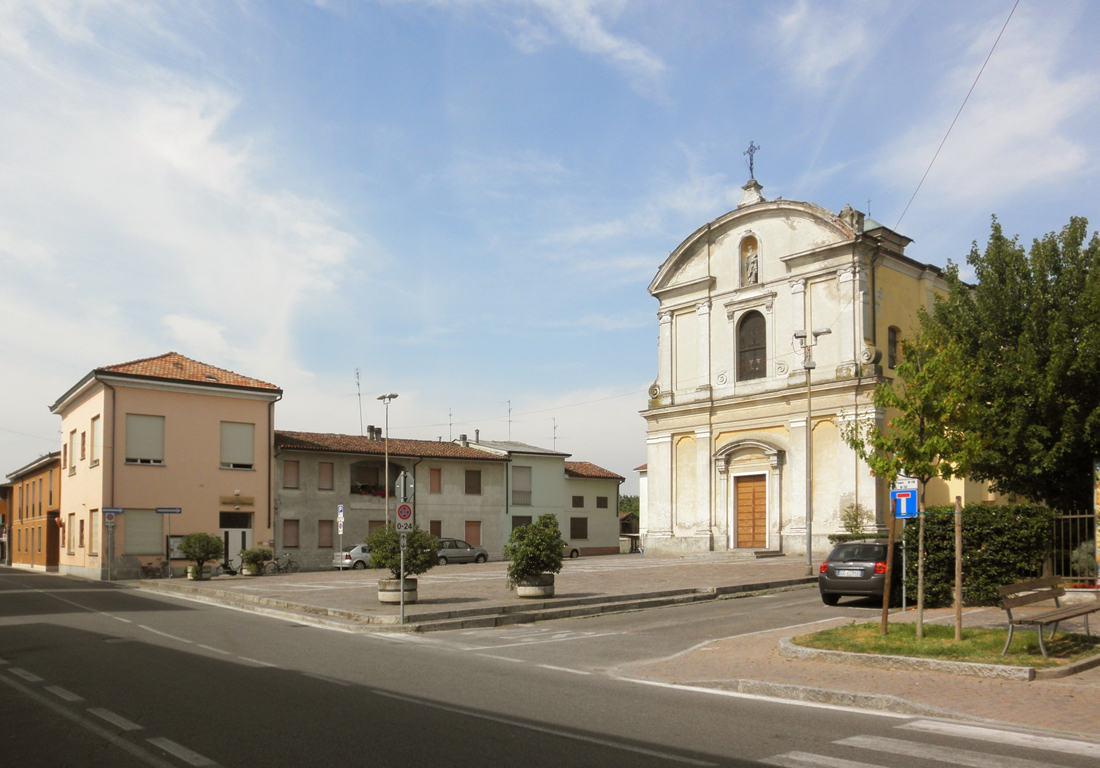

- Coat of arms

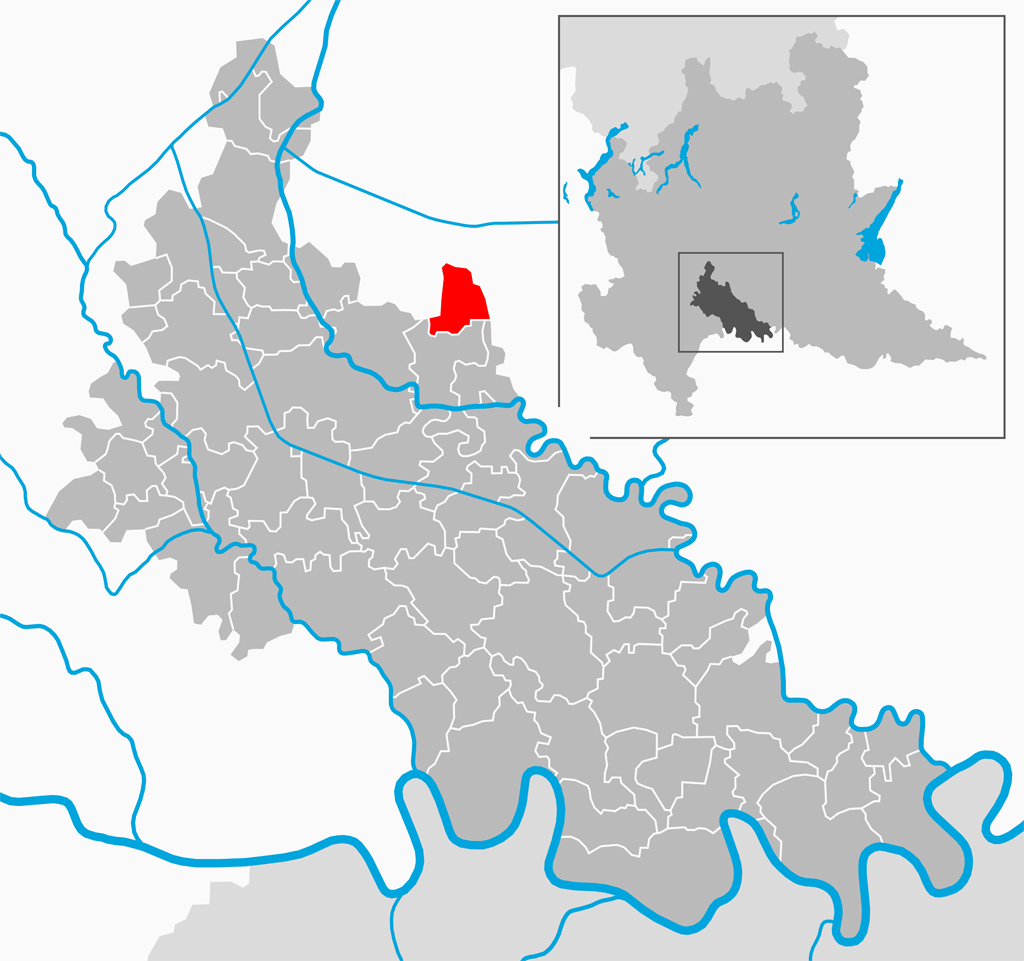

- Location within Italy Location within Lombardy
- Coordinates: 45°18′N 9°35′E
- Country: Italy
- Region: Lombardy
- Province: Lodi (LO)
- Frazioni: Tormo, Benzona

Government
  - Mayor: Fabrizio Rossi

Area
  - Total: 7.03 km^{2} (2.71 sq mi)
- Elevation: 75 m (246 ft)

Population (30 June 2017)
  - Total: 2,281
  - Density: 324/km^{2} (840/sq mi)
- Demonym: Crespiatichesi
- Time zone: UTC+1 (CET)
  - Summer (DST): UTC+2 (CEST)
- Postal code: 26835
- Dialing code: 0371
- Website: Official website

Crespiatica (Lodigiano: Crespiàdega) is a comune (municipality) in the Province of Lodi in the Italian region Lombardy, located about 40 kilometres (25 mi) southeast of Milan and about 7 kilometres (4 mi) southeast of Lodi.

Crespiatica borders the following municipalities: Dovera, Bagnolo Cremasco, Vaiano Cremasco, Monte Cremasco, Chieve, Corte Palasio, Abbadia Cerreto.
