= Isso, Lombardy =

Isso
- Comune
- Comune di Isso
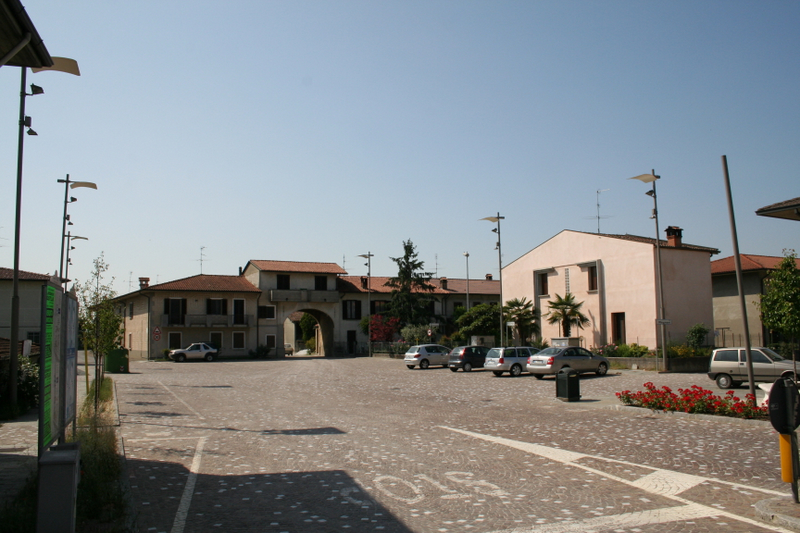
- Municipal square

- Coat of arms

- Location within Italy Location within Lombardy
- Coordinates: 45°29′N 9°46′E
- Country: Italy
- Region: Lombardy
- Province: Bergamo (BG)

Government
  - Mayor: Rocco Maccali

Area
  - Total: 5.06 km^{2} (1.95 sq mi)
- Elevation: 104 m (341 ft)

Population (28 February 2017)
  - Total: 637
  - Density: 126/km^{2} (326/sq mi)
- Demonym: Issesi
- Time zone: UTC+1 (CET)
  - Summer (DST): UTC+2 (CEST)
- Postal code: 24040
- Dialing code: 0363
- Website: Official website

Isso (Bergamasque: Iss) is a comune (municipality) in the Province of Bergamo in the Italian region of Lombardy, located about 45 kilometres (28 mi) east of Milan and about 25 kilometres (16 mi) southeast of Bergamo.

Isso borders the following municipalities: Barbata, Camisano, Castel Gabbiano, Covo, Fara Olivana con Sola.
