= Vaiano Cremasco =

- Comune
- Comune di Vaiano Cremasco
- Location within Italy Location within Lombardy
- Coordinates: 45°22′N 9°35′E
- Country: Italy
- Region: Lombardy
- Province: Cremona (CR)

Government
  - Mayor: Paolo Primo Molaschi

Area
  - Total: 6.15 km^{2} (2.37 sq mi)
- Elevation: 82 m (269 ft)

Population (31 December 2015)
  - Total: 3,755
  - Density: 611/km^{2} (1,580/sq mi)
- Demonym: Vaianesi
- Time zone: UTC+1 (CET)
  - Summer (DST): UTC+2 (CEST)
- Postal code: 26010
- Dialing code: 0373
- Website: Official website

Vaiano Cremasco (Cremish: Vaià) is a comune (municipality) in the Province of Cremona in the Italian region Lombardy, located about 35 kilometres (22 mi) southeast of Milan and about 45 kilometres (28 mi) northwest of Cremona.

Vaiano Cremasco borders the following municipalities: Bagnolo Cremasco, Crespiatica, Monte Cremasco, Palazzo Pignano, Trescore Cremasco.

== Twin towns ==
Vaiano Cremasco is twinned with:

- Veigy-Foncenex, France
- Puerto Padre, Cuba
