= Cavenago d'Adda =

Cavenago d'Adda Cavenagh (Lombard)
- Comune
- Comune di Cavenago d'Adda
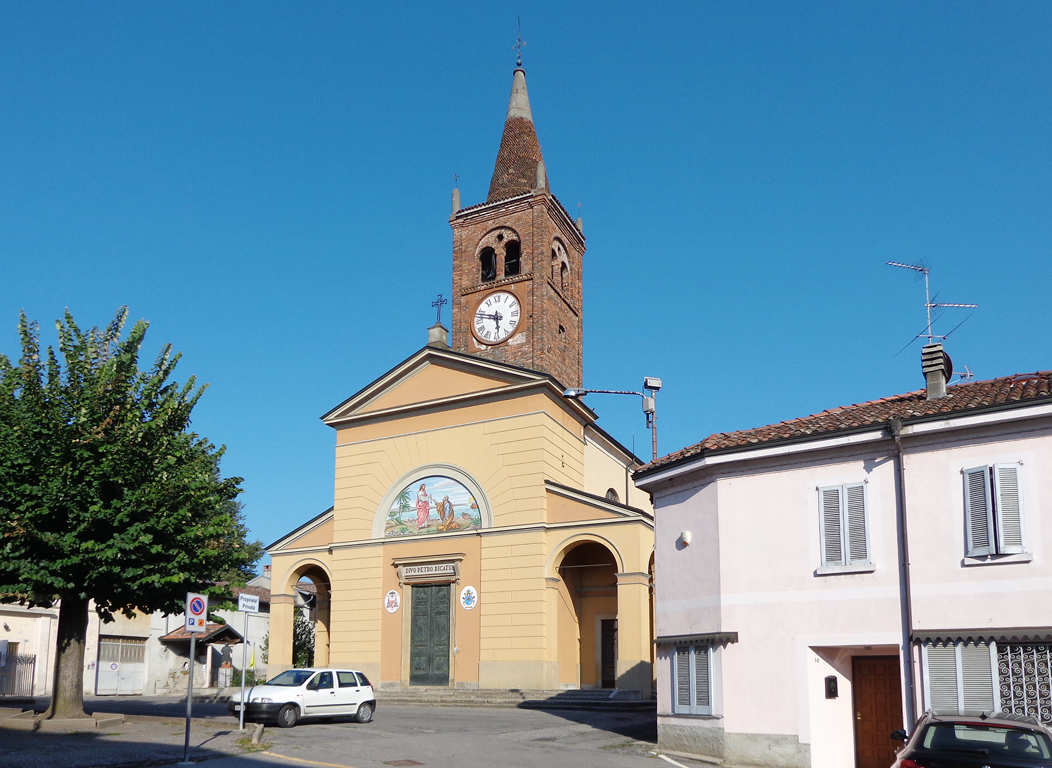

- Coat of arms

- Location within Italy Location within Lombardy
- Coordinates: 45°18′N 9°35′E
- Country: Italy
- Region: Lombardy
- Province: Lodi (LO)
- Frazioni: Caviaga, Soltarico

Government
  - Mayor: Sergio Curti

Area
  - Total: 16.2 km^{2} (6.3 sq mi)
- Elevation: 73 m (240 ft)

Population (30 June 2017)
  - Total: 2,218
  - Density: 137/km^{2} (355/sq mi)
- Demonym: Cavenaghini
- Time zone: UTC+1 (CET)
  - Summer (DST): UTC+2 (CEST)
- Postal code: 26824
- Dialing code: 0371

Cavenago d'Adda (Lodigiano: Cavenagh) is a comune (municipality) in the Province of Lodi in the Italian region Lombardy, located about 40 kilometres (25 mi) southeast of Milan and about 7 kilometres (4 mi) southeast of Lodi. It is between the Adda River and the Muzza Canal.

Cavenago d'Adda borders the following municipalities: Corte Palasio, Abbadia Cerreto, Casaletto Ceredano, Credera Rubbiano, San Martino in Strada, Turano Lodigiano, Mairago, Ossago Lodigiano.

== History ==
Already populated in ancient Roman times, in the Middle Ages the area of Cavenago d'Adda belonged to the bishop of Lodi (10th century), and was later a fief of the family of Fissiraga (1297–1482), the Bocconi of Mozzanica, and finally of the Cavenaghi Clerici. It included the population of Persia, now a frazione of Casaletto Ceredano.

In the Napoleonic era (1809–16) it was attached to the municipality of Robecco, which however became again independent after the constitution of the Kingdom of Lombardy–Venetia. In 1863 it assumed the official name of Cavenago Cavenago d'Adda, to distinguish itself from Cavenago of Brianza.

In 1869 the municipality of Cavenago d'Adda received the territories of the former communes of Caviaga and Soltarico. After World War II, in the hamlet of Caviaga Agip discovered large reserves of natural gas.

== People ==
- Emilio Giuseppe Dossena, artist
