= Dovera =

Dovera Duéra (Lombard)
- Comune
- Comune di Dovera
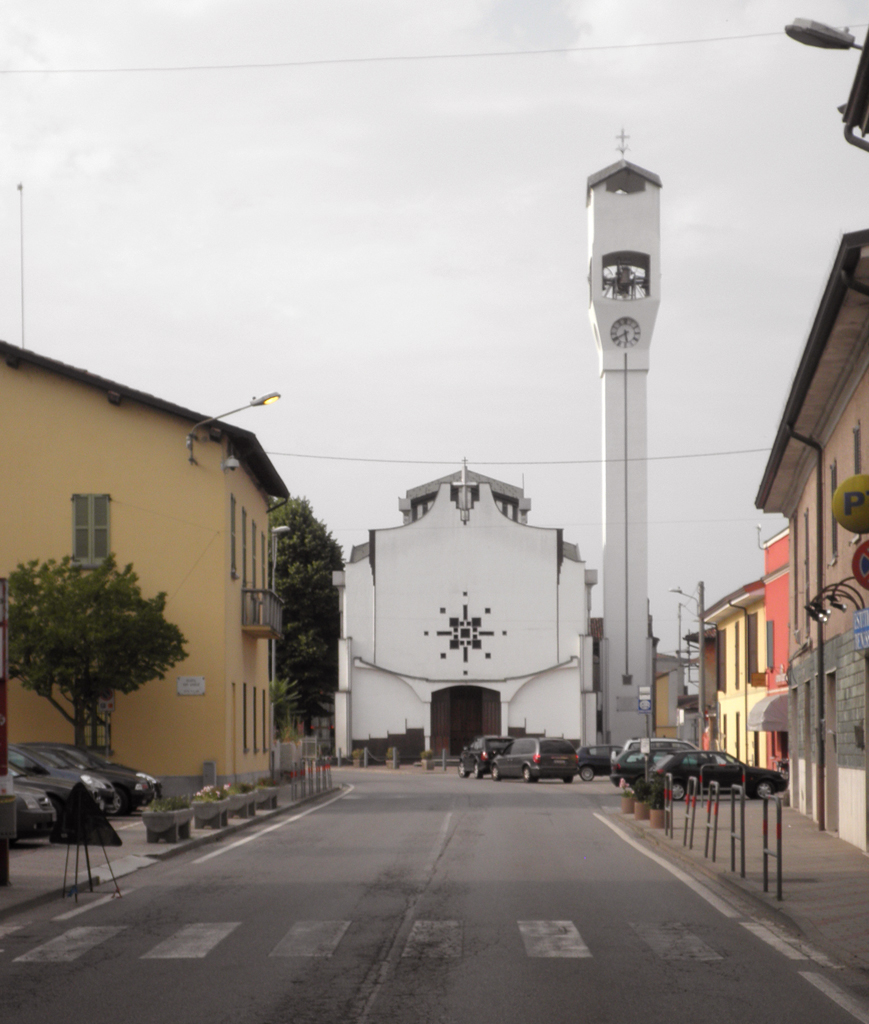

- Location within Italy Location within Lombardy
- Coordinates: 45°22′N 9°32′E
- Country: Italy
- Region: Lombardy
- Province: Cremona (CR)
- Frazioni: Barbuzzera, Postino Dovera, Roncadello, San Rocco

Government
  - Mayor: Paolo Mirko Signoroni

Area
  - Total: 20.65 km^{2} (7.97 sq mi)
- Elevation: 73 m (240 ft)

Population (31 July 2017)
  - Total: 3,850
  - Density: 186/km^{2} (483/sq mi)
- Demonym: Doveresi
- Time zone: UTC+1 (CET)
  - Summer (DST): UTC+2 (CEST)
- Postal code: 26010
- Dialing code: 0373
- Website: Official website

Dovera (Cremasco: Duéra) is a comune (municipality) in the Province of Cremona in the Italian region Lombardy, located about 30 kilometres (19 mi) southeast of Milan and about 45 kilometres (28 mi) northwest of Cremona.

Dovera borders the following municipalities: Boffalora d'Adda, Corte Palasio, Crespiatica, Lodi, Monte Cremasco, Pandino, Spino d'Adda.
