= Abbadia Cerreto =

- Comune
- Comune di Abbadia Cerreto
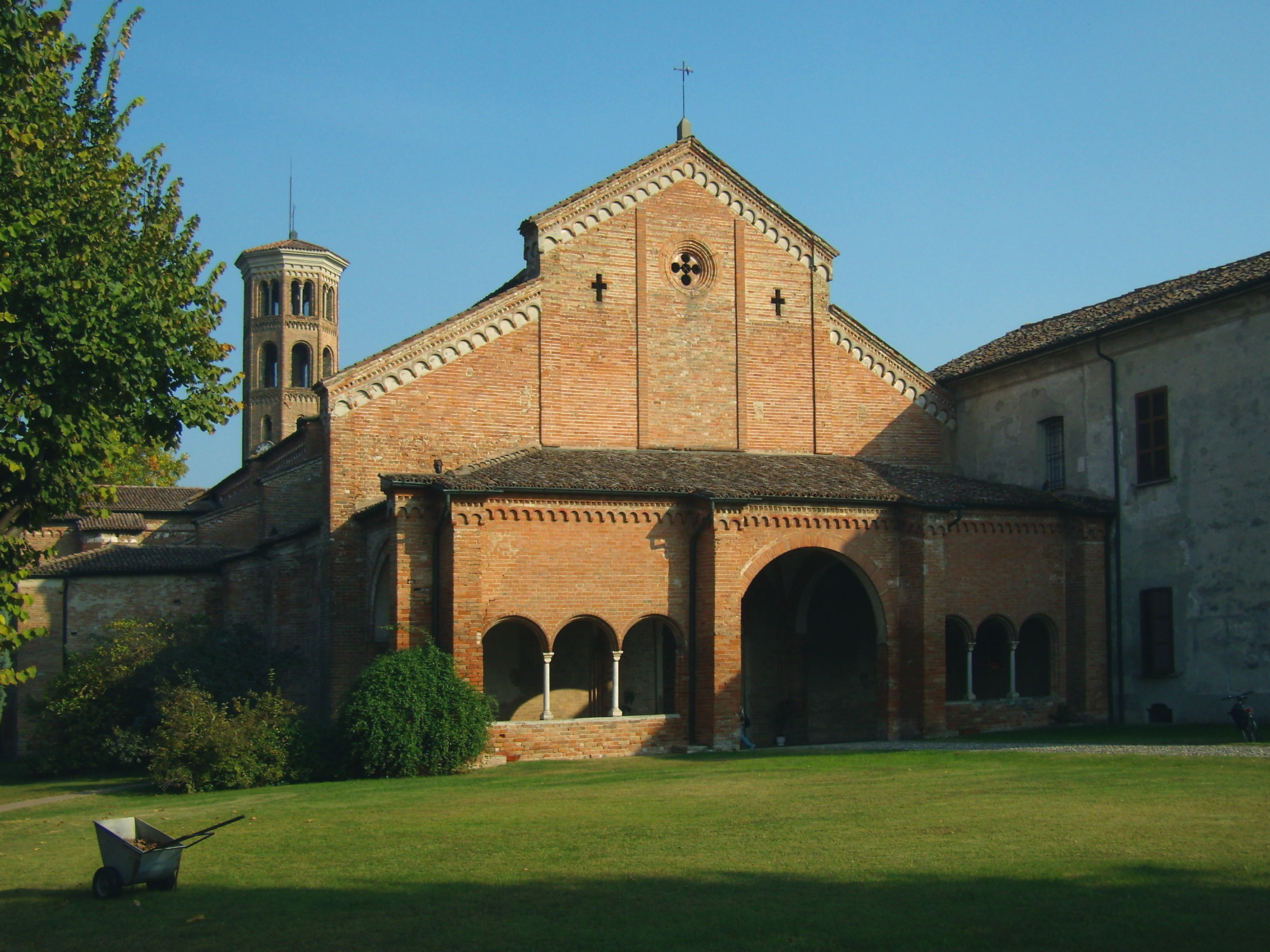
- The abbey

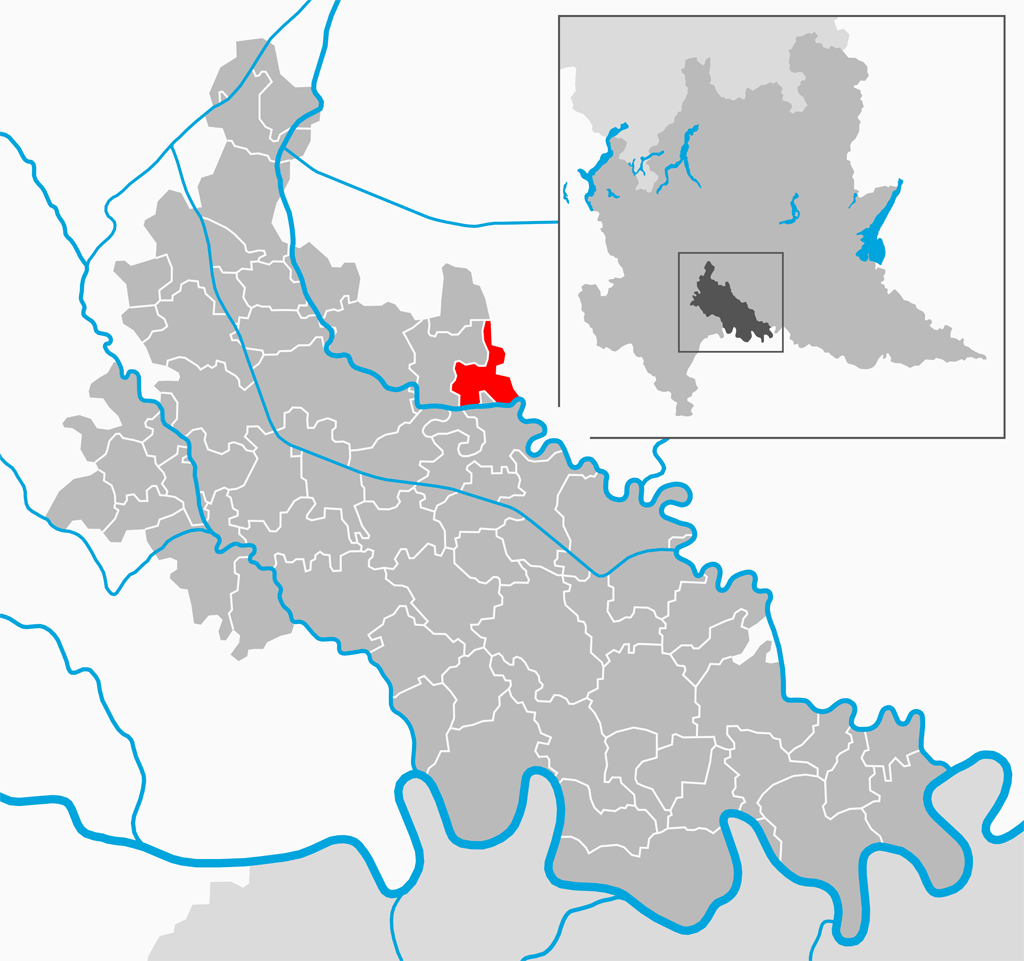

- Location of Abbadia Cerreto in Italy Abbadia Cerreto (Lombardy)
- Coordinates: 45°18′N 9°35′E
- Country: Italy
- Region: Lombardy
- Province: Lodi (LO)

Government
  - Mayor: Agostina Marazzi

Area
  - Total: 6.2 km^{2} (2.4 sq mi)
- Elevation: 64 m (210 ft)

Population (30 April 2017)
  - Total: 281
  - Density: 45/km^{2} (120/sq mi)
- Demonym: Cerretesi
- Time zone: UTC+1 (CET)
  - Summer (DST): UTC+2 (CEST)
- Postal code: 26834
- Dialing code: 0371
- Website: Official website

Abbadia Cerreto (Western Lombard: Serè) is a comune (municipality) located 40 kilometres (25 mi) southeast of Milan and 7 kilometres (4 mi) southeast of Lodi in the Province of Lodi, Lombardy, Italy.

Abbadia Cerreto borders the following municipalities: Bagnolo Cremasco, Crespiatica, Chieve, Corte Palasio, Casaletto Ceredano, Cavenago d'Adda. Its name comes from the local Benedictine abbey, founded in 1084 by Alberic of Monte Cassino.
