= Camisano =

Camisano may refer to:

- Camisano, Lombardy, a comune in the Province of Cremona, Italy
- Camisano Vicentino, a comune in the Province of Vicenza, Italy
