= Casaletto =

Casaletto may refer to the following communes in Italy:

- Casaletto Ceredano, in the province of Cremona
- Casaletto di Sopra, in the province of Cremona
- Casaletto Lodigiano, in the province of Lodi
- Casaletto Spartano, in the province of Salerno
- Casaletto Vaprio, in the province of Cremona
