= San Michele Arcangelo, Antegnate =

Church in Antegnate, Italy

Coordinates: 45°29′05″N 9°47′24″E

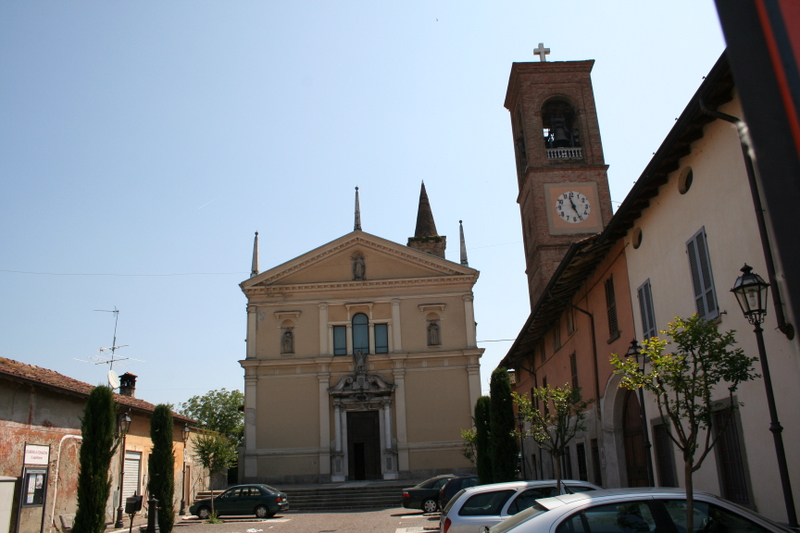
Church and belltower

San Michele Arcangelo is a renaissance-style, Roman Catholic parish church located in the town of Antegnate, province of Bergamo, region of Lombardy, Italy.

== History ==
The church is named for Saint Michael the archangel.

According to documents, a church at the site was present by the 10th century. Rebuilt in the 15th century with a bell-tower dating to between the 13th and 14th centuries. The interior contains frescoes from the 15th and 16th centuries and three paintings depicting the Virgin with Saints. Another canvas is attributed to Girolamo Romanino. Behind the main altar is an 18th-century chapel-sanctuary dedicated to the Virgin, accessed through a stairway. The chapel is richly decorated and frescoed with stories from the Life of the Virgin.

== See also ==
- Many churches are similarly named and some are listed here
- Website (in Italian)
