= Chieve =

Chieve Céef (Lombard)
- Comune
- Comune di Chieve
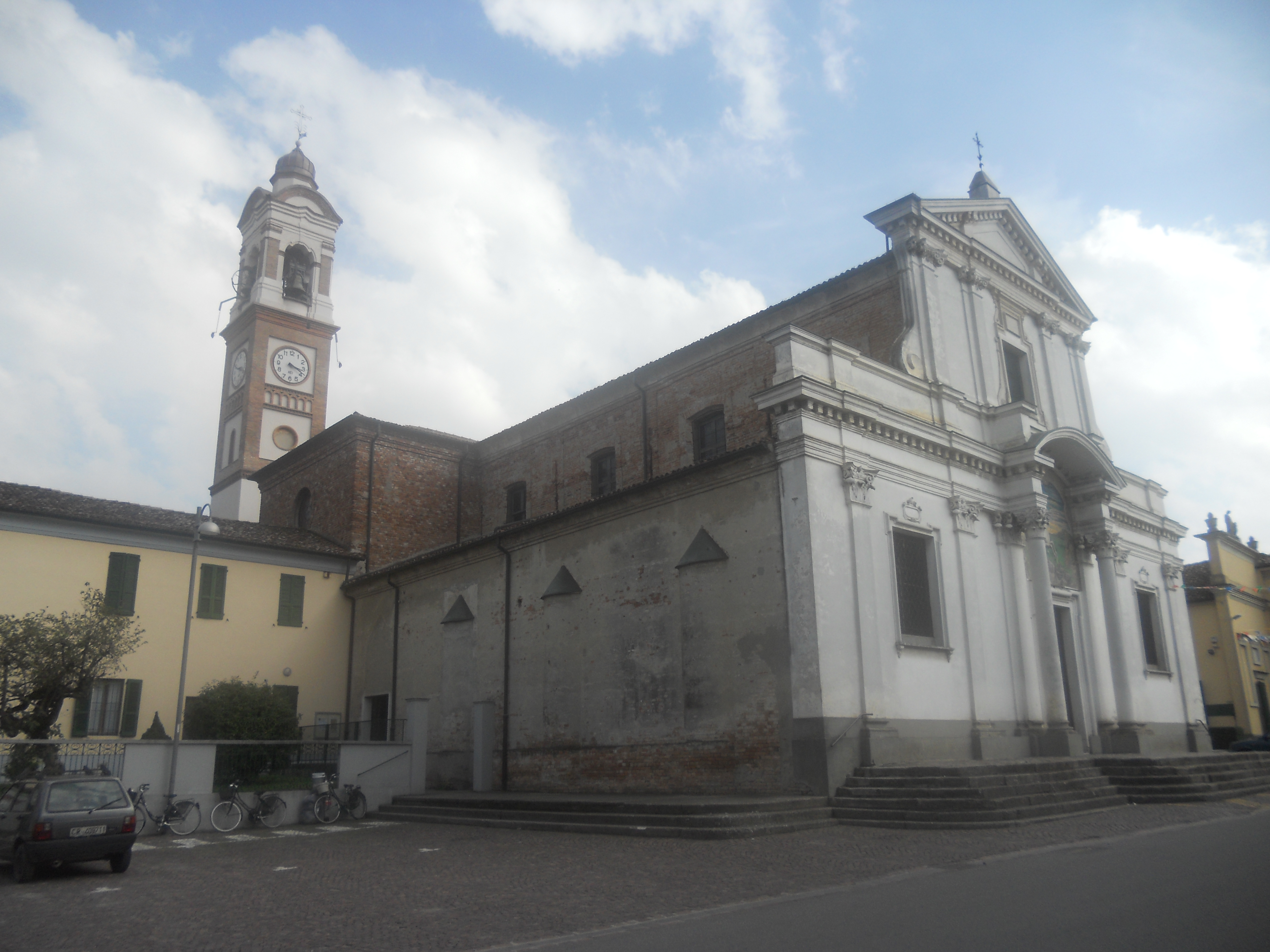

- Location within Italy Location within Lombardy
- Coordinates: 45°21′N 9°37′E
- Country: Italy
- Region: Lombardy
- Province: Cremona (CR)

Government
  - Mayor: Davide Bettinelli

Area
  - Total: 6.19 km^{2} (2.39 sq mi)
- Elevation: 77 m (253 ft)

Population (30 June 2017)
  - Total: 2,284
  - Density: 369/km^{2} (956/sq mi)
- Demonym: Chievesi
- Time zone: UTC+1 (CET)
  - Summer (DST): UTC+2 (CEST)
- Postal code: 26010
- Dialing code: 0373
- Website: Official website

Chieve (Cremasco: Céef) is a comune (municipality) in the Province of Cremona in the Italian region Lombardy, located about 40 kilometres (25 mi) southeast of Milan and about 40 kilometres (25 mi) northwest of Cremona.

Chieve borders the following municipalities: Abbadia Cerreto, Bagnolo Cremasco, Capergnanica, Casaletto Ceredano, Crema, Crespiatica.
