= Sergnano =

Sergnano Sergnà (Lombard)
- Comune
- Comune di Sergnano
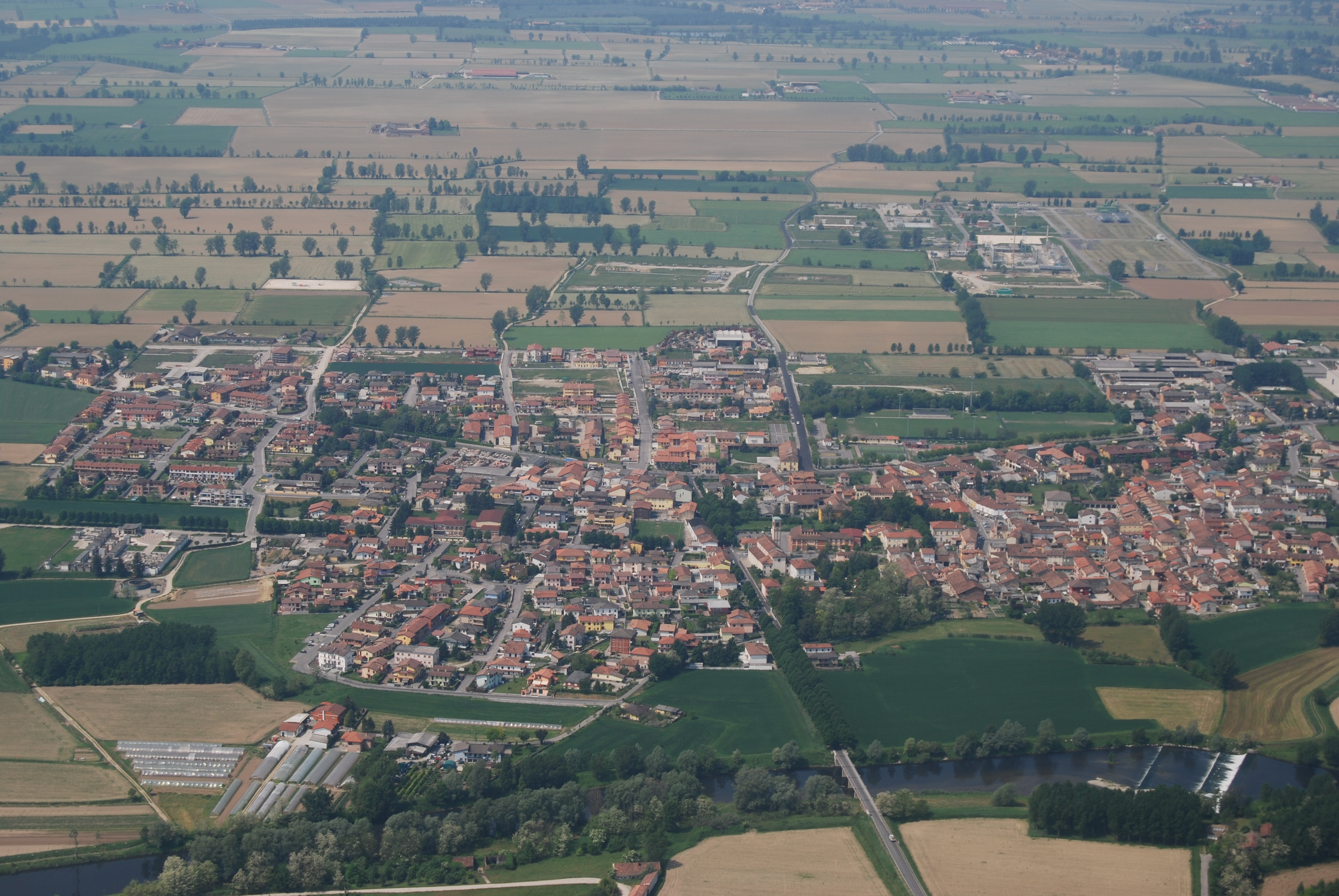

- Location within Italy Location within Lombardy
- Coordinates: 45°26′N 9°42′E
- Country: Italy
- Region: Lombardy
- Province: Cremona (CR)

Government
  - Mayor: Gianluigi Bernardi

Area
  - Total: 12.31 km^{2} (4.75 sq mi)
- Elevation: 88 m (289 ft)

Population (30 September 2015)
  - Total: 3,592
  - Density: 291.8/km^{2} (755.7/sq mi)
- Demonym: Sergnanesi
- Time zone: UTC+1 (CET)
  - Summer (DST): UTC+2 (CEST)
- Postal code: 26010
- Dialing code: 0373

Sergnano (Cremasco: Sergnà) is a comune (municipality) in the Province of Cremona in the Italian region of Lombardy, it is located about 40 kilometres (25 mi) east of Milan and about 40 kilometres (25 mi) northwest of Cremona.

Sergnano borders the following municipalities: Campagnola Cremasca, Capralba, Caravaggio, Casale Cremasco-Vidolasco, Castel Gabbiano, Mozzanica, Pianengo, Ricengo.
