= Antegnate =

- Comune
- Comune di Antegnate
- Church of San Michele Arcangelo

- Coat of arms

- Location of Antegnate in Italy Antegnate (Lombardy)
- Coordinates: 45°29′N 9°47′E
- Country: Italy
- Region: Lombardy
- Province: Bergamo (BG)

Government
  - Mayor: Andrea Maria Lanzini (lista civica)

Area
  - Total: 9.73 km^{2} (3.76 sq mi)
- Elevation: 112 m (367 ft)

Population (28 February 2017)
  - Total: 3,216
  - Density: 331/km^{2} (856/sq mi)
- Demonym: Antegnatesi
- Time zone: UTC+1 (CET)
  - Summer (DST): UTC+2 (CEST)
- Postal code: 24051
- Dialing code: 0363
- Patron saint: Saint Michael the Archangel
- Saint day: 29 September
- Website: Official website

Antegnate (Bergamasque: Antegnàt) is a comune (municipality) in the Province of Bergamo in the Italian region of Lombardy, located about 50 kilometres (31 mi) east of Milan and about 25 kilometres (16 mi) southeast of Bergamo.

Antegnate borders the following municipalities: Barbata, Calcio, Covo, Fontanella.
