= Barbata =

- Comune
- Comune di Barbata
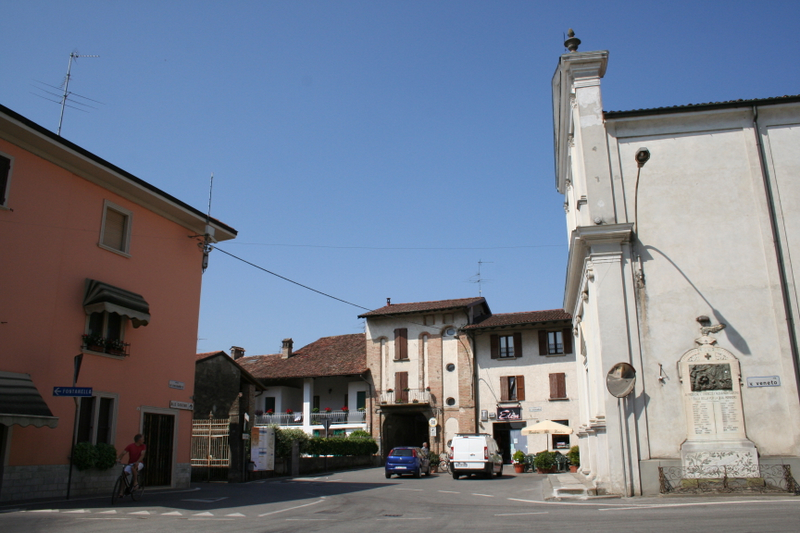
- Municipal square

- Coat of arms

- Location within Italy Location within Lombardy
- Coordinates: 45°28′N 9°46′E
- Country: Italy
- Region: Lombardy
- Province: Bergamo (BG)

Government
  - Mayor: Vincenzo Trapattoni

Area
  - Total: 7.98 km^{2} (3.08 sq mi)
- Elevation: 105 m (344 ft)

Population (30 April 2017)
  - Total: 703
  - Density: 88.1/km^{2} (228/sq mi)
- Demonym: Barbatesi
- Time zone: UTC+1 (CET)
  - Summer (DST): UTC+2 (CEST)
- Postal code: 24040
- Dialing code: 0363
- Website: Official website

Barbata (Bergamasque: Barbàda) is a comune (municipality) in the Province of Bergamo in the Italian region of Lombardy, located about 50 kilometres (31 mi) east of Milan and about 25 kilometres (16 mi) southeast of Bergamo.

Barbata borders the following municipalities: Antegnate, Camisano, Casaletto di Sopra, Covo, Fontanella, Isso.
