= Casale Cremasco-Vidolasco =

- Comune
- Comune di Casale Cremasco-Vidolasco
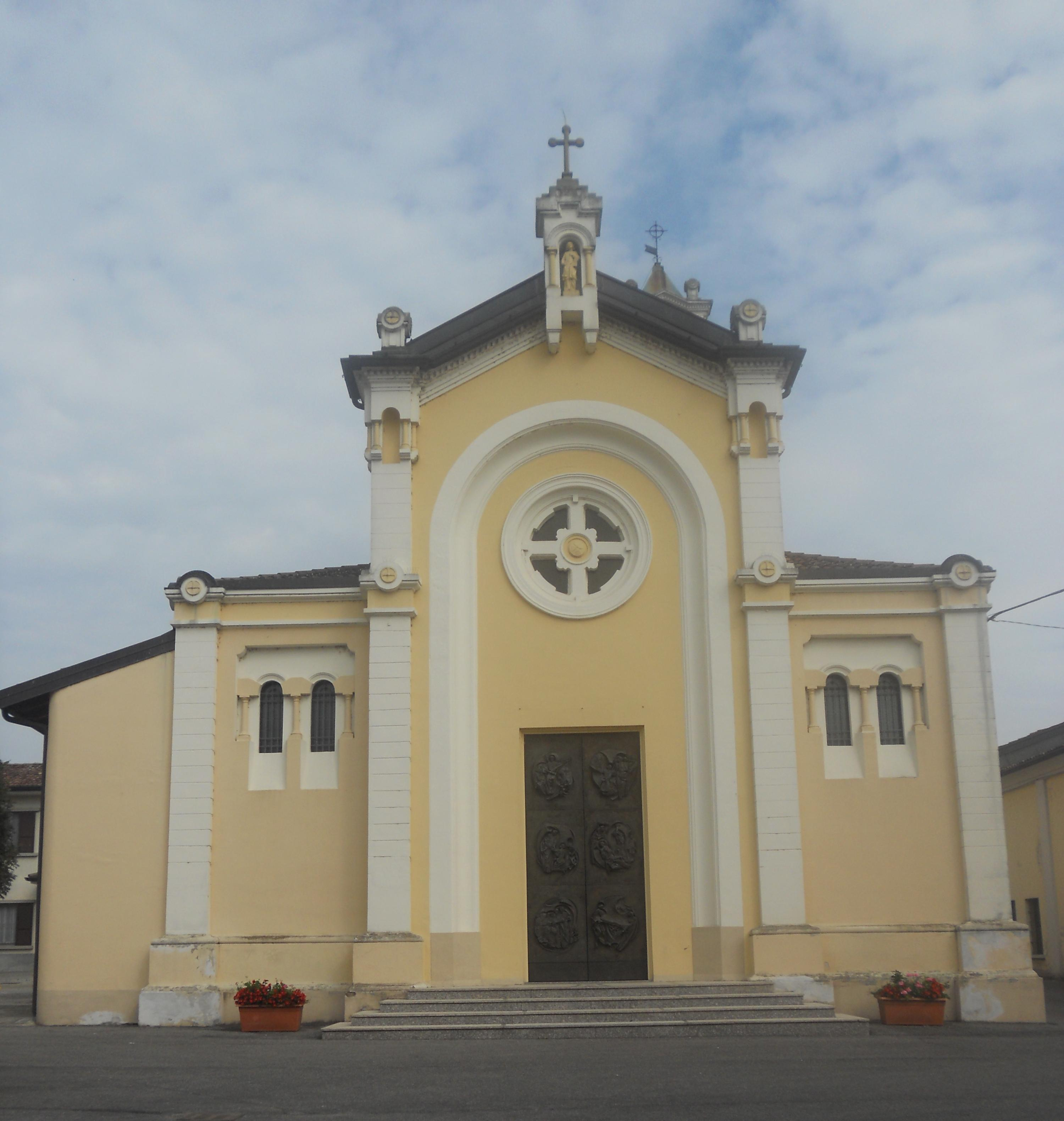

- Location within Italy Location within Lombardy
- Coordinates: 45°26′N 9°43′E
- Country: Italy
- Region: Lombardy
- Province: Cremona (CR)
- Frazioni: Casale Cremasco, Vidolasco

Government
  - Mayor: Antonio Giuseppe Grassi

Area
  - Total: 9.19 km^{2} (3.55 sq mi)
- Elevation: 92 m (302 ft)

Population (28 February 2017)
  - Total: 1,870
  - Density: 203/km^{2} (527/sq mi)
- Demonym: Casalesi or Casalaschi
- Time zone: UTC+1 (CET)
  - Summer (DST): UTC+2 (CEST)
- Postal code: 26010
- Dialing code: 0373
- Patron saint: Saint Stephen
- Saint day: 26 December
- Website: Official website

Casale Cremasco-Vidolasco (Cremasco: Casal-Vidulasch) is a comune (municipality) in the Province of Cremona in the Italian region Lombardy, located about 45 kilometres (28 mi) east of Milan and about 40 kilometres (25 mi) northwest of Cremona. It was formed in 1935 through the merger of the two communities of Casale Cremasco and Vidolasco.

Casale Cremasco-Vidolasco borders the municipalities of Camisano, Castel Gabbiano, Pianengo, Ricengo, and Sergnano.
