= Silvio Savelli =

Italian condottiero

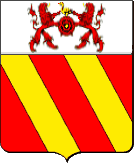
Savelli family coat of arms

Silvio Savelli (died 1515) was an Italian condottiero. A member of the Savelli family of Rome, he was the brother of Troiano Savelli.

After the initial baronial struggles against the Colonna and the Orsini, he was hired by the Republic of Florence, taking part in the war for Pisa in 1503–1505. Later he was under the Holy Roman Empire's banner, and participated in the Battle of Novara.

In 1513 Massimiliano Sforza, Duke of Milan, entrusted him with a force of 2,700 infantry and 500 horses to capture Bergamo, which was held by the Venetians, and Savelli defeated Renzo da Ceri there. Savelli then linked with the Spanish army of Prospero Colonna and together besieged Crema, but before they could take the city, Renzo attacked the Milanese camp in Ombriano at night and forced them to retire, with Savelli being wounded.
After this defeat, Bergamo fell again to Venice. Colonna and Savelli later recaptured Bergamo and defeated Renzo, so Savelli was able to regain the city and obtained the title of commander-in-chief of the Milanese infantry.

In 1515 he is mentioned for the last time, at the defence of Alessandria.
