= Cremosano =

Cremosano Cremusà (Lombard)
- Comune
- Comune di Cremosano
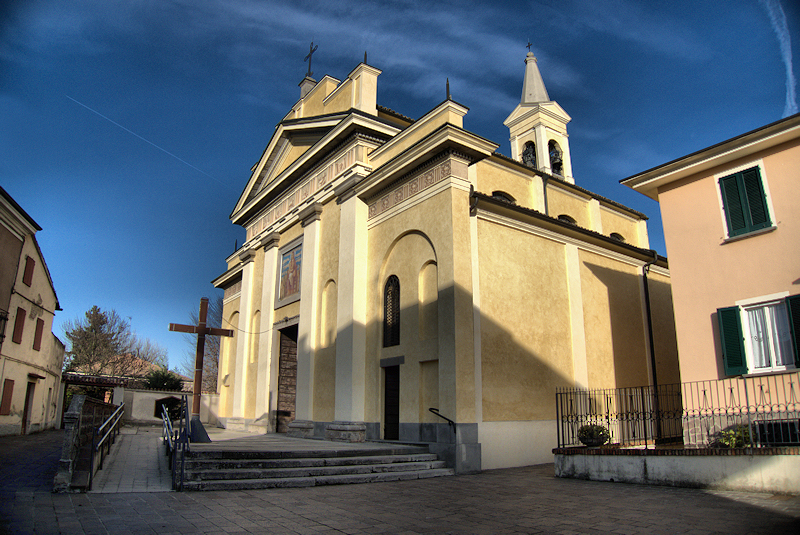
- Parish church of Santa Maria Maddalena.

- Location within Italy Location within Lombardy
- Coordinates: 45°24′N 9°38′E
- Country: Italy
- Region: Lombardy
- Province: Cremona (CR)

Government
  - Mayor: Raffaele Perrino

Area
  - Total: 5.76 km^{2} (2.22 sq mi)
- Elevation: 82 m (269 ft)

Population (30 June 2017)
  - Total: 1,773
  - Density: 308/km^{2} (797/sq mi)
- Demonym: Cremosanesi
- Time zone: UTC+1 (CET)
  - Summer (DST): UTC+2 (CEST)
- Postal code: 26010
- Dialing code: 0373

Cremosano (Cremish: Cremusà) is a comune (municipality) in the Province of Cremona in the Italian region Lombardy, located about 35 kilometres (22 mi) east of Milan and about 45 kilometres (28 mi) northwest of Cremona.

Cremosano borders the following municipalities: Campagnola Cremasca, Casaletto Vaprio, Crema, Trescore Cremasco.
