= Monte Cremasco =

- Comune
- Comune di Monte Cremasco
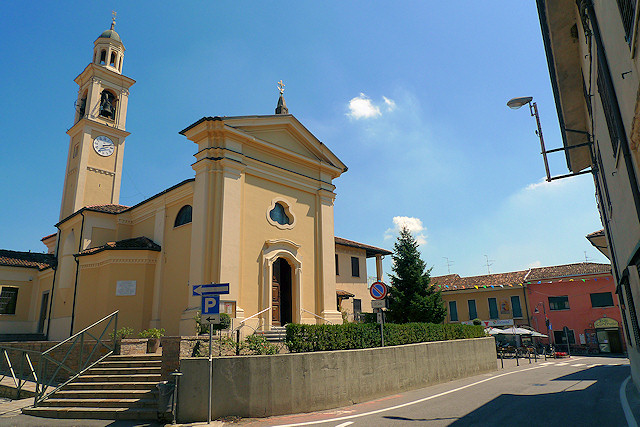

- Location within Italy Location within Lombardy
- Coordinates: 45°23′N 9°34′E
- Country: Italy
- Region: Lombardy
- Province: Cremona (CR)

Government
  - Mayor: Giuseppe Lupo Stanghellini

Area
  - Total: 2.3 km^{2} (0.89 sq mi)
- Elevation: 84 m (276 ft)

Population (30 November 2017)
  - Total: 2,325
  - Density: 1,000/km^{2} (2,600/sq mi)
- Demonym: Muccesi
- Time zone: UTC+1 (CET)
  - Summer (DST): UTC+2 (CEST)
- Postal code: 26010
- Dialing code: 0373
- Website: Official website

Monte Cremasco (Cremish: Mucc) is a comune (municipality) in the Province of Cremona in the Italian region Lombardy, located about 35 kilometres (22 mi) southeast of Milan and about 45 kilometres (28 mi) northwest of Cremona.

Monte Cremasco borders the following municipalities: Crespiatica, Dovera, Palazzo Pignano, Pandino, Vaiano Cremasco.
