= Credera Rubbiano =

Credera Rubbiano Credéra Rübià (Lombard)
- Comune
- Comune di Credera Rubbiano
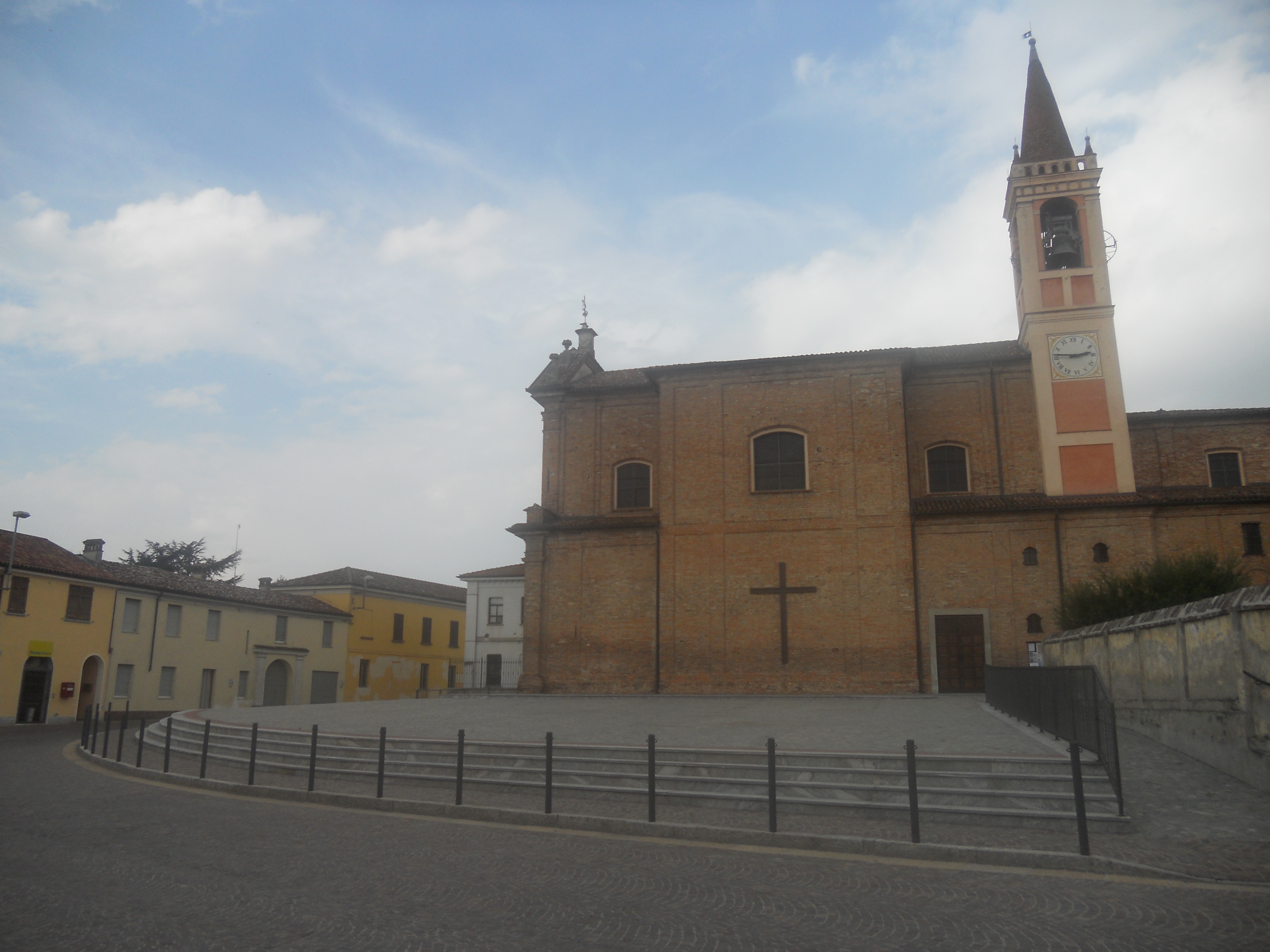
- A square in Credera Rubbiano.

- Location within Italy Location within Lombardy
- Coordinates: 45°18′N 9°40′E
- Country: Italy
- Region: Lombardy
- Province: Cremona (CR)

Government
  - Mayor: Matteo Guerini Rocco

Area
  - Total: 14.4 km^{2} (5.6 sq mi)
- Elevation: 69 m (226 ft)

Population (30 June 2017)
  - Total: 1,605
  - Density: 111/km^{2} (289/sq mi)
- Demonym: Crederesi
- Time zone: UTC+1 (CET)
  - Summer (DST): UTC+2 (CEST)
- Postal code: 26010
- Dialing code: 0373
- Website: Official website

Credera Rubbiano (Cremasco: Credéra Rübià) is a comune (municipality) in the Province of Cremona in the Italian region Lombardy, located about 45 kilometres (28 mi) southeast of Milan and about 35 kilometres (22 mi) northwest of Cremona. It was created in 1928 through the merger of the former communes of Credera and Rubbiano.

Credera Rubbiano borders the following municipalities: Capergnanica, Casaletto Ceredano, Cavenago d'Adda, Moscazzano, Ripalta Cremasca, Turano Lodigiano.
