= Covo =

- Comune
- Comune di Covo
- Church

- Location within Italy Location within Lombardy
- Coordinates: 45°30′N 9°46′E
- Country: Italy
- Region: Lombardy
- Province: Province of Bergamo (BG)

Government
  - Mayor: Andrea Capelletti

Area
  - Total: 12.7 km^{2} (4.9 sq mi)
- Elevation: 115 m (377 ft)

Population (Dec. 2021)
  - Total: 4,218
  - Density: 332/km^{2} (860/sq mi)
- Demonym: Covesi
- Time zone: UTC+1 (CET)
  - Summer (DST): UTC+2 (CEST)
- Postal code: 24050
- Dialing code: 0363

Covo (Bergamasque: Cóf) is a comune (municipality) in the Province of Bergamo in the Italian region of Lombardy, located about 45 kilometres (28 mi) east of Milan and about 25 kilometres (16 mi) southeast of Bergamo. As of 31 December 2021, it had a population of 4,218 and an area of 12.7 square kilometres (4.9 mi^{2}).

Covo borders the following municipalities : Antegnate, Barbata, Calcio, Cortenuova, Fara Olivana con Sola, Isso, Romano di Lombardia.

== Demographic evolution ==
Historical population

Year	Pop.	±%
1861	2,332	—
1871	2,490	+6.8%
1881	2,541	+2.0%
1901	2,697	+6.1%
1911	2,883	+6.9%

Year	Pop.	±%
1921	2,964	+2.8%
1931	2,878	−2.9%
1936	2,848	−1.0%
1951	2,930	+2.9%
1961	2,556	−12.8%

Year	Pop.	±%
1971	2,295	−10.2%
1981	2,663	+16.0%
1991	2,902	+9.0%
2001	3,154	+8.7%

Source: Data from ISTAT
