= Renzo da Ceri =

Italian condottiero

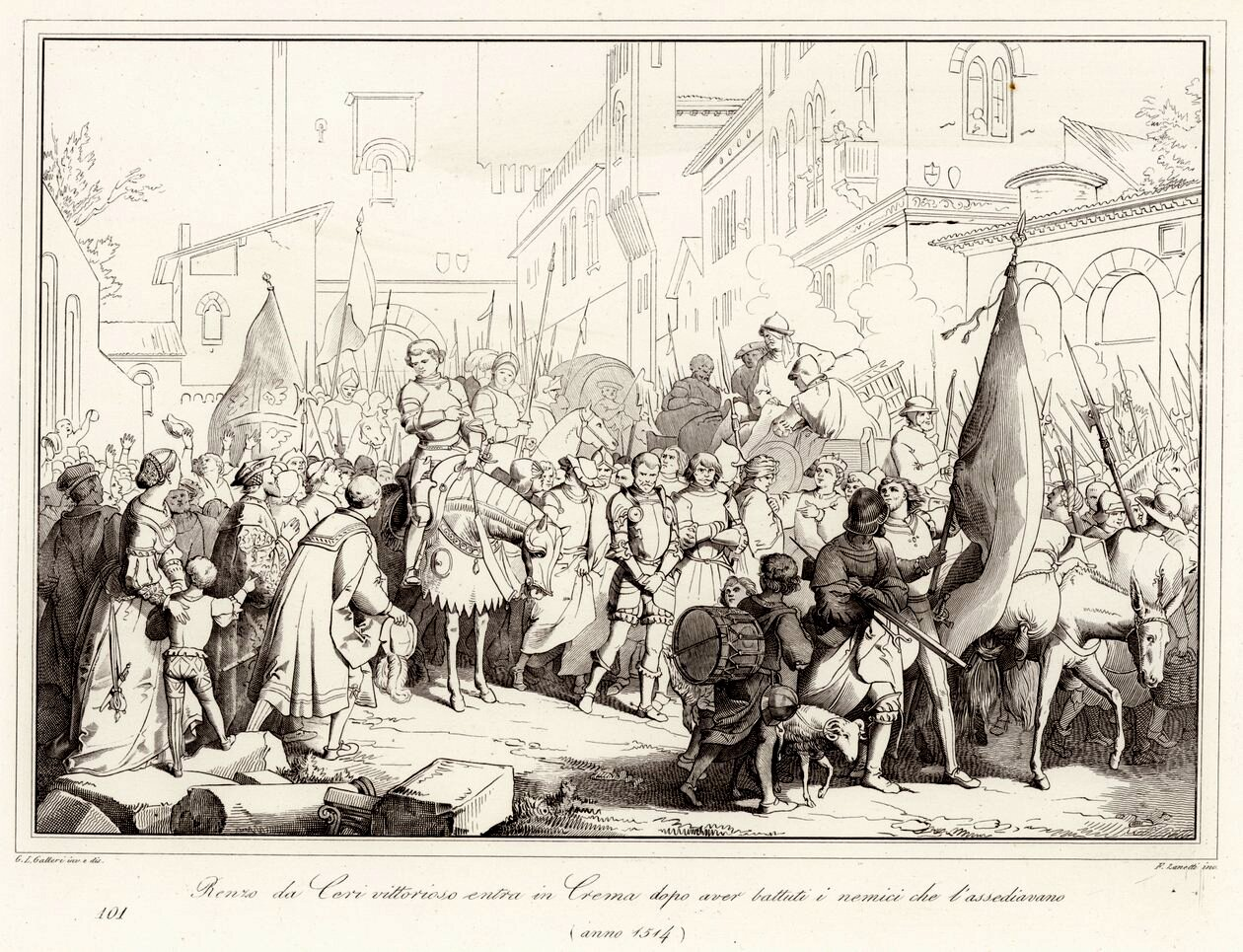
Renzo da Ceri enters Crema in 1514

Renzo da Ceri, true name Lorenzo dell'Anguillara (1475 or 1476 – January 1536) was an Italian condottiero. He fought during the Italian Wars under the Great Captain before joining the armies of the Papal States and the Republic of Venice.

== Biography ==
Born in Ceri, a small village in Lazio (now part of Cerveteri), he was the son of Giovanni degli Anguillara, from the Anguillara family.

He fought for the Orsini family against the Papal States and Cesare Borgia, allying with Bartolomeo d'Alviano. In 1503 they were hired by Spain and took part to the Battle of Garigliano of that year under Gonzalo Fernández de Córdoba, obtaining a crushing victory over the French.

In 1505 he and Alviano parted ways over a disagreement. Two years later Renzo entered the service of Julius II, but in 1509 changed his loyalties to the Republic of Venice.

During the siege of Crema in 1514, he defended the city against Silvio Savelli and another former liutenant of Córdoba, Prospero Colonna. Deceiving Colonna, Renzo routed Savelli, forcing them to withdraw. In November of the same year, with the arrival of Viceroy Ramón de Cardona, Ceri defended Bergamo against Savelli and Colonna again, but this time he was forced to capitulate.

In 1523 he attacked Rubiera and Reggio Emilia.

He led Clement VII's troops in his feudal war against the Colonna family and was present at the Sack of Rome (1527).

Renzo da Ceri died following a fall from his horse in 1536.
