= Campagnola Cremasca =

- Comune
- Comune di Campagnola Cremasca
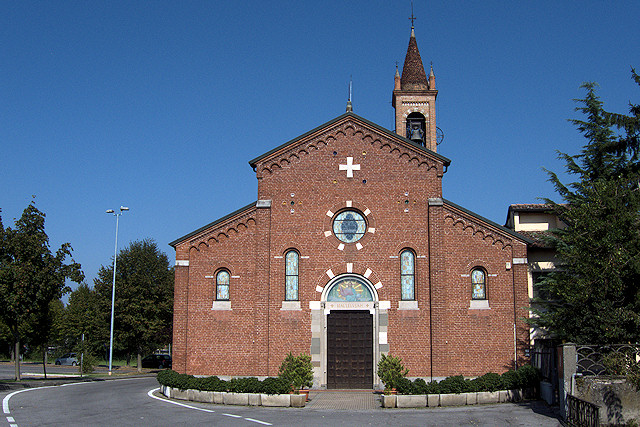
- Church of San Pancrazio.

- Location within Italy Location within Lombardy
- Coordinates: 45°24′N 9°40′E
- Country: Italy
- Region: Lombardy
- Province: Cremona (CR)

Government
  - Mayor: Agostino Guerini Rocco

Area
  - Total: 4.6 km^{2} (1.8 sq mi)
- Elevation: 81 m (266 ft)

Population (28 February 2017)
  - Total: 684
  - Density: 150/km^{2} (390/sq mi)
- Demonym: Campagnolesi
- Time zone: UTC+1 (CET)
  - Summer (DST): UTC+2 (CEST)
- Postal code: 26013
- Dialing code: 0373
- Website: Official website

Campagnola Cremasca (Cremish: Campagnóla) is a comune (municipality) in the Province of Cremona in the Italian region Lombardy, located about 40 kilometres (25 mi) east of Milan and about 40 kilometres (25 mi) northwest of Cremona.

Campagnola Cremasca borders the following municipalities: Capralba, Casaletto Vaprio, Crema, Cremosano, Pianengo, Sergnano.
