= Gerundo Lake =

Lake in Italy

- Location within Lombardy
- Location: Province of Bergamo, Province of Milano, Province of Lodi, Province of Cremona, Lombardy
- Coordinates: 45.410984°N 9.596558°E
- Primary inflows: Adda, Serio, Brembo, Molgora
- Primary outflows: Adda
- Basin countries: Italy
- Surface elevation: 100 m (330 ft)

Gerundo Lake was a lake between the Province of Bergamo, Province of Milano, Province of Lodi and Province of Cremona, in Lombardy, Italy. The Romans originally built drainage channels through it for agricultural purposes. By the 13th century, nothing remained of the lake but fertile plains. It was approximately 50 by 25 kilometers in size and is now completely drained.

== Legend ==
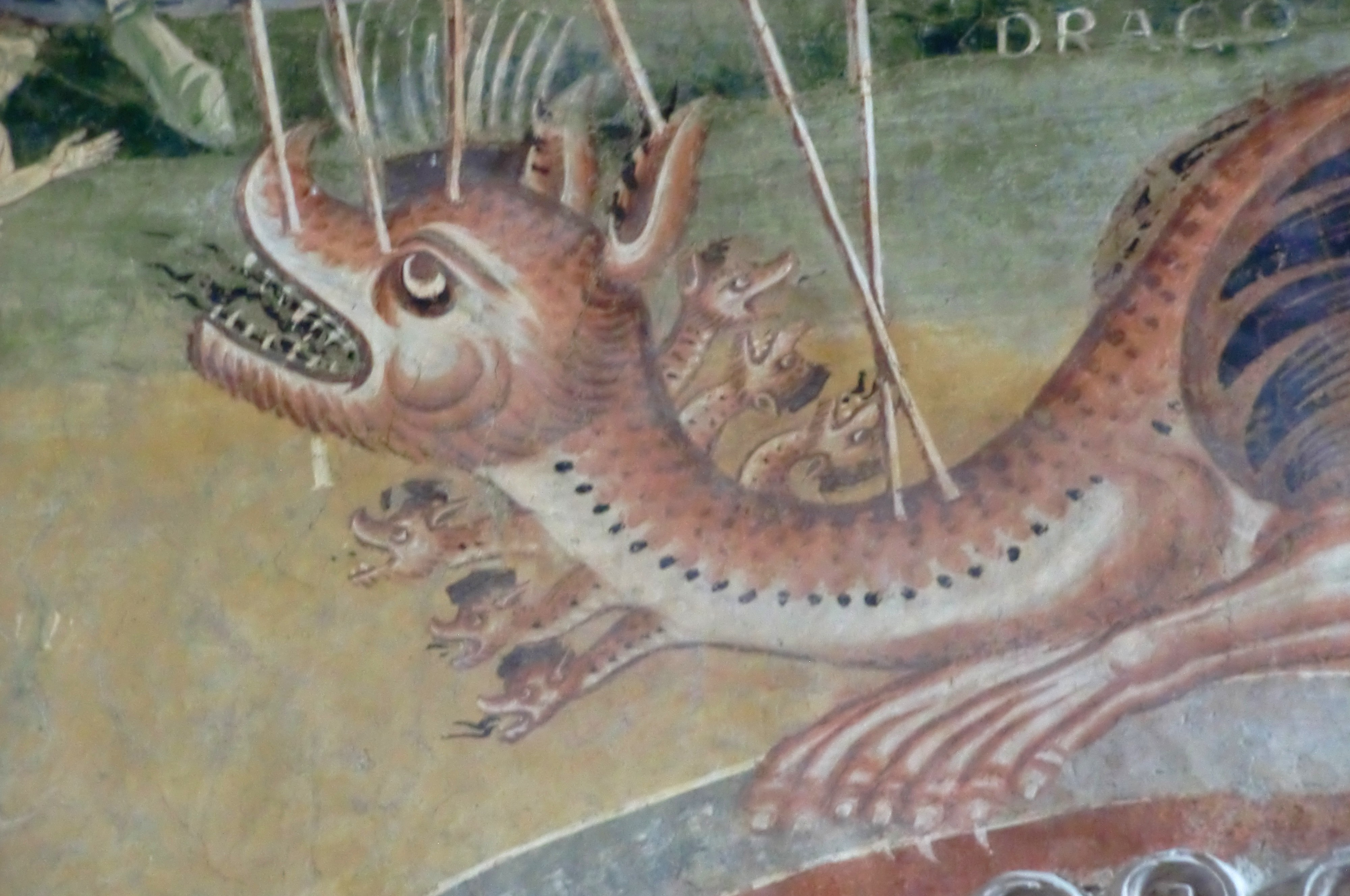
Tarantasio

Gerundo Lake was rumoured to be home to Tarantasio, a great dragon who ruled the lake.
