= Ricengo =

Ricengo Risénch (Lombard)
- Comune
- Comune di Ricengo
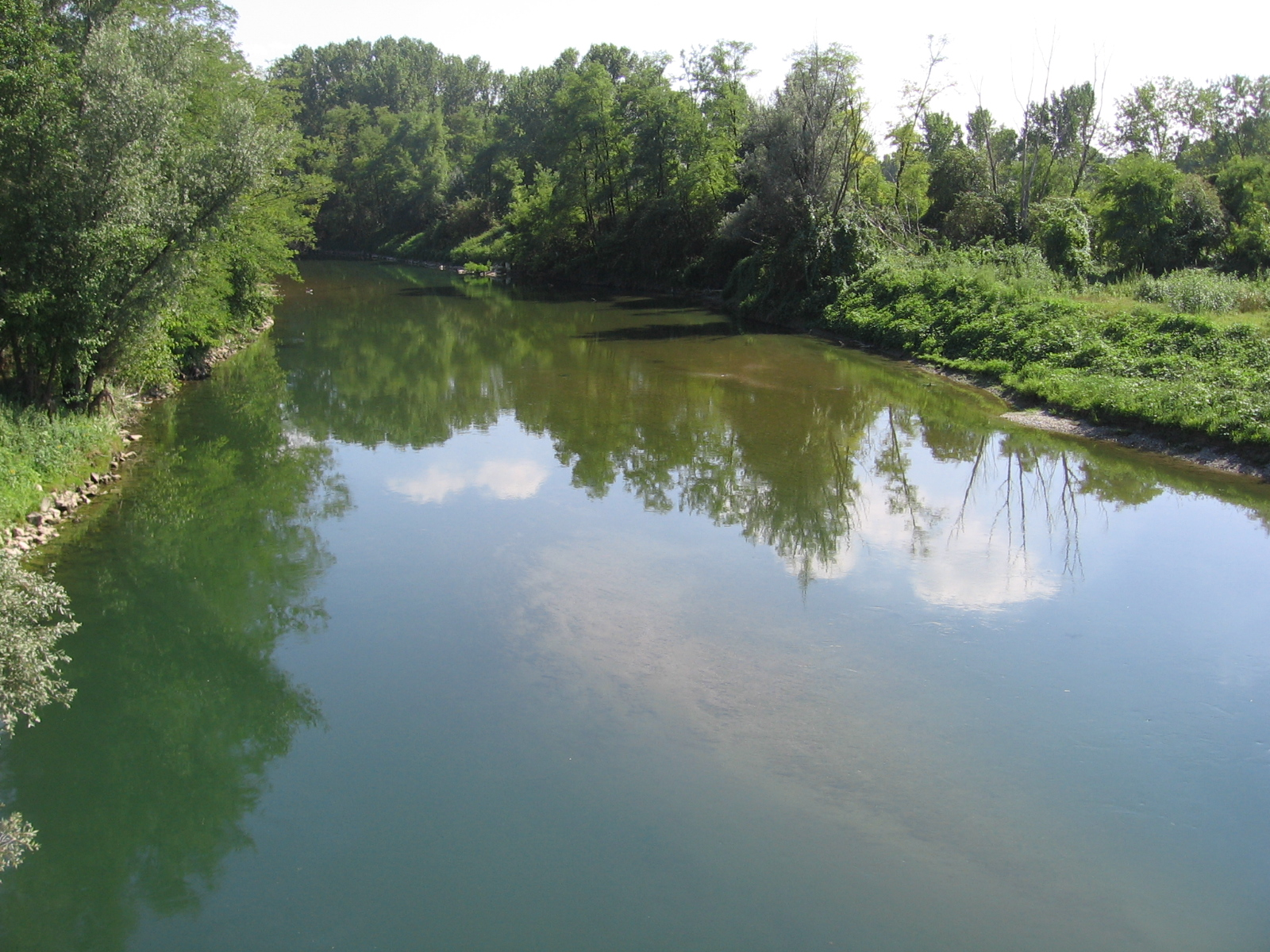
- The Serio river at Ricengo.

- Location within Italy Location within Lombardy
- Coordinates: 45°24′N 9°44′E
- Country: Italy
- Region: Lombardy
- Province: Cremona (CR)

Government
  - Mayor: Ernestino Sassi

Area
  - Total: 12.6 km^{2} (4.9 sq mi)
- Elevation: 86 m (282 ft)

Population (28 February 2017)
  - Total: 1,746
  - Density: 139/km^{2} (359/sq mi)
- Demonym: Ricenghesi
- Time zone: UTC+1 (CET)
  - Summer (DST): UTC+2 (CEST)
- Postal code: 26010
- Dialing code: 0373
- Website: Official website

Ricengo (Cremasco: Risénch) is a comune (municipality) in the Province of Cremona in the Italian region Lombardy, located about 45 kilometres (28 mi) east of Milan and about 40 kilometres (25 mi) northwest of Cremona.

Ricengo borders the following municipalities: Camisano, Casale Cremasco-Vidolasco, Casaletto di Sopra, Crema, Offanengo, Pianengo, Sergnano.
