= Camisano, Lombardy =

Camisano Camisà (Lombard)
- Comune
- Comune di Camisano
- Location within Italy Location within Lombardy
- Coordinates: 45°27′N 9°45′E
- Country: Italy
- Region: Lombardy
- Province: Cremona (CR)

Government
  - Mayor: Adelio Valerani

Area
  - Total: 10.95 km^{2} (4.23 sq mi)
- Elevation: 92 m (302 ft)

Population (28 February 2017)
  - Total: 1,263
  - Density: 115.3/km^{2} (298.7/sq mi)
- Demonym: Camisanesi
- Time zone: UTC+1 (CET)
  - Summer (DST): UTC+2 (CEST)
- Postal code: 26010
- Dialing code: 0373
- Website: Official website

Camisano (Cremasco: Camisà) is a comune (municipality) in the Province of Cremona in the Italian region Lombardy, located about 45 kilometres (28 mi) east of Milan and about 40 kilometres (25 mi) northwest of Cremona.

Camisano borders the following municipalities: Barbata, Casale Cremasco-Vidolasco, Casaletto di Sopra, Castel Gabbiano, Isso, Ricengo.
