= Casaletto Ceredano =

Casaletto Ceredano Casalèt Ceredàn (Lombard)
- Comune
- Comune di Casaletto Ceredano
- Piazza San Pietro.

- Location within Italy Location within Lombardy
- Coordinates: 45°19′N 9°37′E
- Country: Italy
- Region: Lombardy
- Province: Cremona (CR)

Government
  - Mayor: Aldo Casorati

Area
  - Total: 6.5 km^{2} (2.5 sq mi)
- Elevation: 65 m (213 ft)

Population (31 May 2017)
  - Total: 1,169
  - Density: 180/km^{2} (470/sq mi)
- Demonym: Casalettesi
- Time zone: UTC+1 (CET)
  - Summer (DST): UTC+2 (CEST)
- Postal code: 26010
- Dialing code: 0373
- Website: Official website

Casaletto Ceredano (Cremasco: Casalèt Ceredàn) is a comune (municipality) in the Province of Cremona in the Italian region Lombardy, located about 40 kilometres (25 mi) southeast of Milan and about 40 kilometres (25 mi) northwest of Cremona.

Casaletto Ceredano borders the following municipalities: Abbadia Cerreto, Capergnanica, Cavenago d'Adda, Chieve, Credera Rubbiano.
