= Pianengo =

Pianengo Pianénch (Lombard)
- Comune
- Comune di Pianengo
- Location within Italy Location within Lombardy
- Coordinates: 45°24′N 9°42′E
- Country: Italy
- Region: Lombardy
- Province: Province of Cremona (CR)

Area
  - Total: 5.9 km^{2} (2.3 sq mi)

Population (Dec. 2004)
  - Total: 2,474
  - Density: 420/km^{2} (1,100/sq mi)
- Time zone: UTC+1 (CET)
  - Summer (DST): UTC+2 (CEST)
- Postal code: 26010
- Dialing code: 0373
- Website: Official website

Pianengo (Cremasco: Pianénch) is a comune (municipality) in the Province of Cremona in the Italian region Lombardy, located about 40 kilometres (25 mi) east of Milan and about 40 kilometres (25 mi) northwest of Cremona. As of 31 December 2004, it had a population of 2,474 and an area of 5.9 square kilometres (2.3 mi^{2}).

Pianengo borders the following municipalities: Campagnola Cremasca, Casale Cremasco-Vidolasco, Crema, Ricengo, Sergnano.

== Demographic evolution ==
Historical population

Year	Pop.	±%
1861	853	—
1871	878	+2.9%
1881	919	+4.7%
1901	1,066	+16.0%
1911	1,126	+5.6%

Year	Pop.	±%
1921	1,140	+1.2%
1931	1,248	+9.5%
1936	1,209	−3.1%
1951	1,300	+7.5%
1961	1,238	−4.8%

Year	Pop.	±%
1971	1,373	+10.9%
1981	1,625	+18.4%
1991	1,941	+19.4%
2001	2,370	+22.1%

Source: Data from ISTAT
