= Capergnanica =

Capergnanica Caergnàniga (Lombard)
- Comune
- Comune di Capergnanica
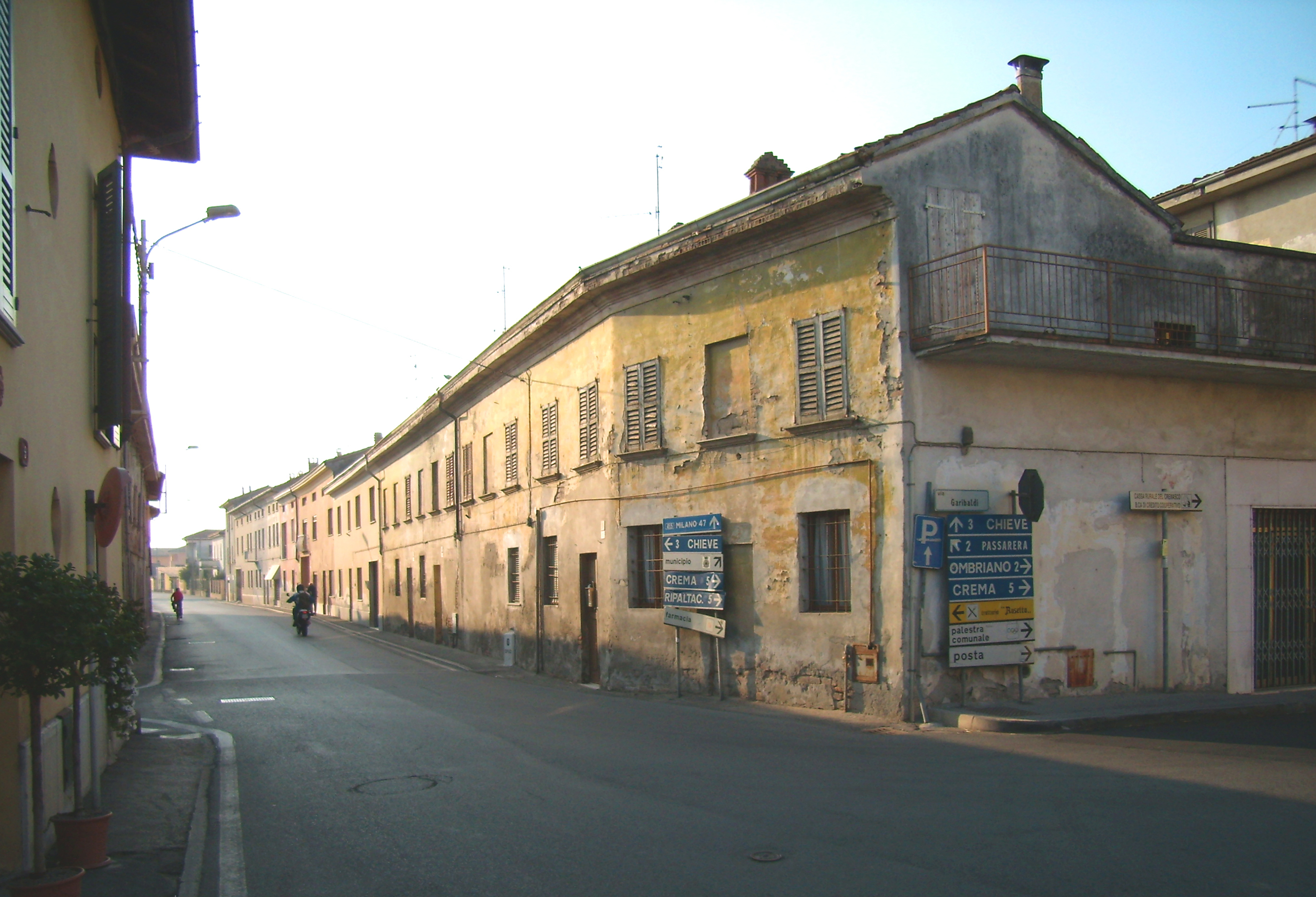

- Location within Italy Location within Lombardy
- Coordinates: 45°20′N 9°39′E
- Country: Italy
- Region: Lombardy
- Province: Cremona (CR)
- Frazioni: Passarera

Government
  - Mayor: Alex Severgnini

Area
  - Total: 6.8 km^{2} (2.6 sq mi)
- Elevation: 77 m (253 ft)

Population (31 May 2017)
  - Total: 2,147
  - Density: 320/km^{2} (820/sq mi)
- Demonym: Capergnanichesi
- Time zone: UTC+1 (CET)
  - Summer (DST): UTC+2 (CEST)
- Postal code: 26010
- Dialing code: 0373
- Website: Official website

Capergnanica (Cremasco: Caergnàniga) is a comune (municipality) in the Province of Cremona in the Italian region Lombardy, located about 45 kilometres (28 mi) southeast of Milan, about 45 kilometres (28 mi) south of Bergamo and about 40 kilometres (25 mi) northwest of Cremona.

The municipality of Capergnanica contains the frazione (subdivision) Passarera.

Capergnanica borders the following municipalities: Casaletto Ceredano, Chieve, Credera Rubbiano, Crema, Ripalta Cremasca.
