= Cremish dialect =

Eastern dialect of Lombard spoken in the Cremasque Territory

Cremish
- Cremasque
- cremàsch
- Native to: Italy
- Region: Cremasque Territory
- Ethnicity: Cremasque
- Language family: Indo-European: Italic; Latino-Faliscan; Latin; Romance; Italo-Western; Western Romance; Gallo-Iberian; Gallo-Romance; Gallo-Italic; Lombard–Piedmontese?; Lombard; Eastern Lombard; Cremish
- Early forms: Old Latin: Vulgar Latin; Proto-Romance; Old Gallo-Romance; Old Lombard
- Writing system: Latin

Language codes
- ISO 639-3: –
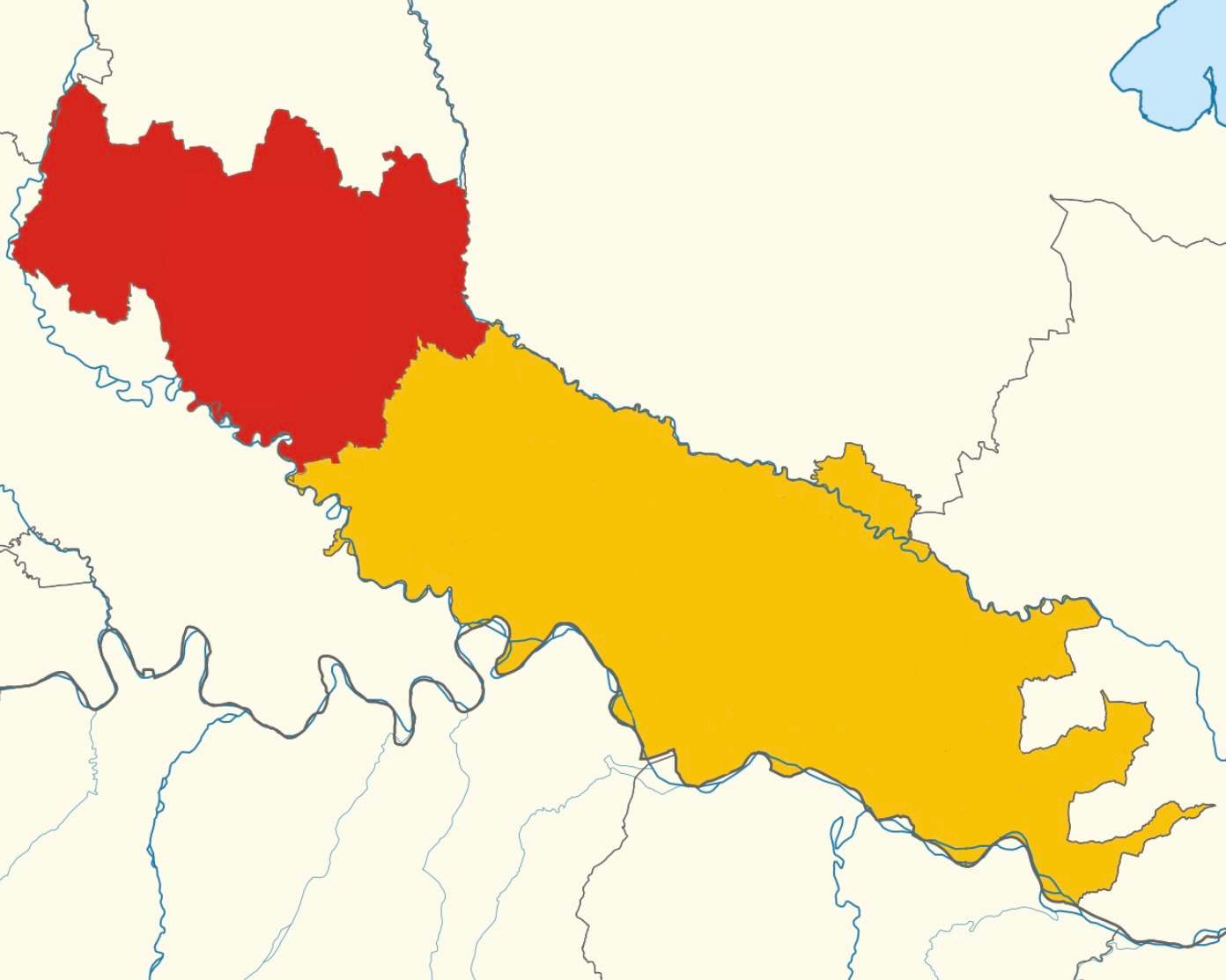
- Cities in which Cremish is spoken

Cremish or Cremasque, (Cremish Lombard: cremàsch) is an Eastern Lombard dialect spoken in the Cremasque Territory of the Province of Cremona, where Cremonese is spoken in the rest of the land except for Soresina and the aforementioned land. The dialect is slowly dying, as younger people don't use it as much anymore.

== Classification ==
Cremish is an Eastern Lombard dialect belonging to the Gallo-Italic branch of the Romance languages. It is more closely related to the Langues d'oïl, Occitan, Catalan, the Rhaeto-Romance languages, and the Iberian Romance languages, than Italian. It is similar to the dialects of Bergamo (Bergamasque) and Brescia (Brescian).

== Distribution ==
The dialect is mostly spoken in the Cremasque Territory, which is the area adjacent to Crema and surroundings. It extends from the area of Rivolta d'Adda to Gombito and Castelleone.

== Orthography ==
The dialect is traditionally written in the Classical Cremish Orthography, which is shown in Bonifacio Samarani's book Vocabulario cremasco-italiano.

=== Rules ===
The following are rules in the Classical Cremish Orthography.

- The vowels a, e, and i have an acute accent when they are long vowels.
- E and o are without accent when they are short and closed /e/ and /o/.
- È and ò make an open sound, short or long /ɛ/ and /ɔ/.
- É and ó are a longer closed sounds /eː/ and /oː/ respectably.
- Ö is the letter of /œ/, like the German können.
- Ü is the written form of /ʏ/ as in German flüsse.

== Literature ==
The Cremish dialect began thriving in literature in the 18th century. A notable poet that wrote in the dialect was Federico Pesadori, who wrote works such as A Crèma, Ai casòt d'ingürie, and L'ucarina.

== Bibliography ==
- Geroldi Luciano, Vocabolario del dialetto di Crema, Edizioni Tipolito Uggè, 2004
- Francesco Piantelli, Folclore Cremasco, ristampa, Arti Grafiche Cremasche, 1985, pag. 422 e seguenti.
- Bonifacio Samarani, Vocabolario cremasco-italiano, 1852
