= Corte Palasio =

Corte Palasio Curt Palasi (Lombard)
- Comune
- Comune di Corte Palasio
- Coat of arms

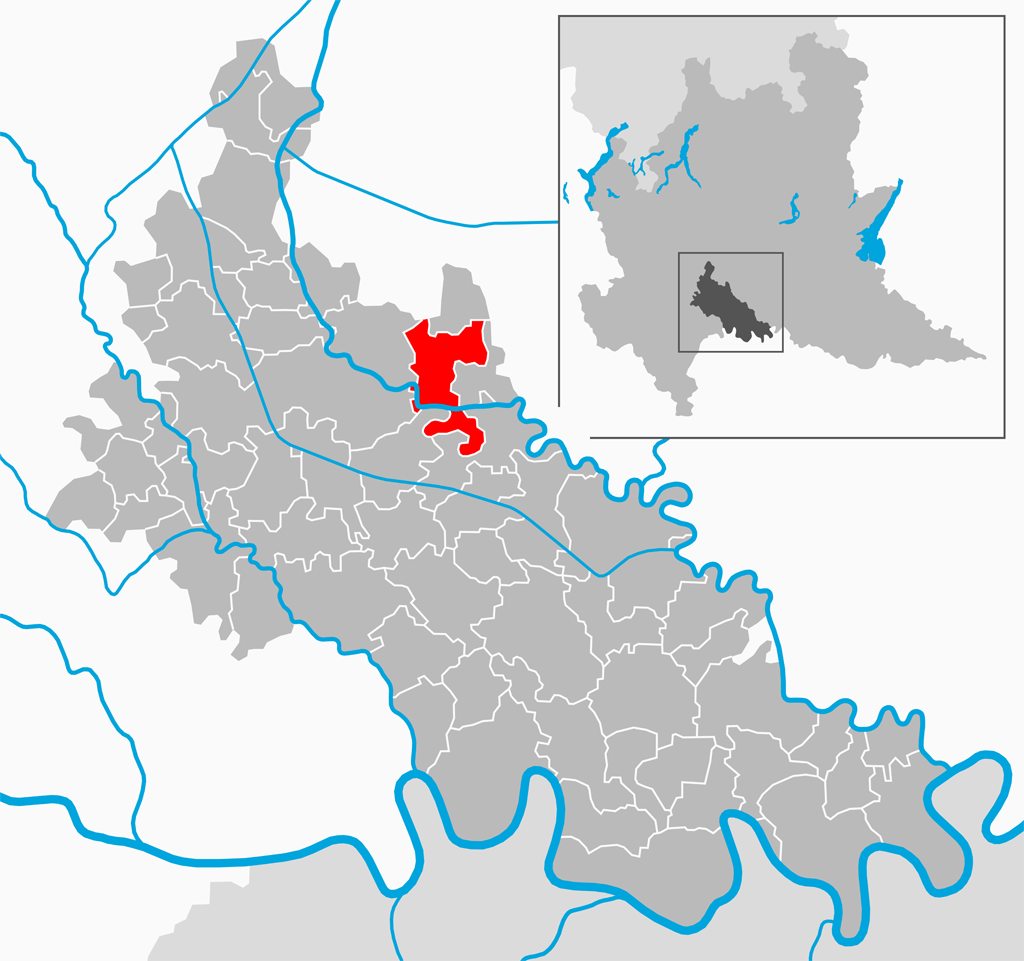

- Location within Italy Location within Lombardy
- Coordinates: 45°18′N 09°35′E
- Country: Italy
- Region: Lombardy
- Province: Lodi (LO)
- Frazioni: Cadilana, Terraverde, Prada, Casellario

Government
  - Mayor: Marco Stabilini

Area
  - Total: 15.68 km^{2} (6.05 sq mi)
- Elevation: 69 m (226 ft)

Population (30 June 2017)
  - Total: 1,546
  - Density: 98.60/km^{2} (255.4/sq mi)
- Demonym: Palasiani
- Time zone: UTC+1 (CET)
  - Summer (DST): UTC+2 (CEST)
- Postal code: 26834
- Dialing code: 0371
- Website: Official website

Corte Palasio (Lodigiano: Curt Palasi) is a town and comune in the province of Lodi, in Lombardy (northern Italy).
