= Castel Gabbiano =

Castel Gabbiano Castèl Gabià (Lombard)
- Comune
- Comune di Castel Gabbiano
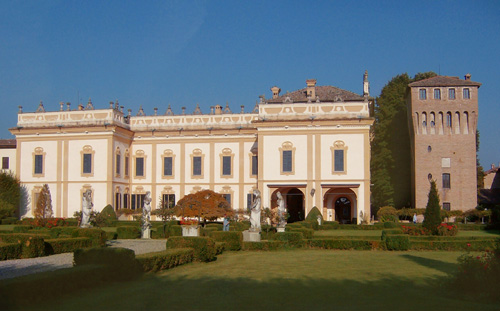
- Villa Grifoni.

- Location within Italy Location within Lombardy
- Coordinates: 45°28′N 9°42′E
- Country: Italy
- Region: Lombardy
- Province: Cremona (CR)

Government
  - Mayor: Filomena Formisano (commissar)

Area
  - Total: 5 km^{2} (1.9 sq mi)
- Elevation: 100 m (330 ft)

Population (28 February 2017)
  - Total: 470
  - Density: 94/km^{2} (240/sq mi)
- Demonym: Cremaschi
- Time zone: UTC+1 (CET)
  - Summer (DST): UTC+2 (CEST)
- Postal code: 26010
- Dialing code: 0373
- Patron saint: St. Alexander
- Saint day: 26 August
- Website: Official website

Castel Gabbiano (Cremasco: Castèl Gabià) is a comune in the north of the Province of Cremona, in Lombardy, northern Italy.
