= Bagnolo Cremasco =

- Comune
- Comune di Bagnolo Cremasco
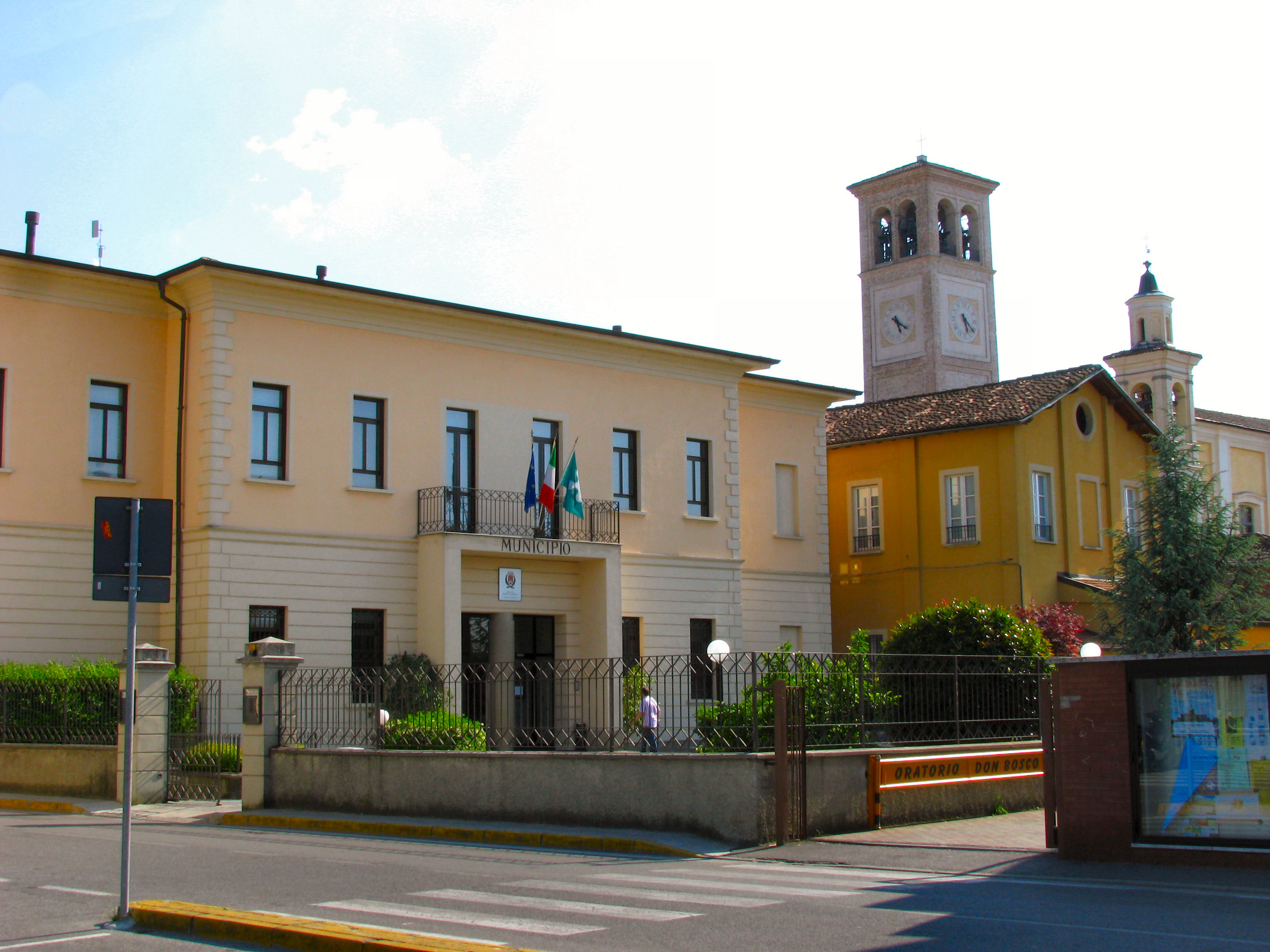
- View of Bagnolo Cremasco

- Coat of arms

- Location within Italy Location within Lombardy
- Coordinates: 45°21′N 09°37′E
- Country: Italy
- Region: Lombardy
- Province: Cremona (CR)
- Frazioni: Gattolino, Moso

Government
  - Mayor: Doriano Aiolfi

Area
  - Total: 10.39 km^{2} (4.01 sq mi)
- Elevation: 82 m (269 ft)

Population (30 April 2017)
  - Total: 4,858
  - Density: 467.6/km^{2} (1,211/sq mi)
- Demonym: Bagnolesi
- Time zone: UTC+1 (CET)
  - Summer (DST): UTC+2 (CEST)
- Postal code: 26010
- Dialing code: 0373
- Patron saint: St. Stephen
- Saint day: Second Sunday in August
- Website: Official website

Bagnolo Cremasco (Cremasco: Bagnól) is a comune in the province of Cremona, in Lombardy, northern Italy.
