= Annicco =

Annicco Nic (Lombard)
- Comune
- Comune di Annicco
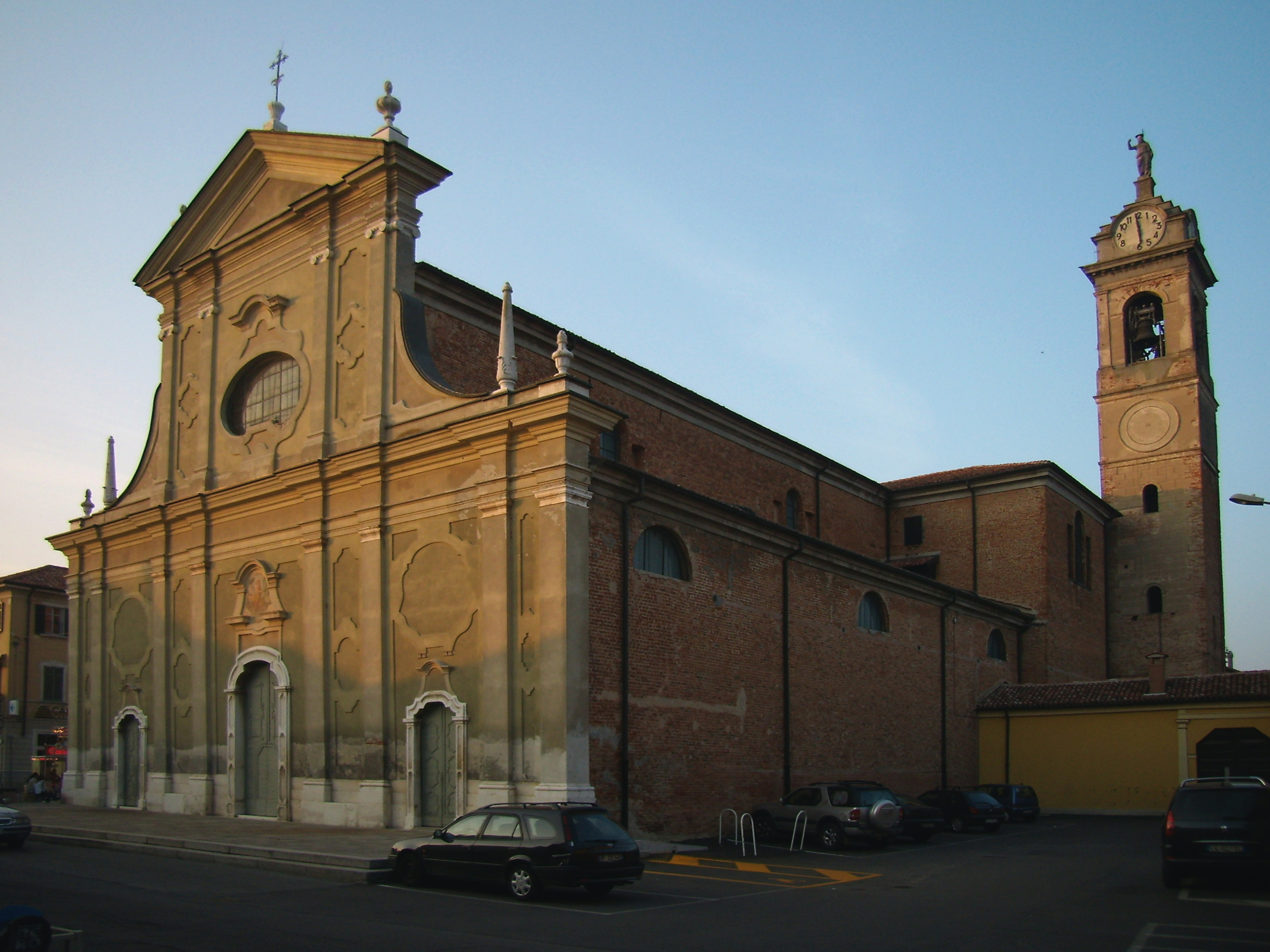
- Church of San Giovanni Battista, Annicco

- Location of Annicco in Italy Annicco (Lombardy)
- Coordinates: 45°15′N 9°53′E
- Country: Italy
- Region: Lombardy
- Province: Cremona (CR)
- Frazioni: Grontorto, Barzaniga

Government
  - Mayor: Maurizio Antonio Fornasari

Area
  - Total: 19.2 km^{2} (7.4 sq mi)
- Elevation: 60 m (200 ft)

Population (28 February 2017)
  - Total: 2,039
  - Density: 106/km^{2} (275/sq mi)
- Demonym: Annicchesi
- Time zone: UTC+1 (CET)
  - Summer (DST): UTC+2 (CEST)
- Postal code: 26021
- Dialing code: 0374
- Website: Official website

Annicco (Annicchese: Nic) is a comune (municipality) in the Province of Cremona in the Italian region Lombardy, located about 60 kilometres (37 mi) southeast of Milan and about 20 kilometres (12 mi) northwest of Cremona.

Annicco borders the following municipalities: Cappella Cantone, Casalmorano, Grumello Cremonese ed Uniti, Paderno Ponchielli, Sesto ed Uniti, Soresina.
