= Castelverde =

- Comune
- Comune di Castelverde
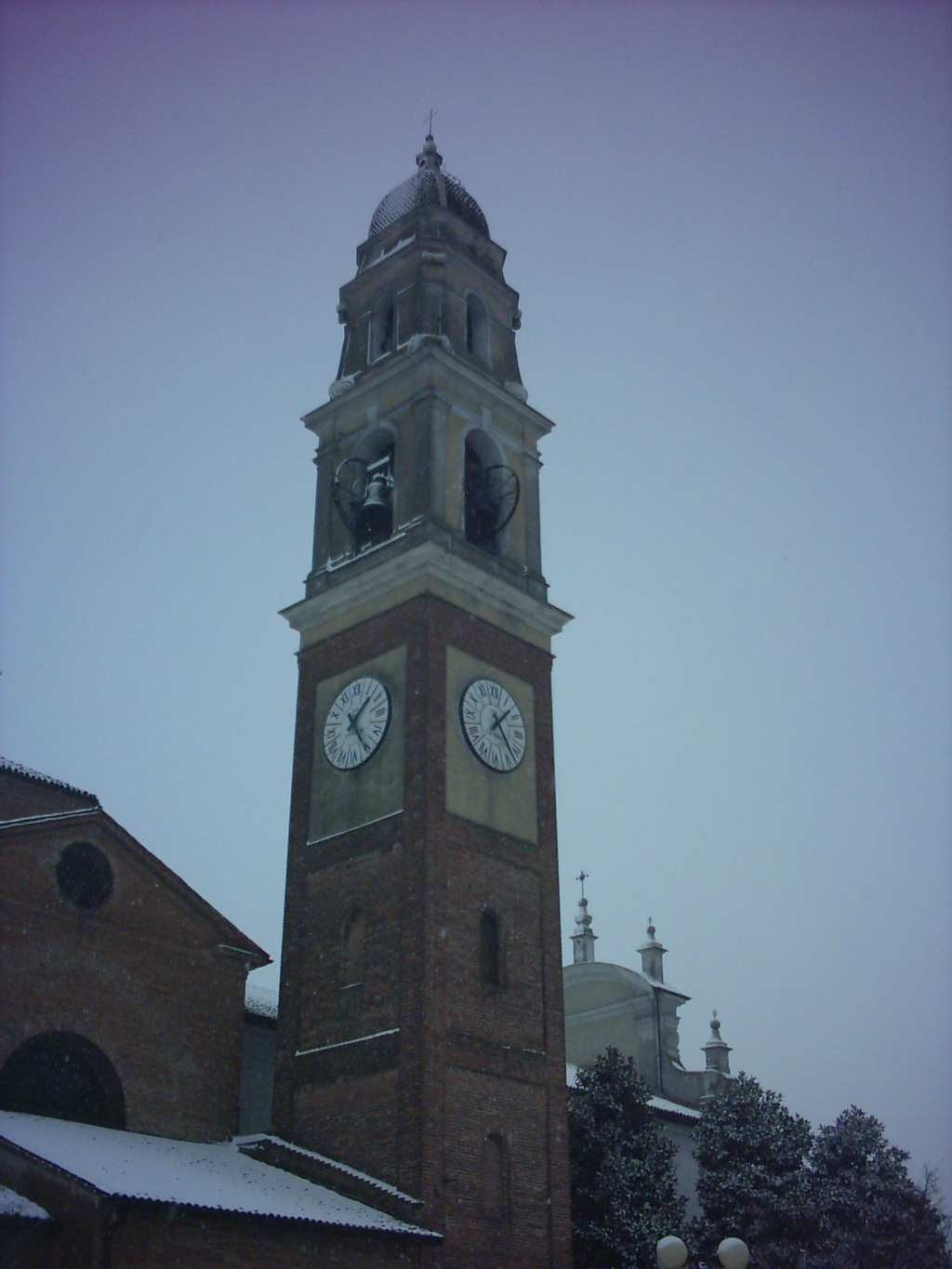
- Bell tower of the church of Sant'Archelao.

- Coat of arms

- Location within Italy Location within Lombardy
- Coordinates: 45°11′N 9°58′E
- Country: Italy
- Region: Lombardy
- Province: Cremona (CR)

Government
  - Mayor: Graziella Locci

Area
  - Total: 30.89 km^{2} (11.93 sq mi)
- Elevation: 52 m (171 ft)

Population (28 February 2017)
  - Total: 5,711
  - Density: 184.9/km^{2} (478.8/sq mi)
- Demonym: Castelverdesi
- Time zone: UTC+1 (CET)
  - Summer (DST): UTC+2 (CEST)
- Postal code: 26022
- Dialing code: 0372
- Patron saint: Archelaus the Deacon

Castelverde (Lombard: Castegnìn) is a comune (municipality) in the Province of Cremona in the Italian region Lombardy, located about 70 kilometres (43 mi) southeast of Milan and about 8 kilometres (5 mi) northwest of Cremona.

Castelverde borders the following municipalities: Casalbuttano ed Uniti, Cremona, Olmeneta, Paderno Ponchielli, Persico Dosimo, Pozzaglio ed Uniti, Sesto ed Uniti.
