= Sesto ed Uniti =

- Comune
- Comune di Sesto ed Uniti
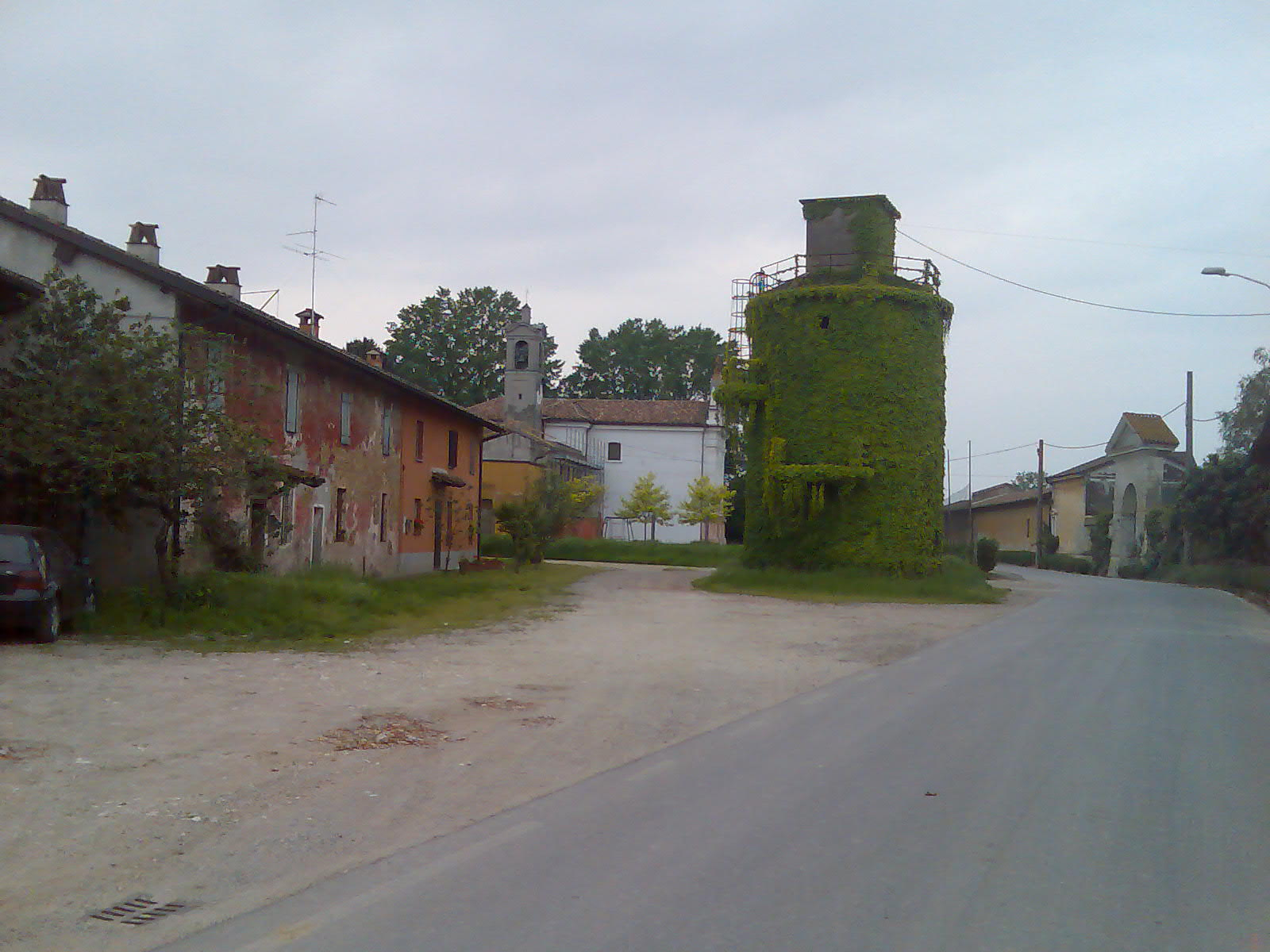

- Coat of arms

- Location within Italy Location within Lombardy
- Coordinates: 45°11′N 9°55′E
- Country: Italy
- Region: Lombardy
- Province: Cremona (CR)
- Frazioni: Casanova del Morbasco, Cortetano, Luignano, Sesto Cremonese (comune capital)

Government
  - Mayor: Carlo Angelo Vezzini

Area
  - Total: 26.5 km^{2} (10.2 sq mi)

Population (Dec. 2004)
  - Total: 2,846
  - Density: 107/km^{2} (278/sq mi)
- Time zone: UTC+1 (CET)
  - Summer (DST): UTC+2 (CEST)
- Postal code: 26028
- Dialing code: 0372

Sesto ed Uniti (Cremonese: Sést) is a comune (municipality) in the Province of Cremona in the Italian region Lombardy, located about 70 kilometres (43 mi) southeast of Milan and about 11 kilometres (7 mi) northwest of Cremona.

Sesto ed Uniti borders the following municipalities: Acquanegra Cremonese, Annicco, Castelverde, Cremona, Grumello Cremonese ed Uniti, Paderno Ponchielli, Spinadesco.

== Notable people ==
- Sergio Cofferati, former mayor of Bologna (2004-2009) and former trade union leader, CGIL (1994-2002). Sergio Cofferati
- Chef Massimo Capra
