= Acquanegra =

Acquanegra may refer to two Italian towns in Lombardy:

- Acquanegra Cremonese, in the province of Cremona
- Acquanegra sul Chiese, in the province of Mantua
