= Grumello =

Grumello is the name of two Italian towns:

- Grumello Cremonese ed Uniti in the province of Cremona
- Grumello del Monte in the province of Bergamo

Grumello may also be:

- Grumello (wine) a type of wine from Valtellina
