= Caselle Landi =

- Comune
- Comune di Caselle Landi
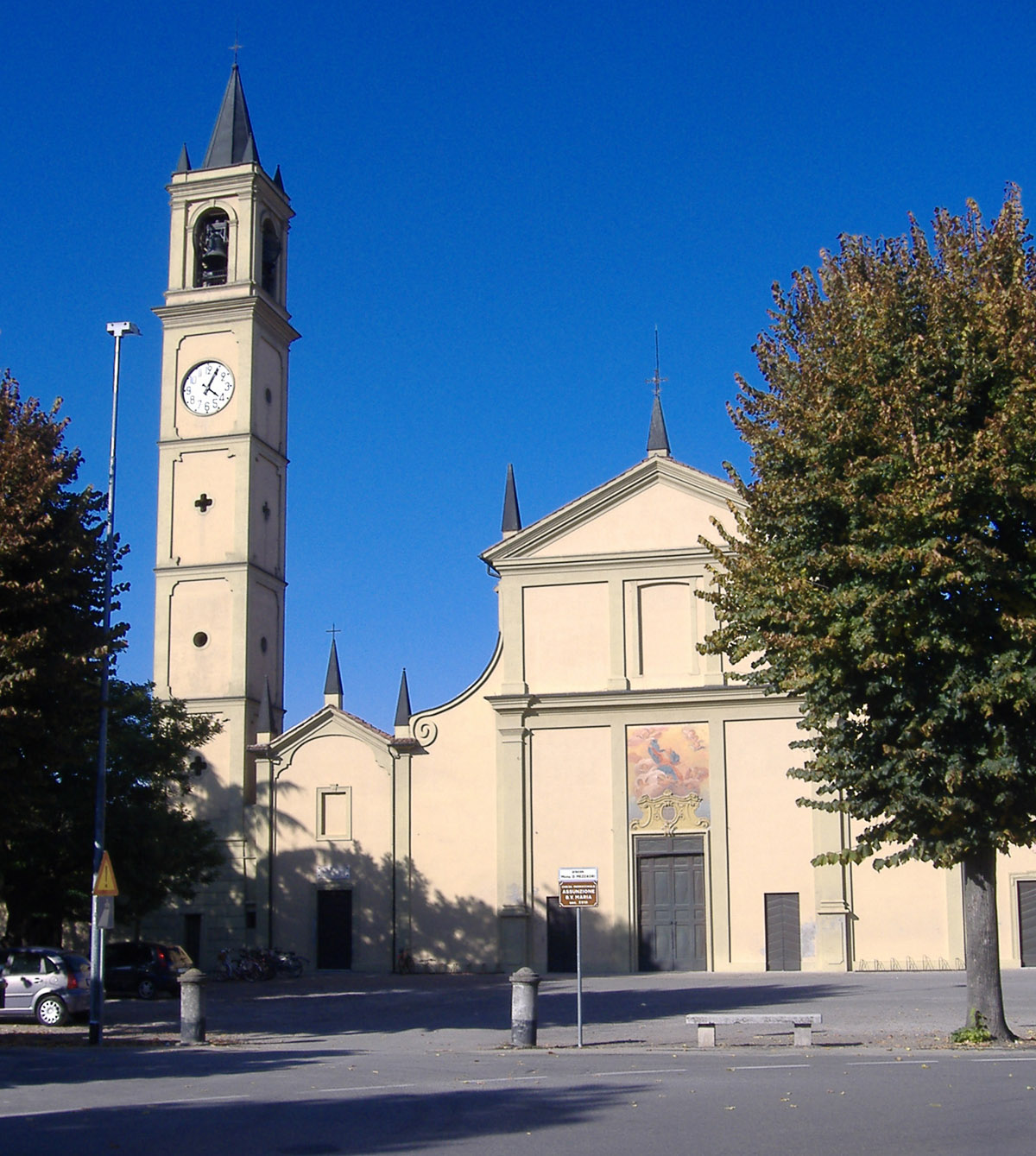
- The parish church of Caselle Landi

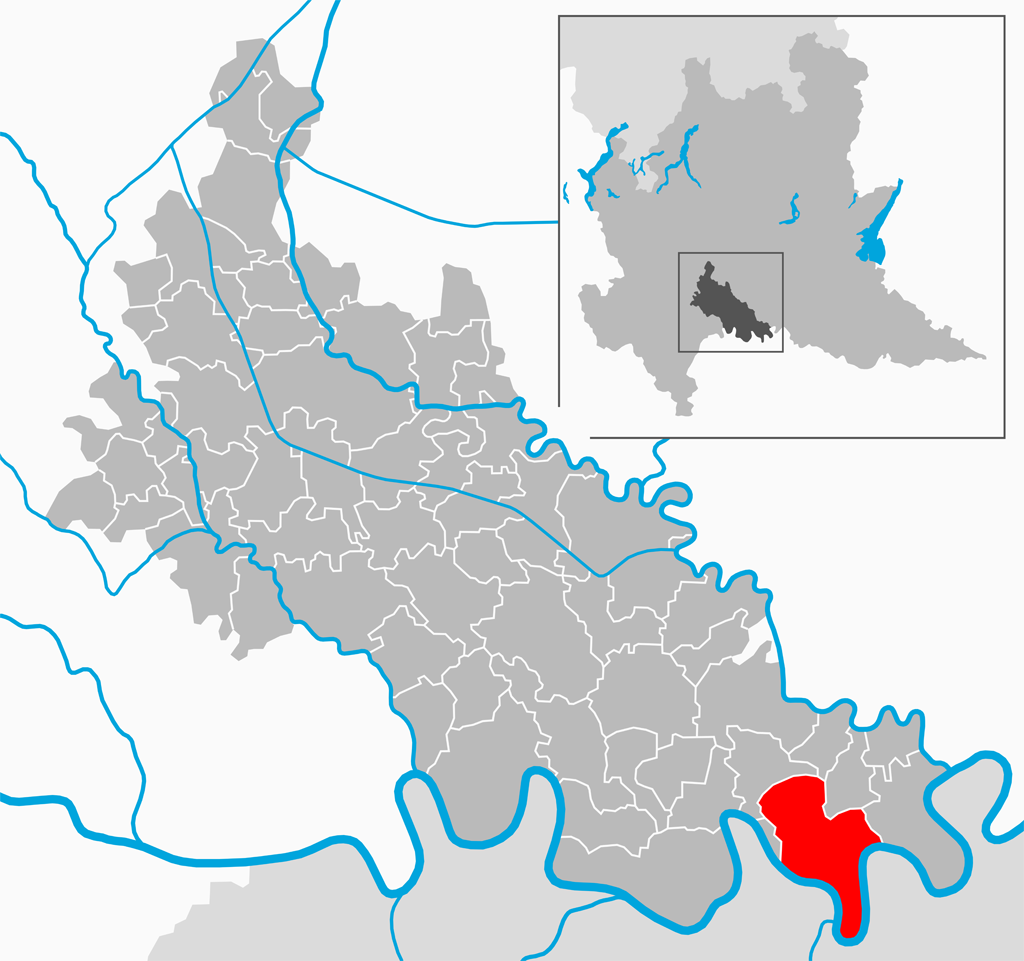

- Location within Italy Location within Lombardy
- Coordinates: 45.103212°N 9.792790°E
- Country: Italy
- Region: Lombardy
- Province: Lodi (LO)

Government
  - Mayor: Piero Luigi Bianchi

Area
  - Total: 26.01 km^{2} (10.04 sq mi)
- Elevation: 44 m (144 ft)

Population (31 May 2017)
  - Total: 1,551
  - Density: 59.63/km^{2} (154.4/sq mi)
- Demonym: Casellesi
- Time zone: UTC+1 (CET)
  - Summer (DST): UTC+2 (CEST)
- Postal code: 26842
- Dialing code: 0377
- ISTAT code: 098011
- Website: Official website

Caselle Landi (Lodigiano: Caséli) is a comune (municipality) in the Province of Lodi in the Italian region Lombardy, located about 70 kilometres (43 mi) southeast of Milan and about 35 kilometres (22 mi) southeast of Lodi.

Caselle Landi borders the following municipalities: Cornovecchio, Meleti, Corno Giovine, Santo Stefano Lodigiano, Castelnuovo Bocca d'Adda, Piacenza, Caorso.

== History ==
The name "Landi" comes from an ancient Italian noble family name: House of Landi. Caselle-Landi was dependent from Piacenza until 1797, when the village came under the administration of the province of Lodi.

=== Punte Alte massacre ===
On April 1, 1945, the Punte Alte farm, inhabited by the Campagnoli family, whose son Silvano, a deserter from the Republican National Guard and partisan of the Val d'Arda division, had returned home for Easter, was surrounded by the Black Brigades, who came from neighboring towns, notably Codogno, under the command of Alessandro Midali.

After a brief exchange of fire, the partisan was found and killed in the barn. His sixteen-year-old brother, Lino, as well as their father, Pietro, and their pregnant mother, Teresa Berselli, were also killed. The sharecropper, Luigi Losi, who had managed to get his children and the Campagnoli's children saved in his carriage, returned to the farm to ask that the livestock be spared; he too was later killed.

== Gallery ==
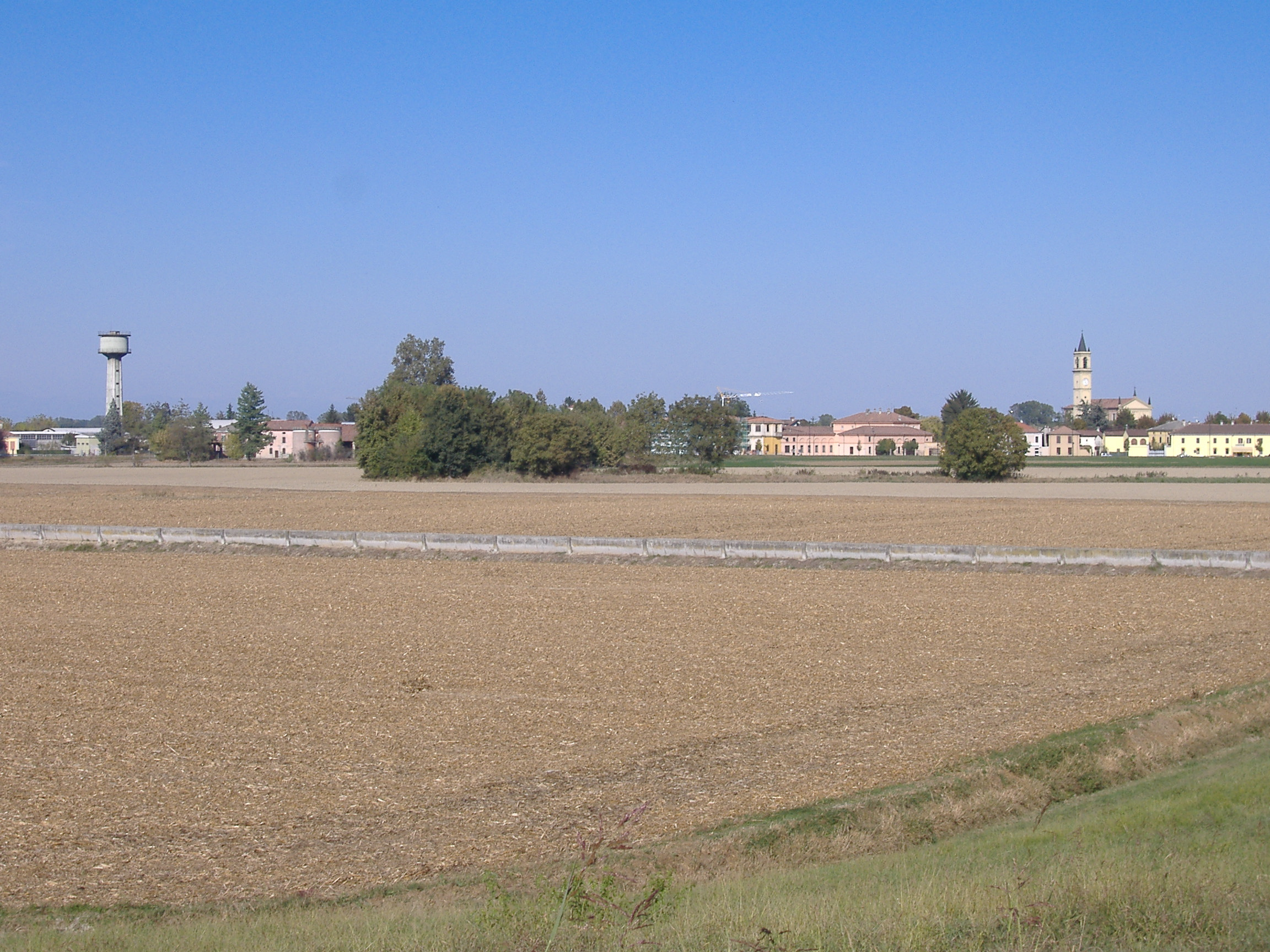
Panorama of Caselle Landi

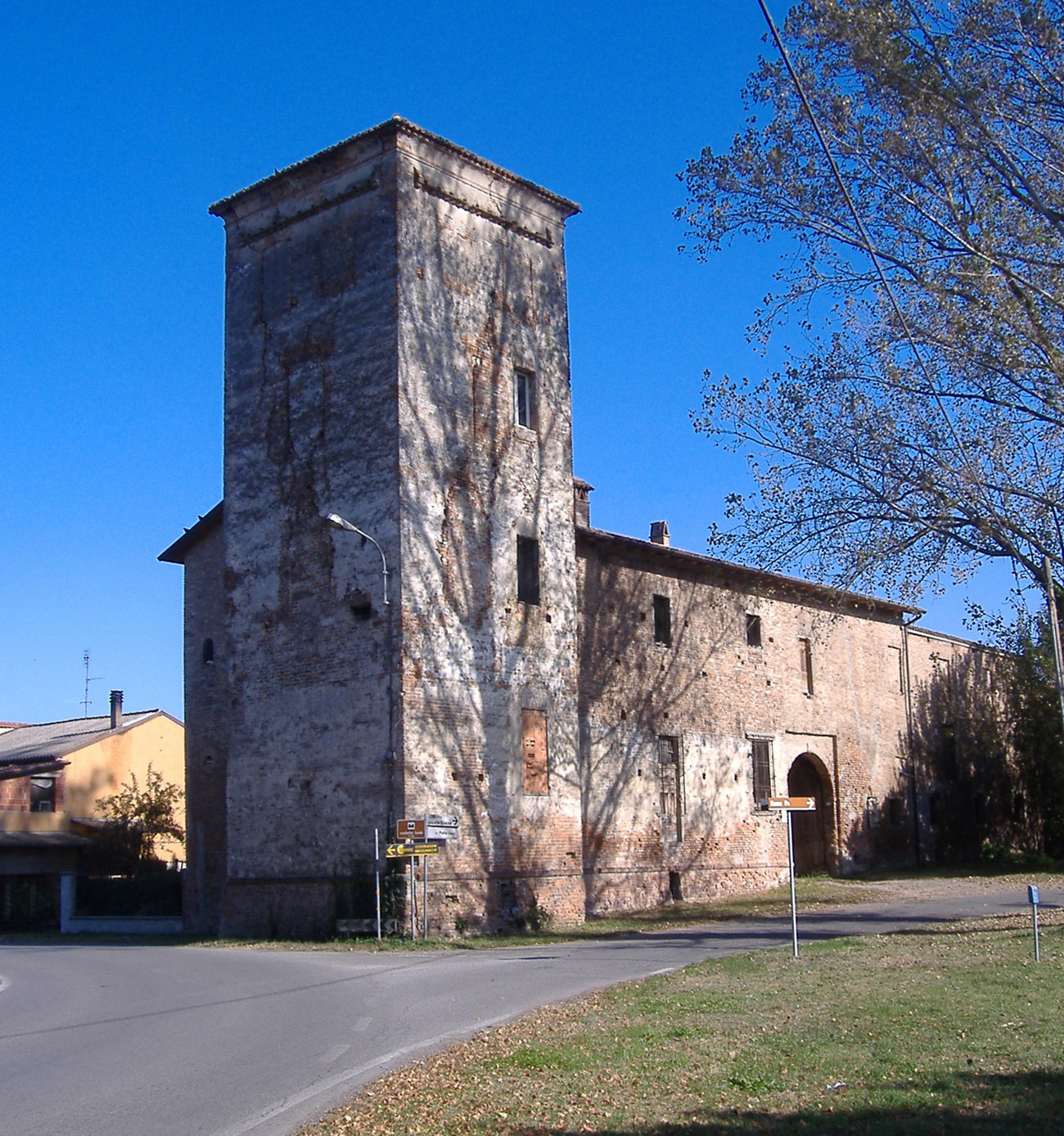
The old castle, 15th century

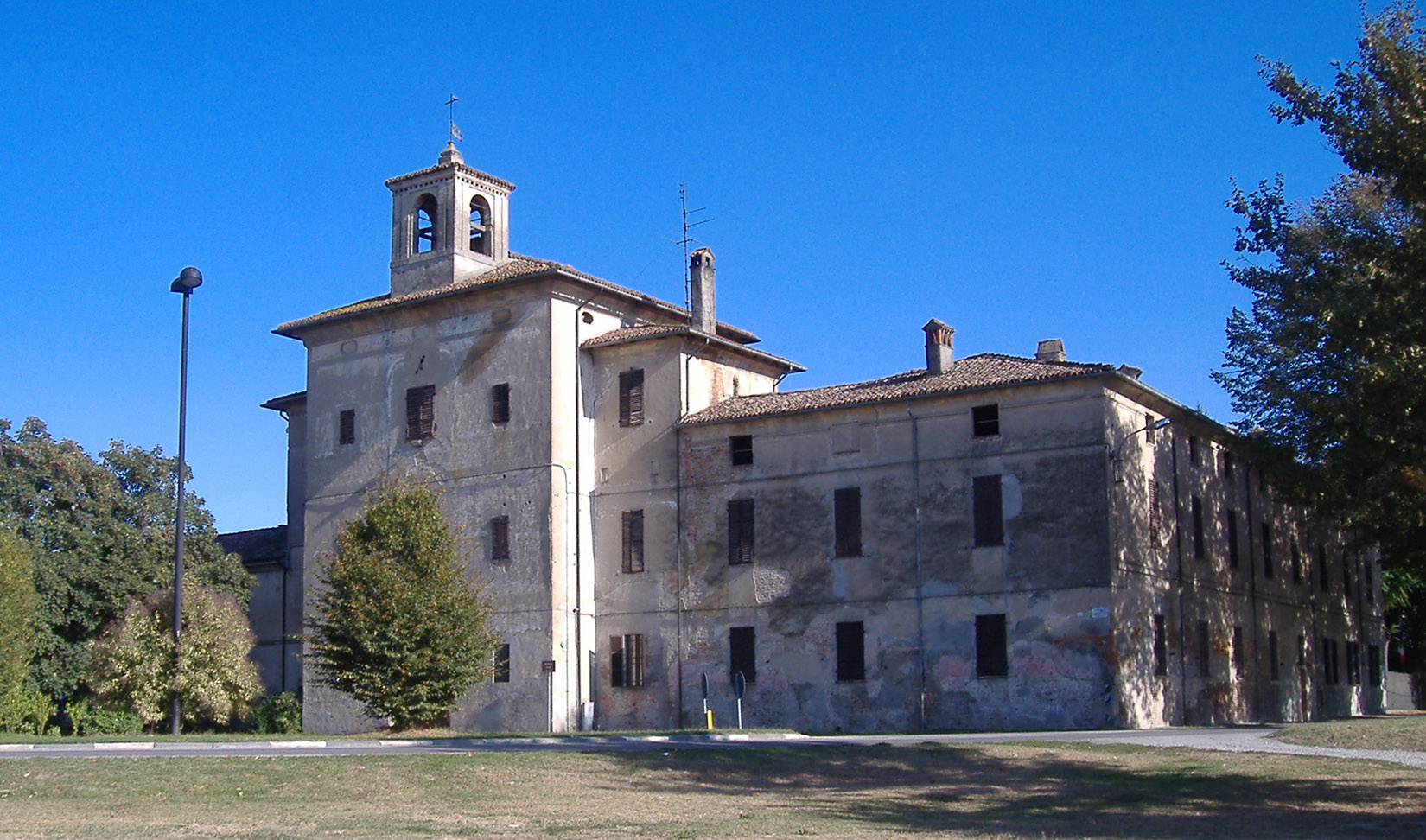
The new castle, 17th century

== People ==
- Giovanni Losi, Combonian missionary (1838-1882)
