= Spinadesco =

Spinadesco Spinadésch (Lombard)
- Comune
- Comune di Spinadesco
- Location within Italy Location within Lombardy
- Coordinates: 45°9′N 9°56′E
- Country: Italy
- Region: Lombardy
- Province: Cremona (CR)

Government
  - Mayor: Roberto Lazzari

Area
  - Total: 17.21 km^{2} (6.64 sq mi)
- Elevation: 48 m (157 ft)

Population (30 September 2016)
  - Total: 1,523
  - Density: 88.50/km^{2} (229.2/sq mi)
- Demonym: Spinadeschesi
- Time zone: UTC+1 (CET)
  - Summer (DST): UTC+2 (CEST)
- Postal code: 26020
- Dialing code: 0372
- Website: Official website

Spinadesco (Cremunés: Spinadésch) is a comune (municipality) in the Province of Cremona in the Italian region Lombardy, located about 70 kilometres (43 mi) southeast of Milan and about 8 kilometres (5 mi) west of Cremona.

Spinadesco borders the following municipalities: Acquanegra Cremonese, Castelvetro Piacentino, Cremona, Crotta d'Adda, Monticelli d'Ongina, Sesto ed Uniti.

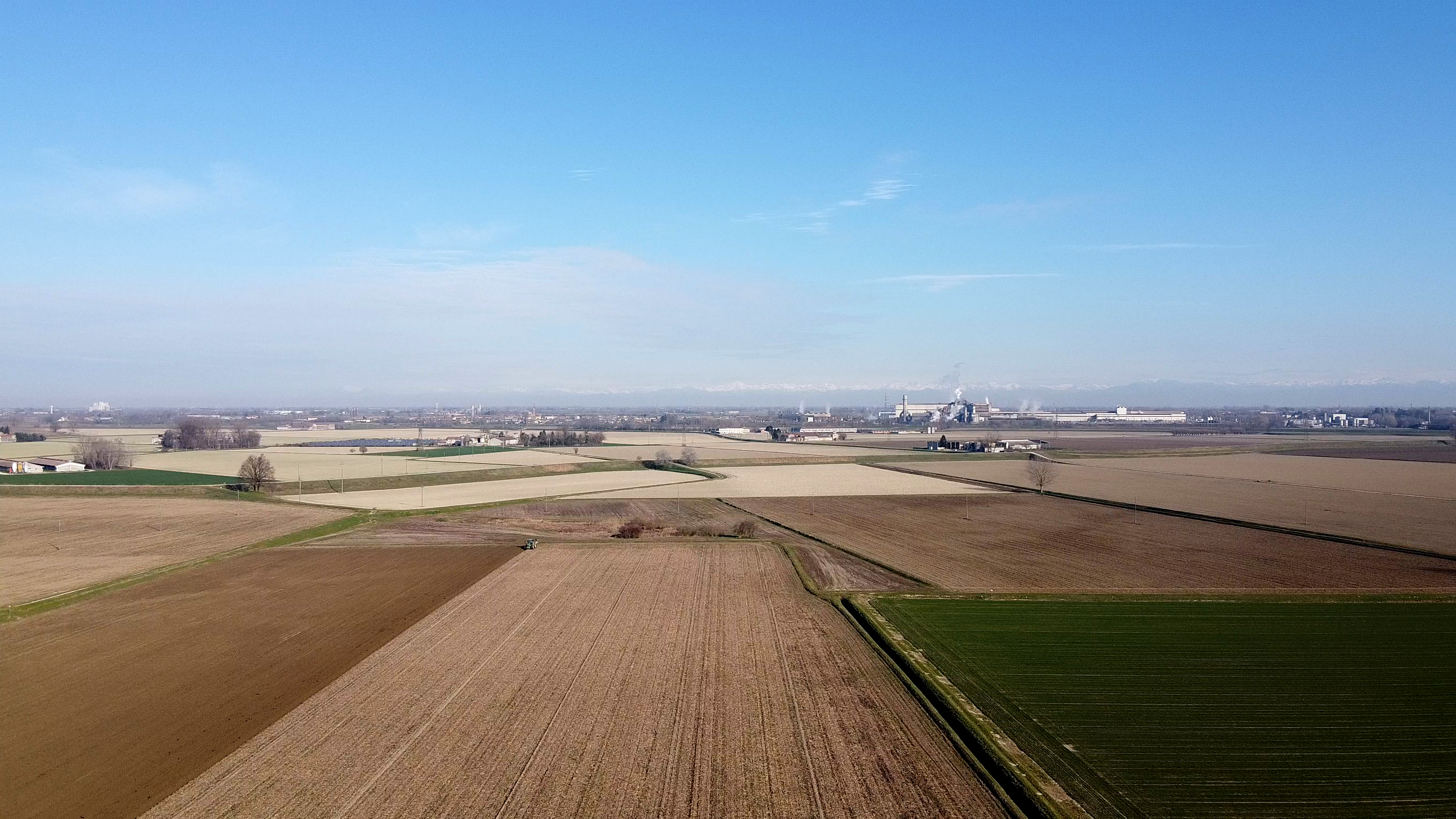
Spinadesco with the Alps in the background
