= Lardera, Cornovecchio =

Coordinates: 45°9′8″N 9°48′26″E

Lardera is a village in the province of Lodi in Italy. It is a frazione of the comune of Cornovecchio.

== History ==
The village became part of Corno Giovine in the Napoleonic era (1809–16).

Lardera was an agricultural locality of ancient origin, attested since the eleventh century. The territory joins also Cassina Campagnola.

During the Unification of Italy (1861) the municipality had 264 inhabitants. In 1866 it was aggregated to Cornovecchio.

Now the agricultural site is within the territory of the Park South Adda.
