= Caorso =

- Comune
- Comune di Caorso
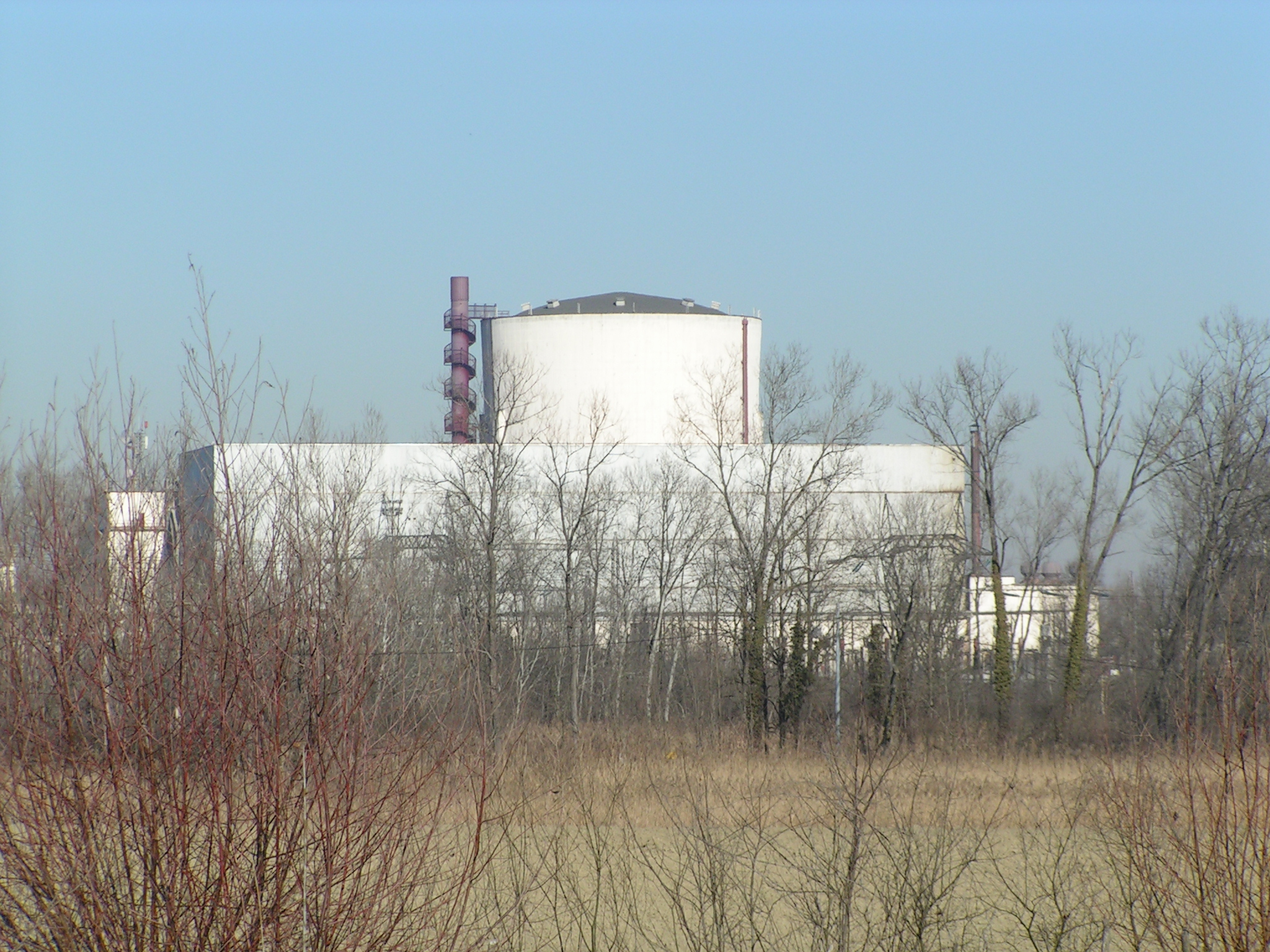
- The old nuclear plant.

- Location within Italy Location within Emilia-Romagna
- Coordinates: 45°3′N 9°52′E
- Country: Italy
- Region: Emilia-Romagna
- Province: Piacenza (PC)
- Frazioni: Muradolo, Zerbio, Roncarolo, Fossadello

Government
  - Mayor: Roberta Battaglia

Area
  - Total: 40.98 km^{2} (15.82 sq mi)
- Elevation: 46 m (151 ft)

Population (30 April 2017)
  - Total: 4,718
  - Density: 115.1/km^{2} (298.2/sq mi)
- Demonym: Caorsani
- Time zone: UTC+1 (CET)
  - Summer (DST): UTC+2 (CEST)
- Postal code: 29012
- Dialing code: 0523
- Website: Official website

Caorso (Piacentino: Caurs) is a comune (municipality) in the Province of Piacenza in the Italian region Emilia-Romagna, located about 130 kilometres (81 mi) northwest of Bologna and about 13 kilometres (8 mi) east of Piacenza.

Caorso borders the following municipalities: Caselle Landi, Castelnuovo Bocca d'Adda, Cortemaggiore, Monticelli d'Ongina, Piacenza, Pontenure, San Pietro in Cerro.

== Transportation ==
Caorso has a railway station on the Piacenza–Cremona line.
