= Cornovecchio =

Cornovecchio Corvèch (Lombard)
- Comune
- Comune di Cornovecchio
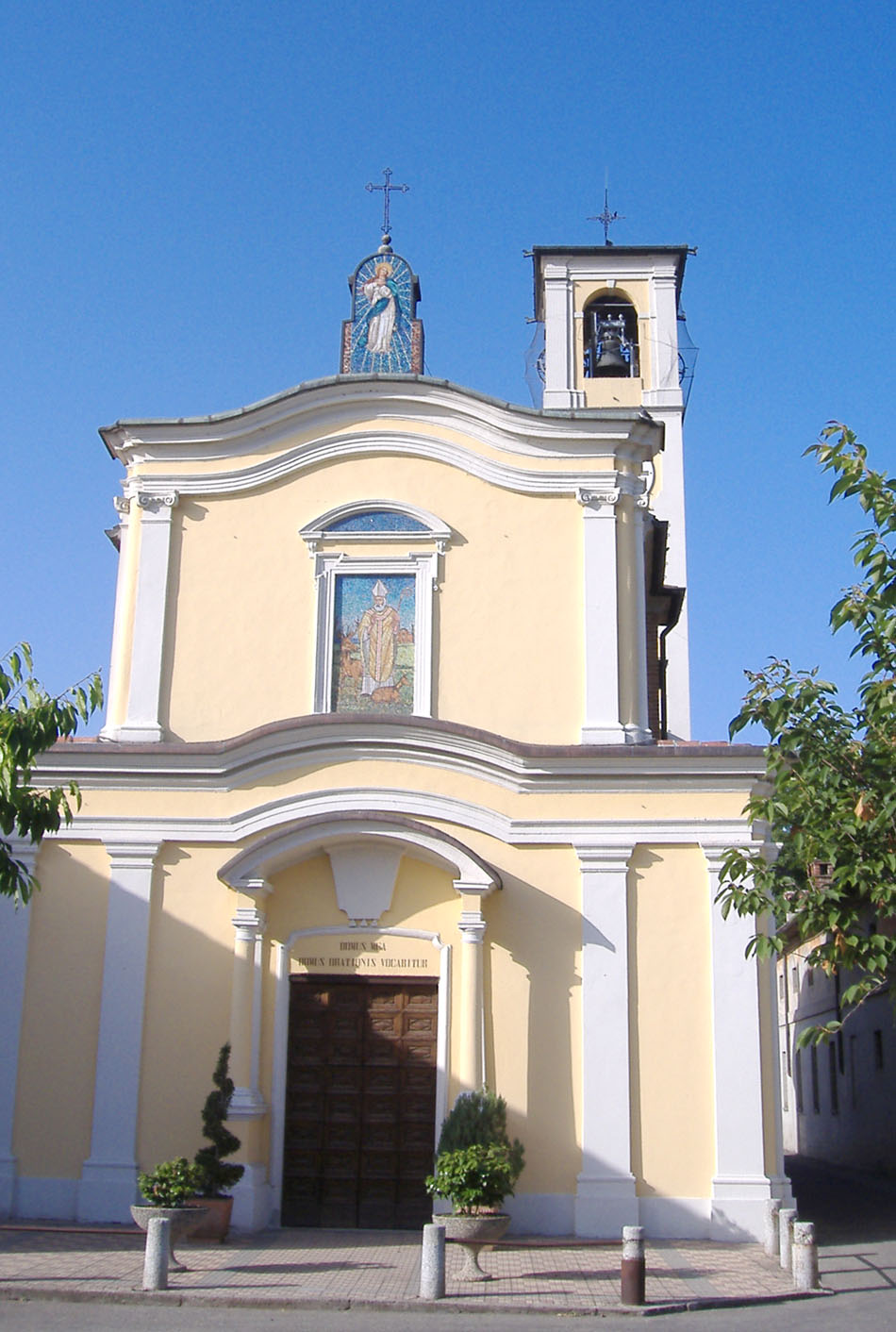

- Coat of arms

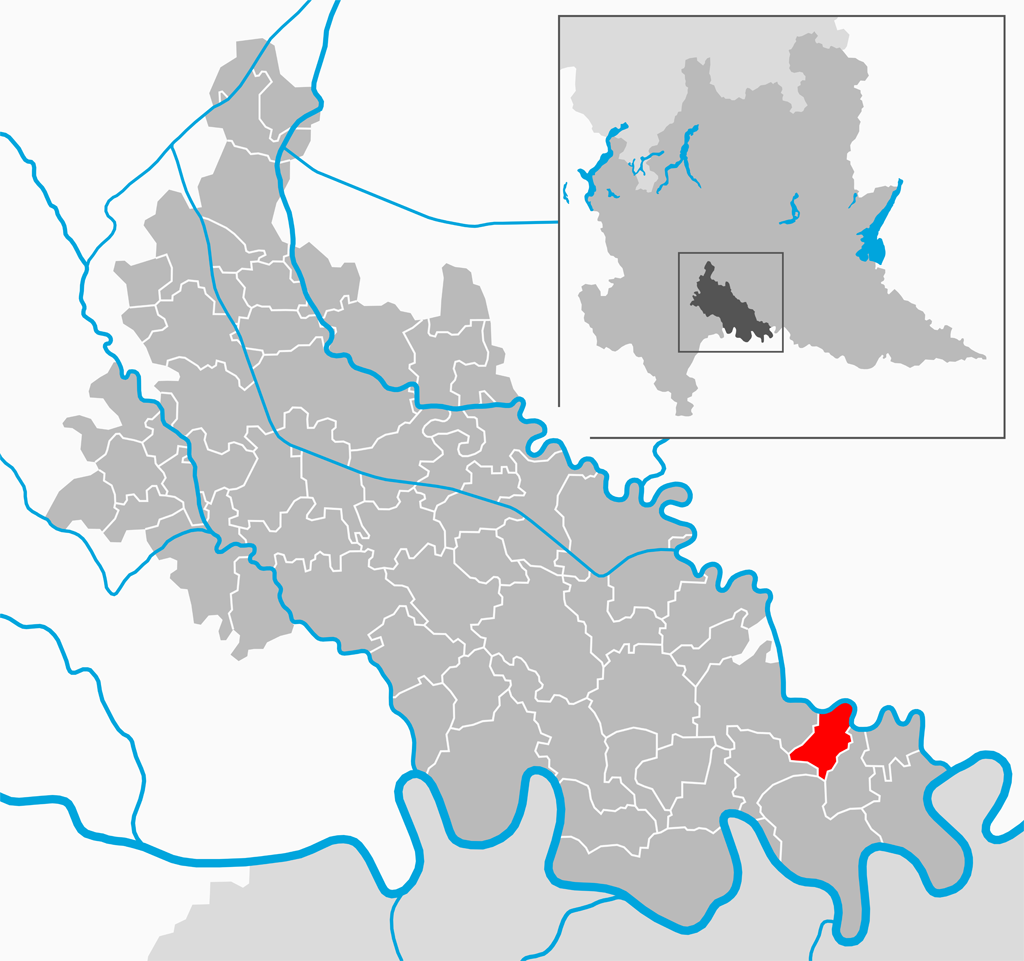

- Location within Italy Location within Lombardy
- Coordinates: 45°1′N 9°55′E
- Country: Italy
- Region: Lombardy
- Province: Lodi (LO)
- Frazioni: Lardera, Goretti

Government
  - Mayor: Veronica Piazzoli

Area
  - Total: 6.53 km^{2} (2.52 sq mi)
- Elevation: 52 m (171 ft)

Population (30 June 2017)
  - Total: 220
  - Density: 34/km^{2} (87/sq mi)
- Demonym: Cornovegini
- Time zone: UTC+1 (CET)
  - Summer (DST): UTC+2 (CEST)
- Postal code: 26842
- Dialing code: 0377
- Website: Official website

Cornovecchio (Lodigiano: Corvèch) is a comune (municipality) in the Province of Lodi in the Italian region Lombardy, located about 80 kilometres (50 mi) southeast of Milan and about 45 kilometres (28 mi) southeast of Lodi.

Cornovecchio borders the following municipalities: Pizzighettone, Maleo, Crotta d'Adda, Meleti, Corno Giovine, Caselle Landi.
