= Cappella Cantone =

- Comune
- Comune di Cappella Cantone
- Location within Italy Location within Lombardy
- Coordinates: 45°15′N 9°50′E
- Country: Italy
- Region: Lombardy
- Province: Cremona (CR)

Government
  - Mayor: Pierluigi Tadi

Area
  - Total: 13.15 km^{2} (5.08 sq mi)
- Elevation: 60 m (200 ft)

Population (31 May 2017)
  - Total: 566
  - Density: 43.0/km^{2} (111/sq mi)
- Demonym: Cappellacantonesi
- Time zone: UTC+1 (CET)
  - Summer (DST): UTC+2 (CEST)
- Postal code: 26020
- Dialing code: 0374
- Website: Official website

Cappella Cantone (Soresinese: Capéla) is a comune (municipality) in the Province of Cremona in the Italian region of Lombardy, located about 60 kilometres (37 mi) southeast of Milan and about 20 kilometres (12 mi) northwest of Cremona.

Cappella Cantone borders the following municipalities: Annicco, Castelleone, Grumello Cremonese ed Uniti, Pizzighettone, San Bassano, Soresina.
