= Maccastorna =

Maccastorna Macastùrna (Lombard)
- Comune
- Comune di Maccastorna
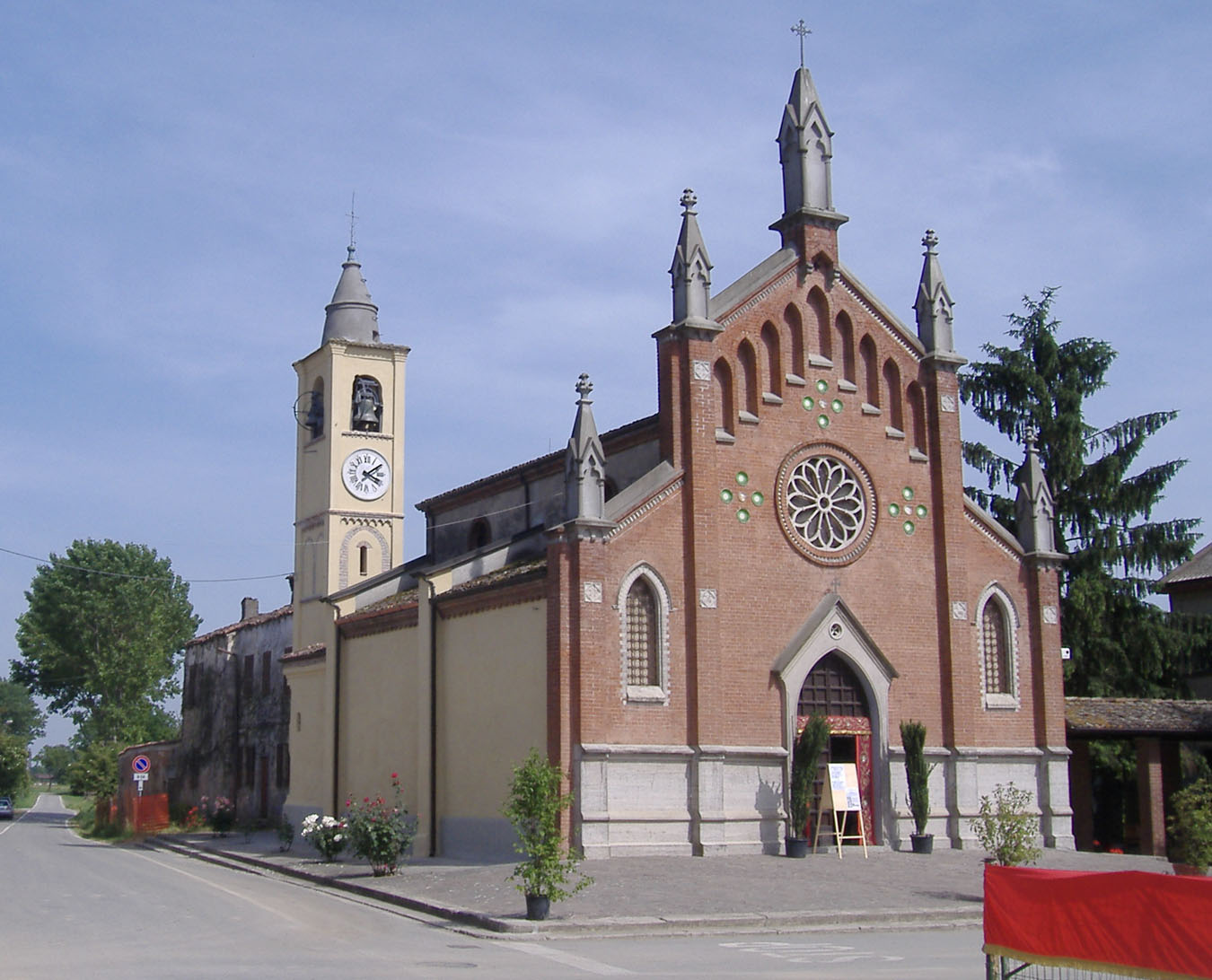

- Location within Italy Location within Lombardy
- Coordinates: 45°10′N 9°41′E
- Country: Italy
- Region: Lombardy
- Province: Lodi (LO)

Government
  - Mayor: Fabrizio Santantonio

Area
  - Total: 5.75 km^{2} (2.22 sq mi)
- Elevation: 45 m (148 ft)

Population (30 September 2017)
  - Total: 69
  - Density: 12/km^{2} (31/sq mi)
- Demonym: Maccastornesi
- Time zone: UTC+1 (CET)
  - Summer (DST): UTC+2 (CEST)
- Postal code: 26843
- Dialing code: 0377
- Website: Official website

Maccastorna (Lodigiano: Macastùrna) is a comune (municipality) in the Province of Lodi in the Italian region Lombardy, located about 50 kilometres (31 mi) southeast of Milan and about 20 kilometres (12 mi) southeast of Lodi.

Maccastorna borders the following municipalities: Crotta d'Adda, Meleti, Castelnuovo Bocca d'Adda. As of 2011, it is the 11th least-populated Italian commune.

Sights include a 13th-14th-century castle and the c. 12th-century parish church (largely renovated in the 20th century).

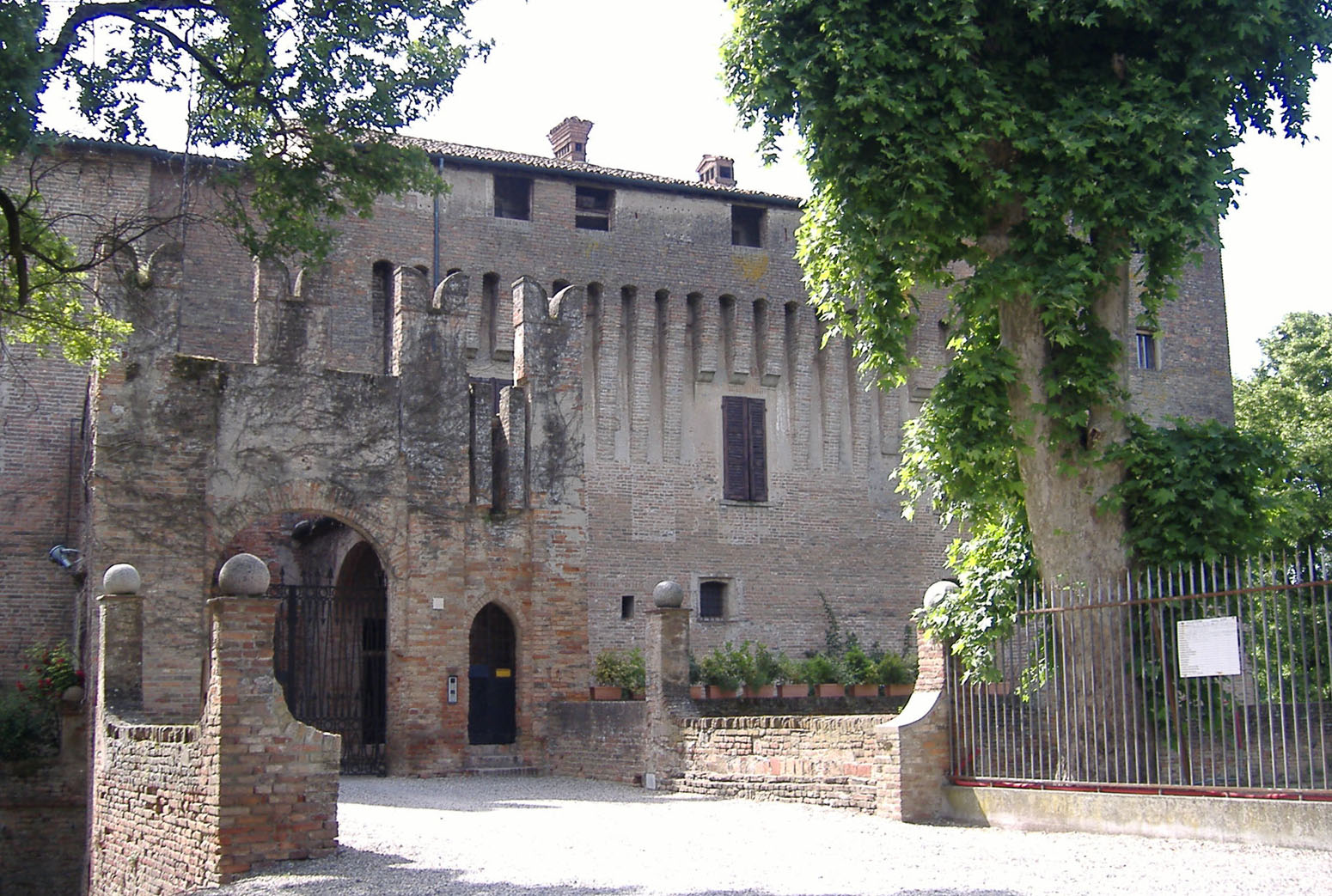
Maccastorna castle
