= Castelnuovo Bocca d'Adda =

Castelnuovo Bocca d'Adda Castelnöu (Lombard)
- Comune
- Comune di Castelnuovo Bocca d'Adda
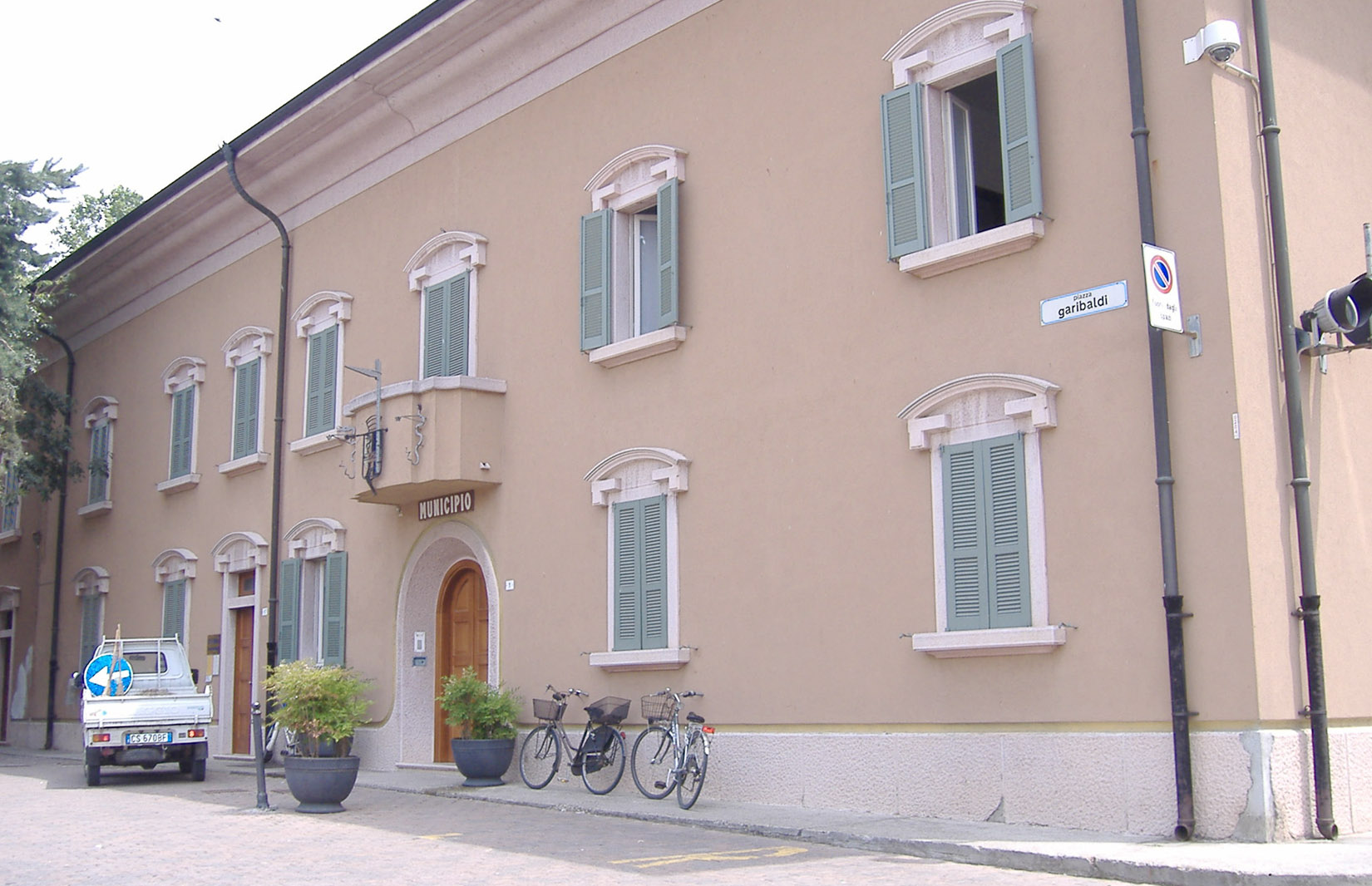
- Town hall.

- Coat of arms

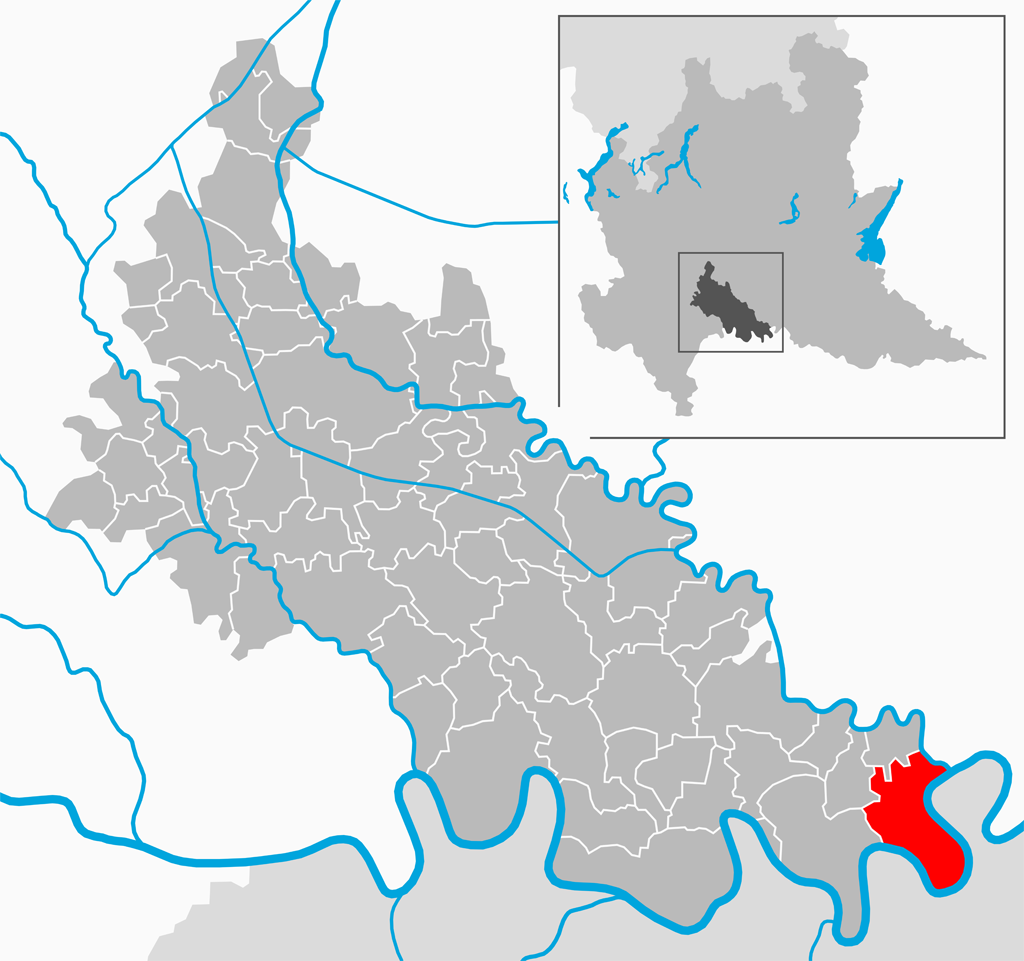

- Location within Italy Location within Lombardy
- Coordinates: 45°7′N 9°52′E
- Country: Italy
- Region: Lombardy
- Province: Lodi (LO)

Government
  - Mayor: Marcello Schiavi (since May 26, 2014)

Area
  - Total: 20.33 km^{2} (7.85 sq mi)
- Elevation: 49 m (161 ft)

Population (30 June 2017)
  - Total: 1,619
  - Density: 79.64/km^{2} (206.3/sq mi)
- Demonym: Castelnovesi
- Time zone: UTC+1 (CET)
  - Summer (DST): UTC+2 (CEST)
- Postal code: 26843
- Dialing code: 0377
- Website: Official website

Castelnuovo Bocca d'Adda (Lodigiano: Castelnöu) is a comune (municipality) in the Province of Lodi in the Italian region of Lombardy, located about 70 kilometres (43 mi) southeast of Milan and about 35 kilometres (22 mi) southeast of Lodi.

Castelnuovo Bocca d'Adda borders the following municipalities: Crotta d'Adda, Maccastorna, Meleti, Monticelli d'Ongina, Caselle Landi, Caorso.
