= Crotta d'Adda =

- Comune
- Comune di Crotta d'Adda
- Location within Italy Location within Lombardy
- Coordinates: 45°10′N 9°51′E
- Country: Italy
- Region: Lombardy
- Province: Cremona (CR)

Government
  - Mayor: Renato Gerevini

Area
  - Total: 13.0 km^{2} (5.0 sq mi)
- Elevation: 52 m (171 ft)

Population (30 June 2017)
  - Total: 637
  - Density: 49.0/km^{2} (127/sq mi)
- Demonym: Crottesi
- Time zone: UTC+1 (CET)
  - Summer (DST): UTC+2 (CEST)
- Postal code: 26020
- Dialing code: 0372
- Patron saint: St. Lawrence
- Website: Official website

Crotta d'Adda (Cremunés: Cròta) is a comune (municipality) in the Province of Cremona in the Italian region Lombardy, located about 60 kilometres (37 mi) southeast of Milan and about 15 kilometres (9.3 mi) west of Cremona.

Crotta d'Adda borders the following municipalities: Acquanegra Cremonese, Castelnuovo Bocca d'Adda, Cornovecchio, Grumello Cremonese ed Uniti, Maccastorna, Meleti, Monticelli d'Ongina, Pizzighettone, Spinadesco.
