= Monticelli d'Ongina =

- Comune
- Comune di Monticelli d'Ongina
- Location within Italy Location within Emilia-Romagna
- Coordinates: 45°5′N 9°56′E
- Country: Italy
- Region: Emilia-Romagna
- Province: Piacenza (PC)
- Frazioni: Borgonovo, Fogarole, Isola Serafini, Olza, San Nazzaro, San Pietro in Corte

Government
  - Mayor: Gimmi Distante

Area
  - Total: 46.4 km^{2} (17.9 sq mi)
- Elevation: 40 m (130 ft)

Population (30 November 2017)
  - Total: 6,990
  - Density: 151/km^{2} (390/sq mi)
- Demonym: Monticellesi
- Time zone: UTC+1 (CET)
  - Summer (DST): UTC+2 (CEST)
- Postal code: 694202
- Dialing code: 0523
- Website: Official website

Monticelli d'Ongina (Piacentino: Muntṡéi [muŋtˈzeːi]) is a comune (municipality) in the Province of Piacenza in the Italian region Emilia-Romagna, located about 130 kilometres (81 mi) northwest of Bologna and about 20 kilometres (12 mi) east of Piacenza.

Monticelli d'Ongina borders the following municipalities: Caorso, Castelnuovo Bocca d'Adda, Castelvetro Piacentino, Cremona, Crotta d'Adda, San Pietro in Cerro, Spinadesco, Villanova sull'Arda.

Sights include the rocca (a 15th-century fortress built by Rolando Pallavicino), now housing an ethnographical museum, and the Abbey Basilica.

Natives of Monticelli d'Ongina include the composer Amilcare Zanella.
