= Meleti =

Meleti Melét (Lombard)
- Comune
- Comune di Meleti
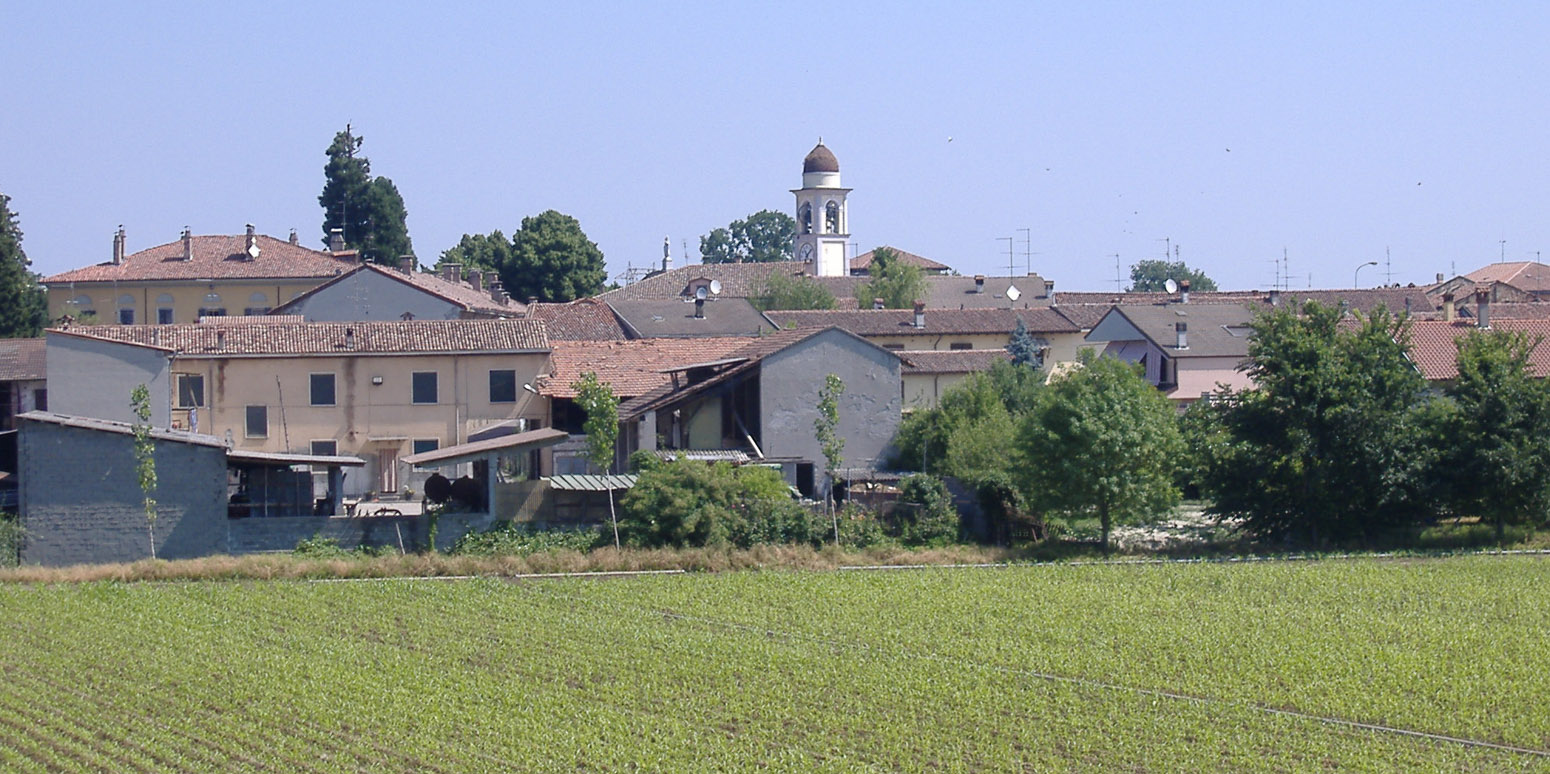

- Coat of arms

- Location within Italy Location within Lombardy
- Coordinates: 45°10′N 9°51′E
- Country: Italy
- Region: Lombardy
- Province: Lodi (LO)

Government
  - Mayor: Mario Raffaele Rocca

Area
  - Total: 7.39 km^{2} (2.85 sq mi)
- Elevation: 40 m (130 ft)

Population (31 October 2017)
  - Total: 446
  - Density: 60.4/km^{2} (156/sq mi)
- Demonym: Meletesi
- Time zone: UTC+1 (CET)
  - Summer (DST): UTC+2 (CEST)
- Postal code: 26843
- Dialing code: 0377
- Website: Official website

Meleti (Lodigiano: Melét; locally Mlìd) is a comune (municipality) in the Province of Lodi in the Italian region Lombardy, located about 60 kilometres (37 mi) southeast of Milan and about 30 kilometres (19 mi) southeast of Lodi.

Meleti borders the following municipalities: Crotta d'Adda, Cornovecchio, Maccastorna, Castelnuovo Bocca d'Adda, Caselle Landi.
