= Giovanni Losi =

Italian presbyter and missionary (1838-1882)

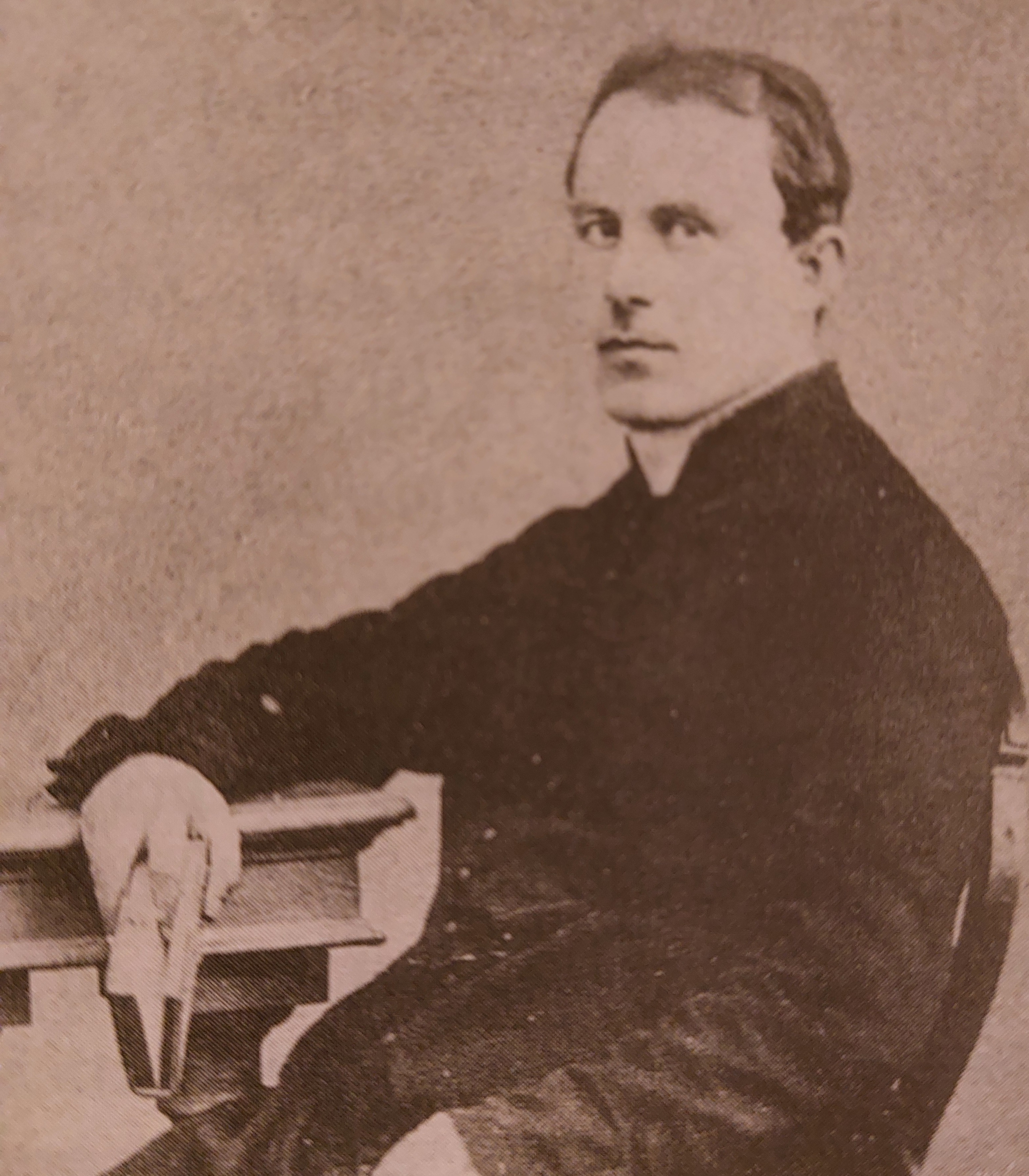
- Losi about 1865
- Born: Giovanni Losi; 29 November 1838; Caselle Landi, Kingdom of Lombardy–Venetia
- Died: 27 December 1882 (aged 44); El Obeid, Sudan

Giovanni Losi M.C.C.I., (Italian pronunciation: [dʒoˈvanni ˈlɔːzi]; born 29 November 1838 – 27 December 1882) was an Italian Catholic priest. He was a member of the Comboni Missionaries of the Heart of Jesus and acted the majority of his ministry in South Sudan.

He published, with father Luigi Bonomi, the first catechism and dictionary in Nobiin language, unknown in Europe until that moment.

== Early life ==
Born in Caselle Landi, Lombardy, in 1838, he was baptized on the same day in the village's parish church. The family moved to Roncaglia when he was still a child. When he was older, he entered the Episcopal seminary of Piacenza. He was ordained a priest in 1862.

== Missionary ==
In 1872, he entered the Missionary Institute of Verona, founded by Daniele Comboni, to leave with him for Sudan the following year. He became the personal confessor of father Comboni.

He was superior of the El Obeid mission until 1878. He did not have good relations with the native Sudanese Muslim population, who had always opposed him. After Comboni's death in 1881, he was appointed superior ad interim for the entire Central African mission. He fell ill with scurvy and died on 27 December 1882 at the age of 44.

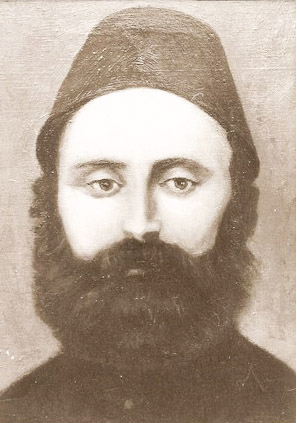
Father Losi, during his mission in Sudan.

He was buried in El-Obeid, but his tomb was desecrated by fundamentalists when the Mahadis conquered the region in 1889.

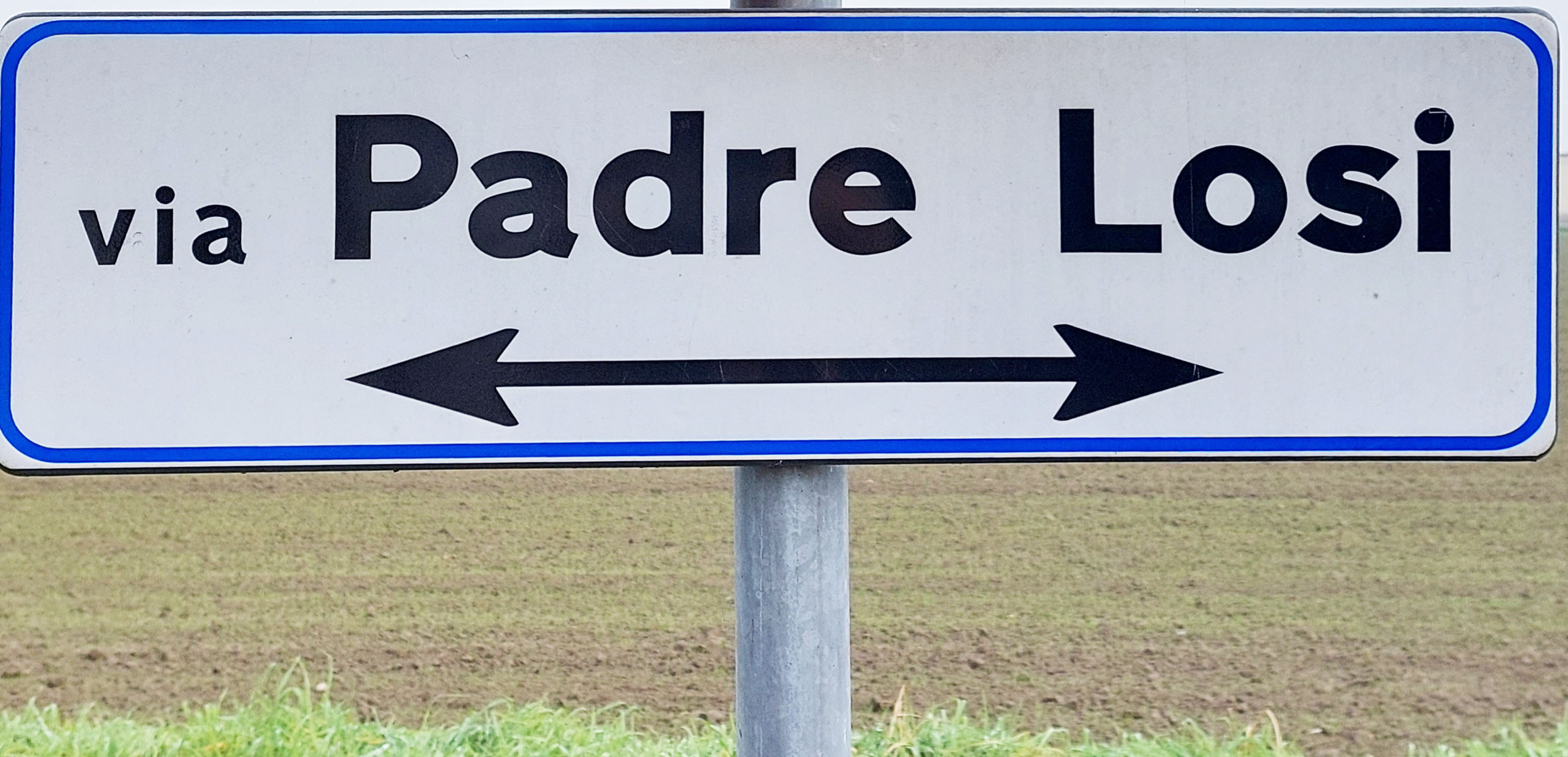
The plate of the street dedicated to father Losi, in Caselle Landi.

== Post mortem ==
In Caselle Landi, the street that runs alongside the church and leads to the countryside was dedicated to him.
