= Grumello Cremonese ed Uniti =

- Comune
- Comune di Grumello Cremonese ed Uniti
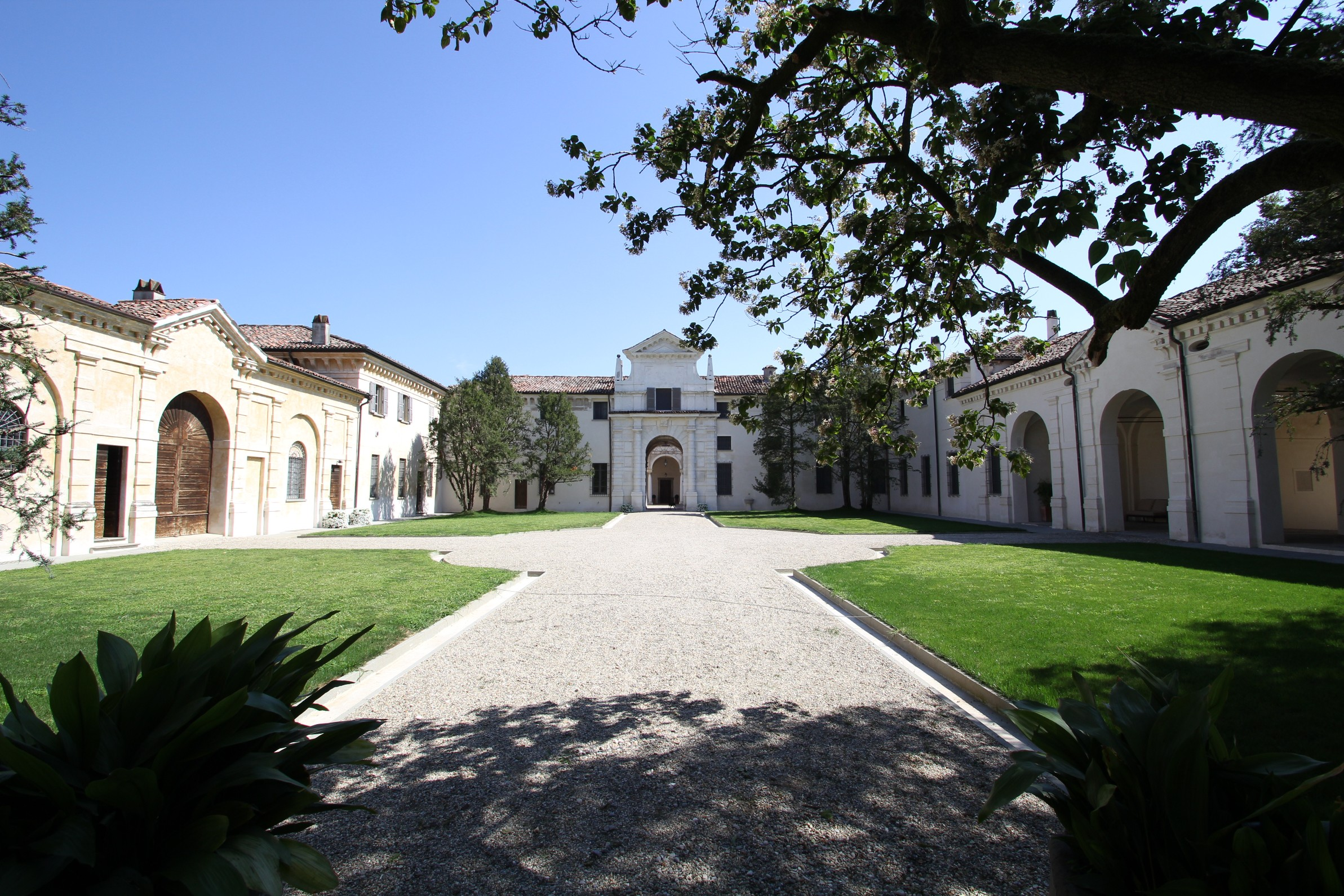

- Location within Italy Location within Lombardy
- Coordinates: 45°12′N 9°51′E
- Country: Italy
- Region: Lombardy
- Province: Cremona (CR)
- Frazioni: Farfengo, Zanengo

Government
  - Mayor: Fabio Scio

Area
  - Total: 22.29 km^{2} (8.61 sq mi)
- Elevation: 50 m (160 ft)

Population (31 August 2017)
  - Total: 1,781
  - Density: 79.90/km^{2} (206.9/sq mi)
- Demonym: Grumellesi
- Time zone: UTC+1 (CET)
  - Summer (DST): UTC+2 (CEST)
- Postal code: 26023
- Dialing code: 0372
- Website: Official website

Grumello Cremonese ed Uniti (Cremunés: Grümél) is a comune (municipality) in the Province of Cremona in the Italian region Lombardy, located about 60 kilometres (37 mi) southeast of Milan and about 15 kilometres (9.3 mi) northwest of Cremona. Grumello Cremonese ed Uniti borders the following municipalities: Acquanegra Cremonese, Annicco, Cappella Cantone, Crotta d'Adda, Pizzighettone, Sesto ed Uniti.
