= Acquanegra Cremonese =

- Comune
- Comune di Acquanegra Cremonese
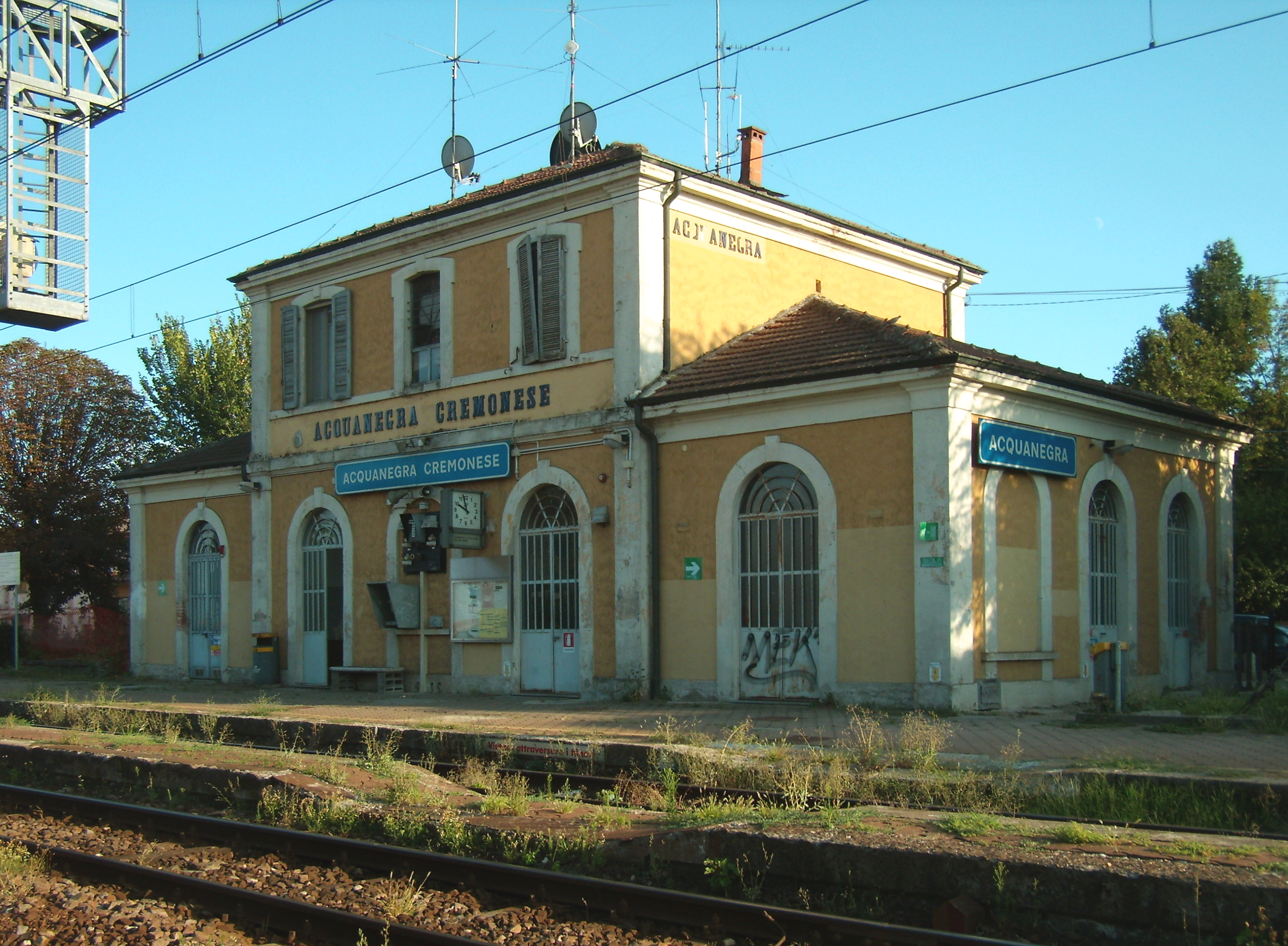
- The train station

- Location of Acquanegra Cremonese in Italy Acquanegra Cremonese (Lombardy)
- Coordinates: 45°10′N 9°53′E
- Country: Italy
- Region: Lombardy
- Province: Cremona (CR)

Government
  - Mayor: Luciano Lanfredi

Area
  - Total: 9.22 km^{2} (3.56 sq mi)
- Elevation: 45 m (148 ft)

Population (30 April 2017)
  - Total: 1,178
  - Density: 128/km^{2} (331/sq mi)
- Demonym: Acquanegrini
- Time zone: UTC+1 (CET)
  - Summer (DST): UTC+2 (CEST)
- Postal code: 26020
- Dialing code: 0372
- Website: Official website

Acquanegra Cremonese (Cremunés: Cuanégra) is a comune (municipality) in the Province of Cremona in the Italian region Lombardy, located about 70 kilometres (43 mi) southeast of Milan and about 12 kilometres (7 mi) northwest of Cremona.

Acquanegra Cremonese borders the following municipalities: Crotta d'Adda, Grumello Cremonese ed Uniti, Sesto ed Uniti, Spinadesco.
