= Soresina =

Soresina Suresìna (Lombard)
- Comune
- Città di Soresina
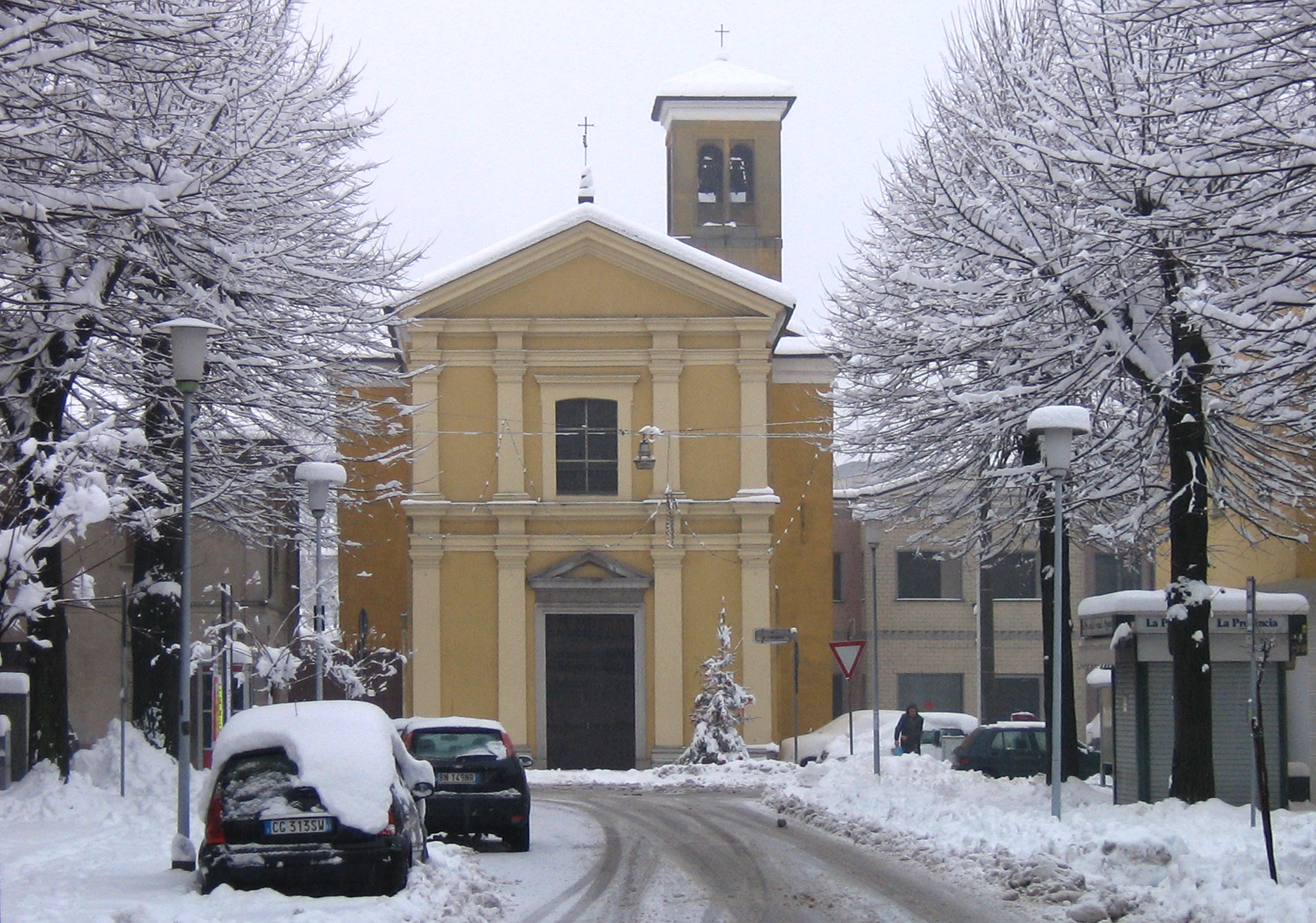
- Church of Madonna della Mercede.

- Coat of arms

- Location within Italy Location within Lombardy
- Coordinates: 45°18′N 9°51′E
- Country: Italy
- Region: Lombardy
- Province: Cremona (CR)
- Frazioni: Olzano, Moscona, Dossi Pisani, Ariadello

Government
  - Mayor: Diego Vairani

Area
  - Total: 28.57 km^{2} (11.03 sq mi)
- Elevation: 45 m (148 ft)

Population (28 February 2017)
  - Total: 8,933
  - Density: 312.7/km^{2} (809.8/sq mi)
- Demonym: Soresinesi
- Time zone: UTC+1 (CET)
  - Summer (DST): UTC+2 (CEST)
- Postal code: 26015
- Dialing code: 0374
- Patron saint: Saint Syrus of Pavia
- Saint day: 9 December
- Website: Official website

Soresina (Soresinese: Suresìna) is a comune (municipality) in the Province of Cremona in the Italian region Lombardy, located about 60 kilometres (37 mi) southeast of Milan and about 25 kilometres (16 mi) northwest of Cremona.

It received the honorary title of city with a presidential decree on 27 October 1962.

Soresina borders the following municipalities: Annicco, Cappella Cantone, Casalmorano, Castelleone, Cumignano sul Naviglio, Genivolta, Trigolo.

== Transportation ==
Soresina has a railway station on the Treviglio–Cremona line.
