= Paderno Ponchielli =

- Comune
- Comune di Paderno Ponchielli
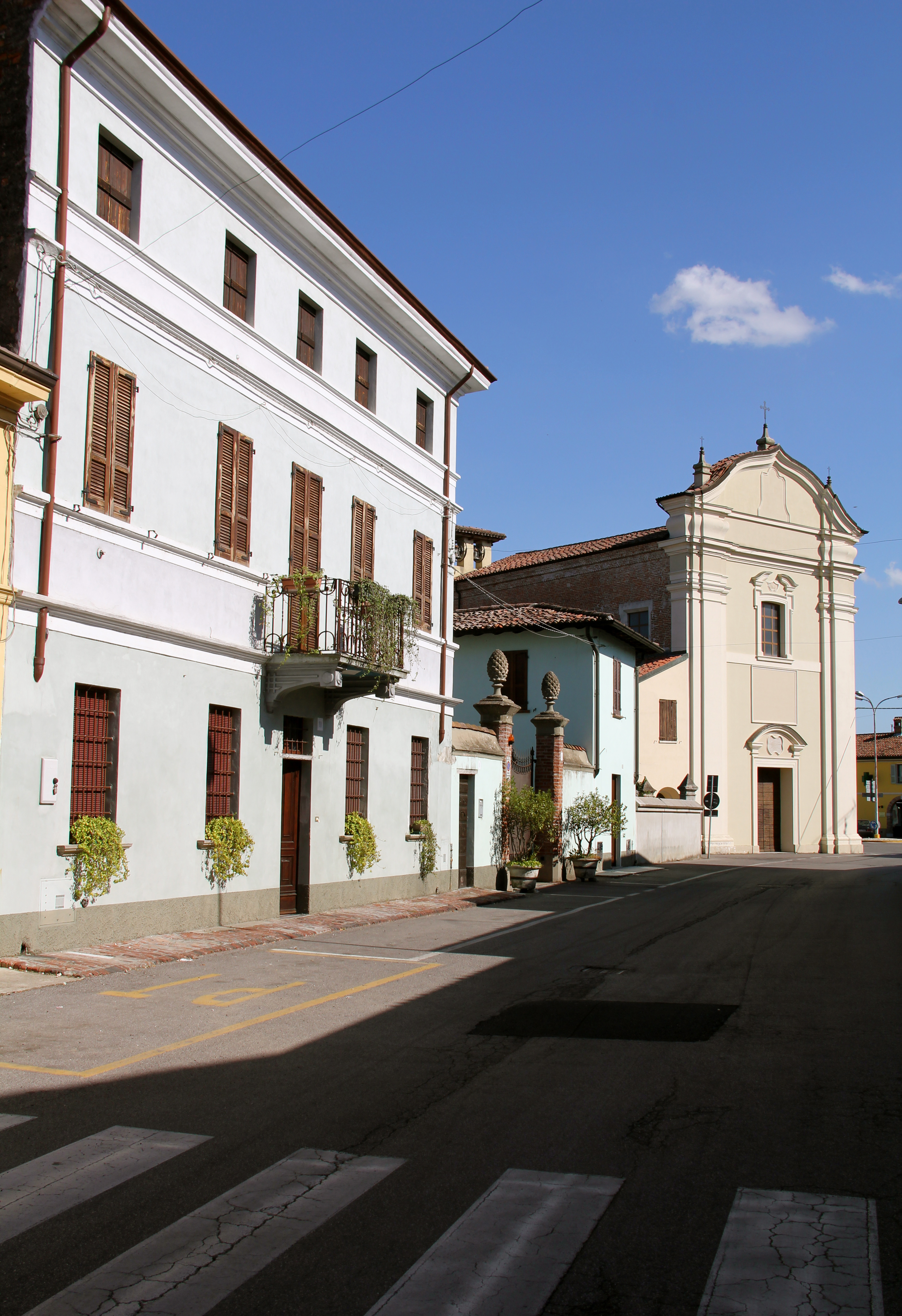

- Location within Italy Location within Lombardy
- Coordinates: 45°14′16″N 09°55′40″E
- Country: Italy
- Region: Lombardy
- Province: Cremona (CR)
- Frazioni: Acqualunga Badona

Government
  - Mayor: Cristiano Strinati

Area
  - Total: 24 km^{2} (9.3 sq mi)
- Elevation: 58 m (190 ft)

Population (31 December 2017)
  - Total: 1,420
  - Density: 59/km^{2} (150/sq mi)
- Demonym: Padernesi
- Time zone: UTC+1 (CET)
  - Summer (DST): UTC+2 (CEST)
- Postal code: 26024
- Dialing code: 0374
- Patron saint: St. Dalmatius
- Saint day: 5 December
- Website: http://www.comunedipadernoponchielli.gov.it/

Paderno Ponchielli (Soresinese: Padèrnu; Cremunés: Padérnu) is a comune in the province of Cremona, in Lombardy, northern Italy.

Before the unification of Italy in 1861, the town was known just as Paderno. After unification, the new government called on various municipalities with the same name to adjust and differentiate them. “Fasolaro” got added to the name Paderno. However, this did not meet with universal public approval as the word alluded to the production of common cowpeas (black-eyed peas) widespread in the area, which was considered as a possible source of mockery in neighboring communities.

In 1878, Umberto I, King of Italy, changed the name from Paderno Fasolaro to Paderno Cremonese. In 1928, when Paderno merged with the neighboring Ossolaro, the area took the name Paderno Ossolaro. Then, in 1934, with the celebration of 100th birthday of their native son, the composer Amilcare Ponchielli, the citizens petitioned to change the name to Paderno Ponchielli to honor him. On November 25, 1950, by a decree of the President of the Republic, Luigi Einaudi, the municipality came to be officially called Paderno Ponchielli.
