= Capitolium =

Roman temple

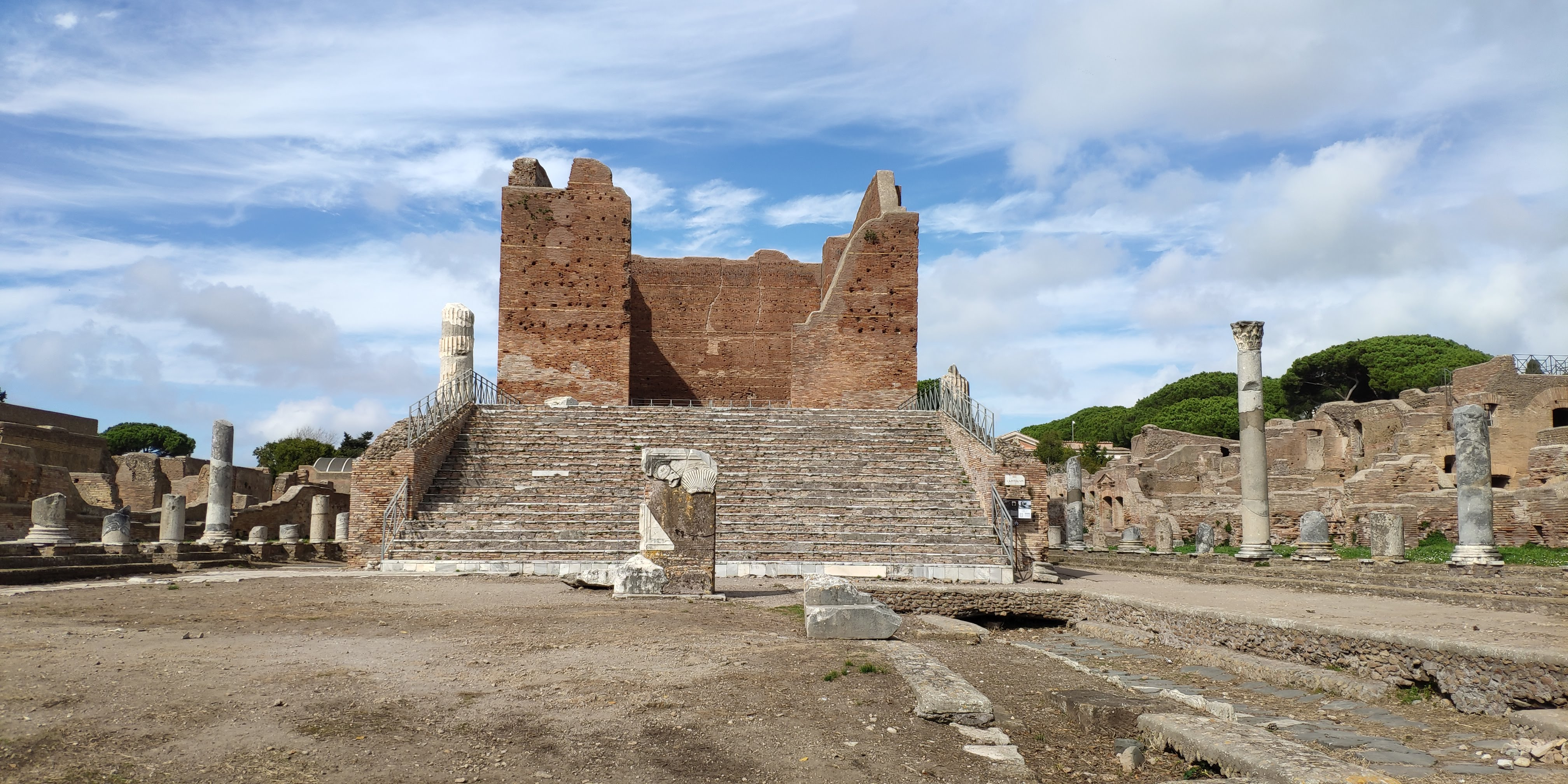
Capitolium in Ostia Antica

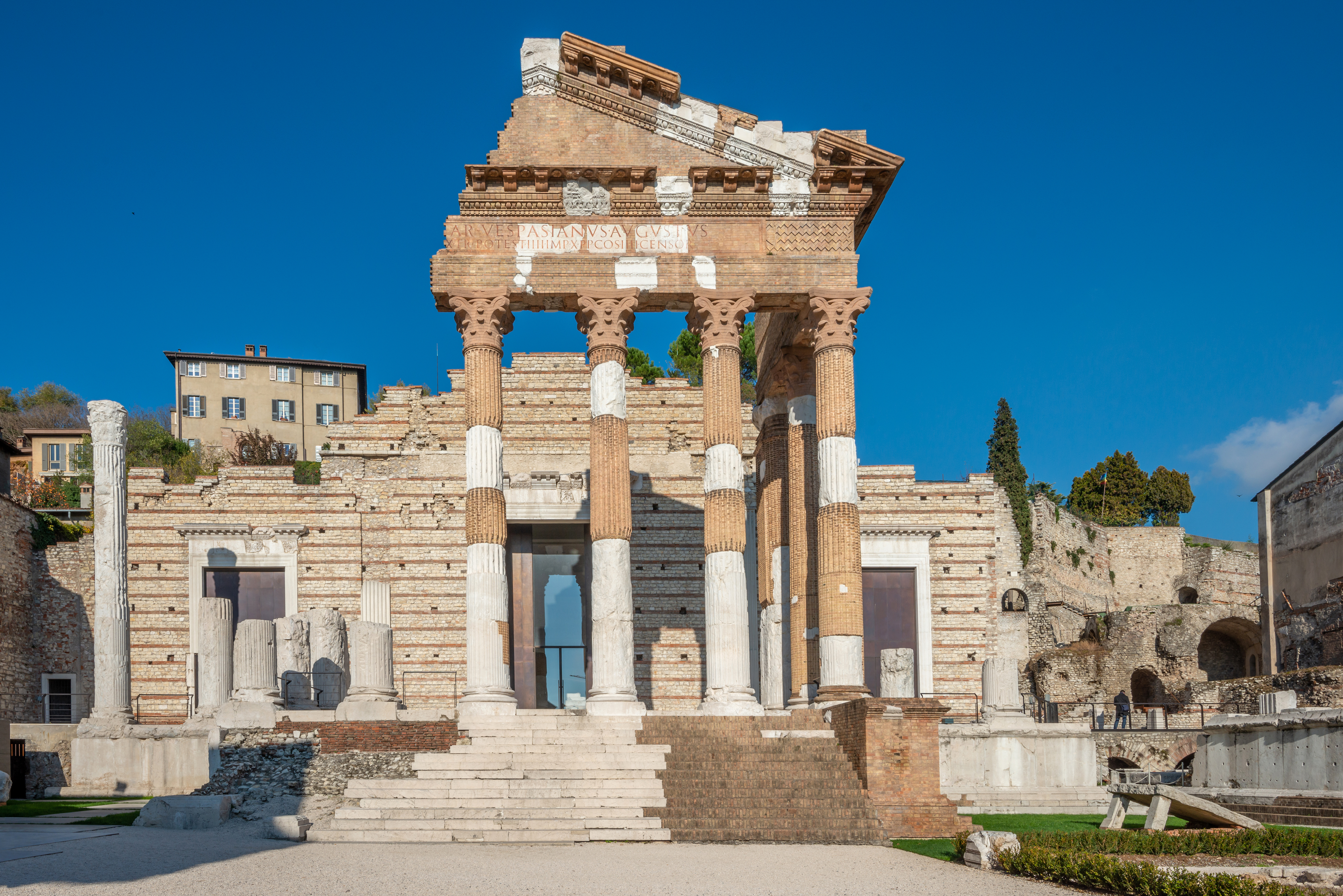
Capitolium of Brixia

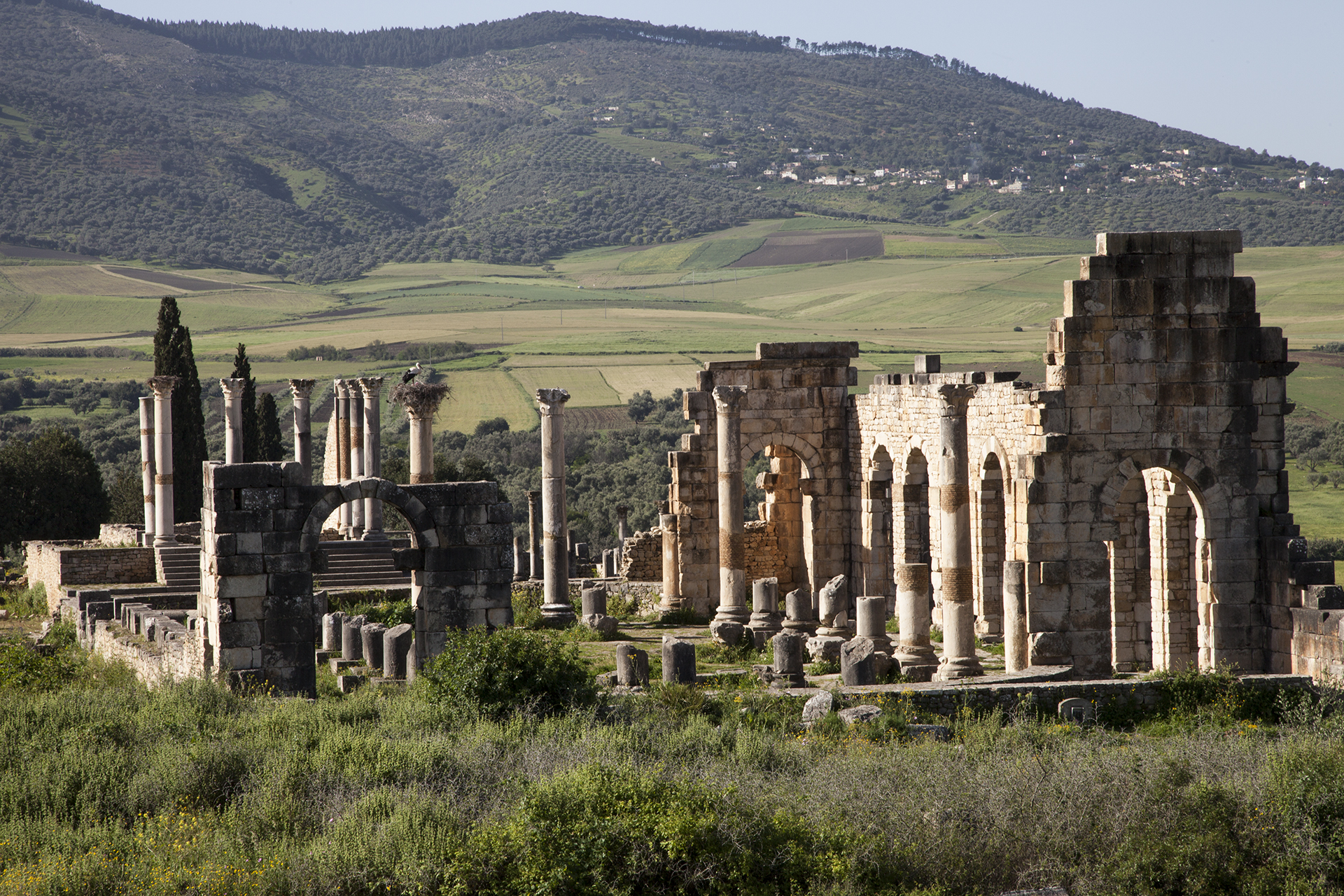
Capitoline Temple at Volubilis

A Capitolium (Latin) was an ancient Roman temple dedicated to the Capitoline Triad of gods Jupiter, Juno and Minerva. A capitolium was built on a prominent area in many cities in Italy and the Roman provinces, particularly during the Augustan and Julio-Claudian periods. Most had a triple cella, one for each god.

The first capitolium was on the Capitoline Hill in Rome and was considered the centre of the city, where it meant the Temple of Jupiter Optimus Maximus and afterwards the Latin word was used for the whole hill.

The earliest known example outside of Italy was at Emporion (now Empúries, Spain).

Examples of capitolia are:

- Capitolium Vetus (Rome)
- Temple of Jupiter (Pompeii)
- Capitolium of Minturnae
- Capitolium of Ostia Antica
- Capitolium of Brixia (Brescia)
- Capitolium of Constantinople
- Capitoline Temple at Volubilis
- Capitolium of Cosa
