= Basilica of San Salvatore, Spoleto =

Church building in Spoleto, Italy

Coordinates: 42.7419°N 12.7434°E

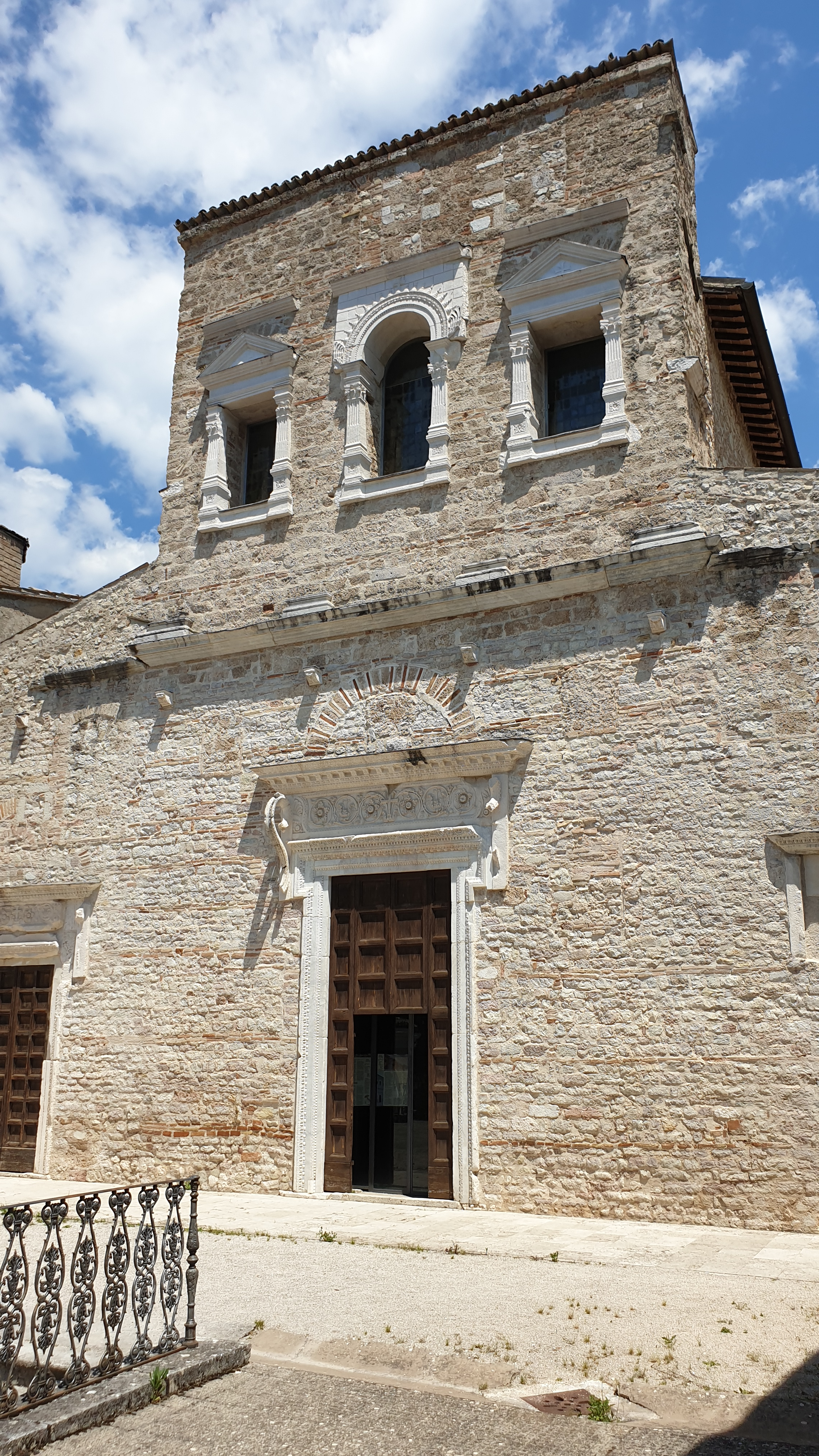
Basilica of San Salvatore

San Salvatore is a romanesque-style former basilica church located in the center of Spoleto, Province of Perugia, region of Umbria, Italy.

The Lombards' renovation of the church dates back to the eighth century, and it is testimony to the architectural style of the Langobardia Minor, "marking the transition from Antiquity to the European Middle Ages".

In 2011, the church building was declared a UNESCO world heritage property as part of the series of sites known as "Longobards in Italy: Places of Power (568–774 A.D.)", which comprises seven sites throughout Italy characterized by Lombard architecture, painting, sculpture, and art. San Salvatore is located in the monumental cemetery of Spoleto, on Ciciano hill, outside the medieval town walls. The cemetery was designed in 1836 by the architect Ireneo Aleandri.

== Gallery ==
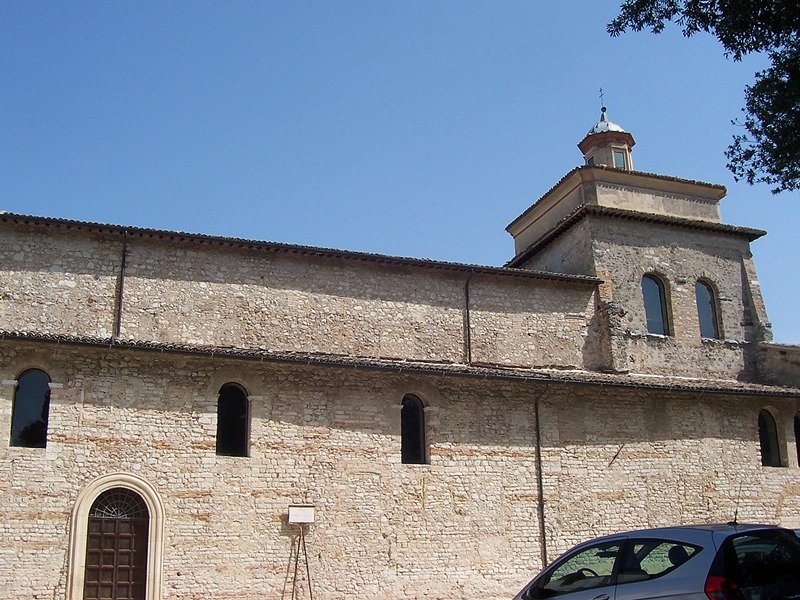
The exterior of the church

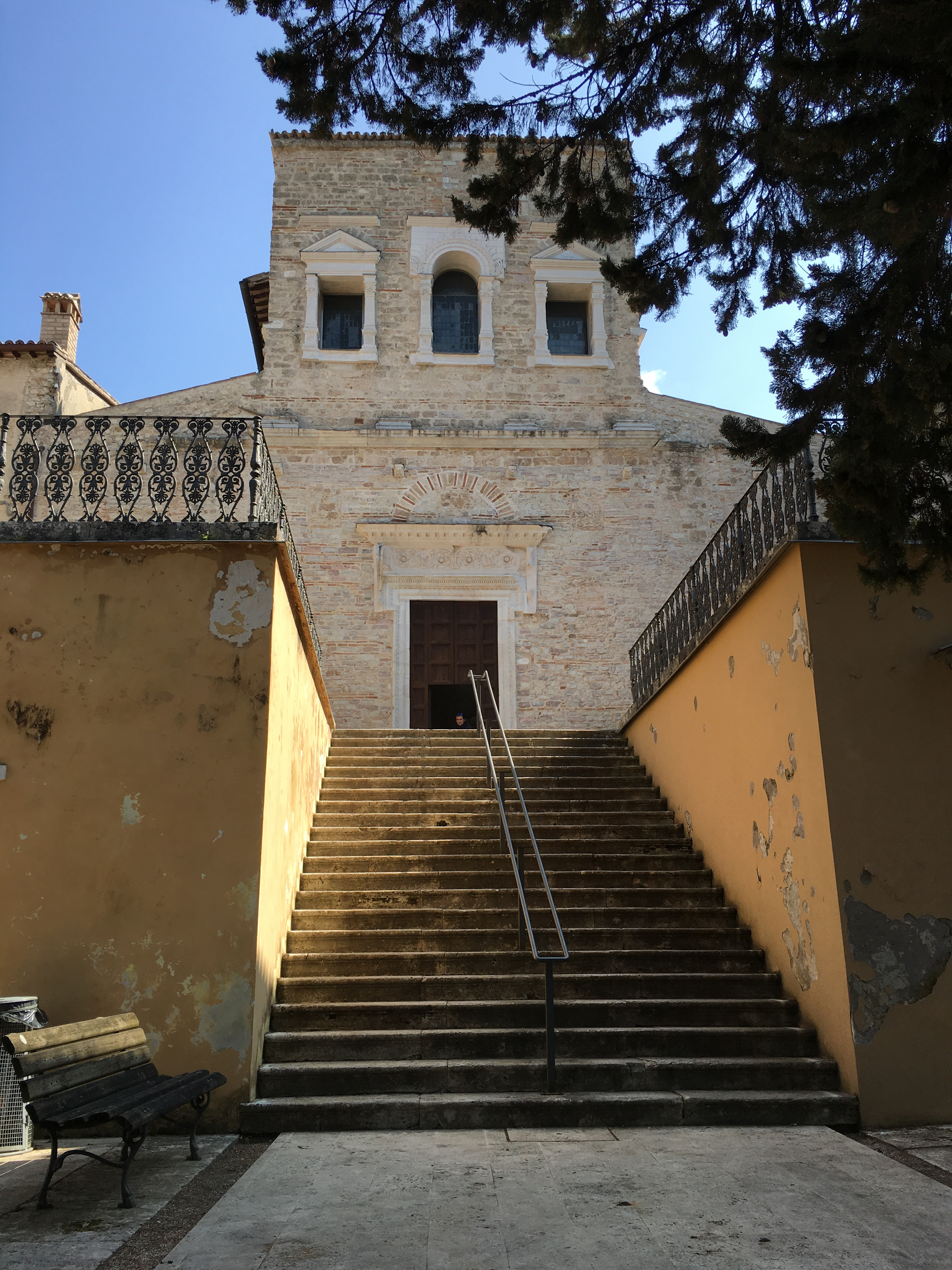
The main facade

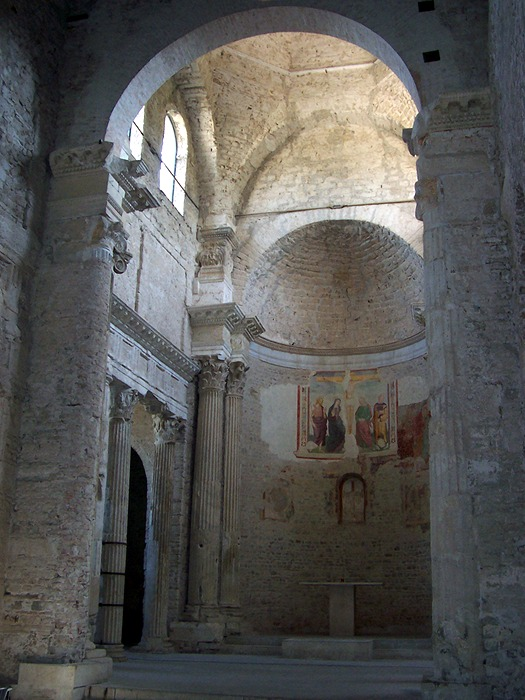
The interior of the church

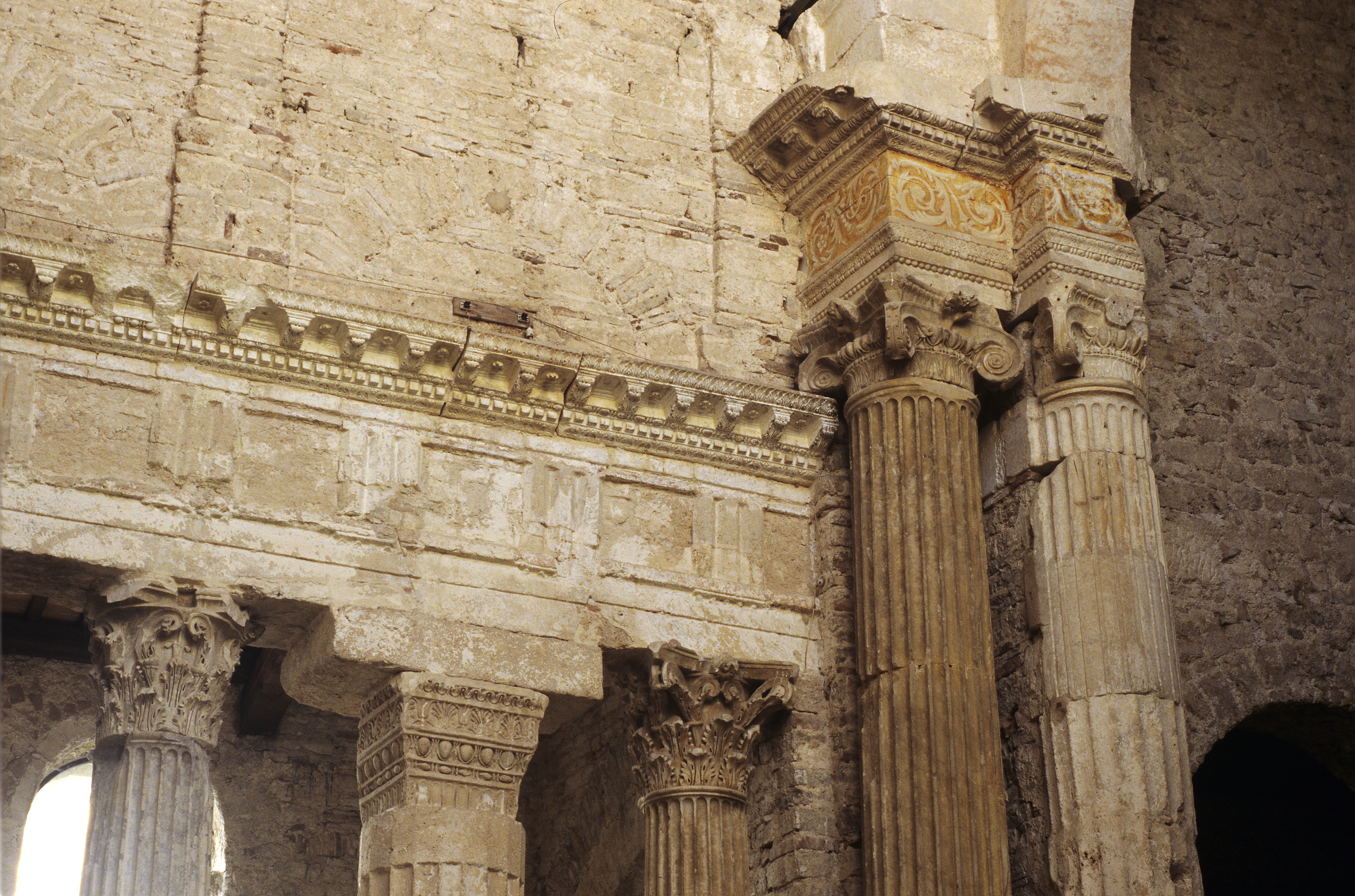
Detail of the architrave

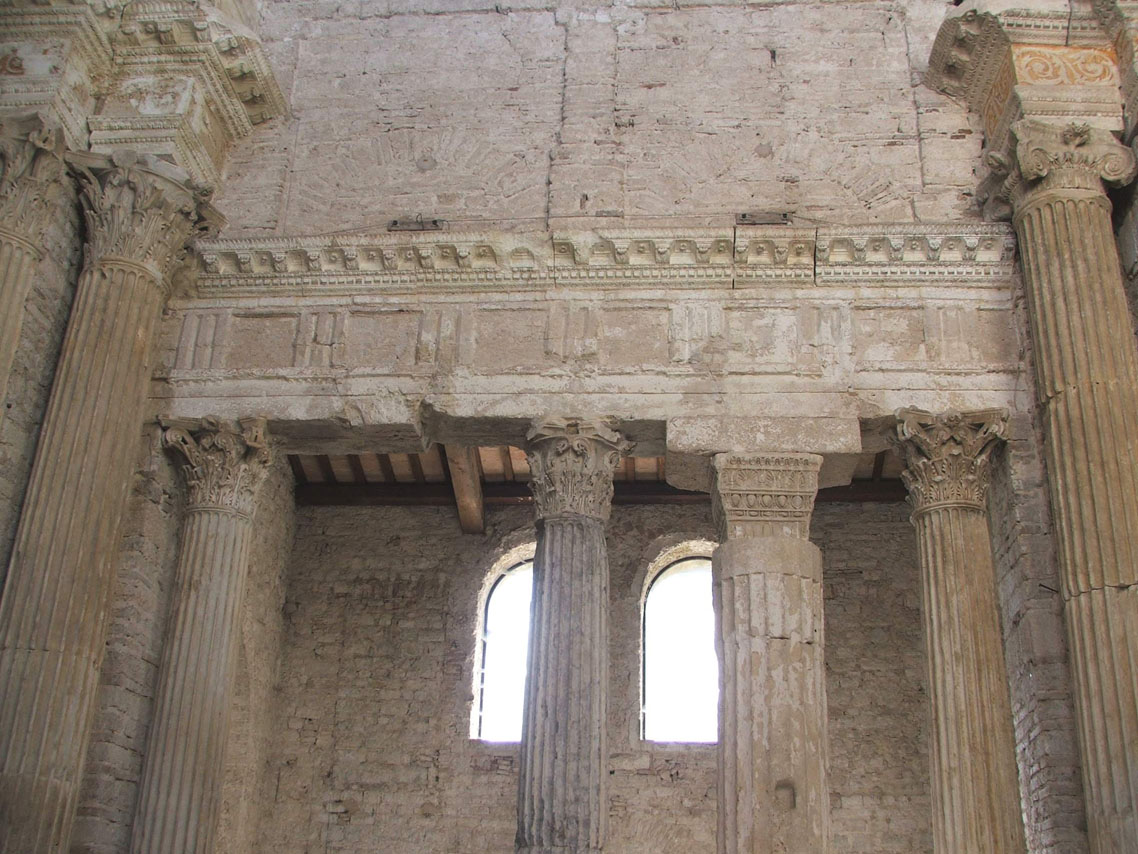
Detail of the interior

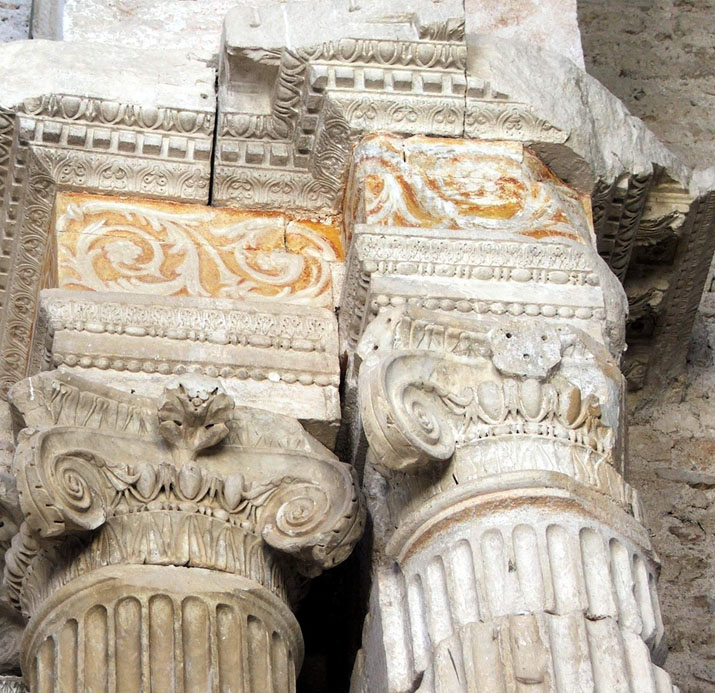
Detail of the capitals

== See also ==
Early medieval domes
