= Longobards in Italy: Places of Power (568–774 A.D.) =

Longobards in Italy. Places of the Power (568-774 A.D.)
UNESCO World Heritage Site
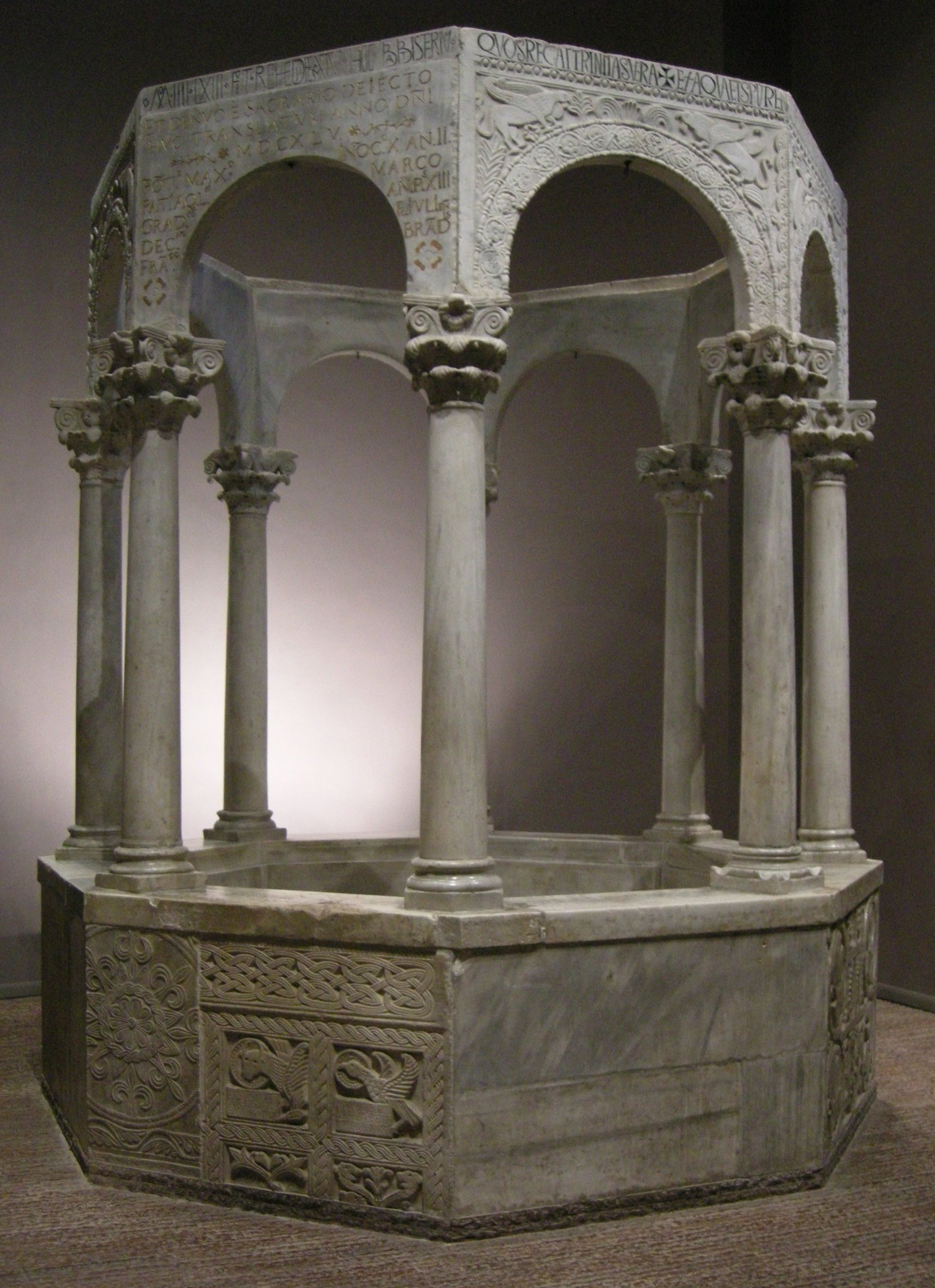
- Interactive map of Longobards in Italy. Places of the Power (568-774 A.D.)
- Location: Italy
- Includes: 1. The Gastaldaga area and the Episcopal complex 2. The monumental area with the monastic complex of San Salvatore-Santa Giulia; 3. The castrum with the Torba Tower and the church outside the walls, Santa Maria foris portas 4. The basilica of San Salvatore; 5. The Clitunno Tempietto; 6. The Santa Sofia complex 7. The Sanctuary of San Michele
- Criteria: Cultural: (ii)(iii)(vi)
- Reference: 1318
- Inscription: 2011 (35th Session)
- Area: 14.08 ha (34.8 acres)
- Buffer zone: 306.22 ha (756.7 acres)

Longobards in Italy: Places of Power (568–774 A.D.) (Italian: Longobardi in Italia: i luoghi del potere) is seven groups of historic buildings that reflect the achievements of the Germanic tribe of the Lombards (also referred to as Longobards), who settled in Italy during the sixth century and established a Lombard Kingdom which ended in 774 A.D.

The groups comprise monasteries, church buildings, and fortresses and became UNESCO World Heritage Sites in June 2011 as they testify "to the Lombards' major role in the spiritual and cultural development of Medieval European Christianity".

== Gastaldaga area and Episcopal complex at Cividale ==
The Gastaldaga area and the Episcopal complex at Cividale del Friuli (Province of Udine) includes:

- Area of the Gastaldaga, with the small Longobard temple. The small temple, which is currently the Oratory of Santa Maria in Valle, is the most important and the best preserved architectural testimony to the Longobard era. This is particularly important as it marks the coexistence of purely Longobard motives (as seen in the Fregi, for example) and is a revival of the classic models, creating a sort of refined uninterrupted continuation between classic art, Longobard art and Carolingian and Ottonian art.
- Episcopal complex which includes the remains of the Patriarch's Palace in the lower level of the National Archaeological Museum. The Callisto patriarch Episcopal complex is the main religious complex in the powerful Duchy of Friuli's capital and includes the basilica, the San Giovanni Battista baptistery and the Patriarchal palace. The archaeological excavations only show a few traces of architectural work, but have allowed the recovery of some of the most refined artefacts and Longobard sculpture, such as the Baptismal Font of Patriarch Callisto and the Altar of Duke Rachis.
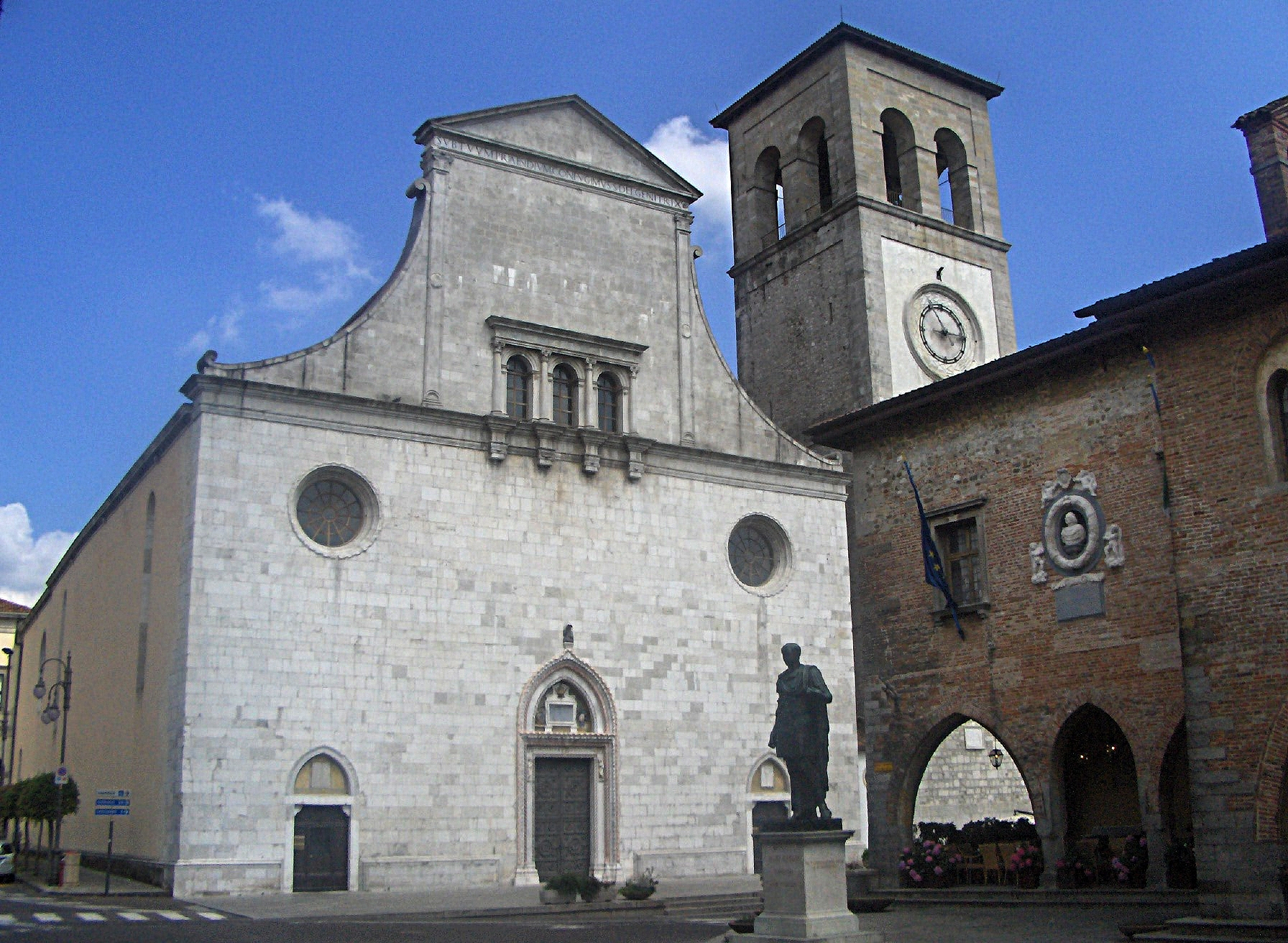
The façade of the Cathedral.

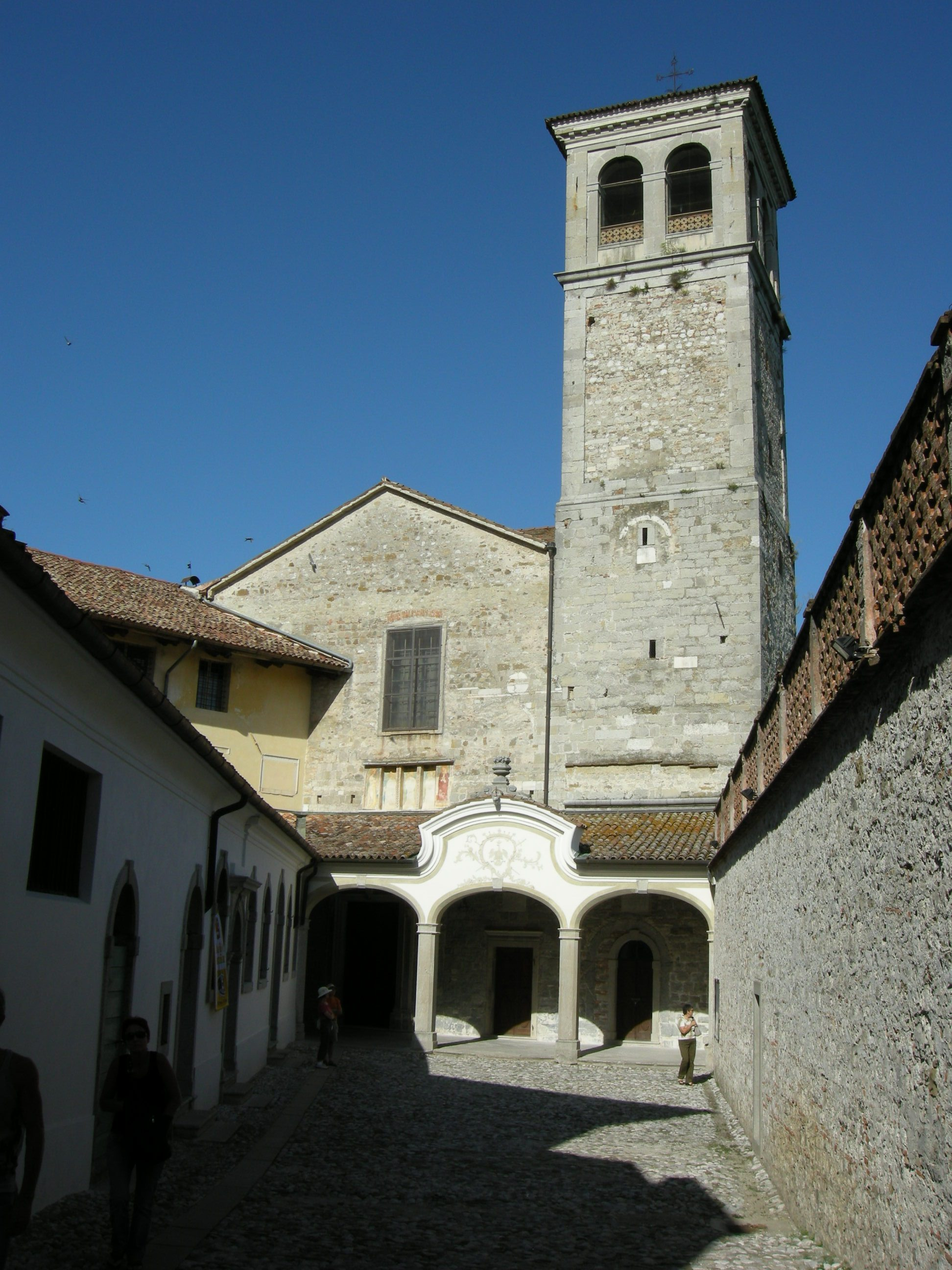
Church of Santa Maria in Valle in the Gastaldaga area.

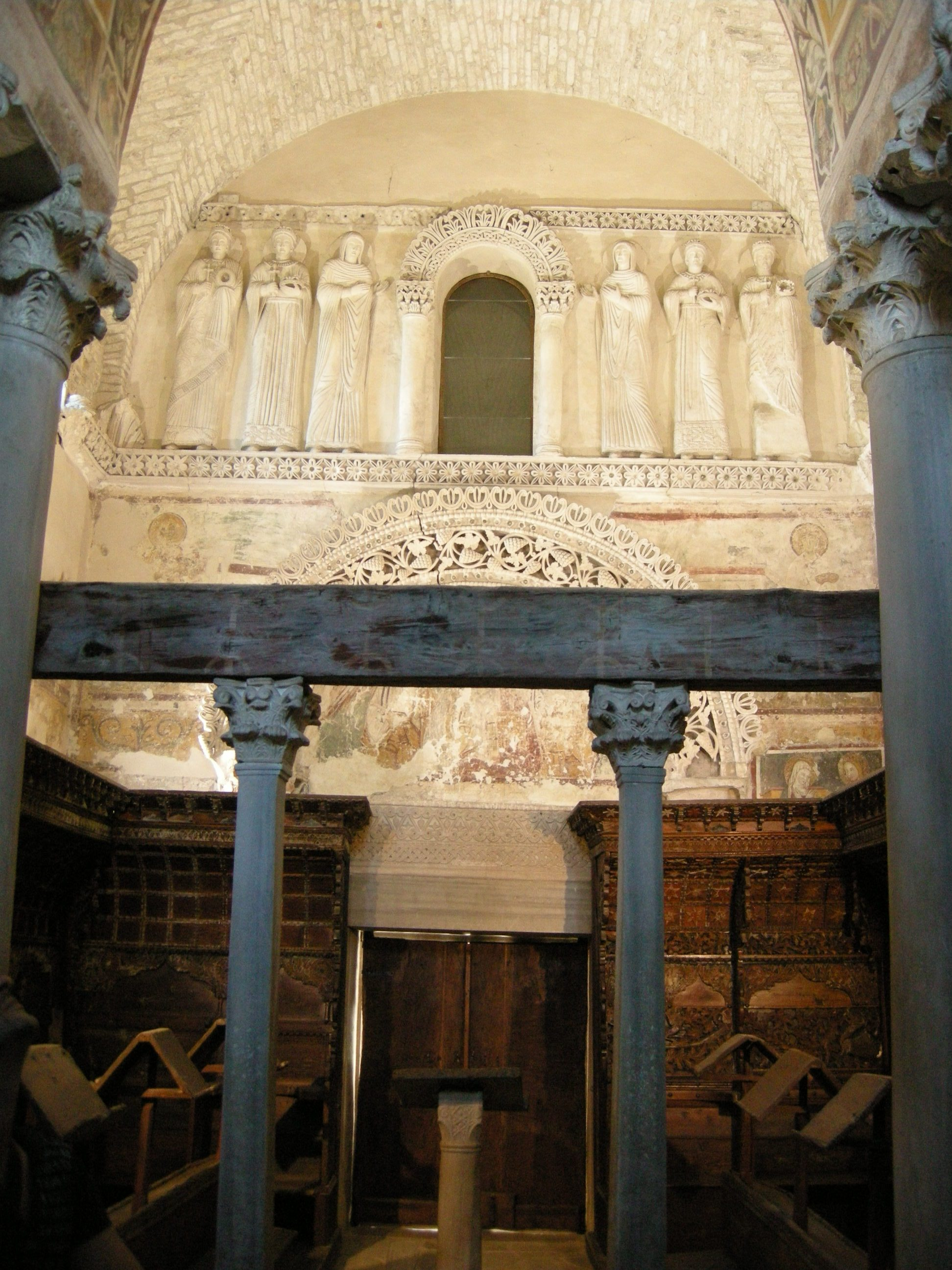
The Tempietto Longobardo.

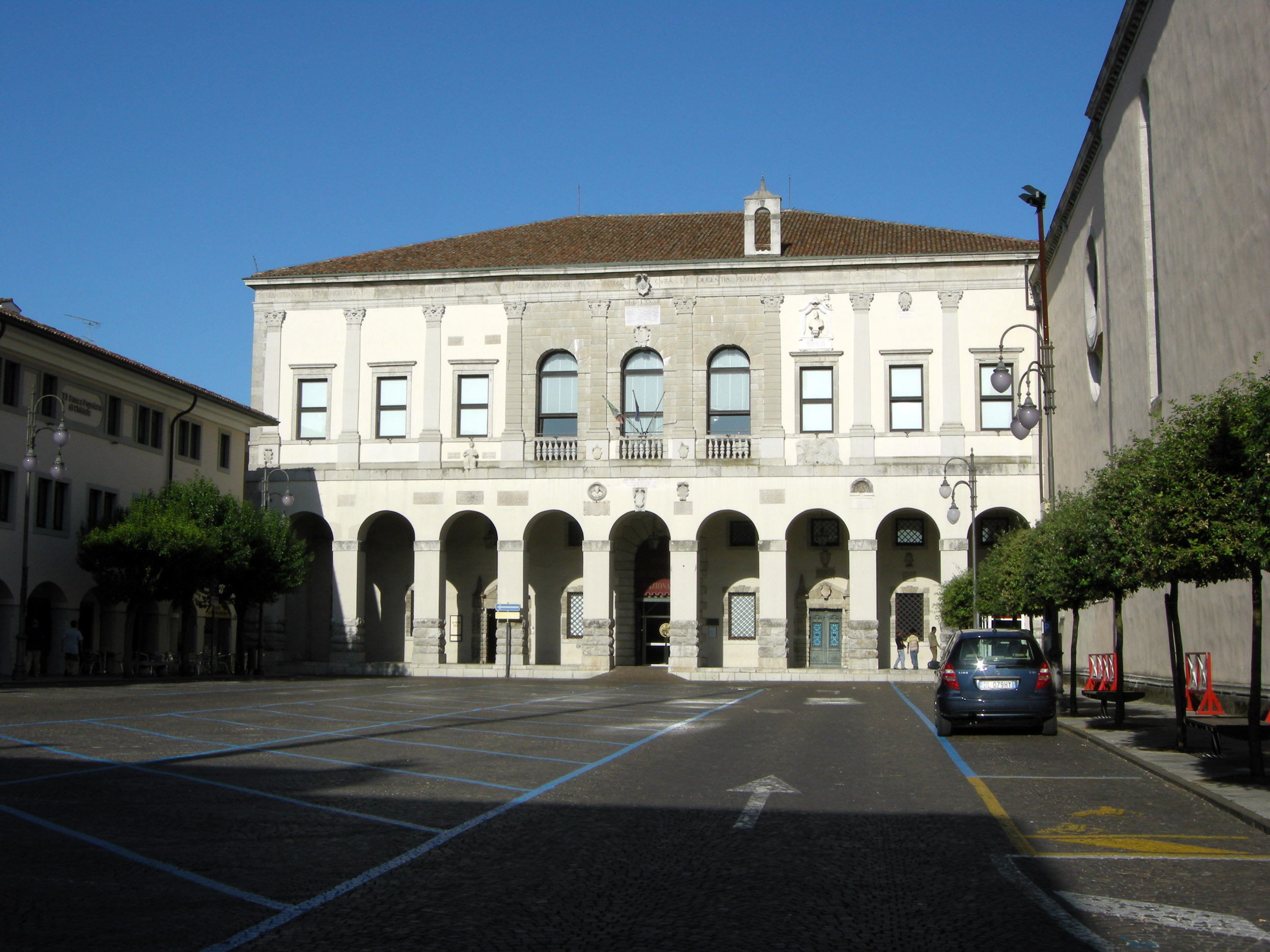
The palladian Palazzo Pretorio in the Episcopal complex.

== Monumental area with monastic complex of San Salvatore-Santa Giulia at Brescia ==
The monumental area with the monastic complex of San Salvatore-Santa Giulia at Brescia includes the convent of Santa Giulia as well as the basilica of San Salvatore and the Roman Forum archaeological area.

Founded in 753 as a church for the convent by Desiderius, the Duke of Brescia and future king of the Longobards, and his wife Ansa, the convent of San Salvatore, characterised by the contemporary use of Longobard style and classic and ornate decorative motifs, is one of the better examples of Early Medieval religious architecture. Over the centuries it was modified many times and became part of the new Conventual complex, whose Church, dedicated to Santa Giulia, was finished in 1599.

To the west of the monastic complex is the monumental area consisting of the Capitolium, the republican sanctuary and the Roman theatre, closely linked with the stories about San Salvatore-Santa Giulia. The oldest religious building of the Roman forum dates back to the end of the first century BC. The exceptional level of conservation of the architectural and decorative aspects makes this archaeological area a unique example in northern Italy.

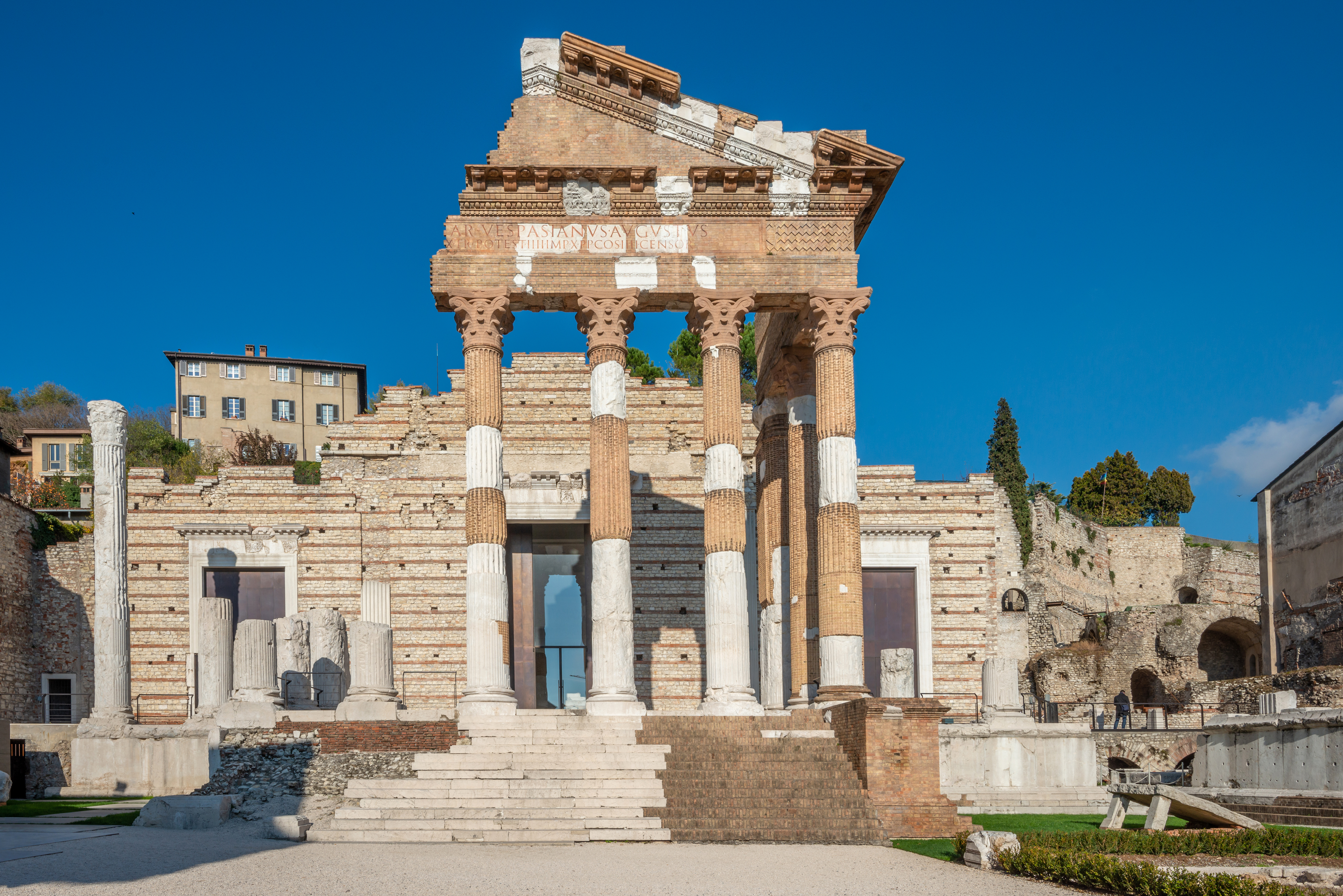
The Capitolium in the monumental area of the Roman forum.

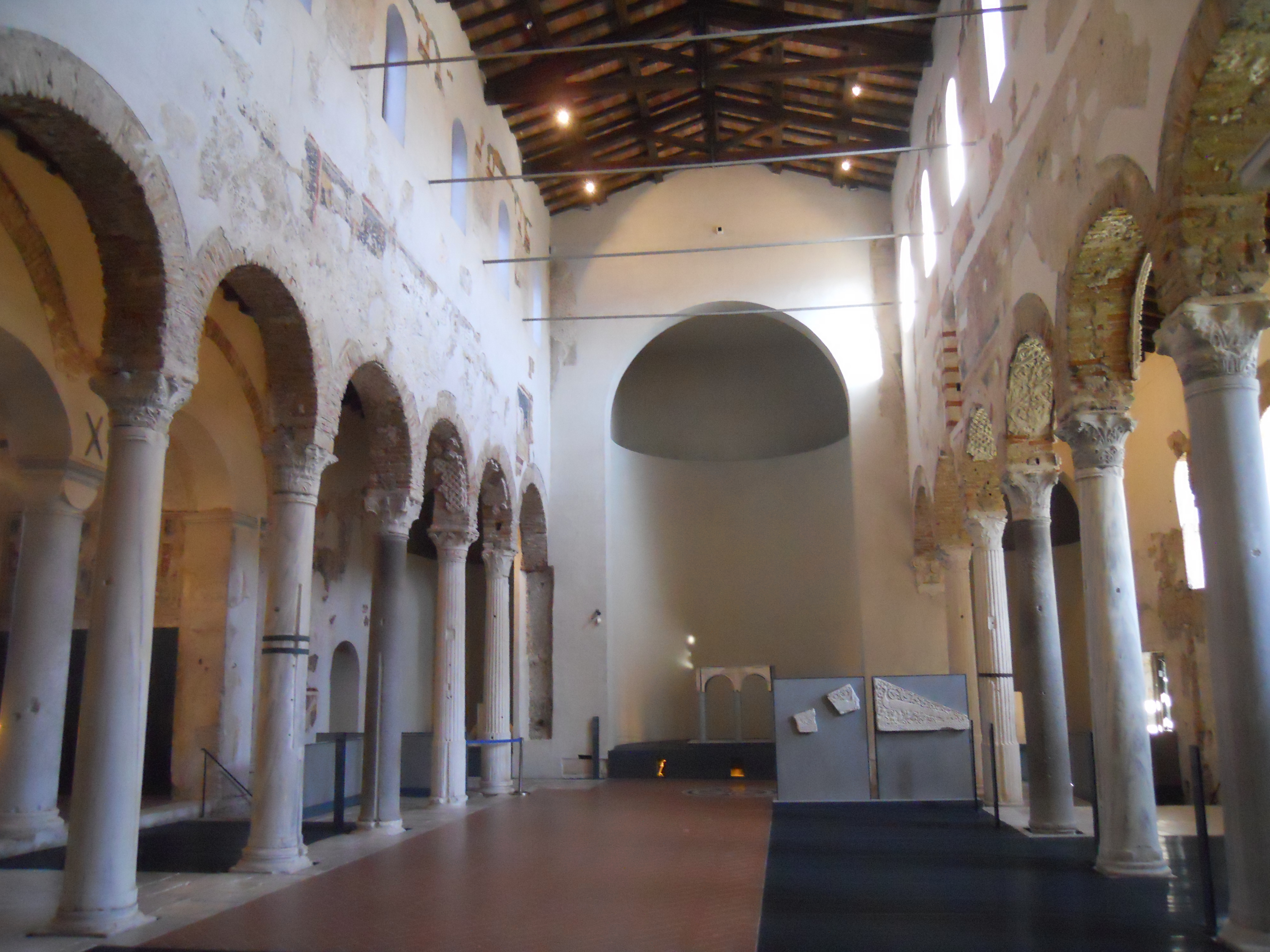
Basilica of San Salvatore.

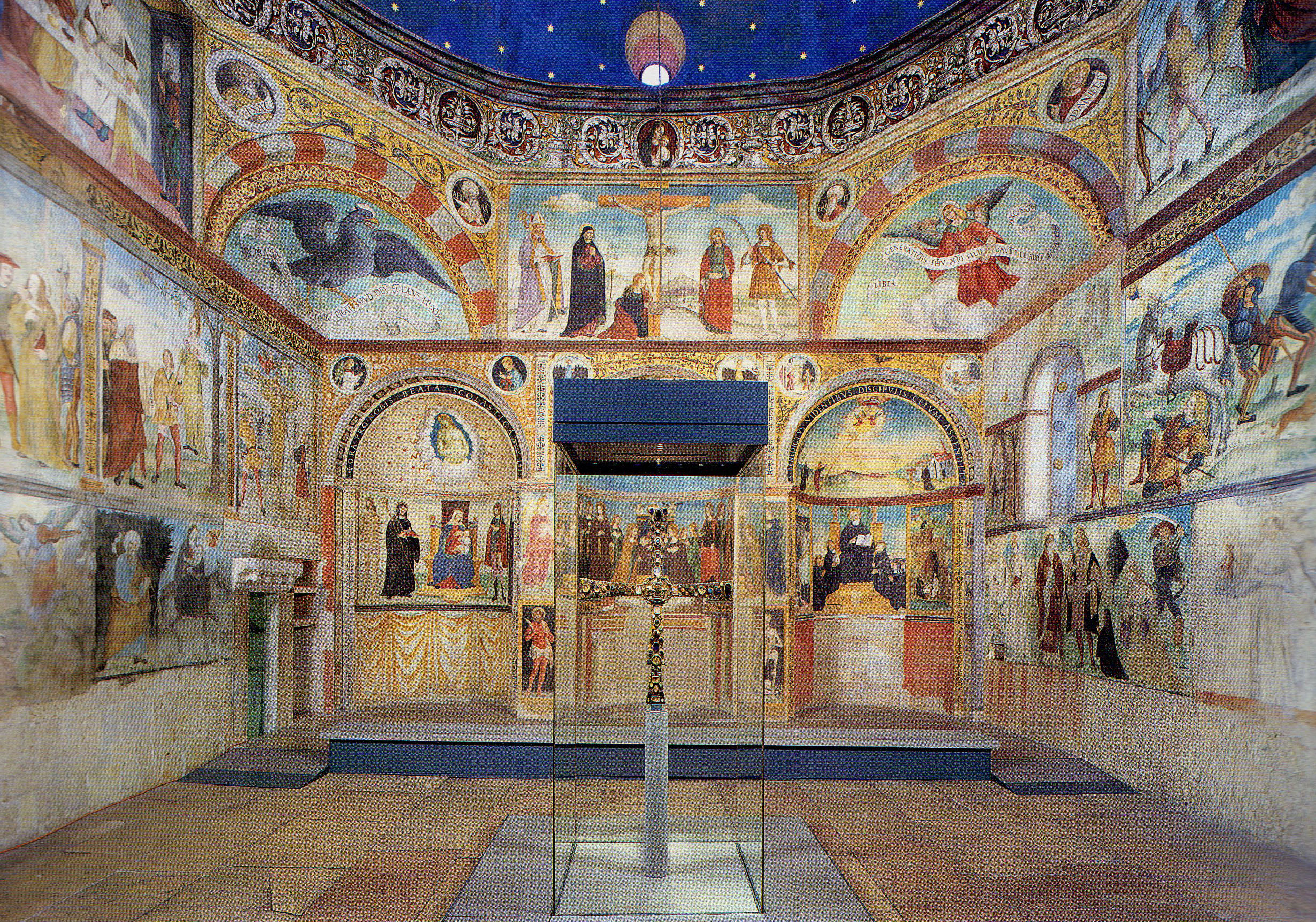
Church of Santa Maria in Solario.

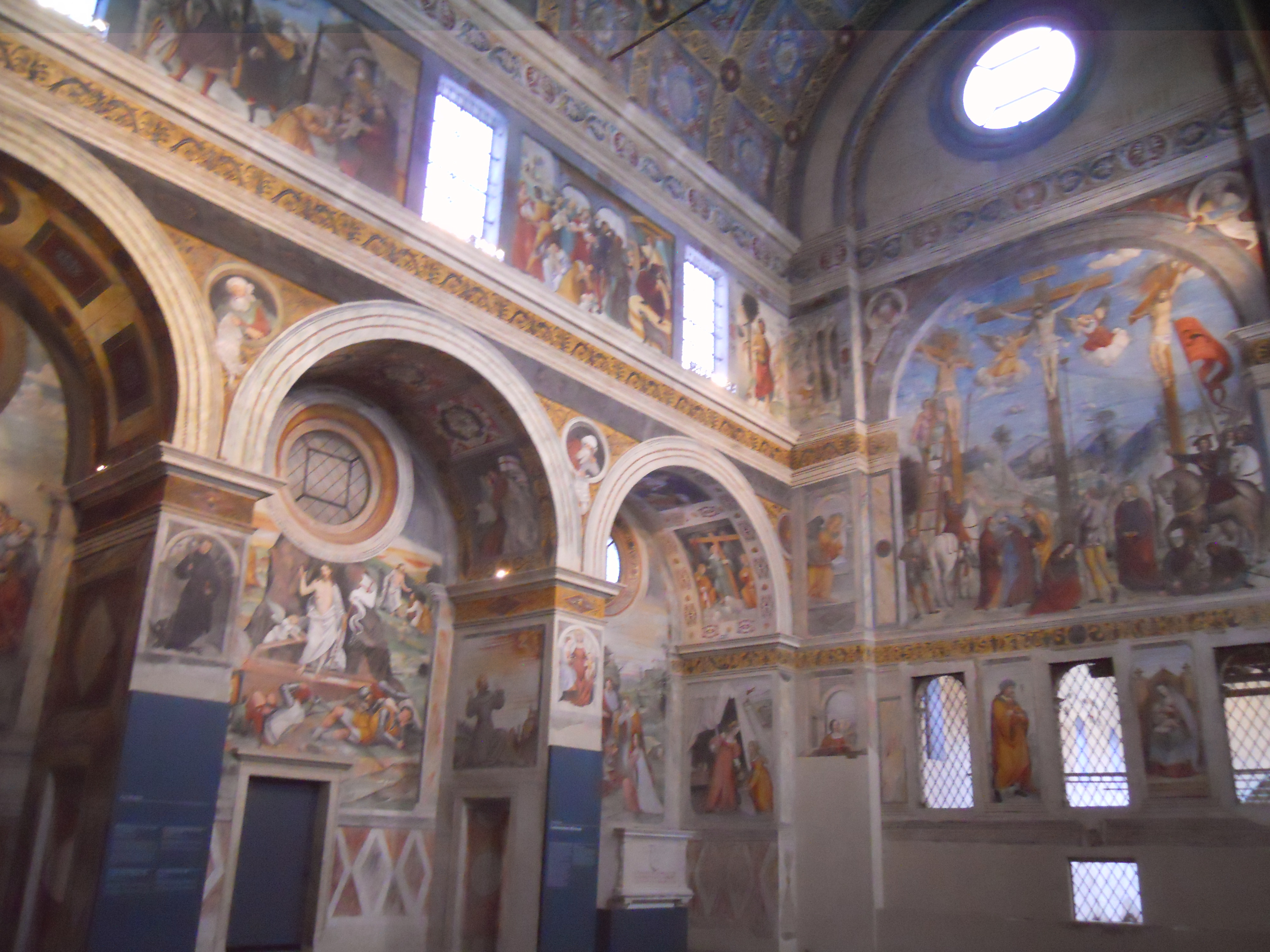
The nun's choir of the monastery of San Salvatore-Santa Giulia.

== Castrum with Torba Tower and church outside the walls, Santa Maria foris portas, at Castelseprio ==
The castrum with the Torba Tower and the church outside the walls at Castelseprio (Province of Varese) includes the Torba Monastery, the Santa Maria foris portas church with its frescoes, and the ruins of the San Giovanni Evangelistic basilica. The Longobards turned the Castelseprio Castrum, which was previously a Roman military outpost and an Ostrogoth defensive bastion, firstly into a place for commerce and then into a monastery (8th century).

The monastery includes the tower, built by the Ostrogoths and re-adapted for monastic purposes by the Longobards, and also the little church named after the Virgin Mary. Only the ruins of the big Castelseprio Basilica remain, three naves with a central apse and absidium, however the Santa Maria foris portas has remained intact, including large parts of its apsidal frescoes, which are some of the largest murial paintings found from the entire period of the Early Middle Ages.

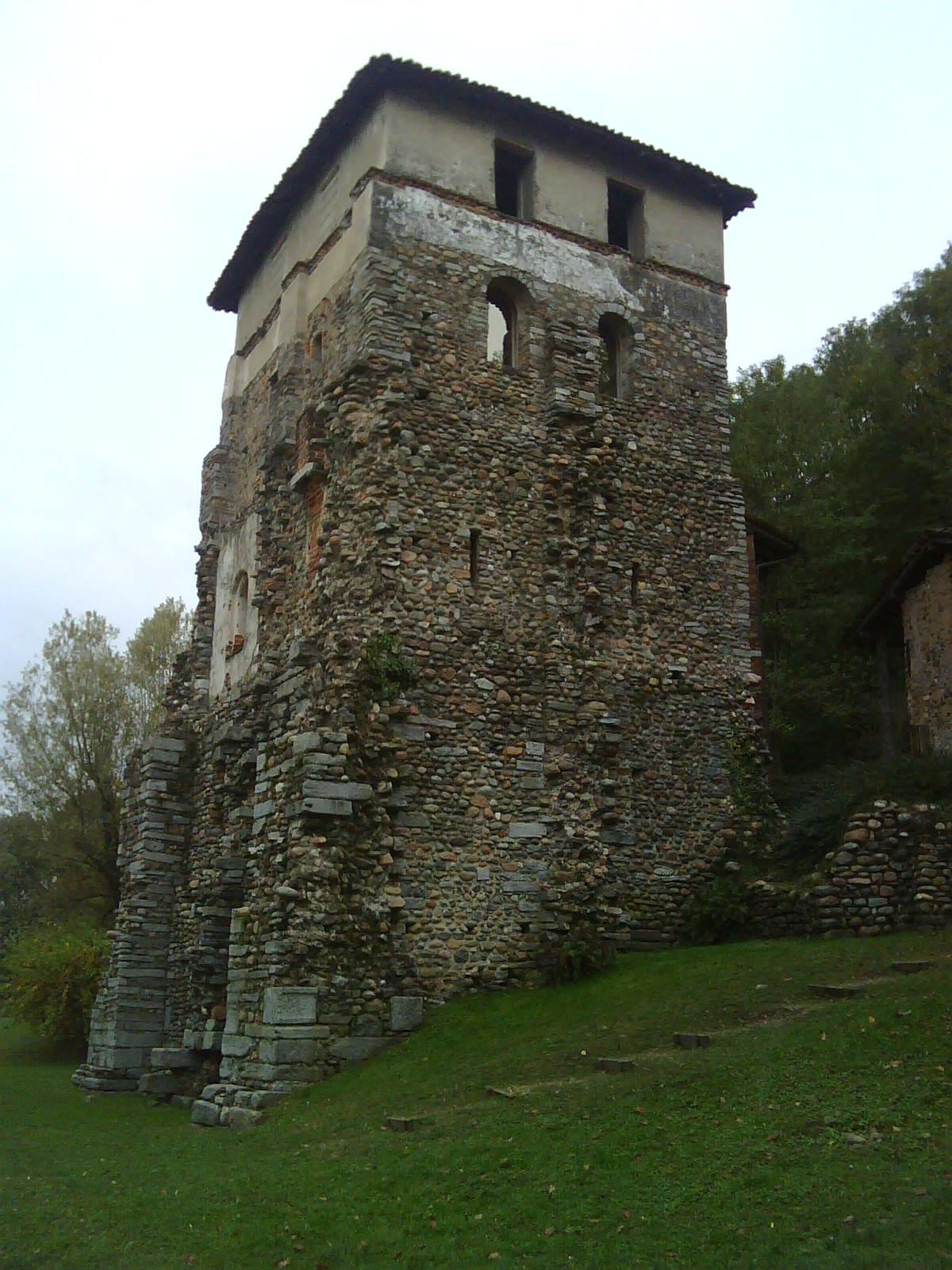
The Torba Tower.

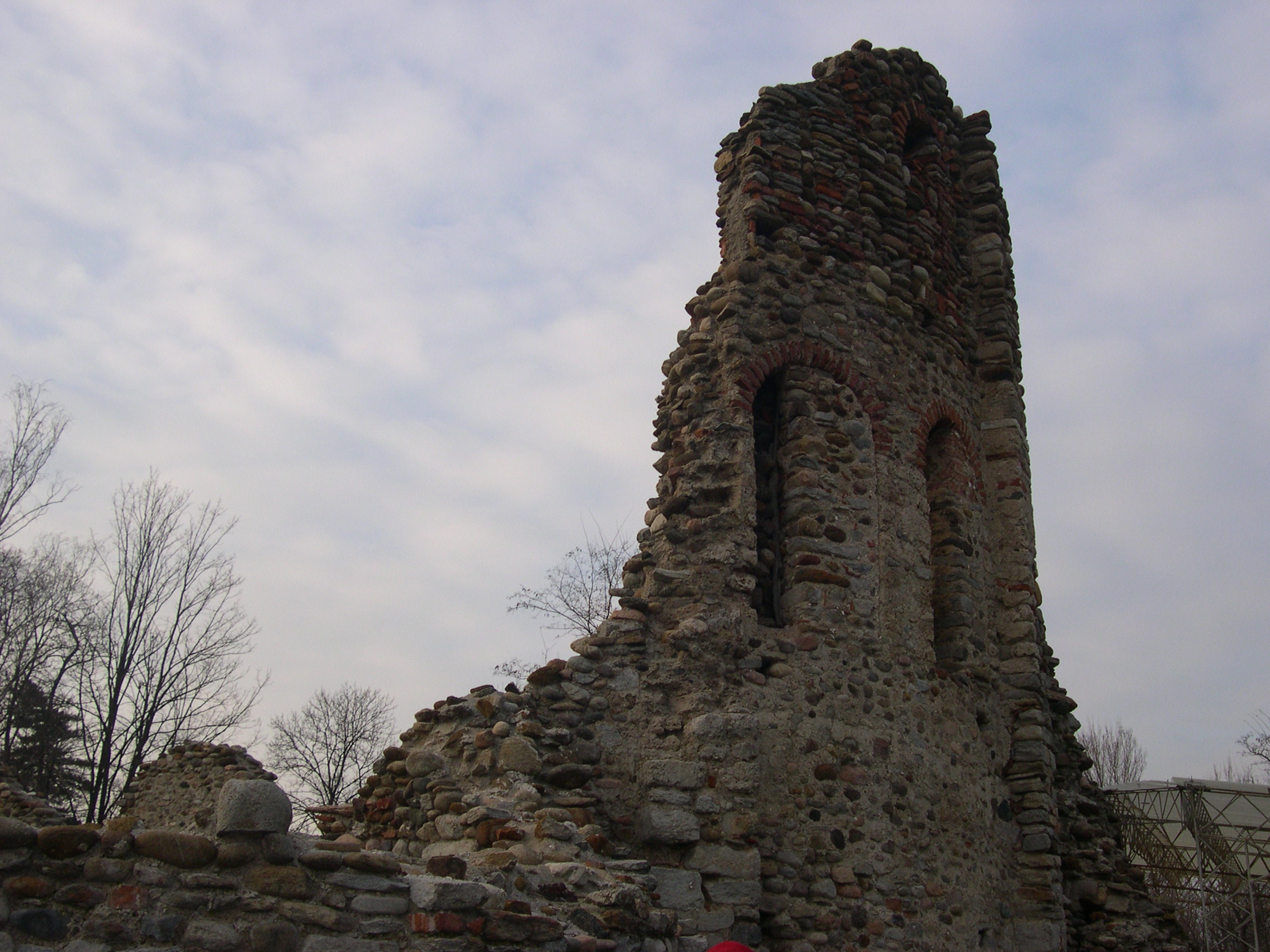
Remains of the basilica of San Giovanni Evangelista.

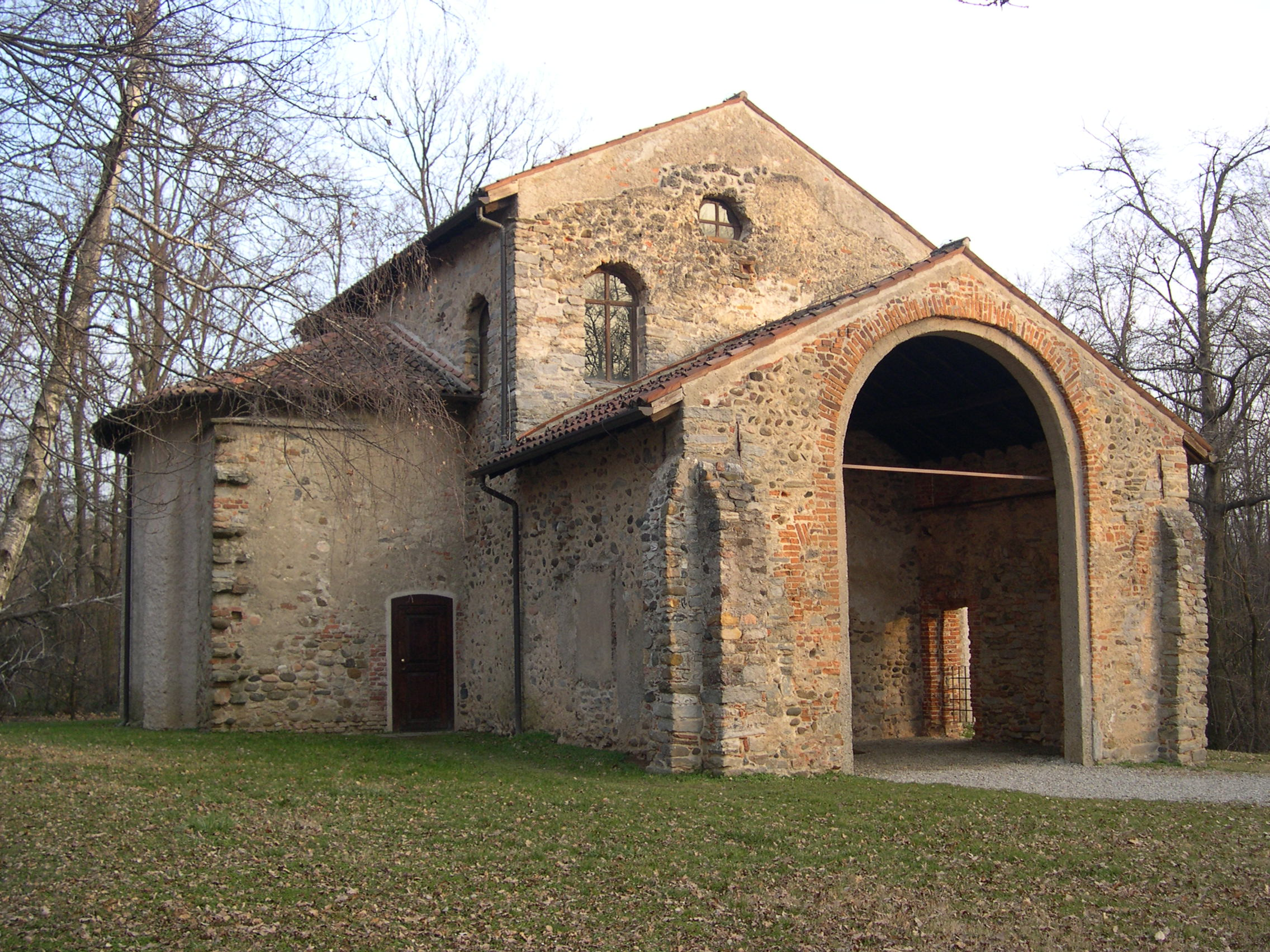
Church of Santa Maria foris portas.

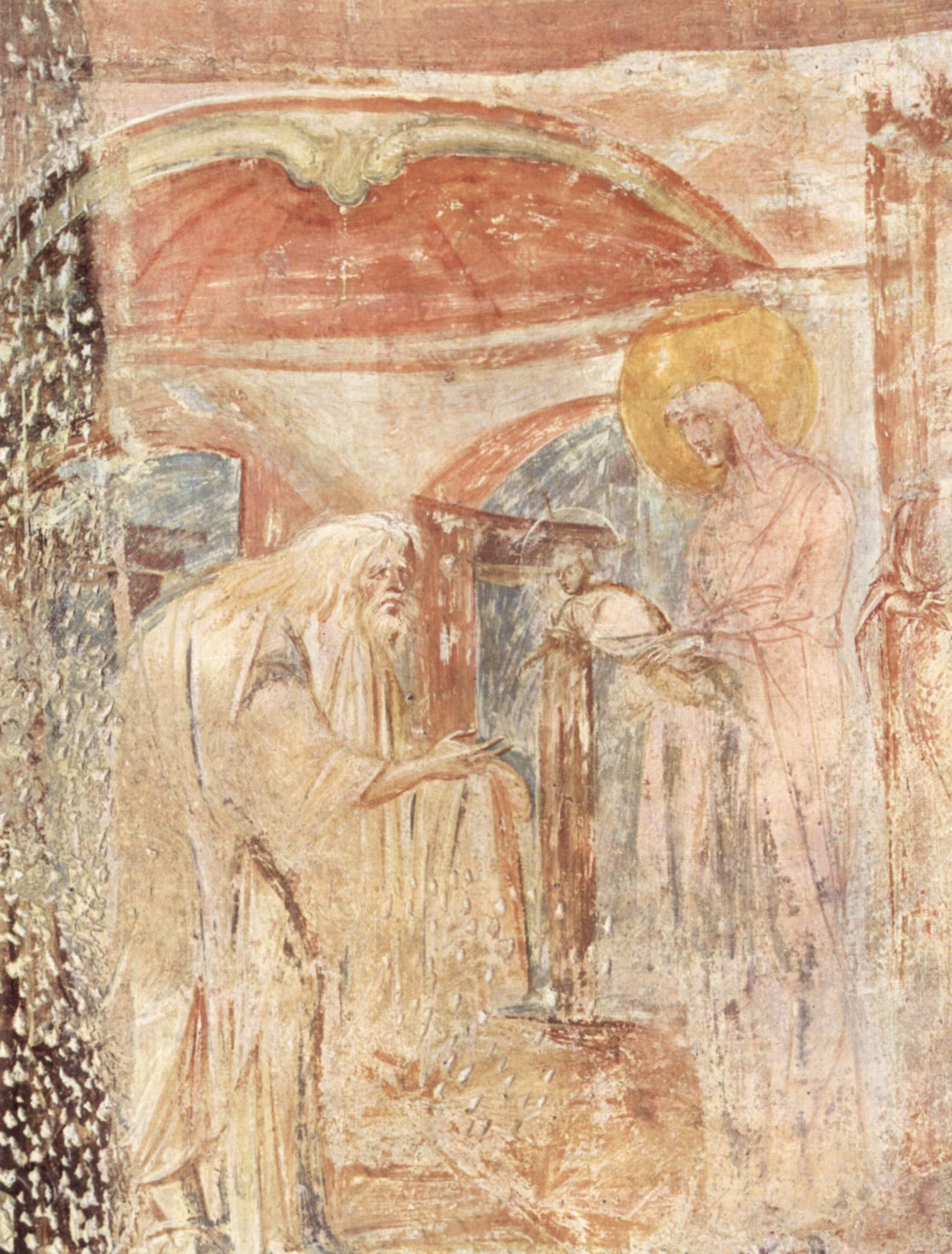
Santa Maria foris portas, detail of the frescoes.

== Basilica of San Salvatore at Spoleto ==
The basilica of San Salvatore at Spoleto (Province of Perugia) was an Early Christian basilica from the 4th-5th century, on which the Longobards carried out extensive renovations during the 8th century. The basilica was built with three naves: also the chancel is tripartite and it is covered by a vault with an octagonal base. The apse is a semicircle and is closed off on the outside by a straight wall. At either side of the flank are two apse areas with a ribbed vault. The inside has lost its original decorations of stuccos and paintings, but preserves a rich entablature with Doric frieze, set on Doric and Corinthian columns. On the original 8th century facade, marked by lesenes and divided in to two sections from one corner, only the corners of the windows and the three portals sculpted with classic motifs have managed to be preserved.

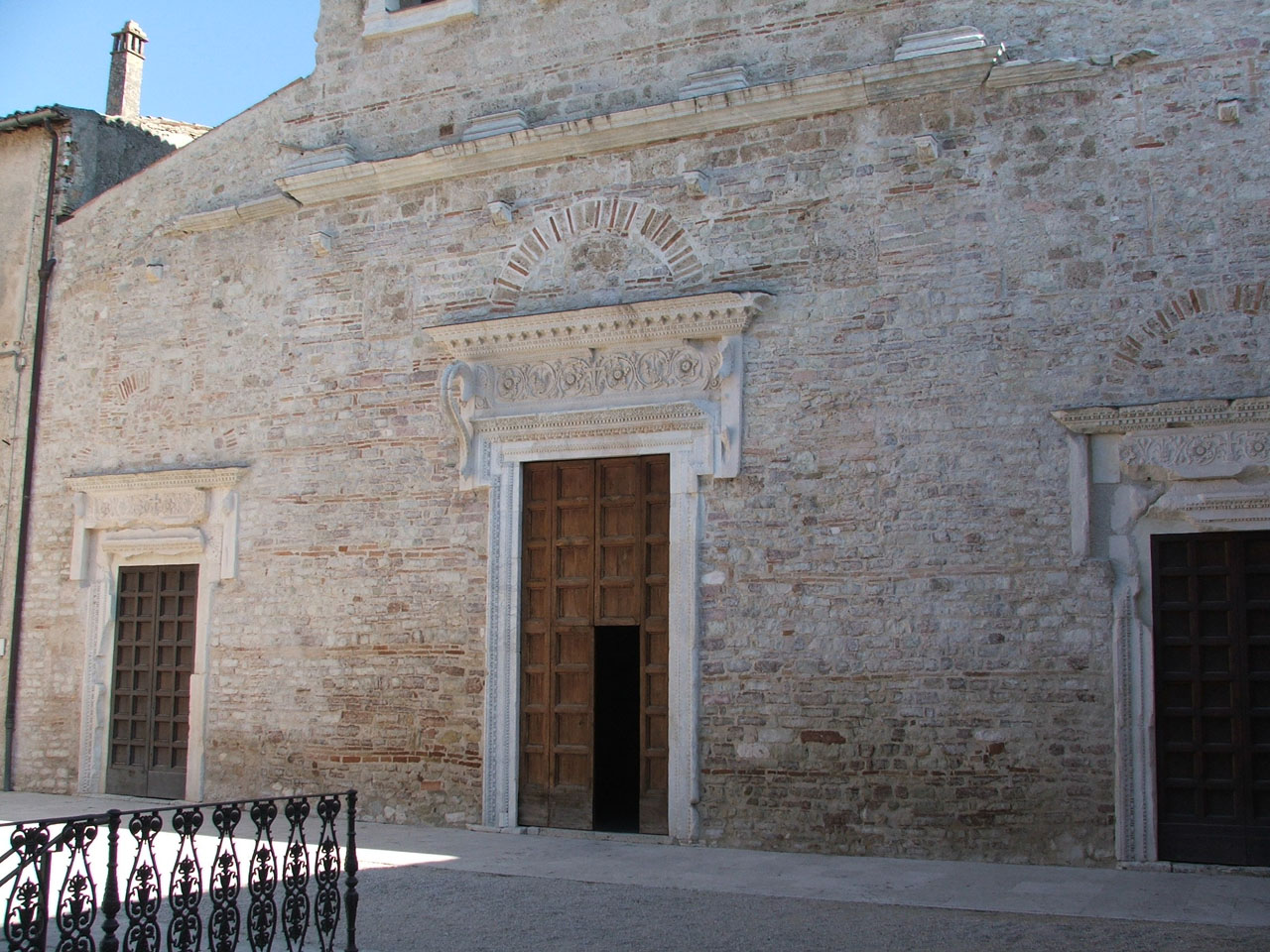
The façade of the basilica of San Salvatore.

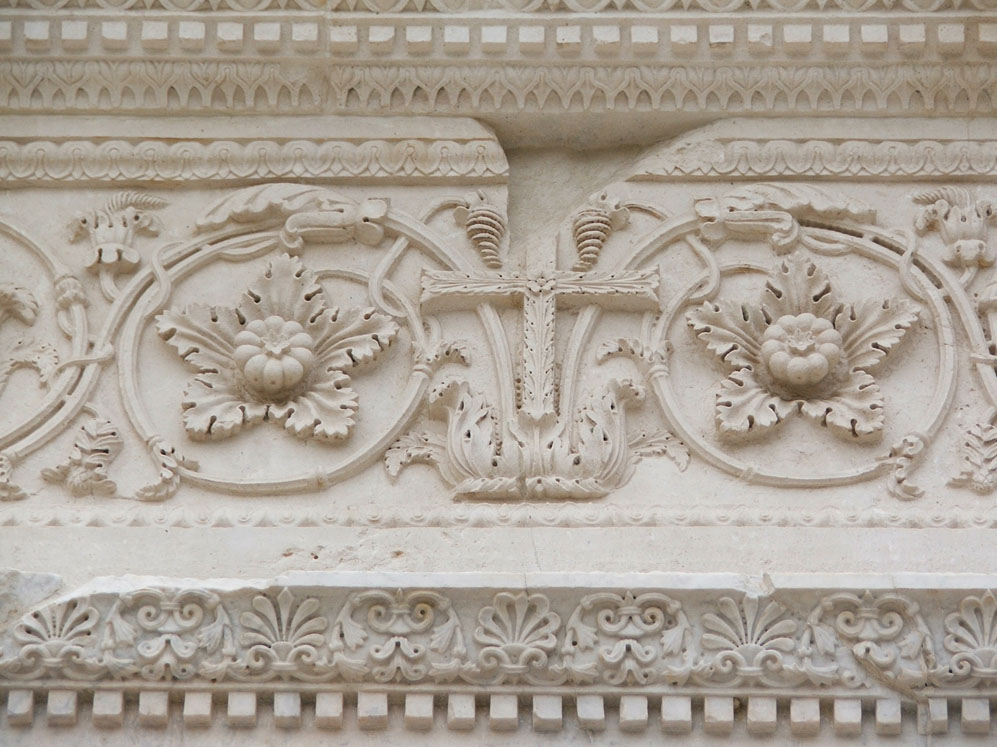
Detail of the portal.

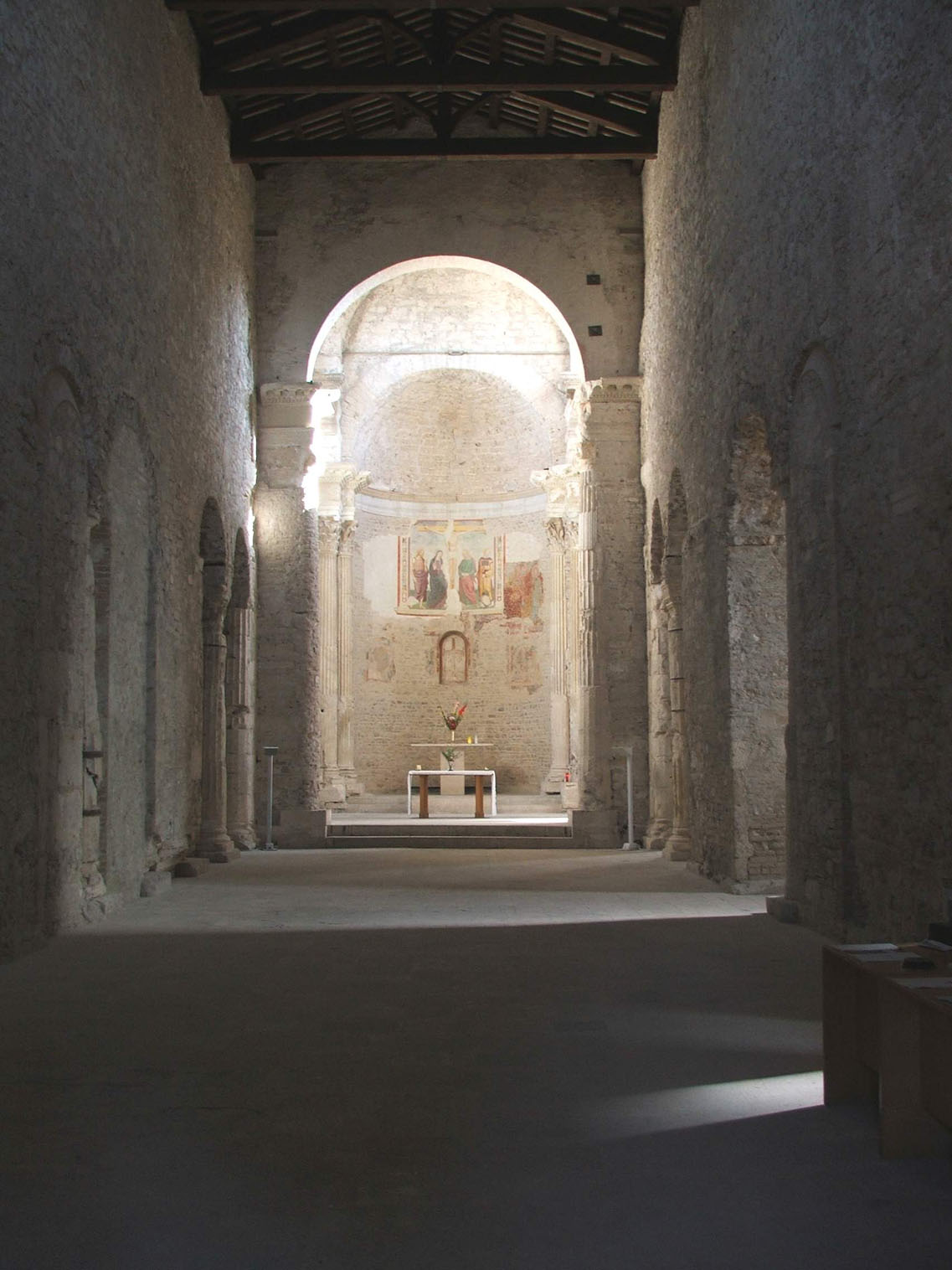
Internal view of the basilica.

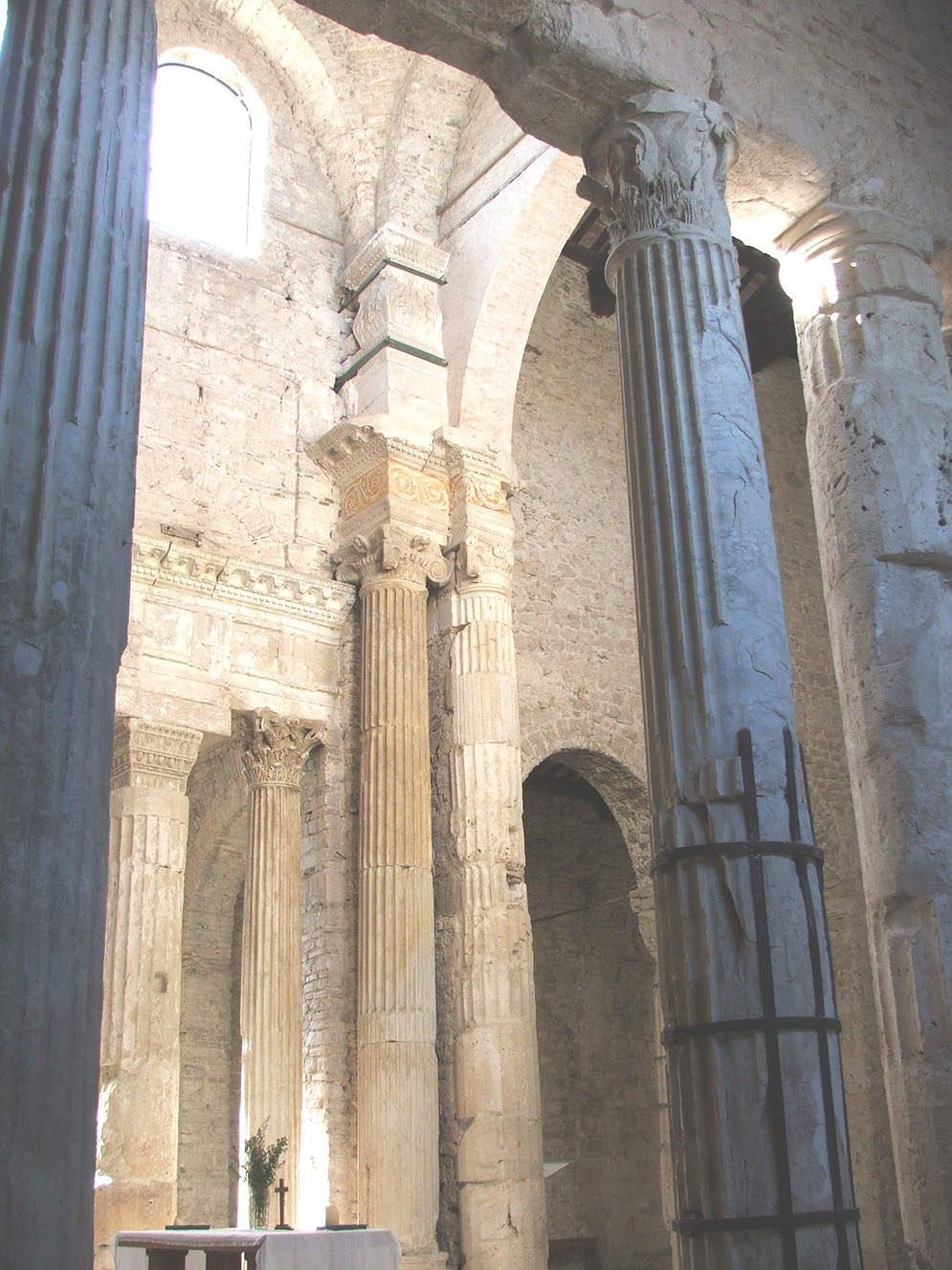
The presbytery.

== Clitunno Tempietto at Campello sul Clitunno ==
The Clitunno Tempietto in Campello sul Clitunno (Province of Perugia) is a small church dedicated to San Salvatore, in the form of an Ancient Greek style Corinthian temple. The constructors had probably re-used remains from an ancient Pagan sacellum as well as spolia material – however, most of the sculpted ornaments are original creations and haven't been made out of re-used materials from the Roman age. On the architrave there are square Roman square capitals inscribed on the north, south and west sides – a rare example of monumental Early Medieval epigraphy. The inside consists of a large room, covered by a barrel vault and with an aedicula which frames the bottom apse. There are also frescoes from the 7th century.

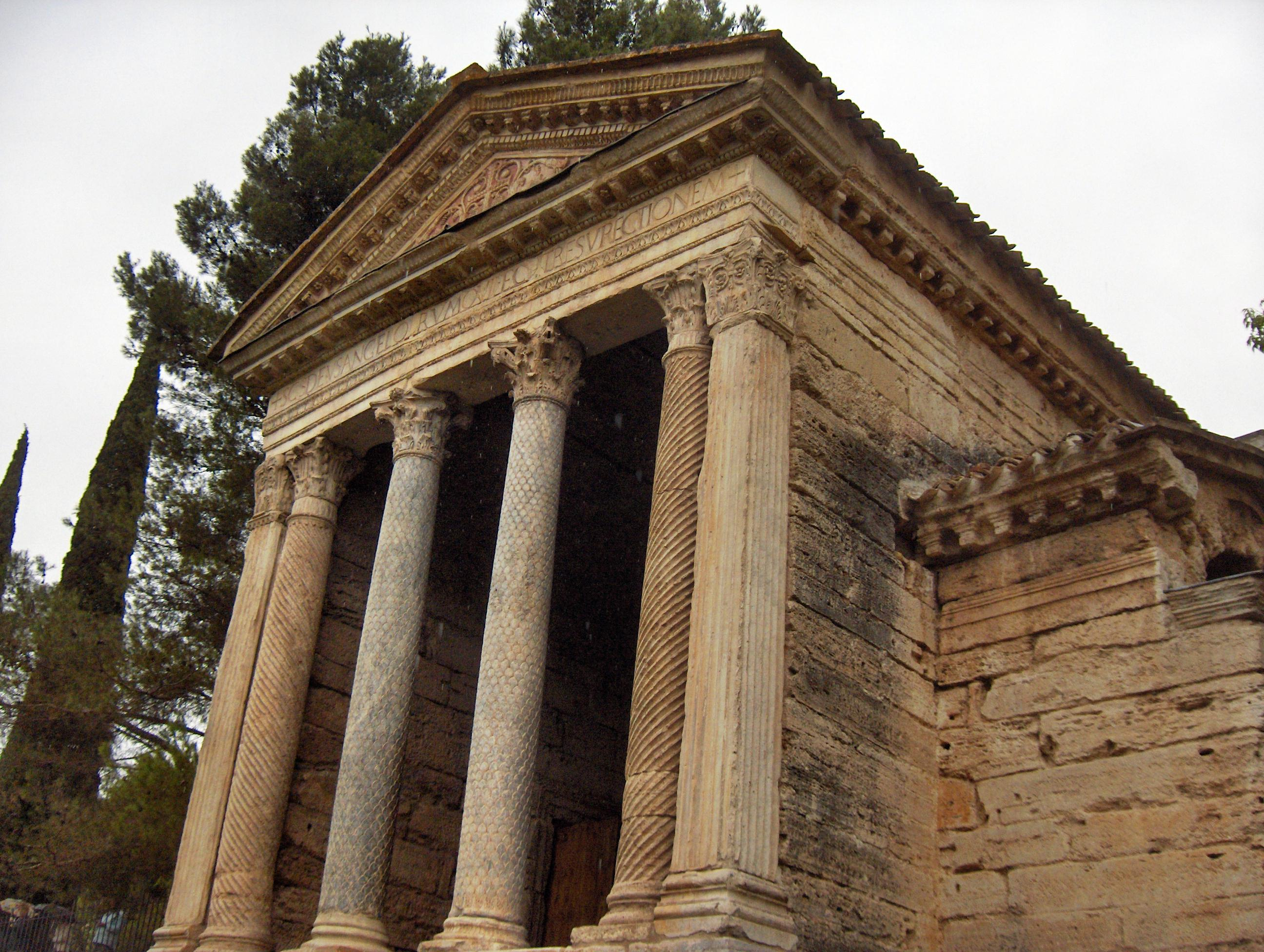
The façade of the Clitunno Tempietto.

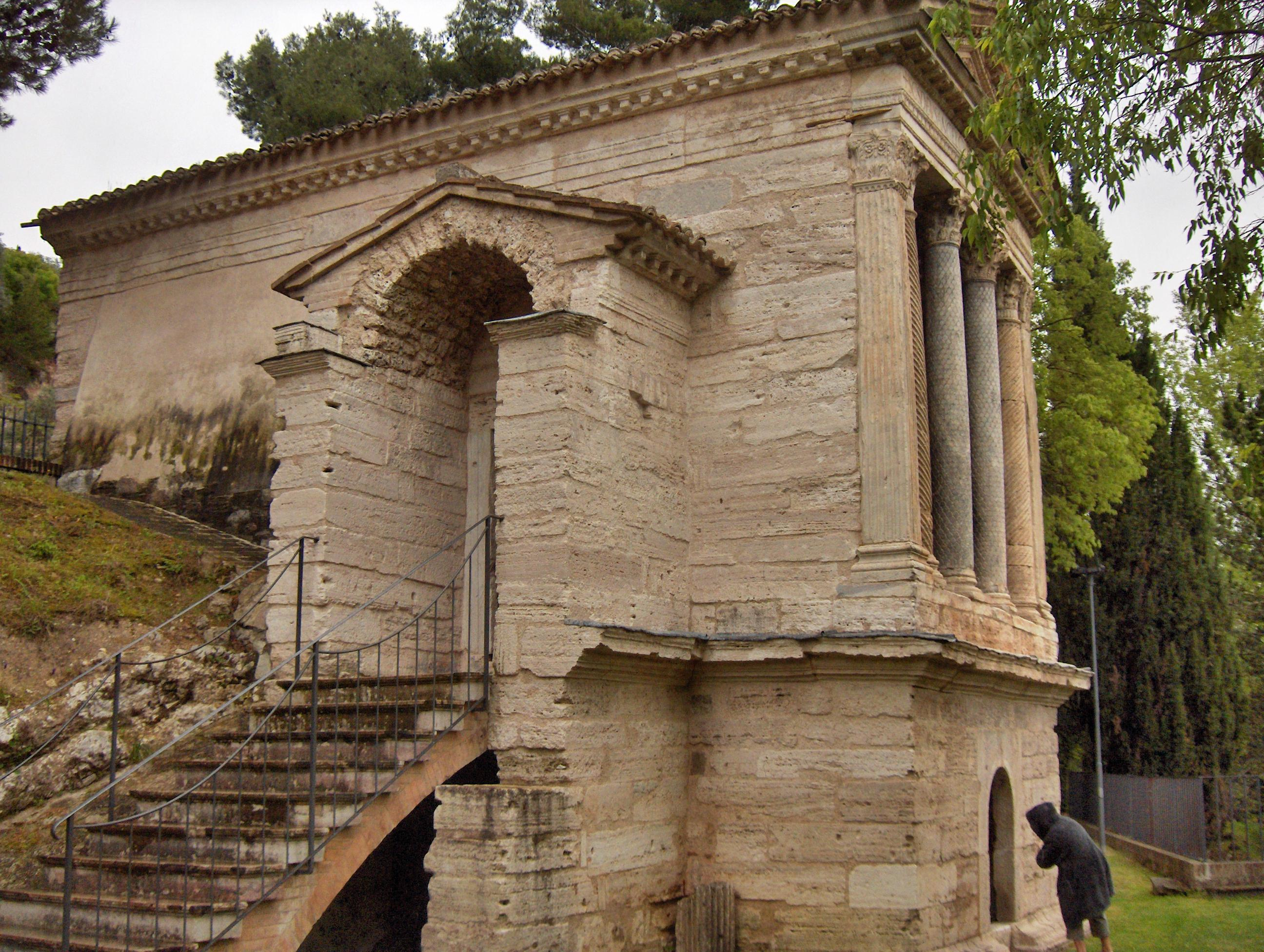
Lateral view of the Tempietto.

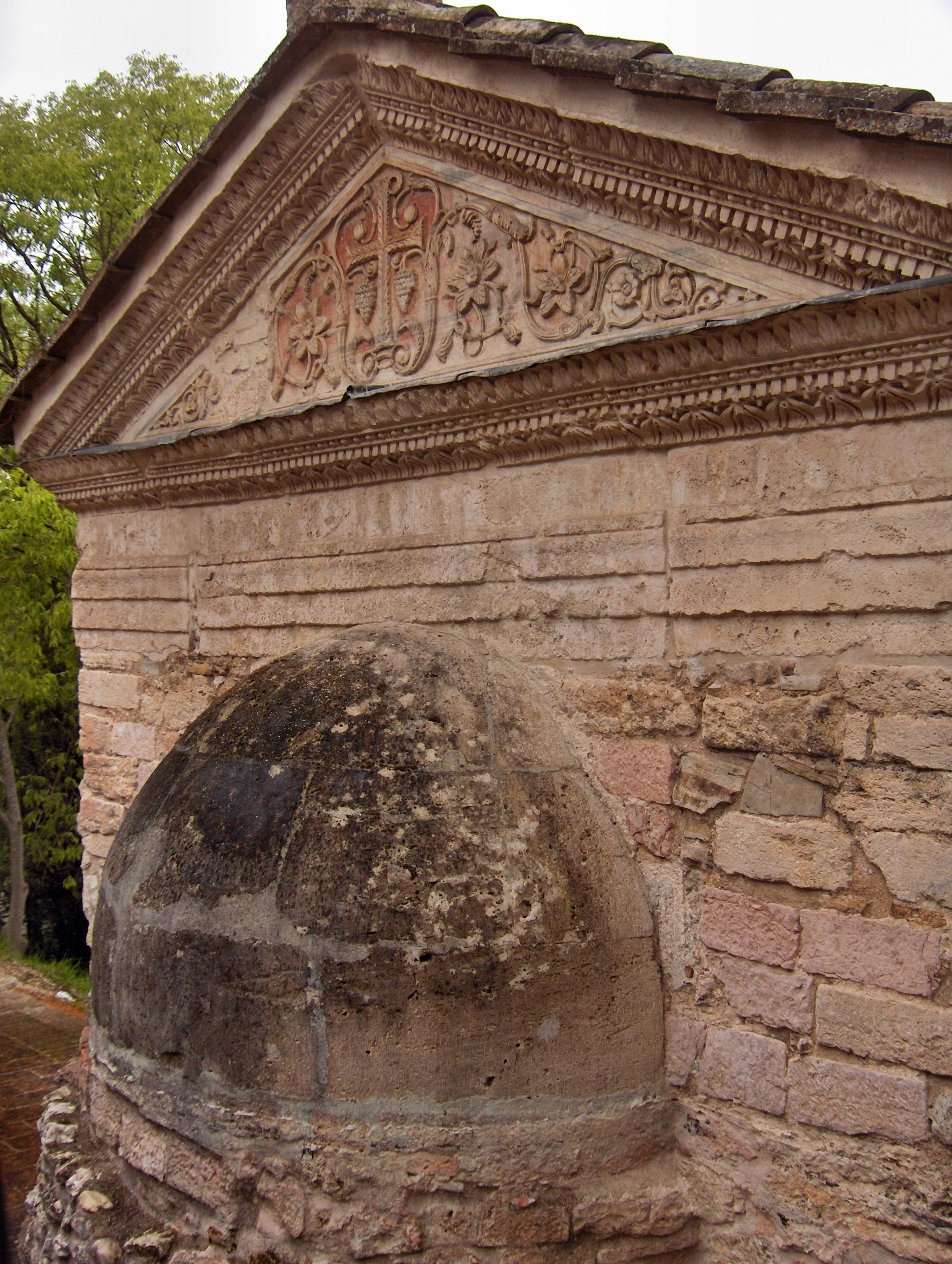
External view of the apse.

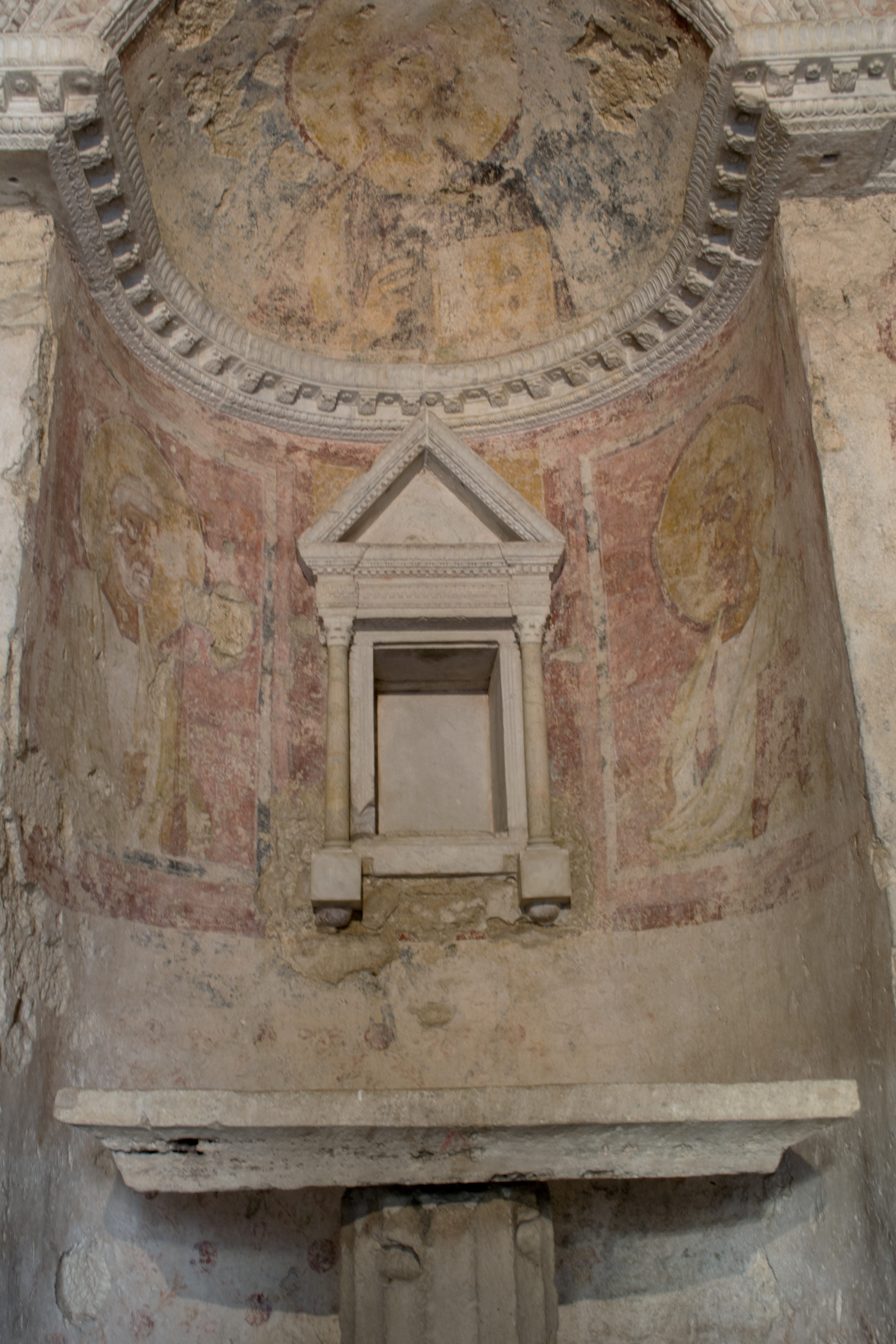
Internal view of the apse.

== Santa Sofia complex at Benevento ==
The Santa Sofia complex at Benevento (Campania) is located around the Santa Sofia church, previously home to the most important Longobard duke of Langobardia Minor and founded by Duke Arechis II around 760. It was based on the model of the Palatine chapel of Liutprando in Pavia; the central plan is based on that of the homonymous church of Constantinople, however, at the centre, there are six columns which support the dome which are positioned at each of the corners of a hexagon and are connected by arches. The inner hexagon is then surrounded by a decagonal ring with eight piers in white limestone and two pillars at either side of the entrance, each arranged parallel to the corresponding wall. Fragments of original frescoes, which used to cover the whole of the inside of the church, remain on the two side apses.

A monastery is also a part of the complex, although it had been preserved after being rebuilt in the 13th century, replacing the original Longobard building with another later addition of a quadrangular cloister.

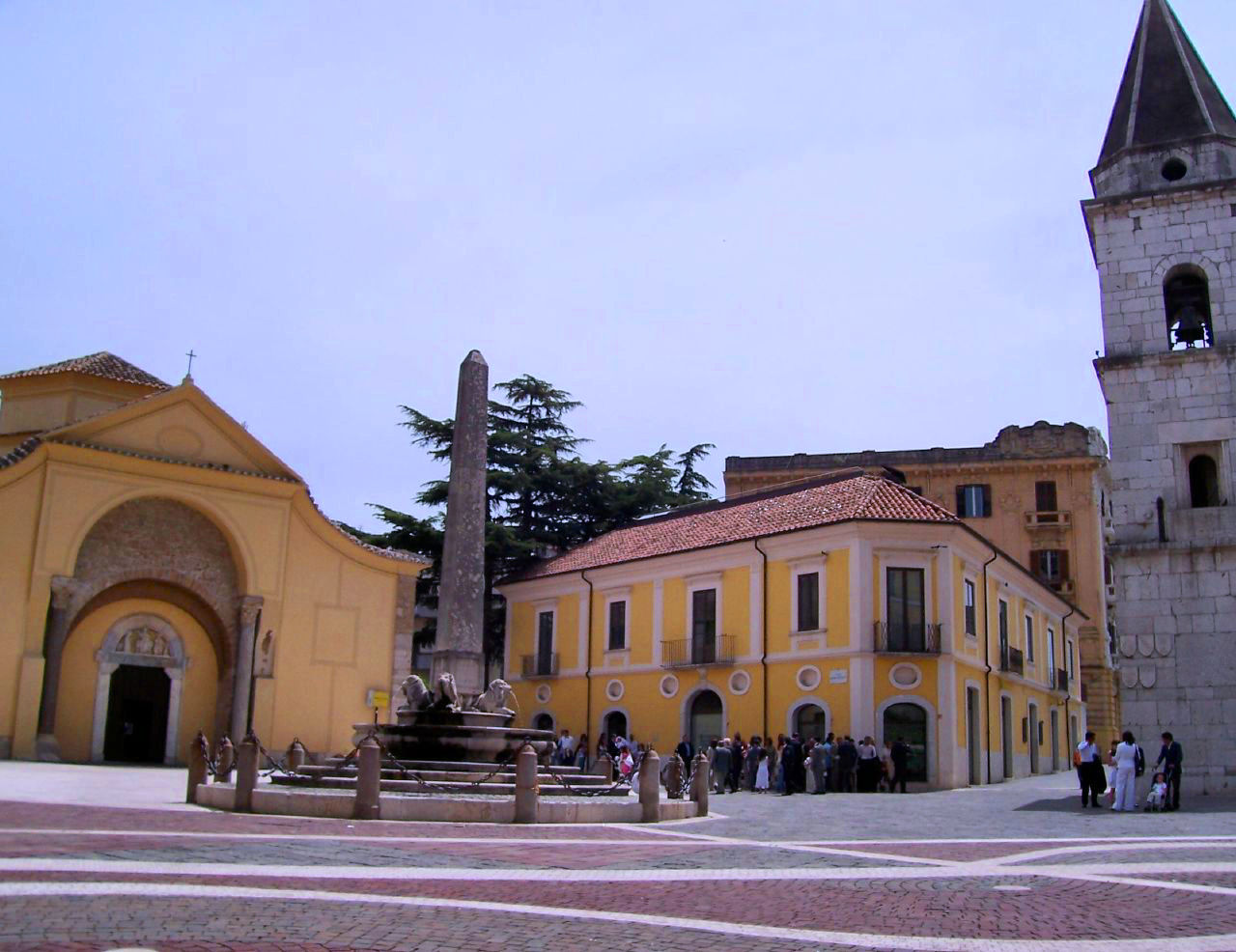
The Santa Sofia complex.

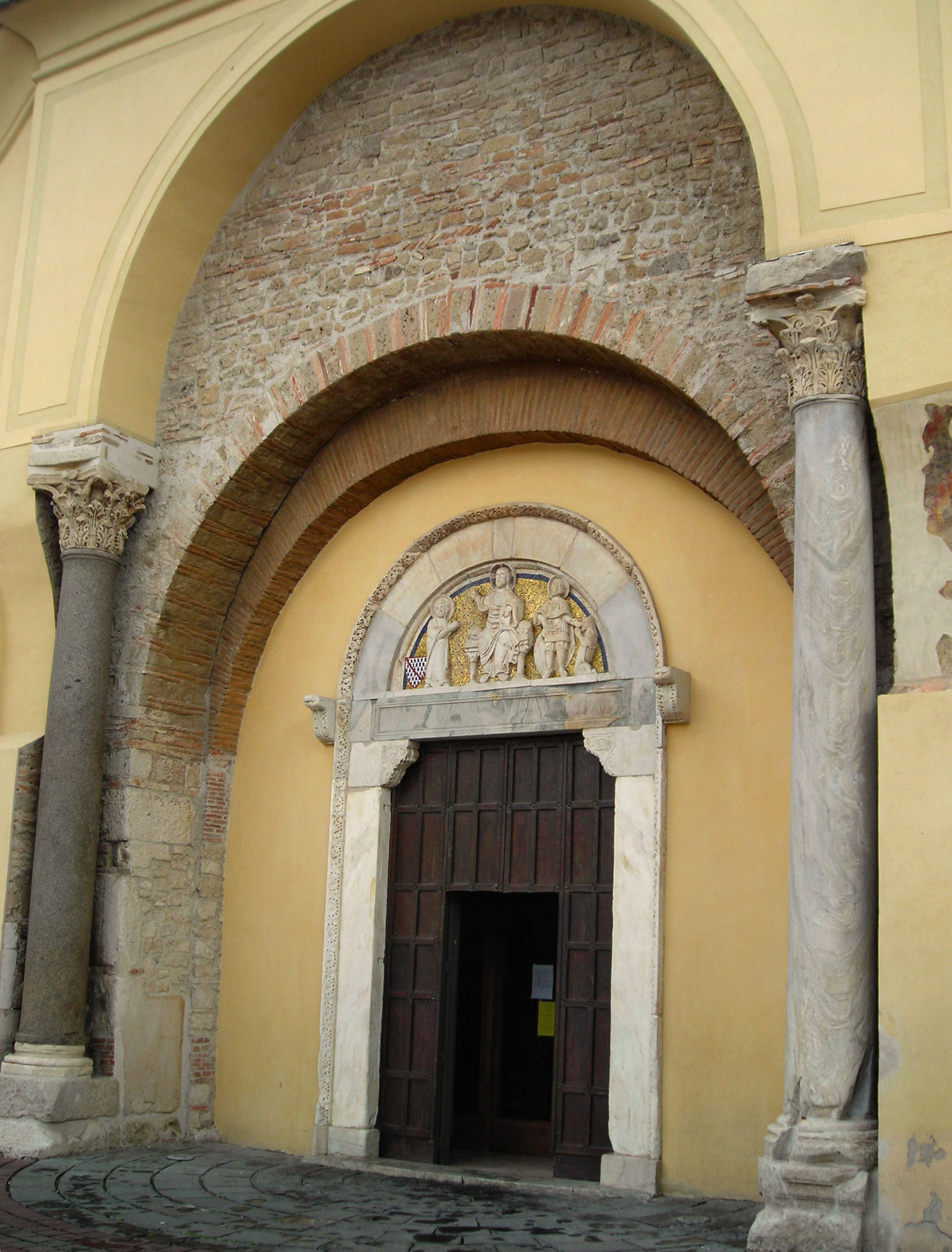
The portal of the church.

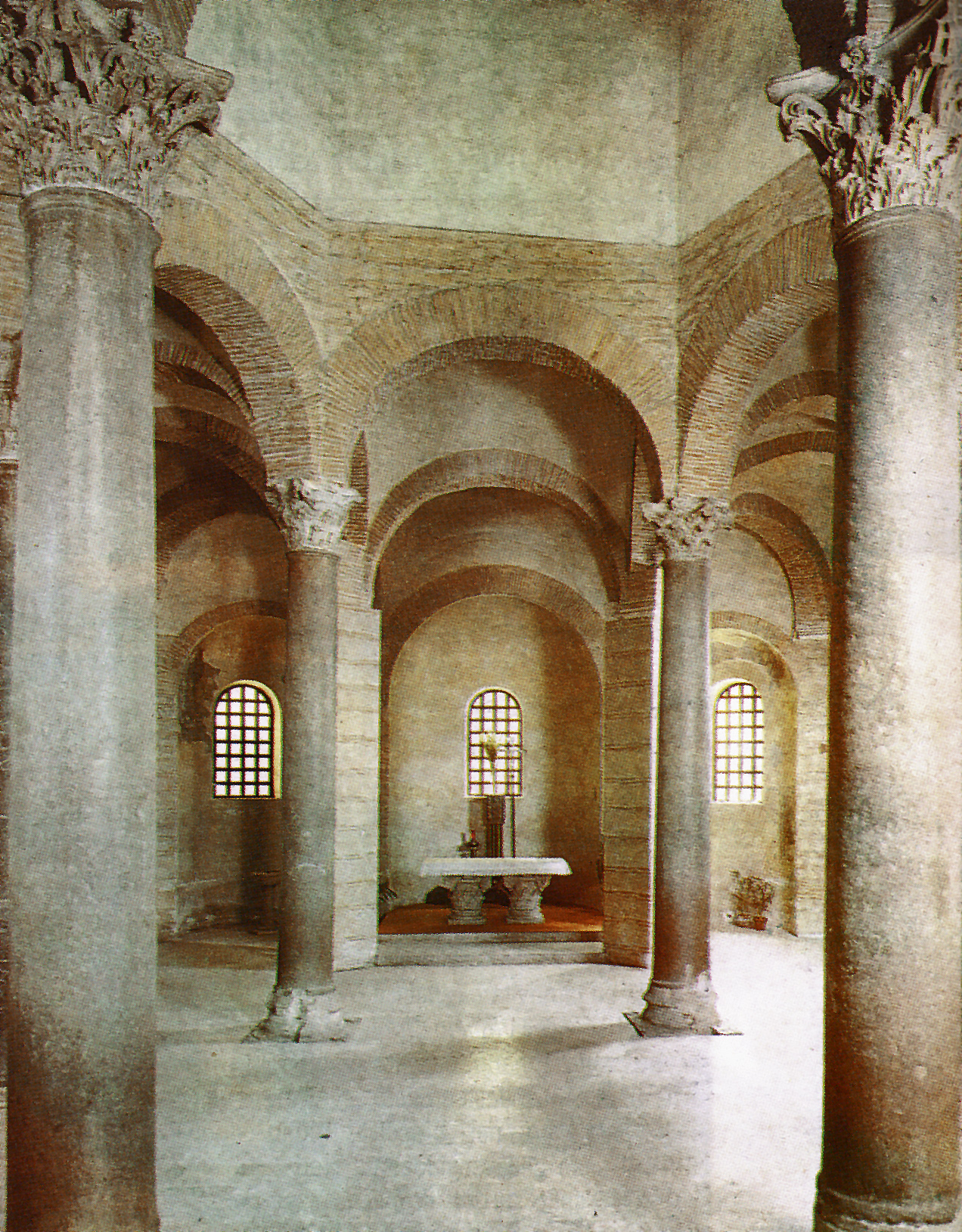
Internal view of the church.

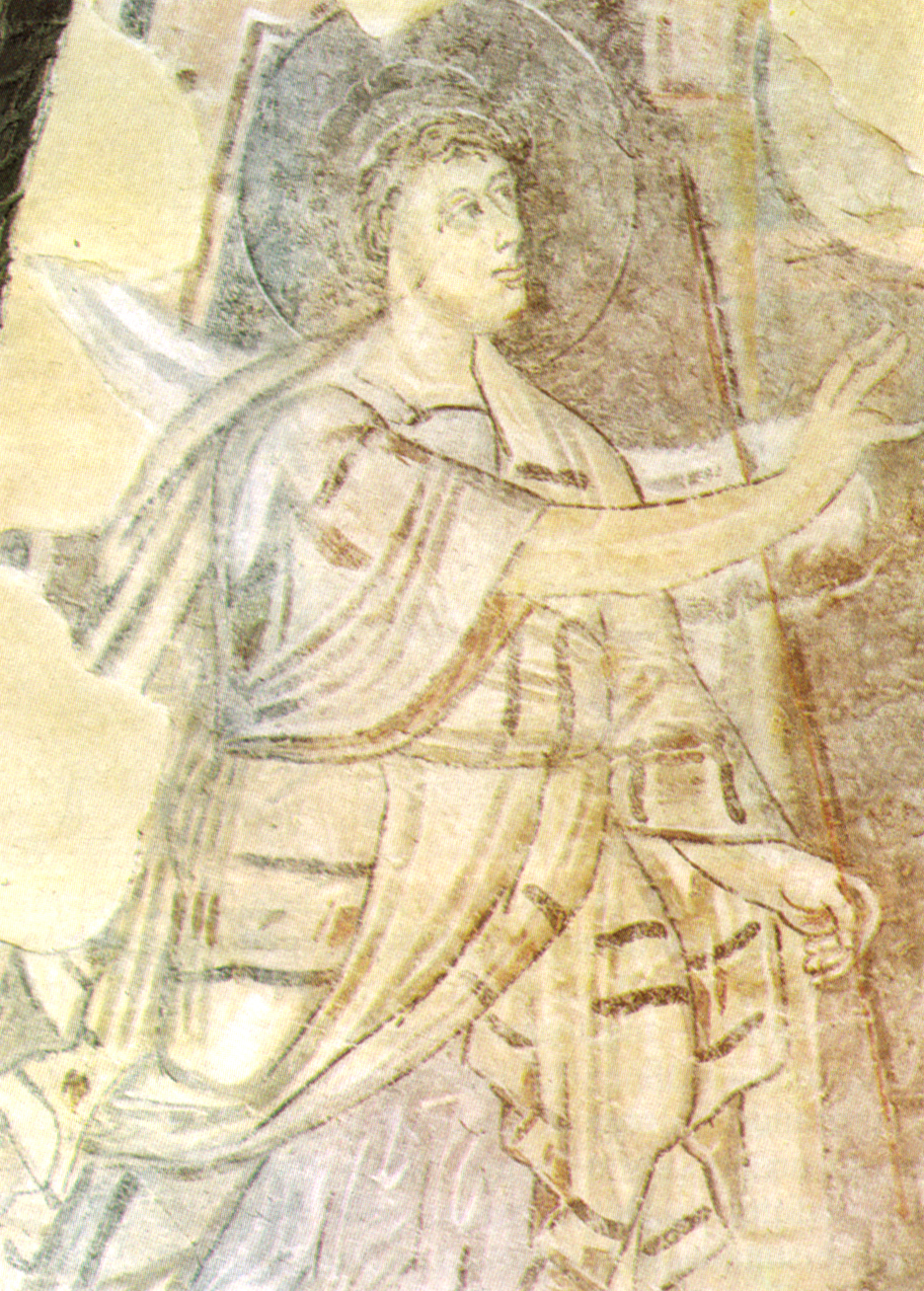
Detail of the frescoes, with the Annunciation of Zacharias.

== Sanctuary of San Michele at Monte Sant'Angelo ==
The Sanctuary of San Michele at Monte Sant'Angelo (Province of Foggia) is situated in the Duchy of Benevento and was founded before the arrival of the Longobards but adopted by them as a national sanctuary after their conquest of the Gargano (7th century). The sanctuary, a testament to the veneration of Saint Michael, was the object of the monumental patronage for both of the dukes of Benevento, who both settled in Pavia, which was upgraded with numerous renovations in order to facilitate access to the cave of the first apparition and to accommodate the pilgrims. San Michele Arcangelo has become one of the main pilgrimage destinations for Christians it is a stage in one of the variants of the Via Francigena which leads to the Holy Land.

The sanctuary has been mostly reconstructed, especially the higher parts; during the Longobard age, only the crypts provided access to the cave where, according to tradition, Michael the archangel had appeared.

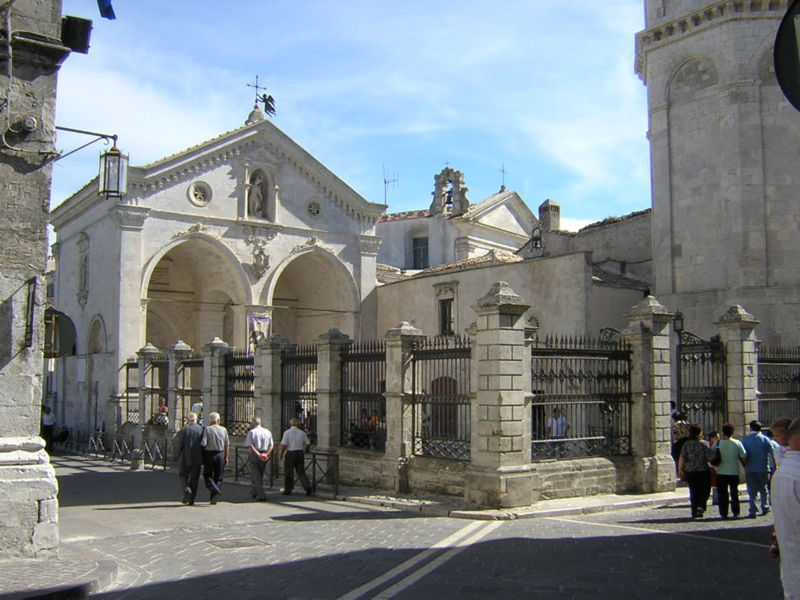
The Sanctuary of San Michele

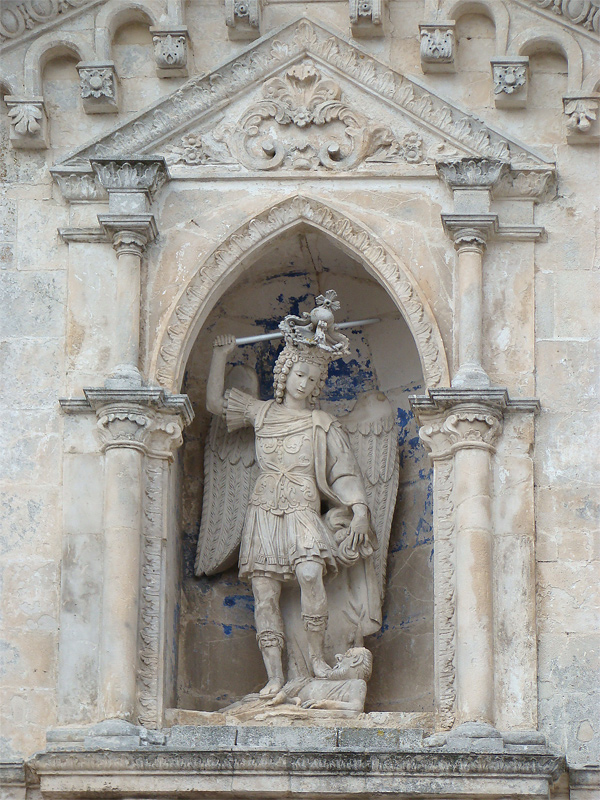
Statue of Saint Michael overlooking the entrance of the sanctuary.

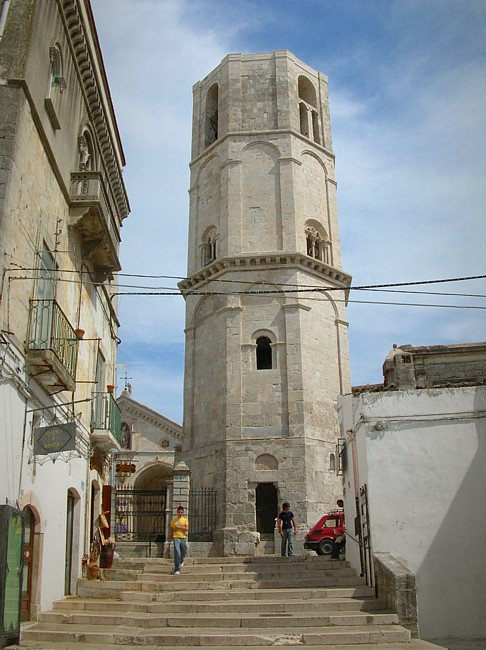
The octagonal tower (campanile) of the sanctuary.

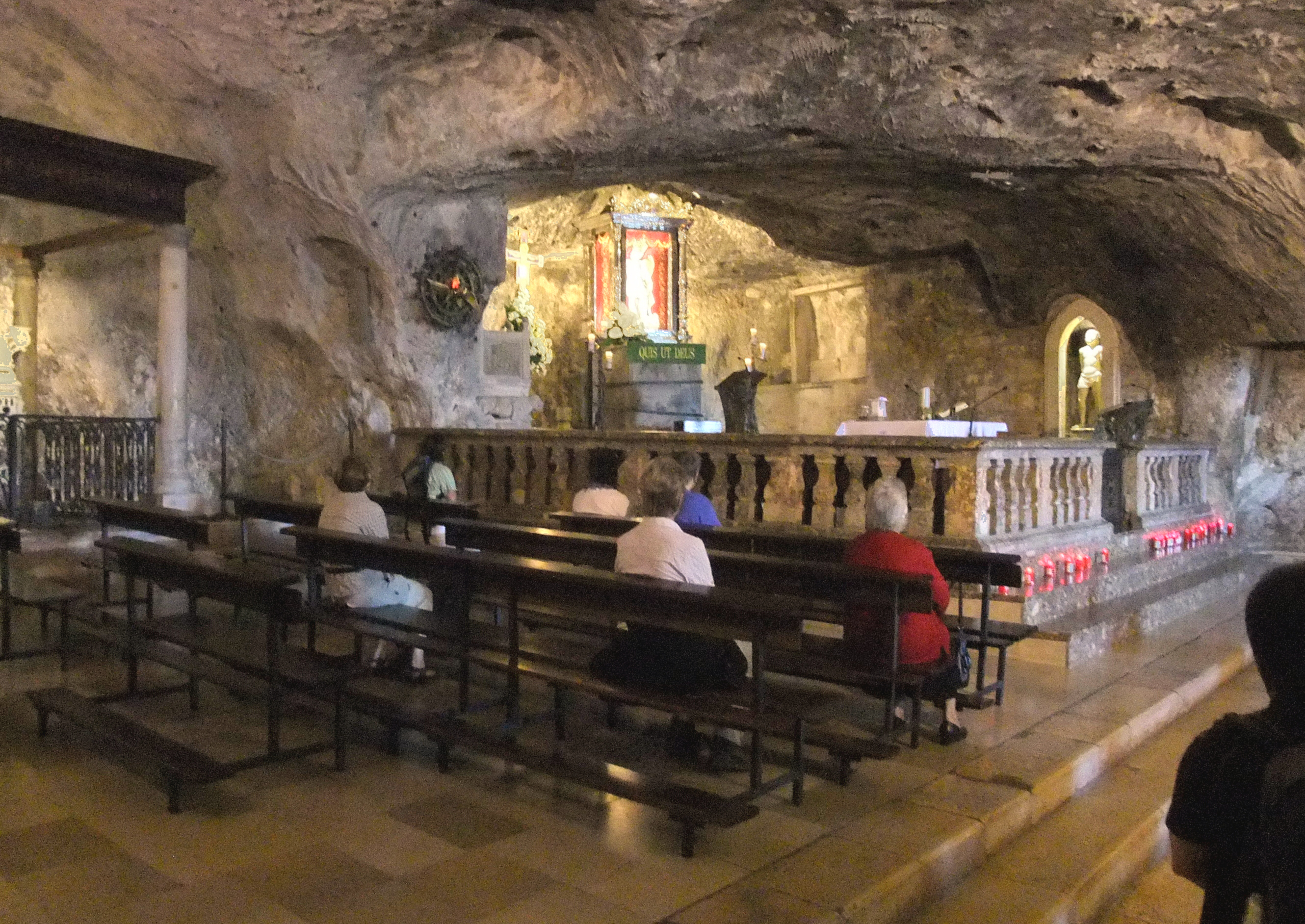
The cave where the Archangel Michael is said to have appeared.

== See also ==
- Lombard architecture
