= Capitolium of Brixia =

Roman temple in Brescia, Italy

UNESCO World Heritage Site
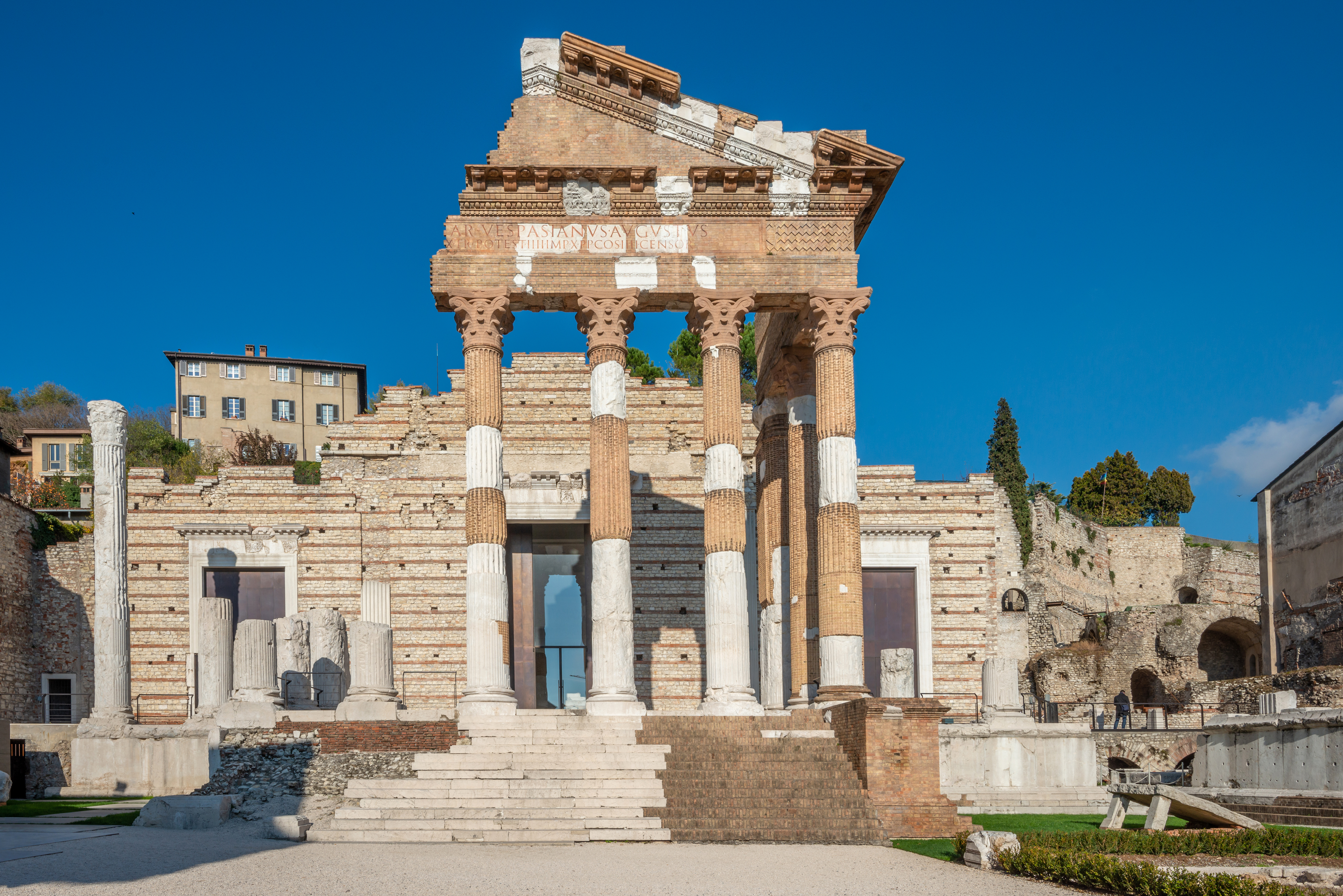
- Capitolium of Brixia

- Location within Italy
- Official name: The monumental area with the monastic complex of San Salvatore-Santa Giulia
- Location: Brescia, Italy
- Part of: Longobards in Italy. Places of the Power (568–774 A.D.)
- Criteria: Cultural: (ii), (iii), (vi)
- Reference: 1318-002
- Inscription: 2011 (35th Session)
- Coordinates: 45°32′24″N 10°13′33″E

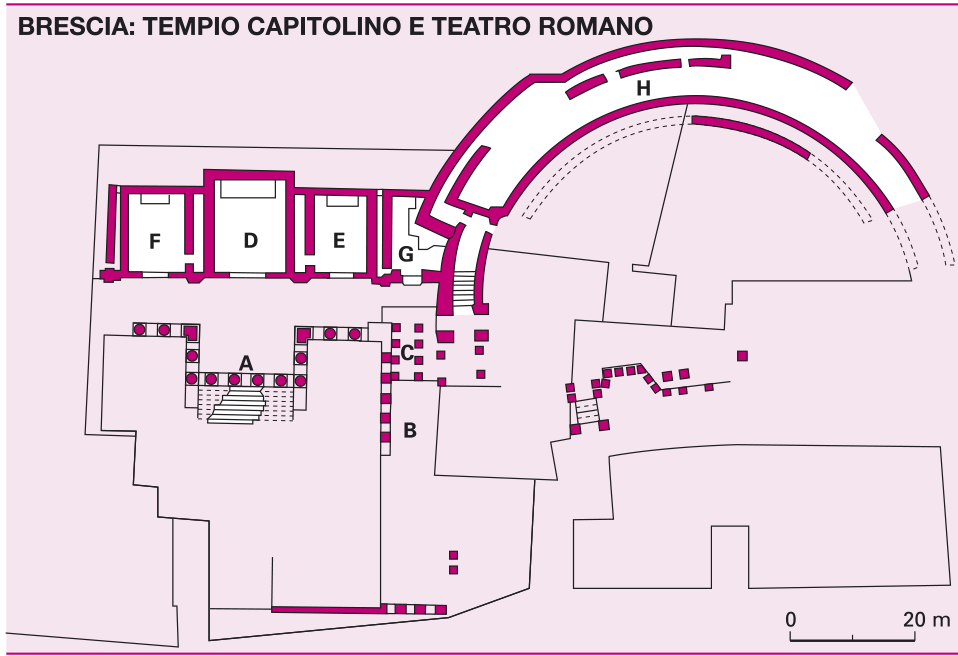
Plan of the Capitoline Temple (Capitolium) and the Roman Theatre of Brescia. Scale 0:20 m. (A) Pronaos, (B) Stylobate, (C) Hall of the Small Columns, (D‑E‑F‑G) Cells of the Capitolium, (H) Roman Theatre. In Guida Rossa Lombardia Touring Club Italiano

The Capitolium of Brixia or the Temple of the Capitoline Triad in Brescia was the main temple in the center of the Roman town of Brixia (Brescia), in Northern Italy, in the modern region of Lombardy. It is represented at present by fragmentary ruins, but is part of an archeological site, including a Roman theater and museum in central Brescia. It forms part of the Longobards in Italy: Places of Power (568–774 A.D.) UNESCO World Heritage Site inscribed in 2011.

== History ==
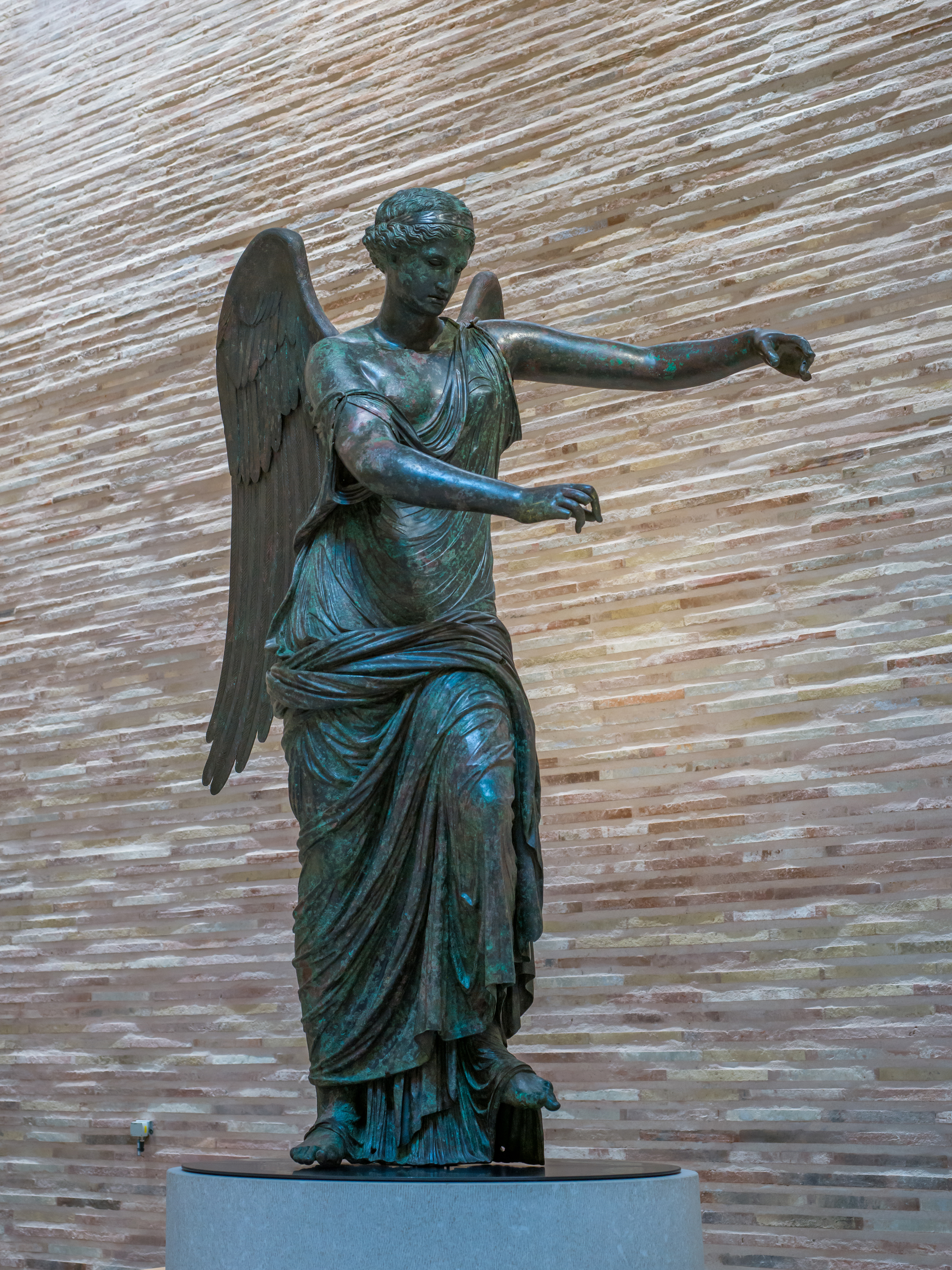
The winged Victory in the Capitolium Archeological Area

The temple was built in AD 73 during the rule of emperor Vespasian. The prominent elevated location and the three identifiable cellae, each with their own polychrome marble floor, all help confirm that this temple would have represented the capitolium of the town, that is the temple dedicated to the Capitoline Triad of Jupiter, Juno and Minerva. The Capitolium replaced an earlier set of temples, a "Republican Sanctuary", consisting apparently of four discrete temples that had been erected around 75–90 BC, and refurbished during the reign of Augustus.

The three cellae of the capitolium have been rebuilt, and the walls of the left cella are used as a lapidarium to display local epigraphs found during the 19th centuries. In front of the cellae are the partially reconstructed remains of a portico, which was composed of Corinthian columns that supported a pediment with a dedication to the emperor Vespasian. The complex, and other Roman ruins are located at one end of Via dei Museii, once the original Decumanus Maximus of Brixia, which coursed some 5 meters below the present street level. Broad stairs rose up to the portico from the Decumanus.

Almost entirely buried by a landslide of the Cidneo Hill, the temple was rediscovered in 1823. Reconstruction was performed soon after by Rodolfo Vantini. During excavation in 1826, a bronze statue of a winged Victory was found inside it, likely hidden in late antiquity to preserve it from pillage. Since 2021 the restored statue of the winged Victory is exhibited again in the Capitolium Archeological Area Museum.

== See also ==
- List of Ancient Roman temples
- Temple of Jupiter (Pompeii)
