= Lombard architecture =

Medieval Italian architecture

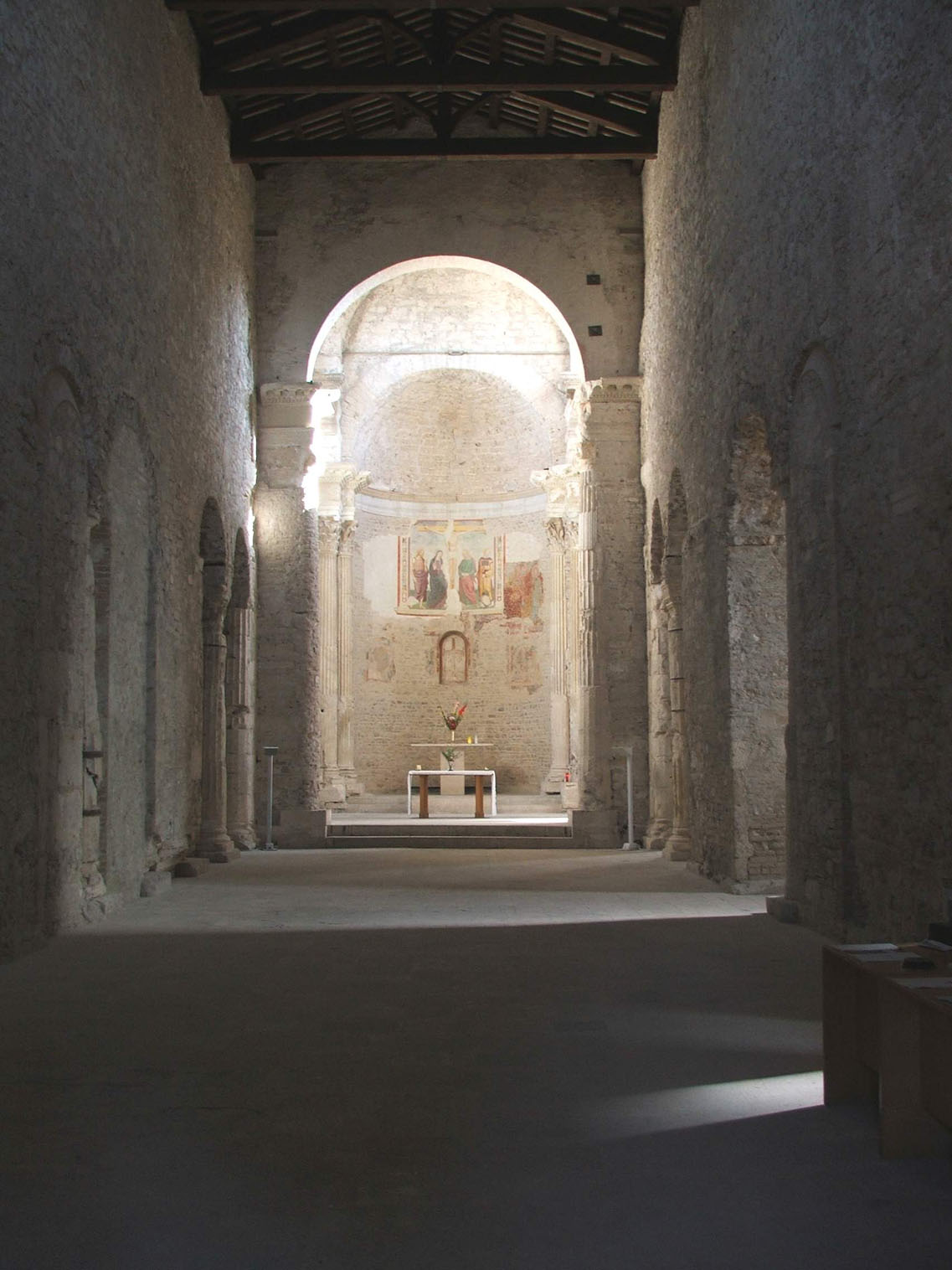
Basilica of San Salvatore, Spoleto

Lombard architecture refers to the architecture of the Kingdom of the Lombards, which lasted from 568 to 774 (with residual permanence in southern Italy until the 10th–11th centuries) and which was commissioned by Lombard kings and dukes.

The architectural works of the Lombards in northern Italy (Langobardia Major) have been mostly lost due to later renovations or reconstructions, the few exceptions including the Tempietto longobardo at Cividale del Friuli or the Church of Santa Maria foris portas at Castelseprio. More examples have instead survived in southern Italy (Langobardia Minor), especially in what was the Duchy of Benevento: they include the city's walls, the church of Santa Sofia and the Rocca dei Rettori, one of the few surviving Lombard military structures, as well as other minor sites near Benevento and in the former duchy of Spoleto.

The main surviving examples of Lombard architecture have been included in the Longobards in Italy: Places of Power (568–774 A.D.) site. This consists of seven places with notable architectural, artistic and sculptural, and has been a UNESCO World Heritage Site since 2011.

== Characteristics ==
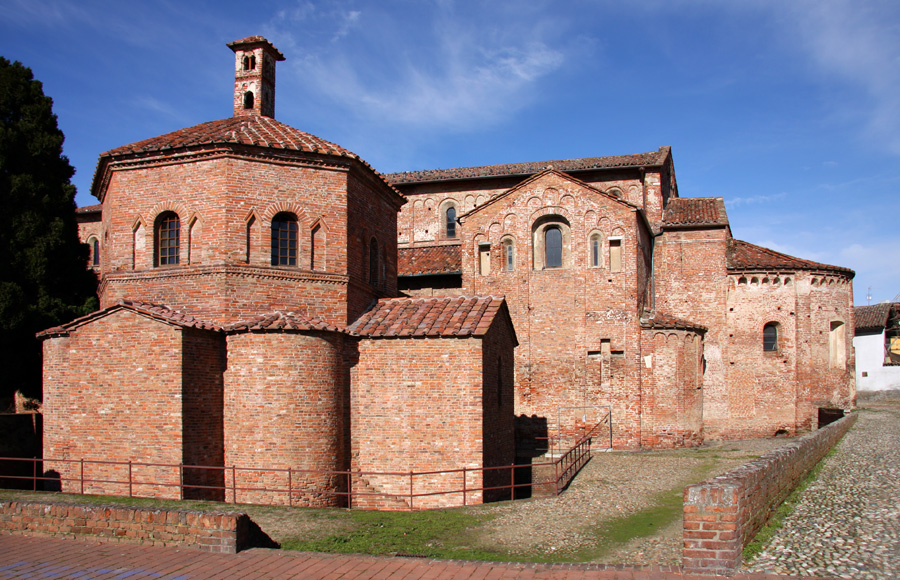
View of the Baptistery of San Giovanni ad Fontes with the basilica behind.

The most ancient edifices built by the Lombards in Italy, and in particular in their capital Pavia, have been destroyed or largely renewed in later times. Some trends, which usually ran in different ways from the Roman and Palaeo-Christian architectures predominant in Italy up to late Antiquity, have been identified from archaeological studies or other sources. The destroyed church of Santa Maria in Pertica at Pavia, for example, had a typical Roman plan (octagonal with an ambulatory delimited by columns) but its very high central body was a novelty. The Baptistery of San Giovanni ad Fontes in Lomello, also departed from the typical Palaeo-Christian compactness in the use of a tall central octagon. As it had been in Roman times, the commission of lay and religious buildings was used by the Lombard elite to express their prestige and to legitimate their authority.

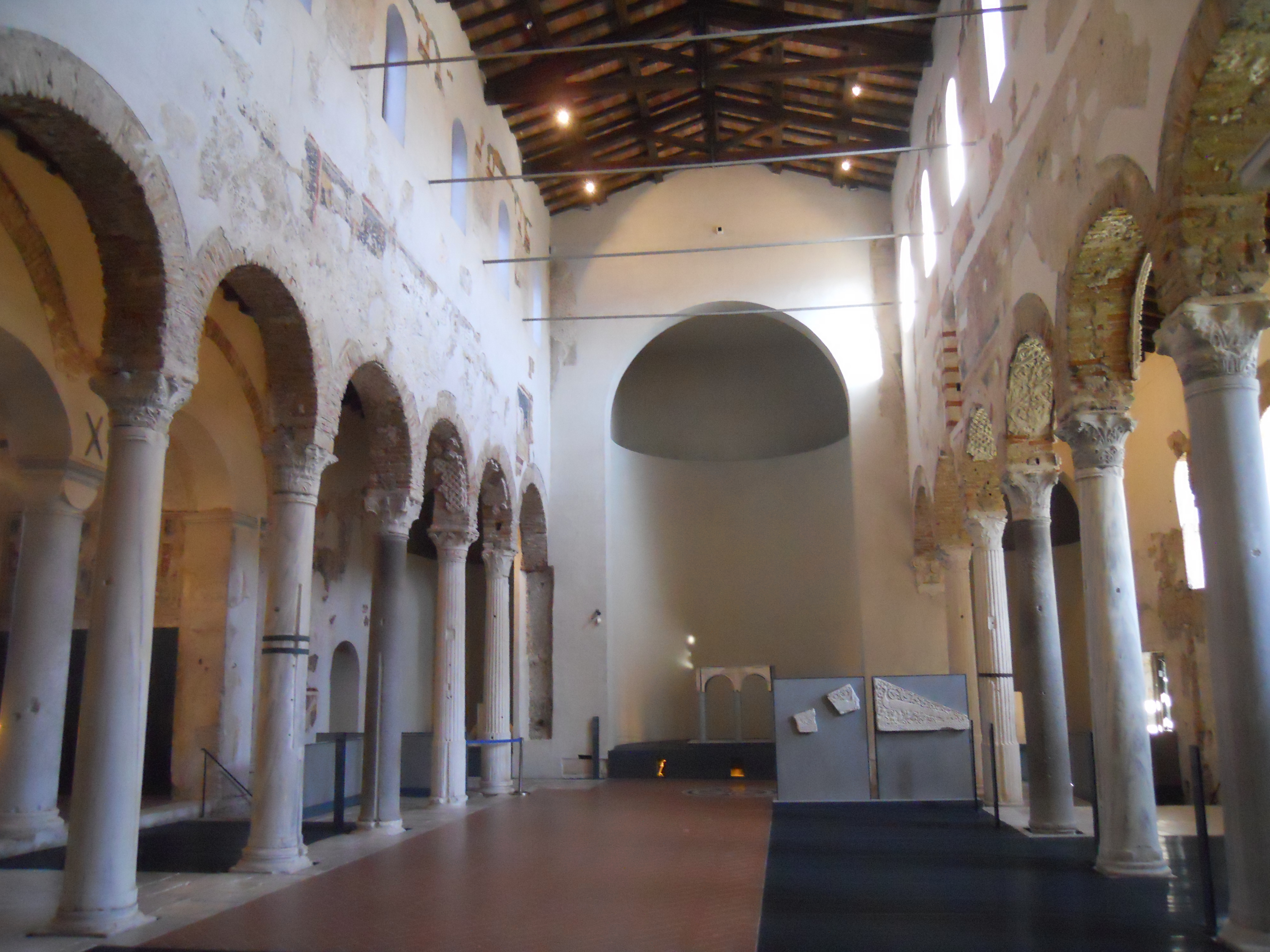
San Salvatore, Brescia

In the 7th and 8th centuries, the Lombard architecture evolved in an original direction, with increasing references to Classical architecture. This trend, characterized by the co-presence of different influences and the adoption of new techniques, culminated in the reign of king Liutprand (712–744), in particular at Cividale del Friuli. Edifices such as the Lombard Tempietto in the latter city, or the Monastery of San Salvatore at Brescia show echoes of the contemporary architecture in Ravenna. In this period, the construction of monasteries received a particular impulse, not only as places of adoration or as shows of faith of the commissioners, but also as shelters for the latter's assets and persons and as sites of political control. King Desiderius (756–774), and with him numerous dukes, gave a particular boost to this trend, which had no direct comparison in the rest of Europe at the time.

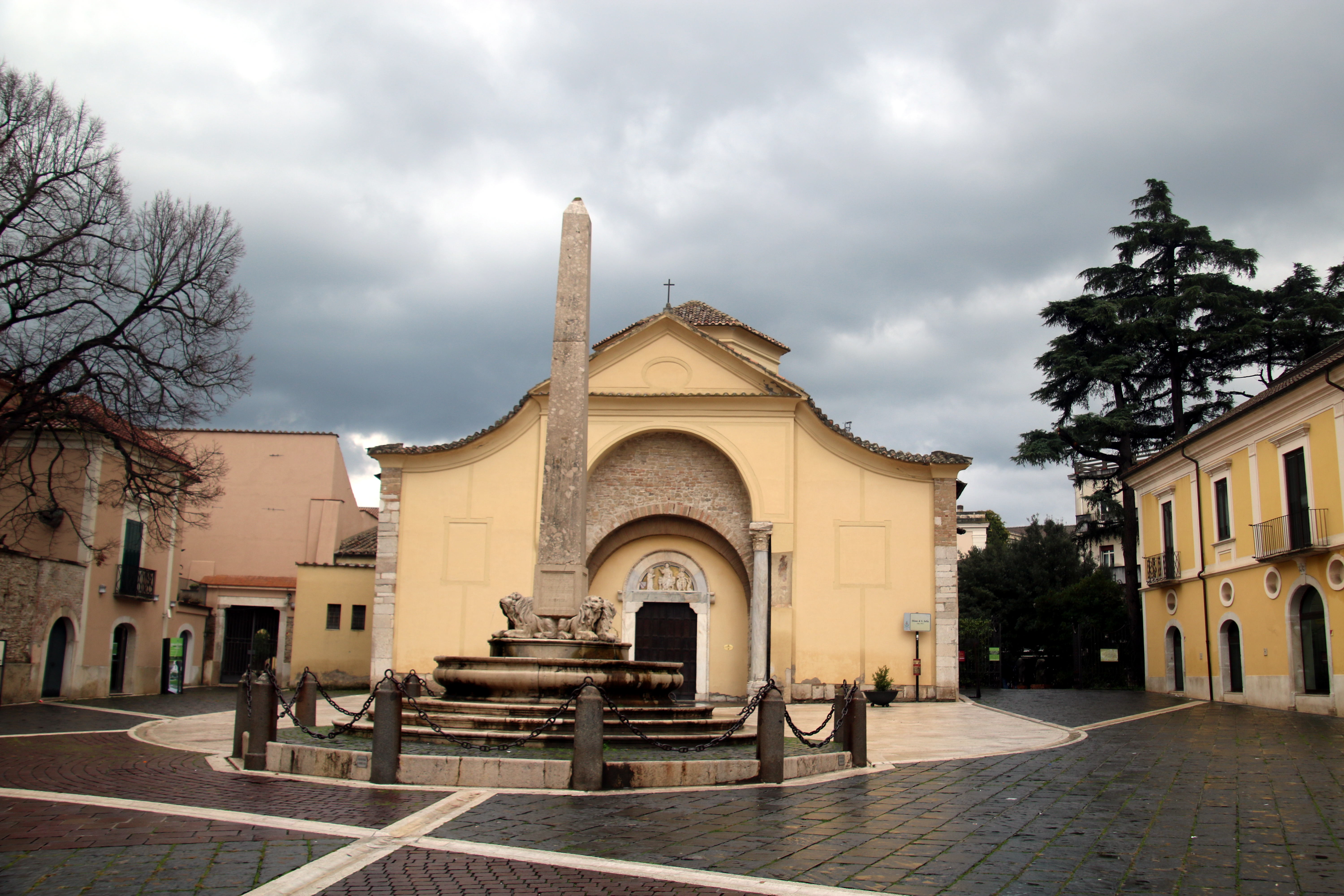
Santa Sofia, Benevento

The development of Lombard architecture in northern Italy was halted by the conquest of Charlemagne in 774. In southern Italy, still partly under effective Lombard domination, architecture followed original lines until the conquest by the Normans in the 11th century. This unity is shown in particular by the most important Lombard edifice in what was Langobardia Minor, the church of Santa Sofia at Benevento: built in the 8th century, it follows the same pattern of Santa Maria in Pertica with an elevated central body, although mitigated by Byzantine elements such as the articulations of the volumes and the basic structure itself, perhaps inspired by Hagia Sophia at Constantinople.

When they arrived in Italy in the late 6th century, the Lombards had no architectural tradition of their own. They thus relied on local workforce, taking advantage of the presence of organizations and guilds capable of high level works, which had been kept alive thanks to the relative survival of the urban civilization in Italy after the fall of the Western Roman Empire (differently from most of contemporary Christian western Europe).

== List of structures ==
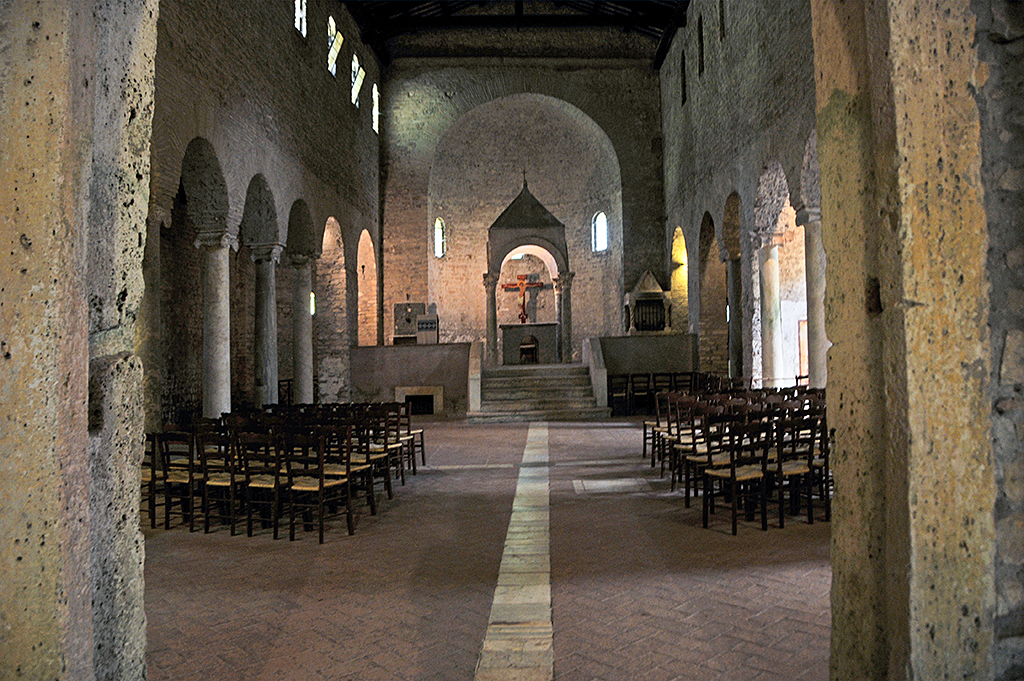
Interior of the Abbey of Saint John in Argentella

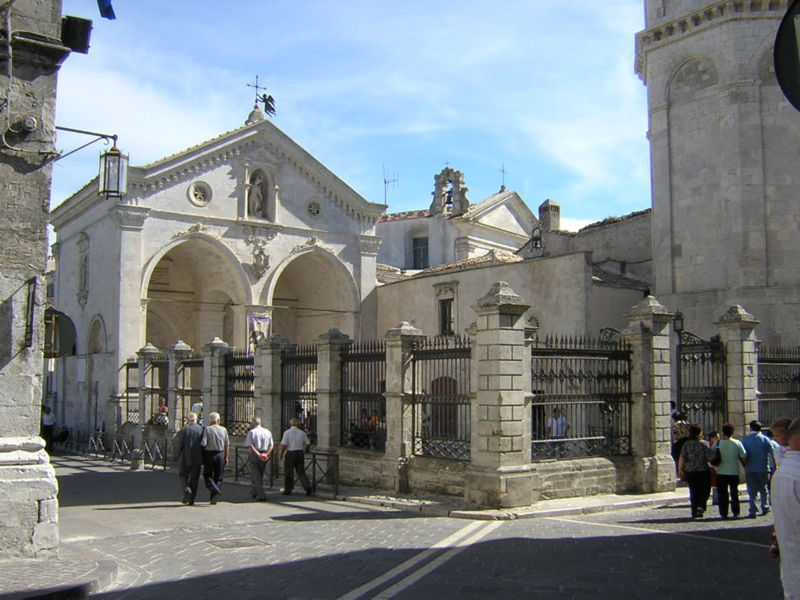
The Sanctuary of Monte Sant'Angelo

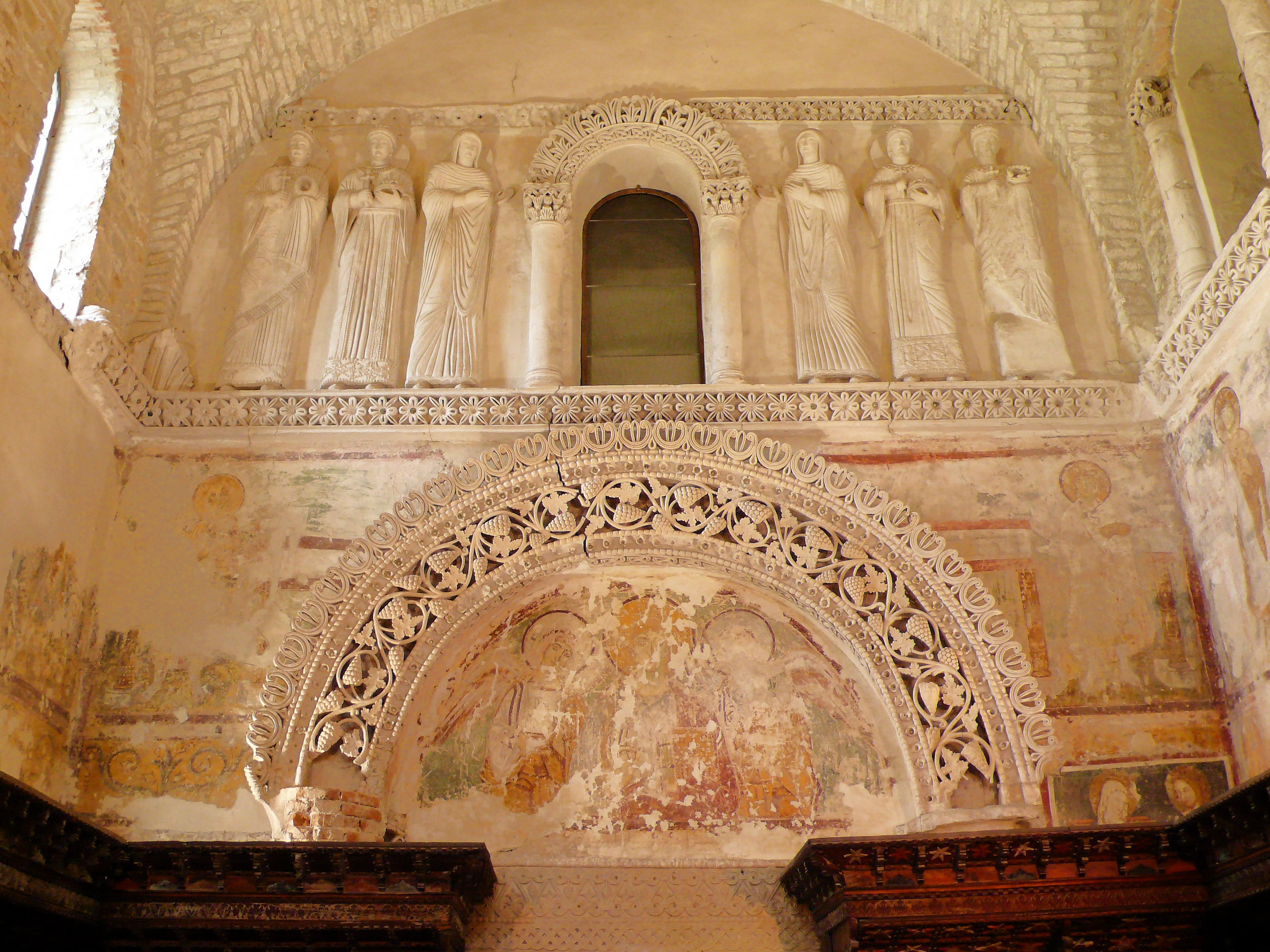
The Tempietto longobardo

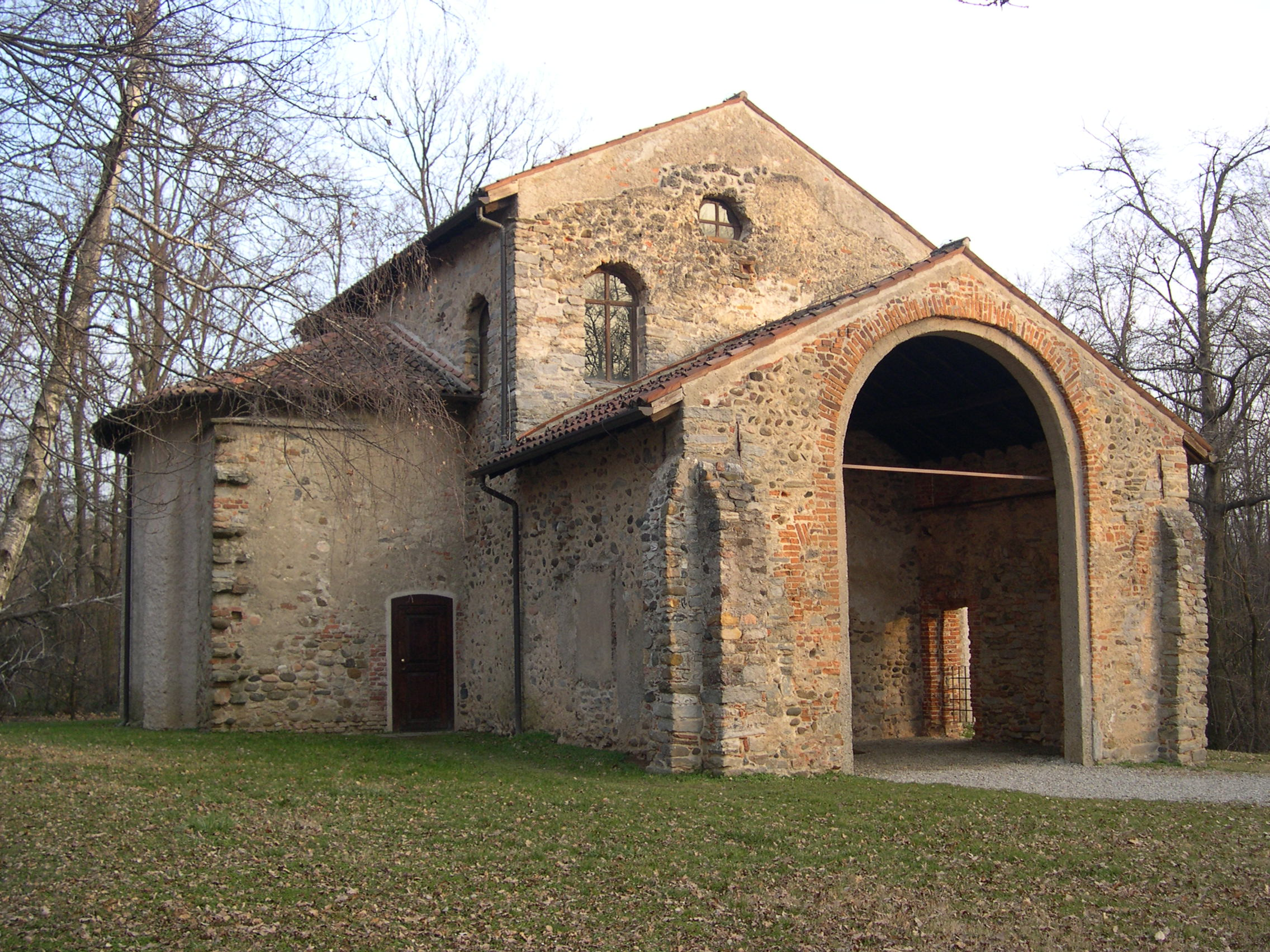
Church of Santa Maria foris portas at Castelseprio

=== 6th century ===
- Abbey of Saint John in Argentella
- Basilica autarena, Fara Gera d'Adda (c. 585)
- Royal Palace, Monza (c. 585)
- Basilica of St. John the Baptist, Monza (c. 585)
- Earliest part of the walls of Benevento

=== 7th century ===
- Complex of St. John the Baptist, Turin (c. 610)
- Basilica of St. John the Baptist, Monza (c. 635)
- Church of St. Eusebius, Pavia (c. 650)
- Church of St. John Domnarum, Pavia (654)
- Monastery of San Salvatore, Pavia (657)
- Basilica of San Michele Maggiore, Pavia (662–671)
- Church of Santa Maria in Pertica, Pavia (677)
- Enlargement of the Royal Palace in Pavia by Perctarit (c. 680)
- Church of St. Peter in Vincoli, Pavia (680)
- Lomello Baptistery of San Giovanni ad Fontes, Lomello
- Reconstruction of the Basilica of St. John the Baptist, Castelseprio
- Monastery of Santa Maria Teodote, Pavia
- Church of Santo Stefano Protomartire, Rogno
- Rocca dei Rettori, Benevento
- Sanctuary of Monte Sant'Angelo

=== 8th century ===
- Basilica of San Pietro in Ciel d'Oro, Pavia (c. 730–740)

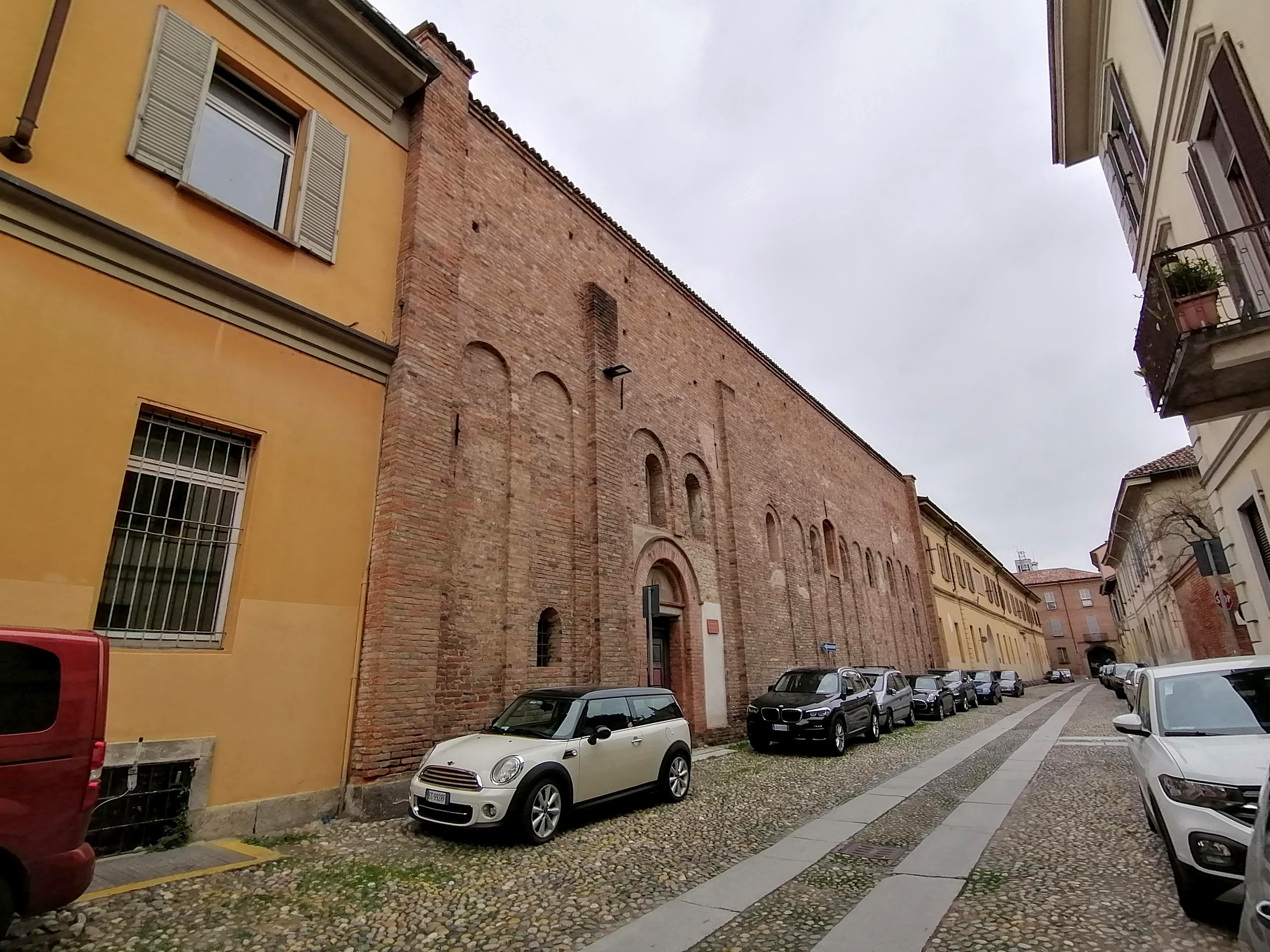
Monastery of San Felice in Pavia

- Royal Palace in Corteolona (c. 730–740)
- Monastery of St. Christine, Santa Cristina e Bissone (c. 730)
- Enlargement of the Royal Palace in Pavia by Liutprand (c. 730–740)
- Episcopal complex of patriarch Calixtus, Cividale del Friuli (c. 740)
- Monastery of St. Mary delle Cacce, Pavia (747)
- Church of St. Marinus, Pavia (c. 749–756)
- Tempietto longobardo, Cividale del Friuli (c. 750)
- Church of St. Theodore, Pavia (752)
- Monastery complex of Santa Giulia with the Basilica of San Salvatore, Brescia (753)
- Abbey of Leno (c. 758)
- Monastery of St. Felix, Pavia (760)
- Church of Santa Sofia, Benevento (760)
- Walls of Benevento, enlargement by Arechis II (760–770)
- Torba Abbey, Castelseprio
- Basilica of San Salvatore, Spoleto

=== 9th century ===
- Church of Santa Maria foris portas (c. 830–840)

=== Later ===
After the Frankish conquest, Lombardy again began to develop styles that became trendsetters of European architecture:

- Lombard Romanesque, also called First Romanesque, started in the early 11th century.
