= Gerenzago =

- Comune
- Comune di Gerenzago
- Location within Italy Location within Lombardy
- Coordinates: 45°12′N 9°22′E
- Country: Italy
- Region: Lombardy
- Province: Province of Pavia (PV)
- Frazioni: Galbere, Cascina Mellana, Cascina Castellere

Government
  - Mayor: Daniele Mandrini

Area
  - Total: 5.41 km^{2} (2.09 sq mi)
- Elevation: 74 m (243 ft)

Population (31 August 2017)
  - Total: 1,422
  - Density: 263/km^{2} (681/sq mi)
- Demonym: Gerenzaghesi
- Time zone: UTC+1 (CET)
  - Summer (DST): UTC+2 (CEST)
- Postal code: 27010
- Dialing code: 0382
- Patron saint: St. Pudentiana, St. Maurus
- Saint day: 3rd Sunday in May, 15 January
- Website: Official website

Gerenzago is a comune (municipality) in the Province of Pavia in the Italian region Lombardy, located about 35 km (22 mi) southeast of Milan and about 15 km (9.3 mi) east of Pavia.

Gerenzago borders the following municipalities: Copiano, Corteolona e Genzone, Inverno e Monteleone, Magherno, and Villanterio. Economy is mostly based on agriculture and craftmanship, in particular related to building activities.
