= Inverno e Monteleone =

Inverno e Monteleone Invèrän e Muntagliòn (Emilian)
- Comune
- Comune di Inverno e Monteleone
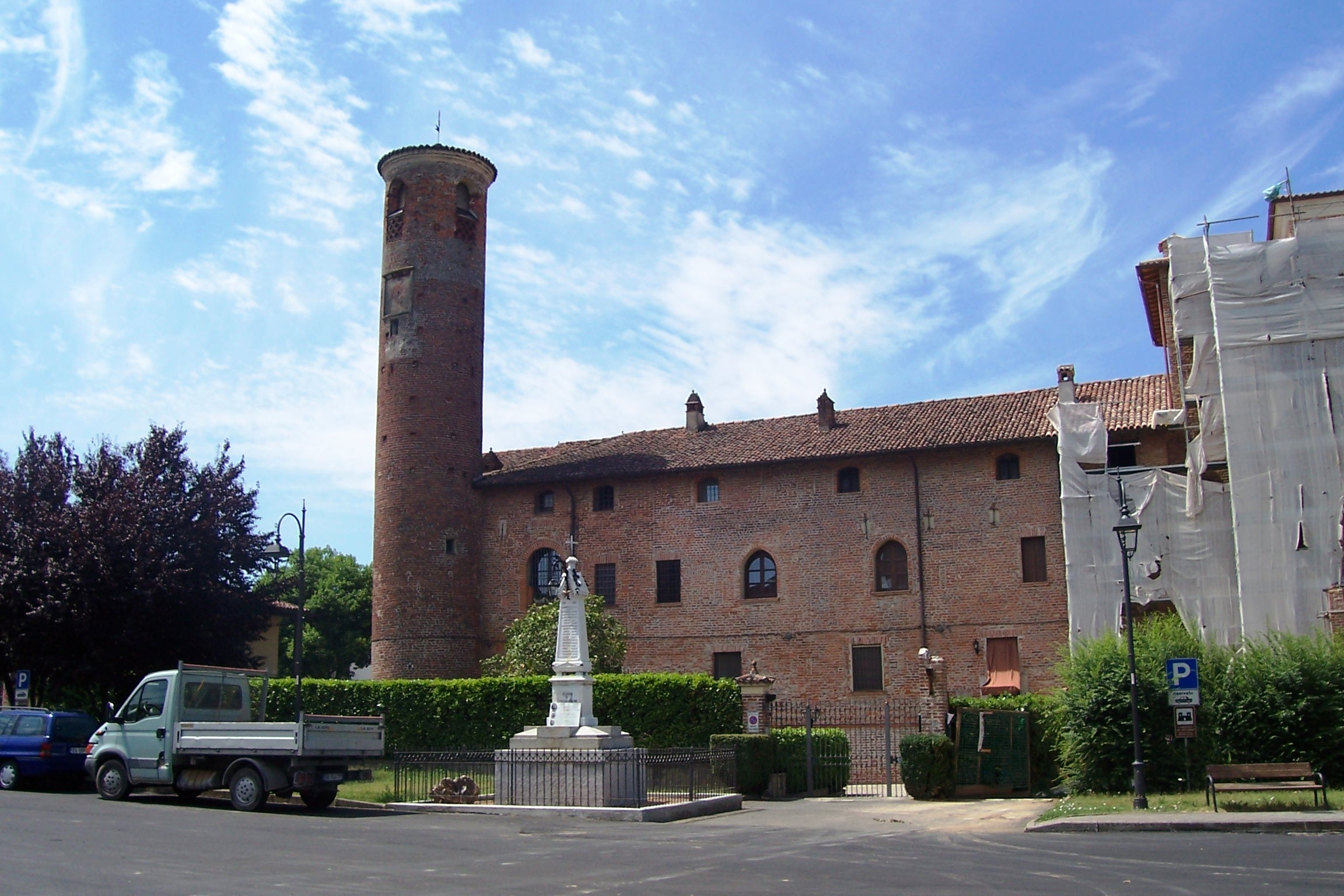

- Location within Italy Location within Lombardy
- Coordinates: 45°12′N 9°23′E
- Country: Italy
- Region: Lombardy
- Province: Pavia (PV)

Government
  - Mayor: Enrico Vignati

Area
  - Total: 9.64 km^{2} (3.72 sq mi)
- Elevation: 74 m (243 ft)

Population (31 August 2017)
  - Total: 1,495
  - Density: 155/km^{2} (402/sq mi)
- Demonym(s): Invernini and Monteleonesi
- Time zone: UTC+1 (CET)
  - Summer (DST): UTC+2 (CEST)
- Postal code: 27010
- Dialing code: 0382
- Website: Official website

Inverno e Monteleone (Italian pronunciation: [iɱˈvɛrno e mmonteleˈoːne] Vogherese: Invèrän e Muntagliòn) is a comune (municipality) in the Province of Pavia in the Italian region Lombardy, located about 35 km (22 mi) southeast of Milan and about 20 km (12 mi) east of Pavia.

Inverno e Monteleone borders the following municipalities: Corteolona e Genzone, Gerenzago, Miradolo Terme, Sant'Angelo Lodigiano, Santa Cristina e Bissone, Villanterio.
