= Enrico Pedrini =

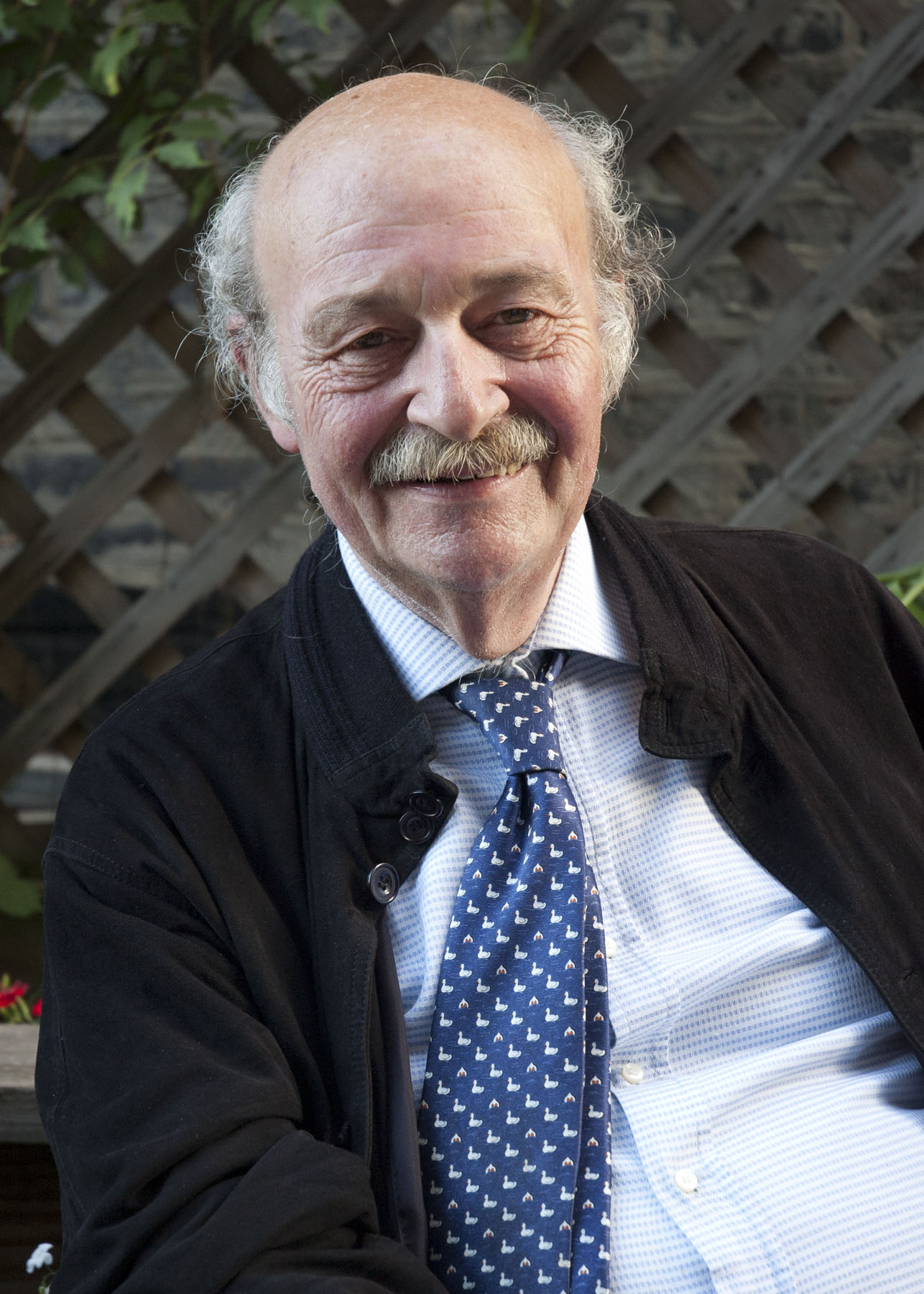
- Pedrini in 2006
- Born: 15 January 1940; Filighera
- Died: 19 April 2012 (aged 72); Genova
- Resting place: Pavia
- Occupations: Writer, art critic, collector
- Website: enricopedrini.org

Enrico Pedrini (15 January 1940 in Montesano di Filighera – 19 April 2012 in Genova) was an academic, theorist and collector of Conceptual Art. He also taught epistemology in Italy.

== Research and curation ==
Pedrini placed particular emphasis on the work of Bernar Venet, Art & Language, and Victor Burgin. His books and essays examined issues in Anthropological Art, Conceptual Art, and Possibilism, and include John Cage, Happenings and Fluxus (1986) and The Quantic Machine and the Second Avant-Garde (1991), in which he discusses the relation between quantum theory and the visual arts movements from the 1960s.

Pedrini studied the interaction of dissipating systems, chaos theory, and new potentials of art. He curated a number of international exhibitions, in venues such as Studio Oggetto in Milan, the Persano Gallery in Turin, the MAMAC in Nice, Andrea Meislin Gallery in New York City, and the Williamsburg Art & Historical Center in New York City. In 1995 he curated, with Wolfgang Becker, the Taiwanese Pavilion at the 46th Venice Biennale.

Pedrini was also a keen collector of contemporary art. His collection focused on Dada, Fluxus, Minimal Art, Arte Povera, Vienna Aktionism, and Graffiti Art.

== Selected bibliography ==
- Irreversibility and the Avant-Garde: an Essay on Physics and Modern Culture, 2004, (ISBN 1-893207-02-1)
- Daniel Rothbart: Works 1988-2009, 2010, (ISBN 978-88-6141-044-2)
- Giuseppe Chiari e la teoria dell’arte in Fluxus, 1992, Naples, Ulisse & Calipso Edizioni Mediterranee.
