= Copiano =

- Comune
- Comune di Copiano
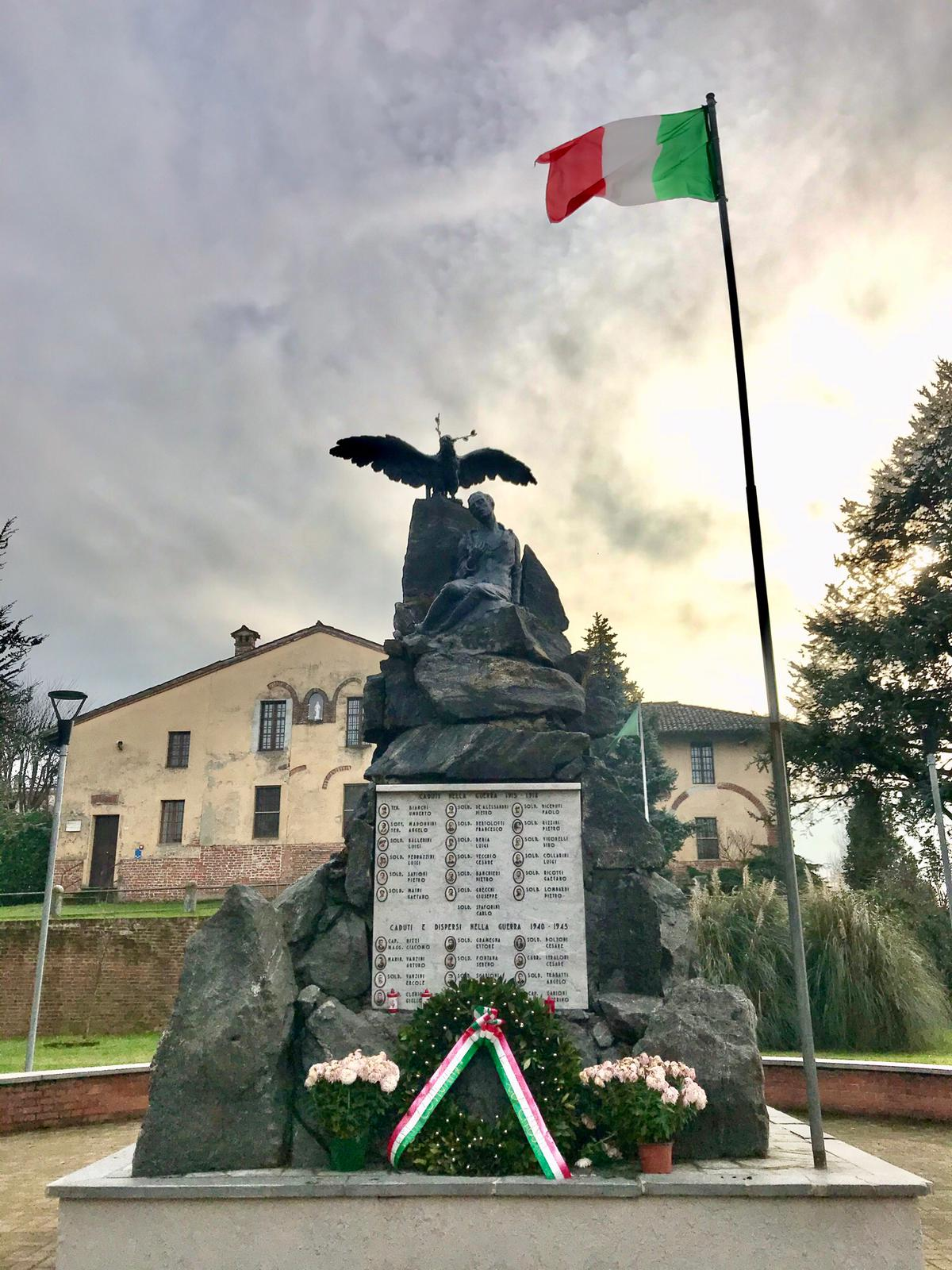
- War memorial in Copiano

- Location within Italy Location within Lombardy
- Coordinates: 45°12′N 9°19′E
- Country: Italy
- Region: Lombardy
- Province: Pavia (PV)

Government
  - Mayor: Andrea Itraloni

Area
  - Total: 4.34 km^{2} (1.68 sq mi)
- Elevation: 74 m (243 ft)

Population (01 January 2020)
  - Total: 1,726
  - Density: 398/km^{2} (1,030/sq mi)
- Demonym: Copianini or Copianesi
- Time zone: UTC+1 (CET)
  - Summer (DST): UTC+2 (CEST)
- Postal code: 27010
- Dialing code: 0382
- Website: Official website

Copiano is a comune (municipality) in the Province of Pavia in the Italian region Lombardy, located about 30 km southeast of Milan and about 13 km east of Pavia.

Copiano borders the following municipalities: Filighera, Corteolona e Genzone, Gerenzago, Magherno, Vistarino.

== History ==
Known since the 12th century as Cupianum, it was seat of an ancient pieve of the Diocese of Pavia and it was part of the Campagna Sottana of Pavia. It was, during the 14th century, signoria of the Beccaria of Pavia. In 1622 it was conquered by the Salerno and in 1647 by the Omodei (both of Pavia), and in 1717 by the Modignani of Lodi.
