= Magherno =

- Comune
- Comune di Magherno
- Location within Italy Location within Lombardy
- Coordinates: 45°13′N 9°20′E
- Country: Italy
- Region: Lombardy
- Province: Pavia (PV)
- Frazioni: Cascinetto, Isola

Government
  - Mayor: Giovanni Amato

Area
  - Total: 5.1 km^{2} (2.0 sq mi)
- Elevation: 76 m (249 ft)

Population (30 September 2017)
  - Total: 1,717
  - Density: 340/km^{2} (870/sq mi)
- Demonym: Maghernini
- Time zone: UTC+1 (CET)
  - Summer (DST): UTC+2 (CEST)
- Postal code: 27010
- Dialing code: 0382
- Website: Official website

Magherno is a comune (municipality) in the Province of Pavia in the Italian region Lombardy, located about 30 km (19 mi) southeast of Milan and about 15 km (9.3 mi) east of Pavia.

Magherno borders the following municipalities: Copiano, Gerenzago, Torre d'Arese, Villanterio, Vistarino.
