= Oratorio di Santa Maria in Valle =

Church in Cividale del Friuli, Italy

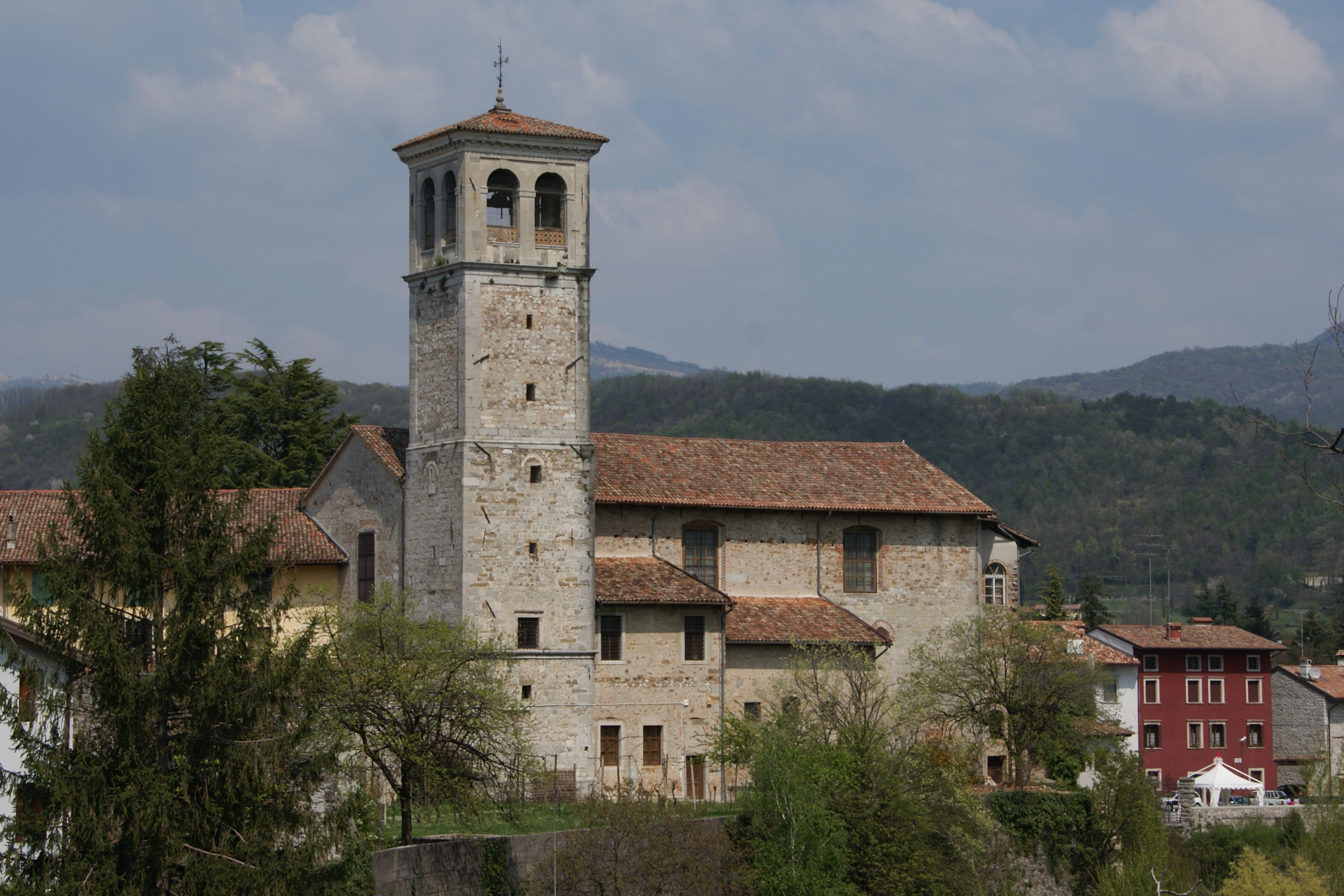
Oratorio di Santa Maria in Valle, also known as Tempietto longobardo

The Oratorio di Santa Maria, or Oratory of Santa Maria, previously called the Tempietto longobardo, is located in Valle on the north-eastern frontier at Cividale del Friuli in the province of Udine. It was erected in the 8th century under the rule of a Germanic people called the Lombards who ruled most of the Italian Peninsula from 568 to 774. This is the most important and best preserved example of Lombard architecture, which resembles styles found in Ottonian, Roman, Lombardy and Carolingian art. Included within the temple and chapel are decorated frescoes and high relief sculptures of saints in stucco.

== History ==
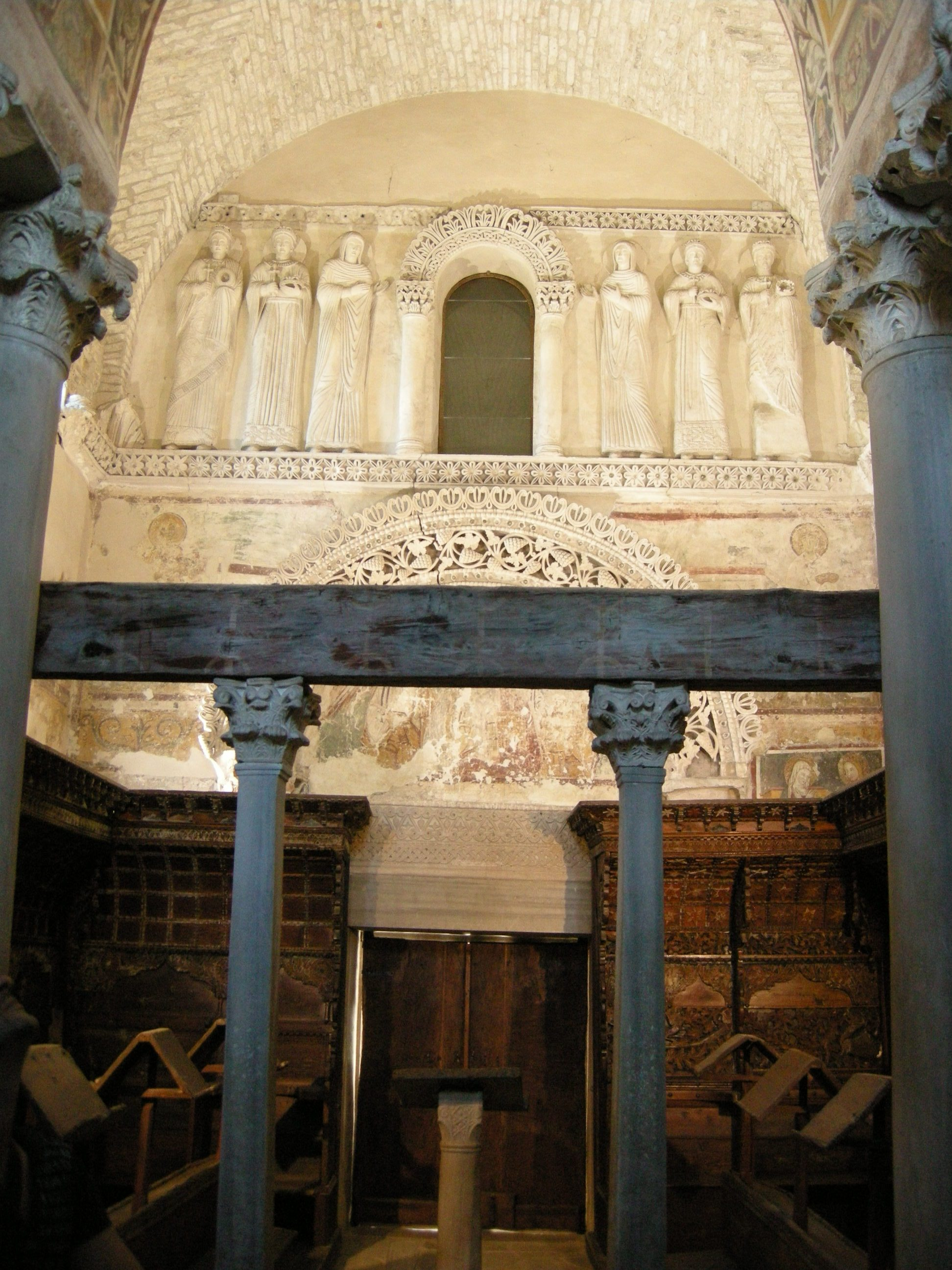
The Tempietto longobardo.

The small structure was likely begun as a part of the Gastaldaga area and Episcopal complex at Cividale del Friuli next to the Natisone river.

It stands as one of the few architectural examples of a positive relationship between Europe and Arab-Muslim countries, which is apparent by the techniques utilized and the stucco decorations, probably initiated by Aistulf, Duke of Friuli and King of the Lombards, and used as a Palatine Chapel for Lombard Dukes and the king's functionaries. Although started much earlier, many of the decorations, statues and stuccos might have been constructed as late as the 11th and 12th centuries and includes Byzantine motifs.

It is a part of the seven architectural, pictorial and sculptural sites within the Longobards in Italy: Places of Power (568–774 A.D.) and received a UNESCO Cultural heritage designation.

== Interior ==
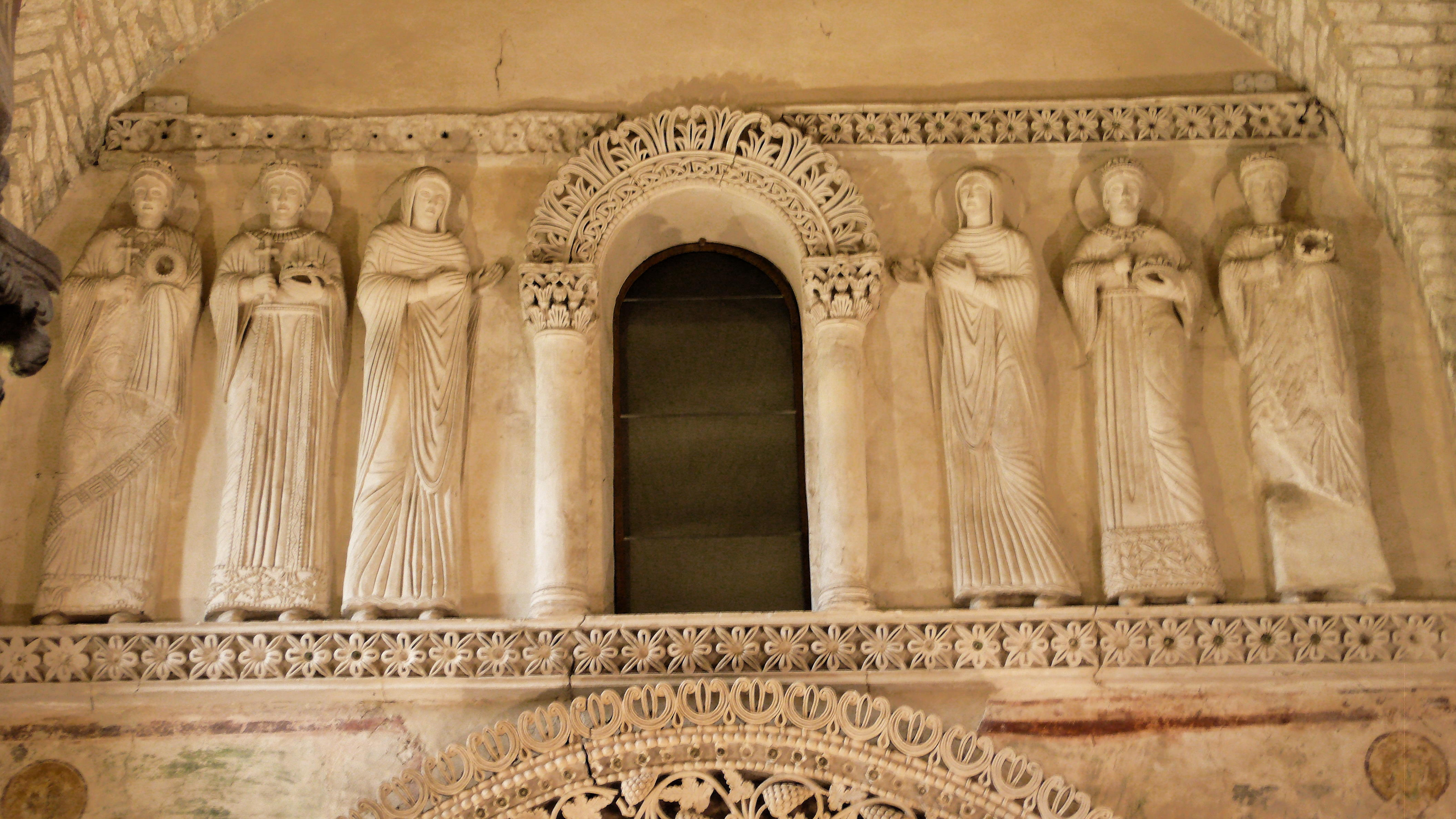
Stucco figures of female saints

The exterior is rather plain, but the interior is a complex 3 to 5 ratio composed of a square-plan, single chamber, with a spacious cross-vault, divided by pairs of columns in three parts covered in barrel vaults, which closes with a lower presbytery.

The changes in power create a very significant collision between artists styles and genres; the space is dense with rich decoration that was important for both secular and contemporary ecclesiastical interiors and is made with sophisticated materials. The view of the entrance wall is covered with stuccos and fresco wall-paintings that depict the Blessing of Christ amongst the Archangels Michael, Gabriel and other male saints. The walls are filled in with various floral stucco decorations done in high-relief. There are bi-colored floors, marble wall revetments, mosaics and sculptures done in stone. The most curious aspect however is the frieze which includes six remaining important stucco figures of unidentified women that were potentially saints or royal patrons. The figures are stylized, richly decorated with dramatic folds in their garments and slightly elongated which is reminiscent of Byzantine models.
