= Daniel Rothbart =

American artist

Daniel Kenneth Rothbart (Stanford, CA, January 29, 1966), is an artist and writer.

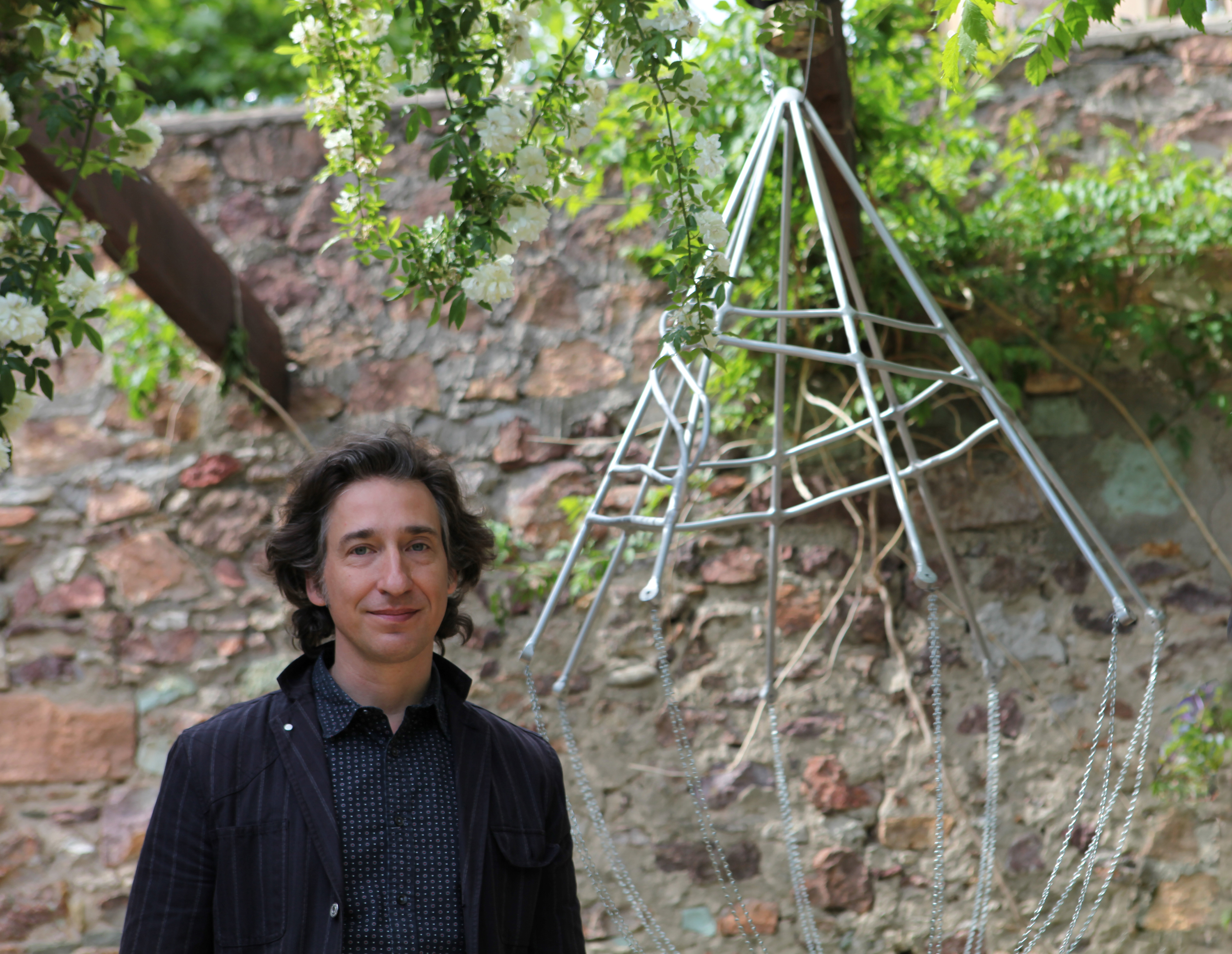
Daniel Rothbart at Château de La Napoule

== Early life ==
Rothbart was born in Stanford, California and raised in Eugene, Oregon. He is the son of psychologists Myron Rothbart and Mary K. Rothbart. He studied sculpture at the Rhode Island School of Design and Columbia University.

== Art and writing ==
Daniel Rothbart is an artist and writer whose work explores the relationship between nature, urban postmodern identity and metaphysics. In the words of critic John Ash, "What he presents is the visual aspect of an imaginary 'ritual without theology' (to use his own phrase)." Art theorist and curator Enrico Pedrini wrote, "His world of myth prompts one to reconsider the sacred as a point of interaction where icons and symbols converge and undergo changes of meaning."

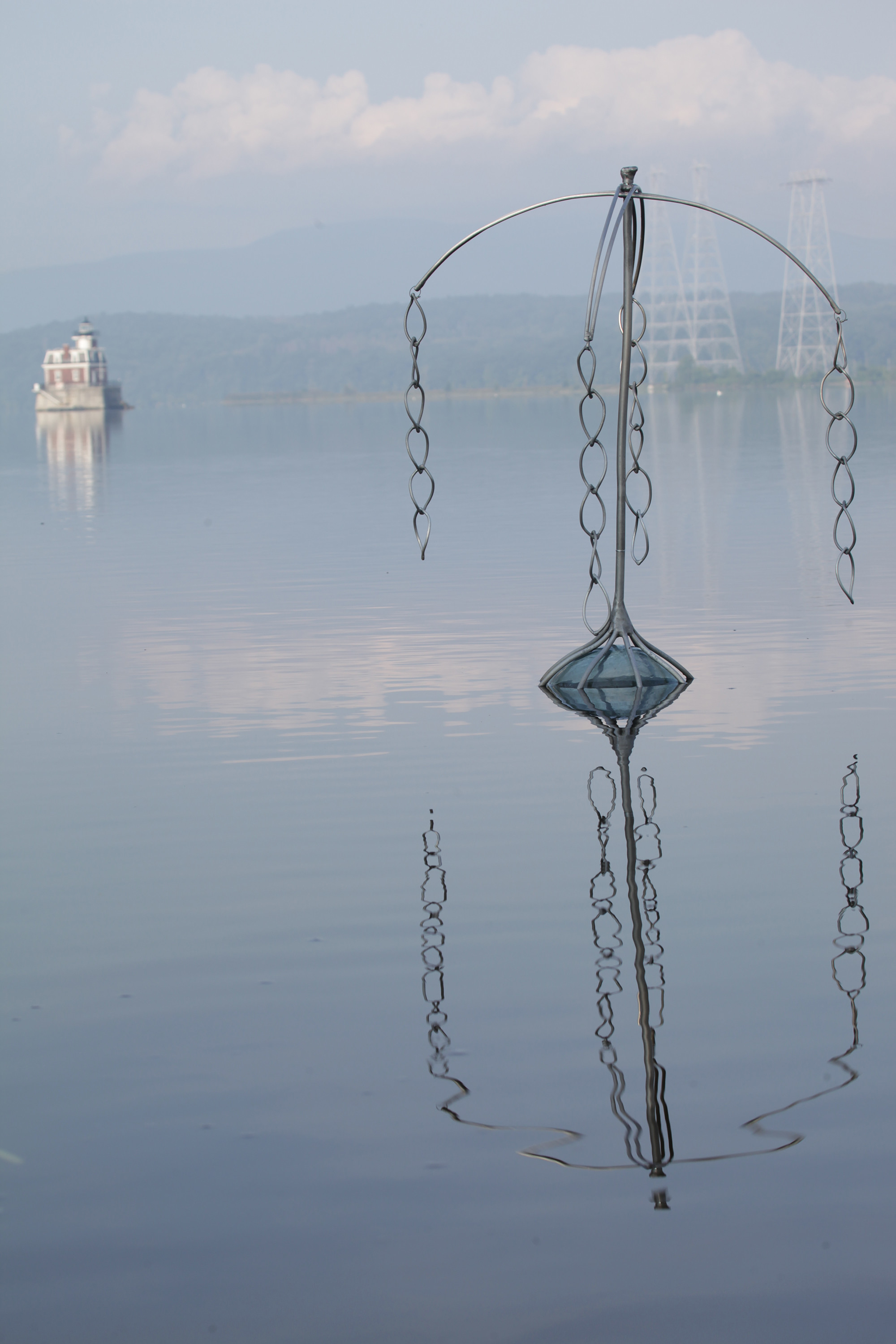
Daniel Rothbart, Water Clocks: A Floating Sculptural Installation in the Hudson River (detail), curated by Aaron Levi Garvey for The Hudson Eye, September 2021, Henry Hudson Riverfront Park, Southern Slip, Hudson, New York

Rothbart has exhibited at Andrea Meislin Gallery, Exit Art, WhiteBox, the Newhouse Center for Contemporary Art at Snug Harbor, and the LAB Gallery in New York City along with the Hudson Valley Center for Contemporary Art in Peekskill, New York and the Artists Residence Gallery in Herzliya, Israel. Studio projects include Inscrutable Theologies, Aachen, Germany; STREAMING II, The Frank Institute @ CR10, Linlithgo, New York; The Rumsey Street Project, Grand Rapids, Michigan; Air de Venise, Venice, Italy; WATERLINES, Galerie Depardieu, Nice, France; La Napoule Art Foundation, Mandelieu-la-Napoule, France. and RamleAnthropocene, the Pool of the Arches, Center for Contemporary Art Ramle CACR, Ramle, Israel. He exhibited in Ventisette artisti e una rivista, Galleria Nazionale d’Arte Moderna, Rome, Italy; Citydrift, Momenta Art, Brooklyn, New York; But I’m an American, Belgrade Cultural Centre, Serbia; The End of Language: Wittgenstein Reimagined, Museum of Contemporary Art, Belgrade, Serbia; and Meditation | Mediation, Life is Art Foundation, New Orleans, Louisiana.

Rothbart was awarded a New York Foundation for the Arts grant and a residency at La Napoule Art Foundation in 2002. He was awarded a New York State Council on the Arts grant and a residency at The Artists' Residence, Herzliya, Israel in 2023. His work is the subject of a monograph by Enrico Pedrini published in 2010 by Ulisse e Calipso of Naples, Italy. Rothbart's work can be found in public and private collections, including the artist's book collection of the Museum of Modern Art in New York.

In 2015, Rothbart wrote an essay and four commentaries on the theme of water-based performance as the lead section of PAJ 111, published by MIT Press. Rothbart is the author of three books. Jewish Metaphysics as Generative Principle in American Art (1994) explores the relationship between Jewish culture and post-war American abstraction. The Story of the Phoenix (1999) examines American cultural identity, Hollywood, and the transmutation of meaning through digital collages inhabited by his sculpture. Seeing Naples: Reports from the Shadow of Vesuvius (2018) is a book of travel writing inspired by Rothbart's experiences as a Fulbright scholar in Naples during the early 1990s. The work combines personal narrative with stories from the city's history, ancient and modern, that speak to Neapolitan values and culture. Poet and cultural critic Wayne Koestenbaum observes "Rothbart's narrative of Naples bears the freight of a melancholy intrinsic to the act of paying attention to a city that is older and wiser than we will ever live to be."

== Books ==
Richard Milazzo (Writer/Poet) and Daniel Rothbart (Writer/Collagist), More Fugitive Than Light: Poems of Rome, Venice, Paris, 2016-2017 (Tsukuda Island Press, 2024).

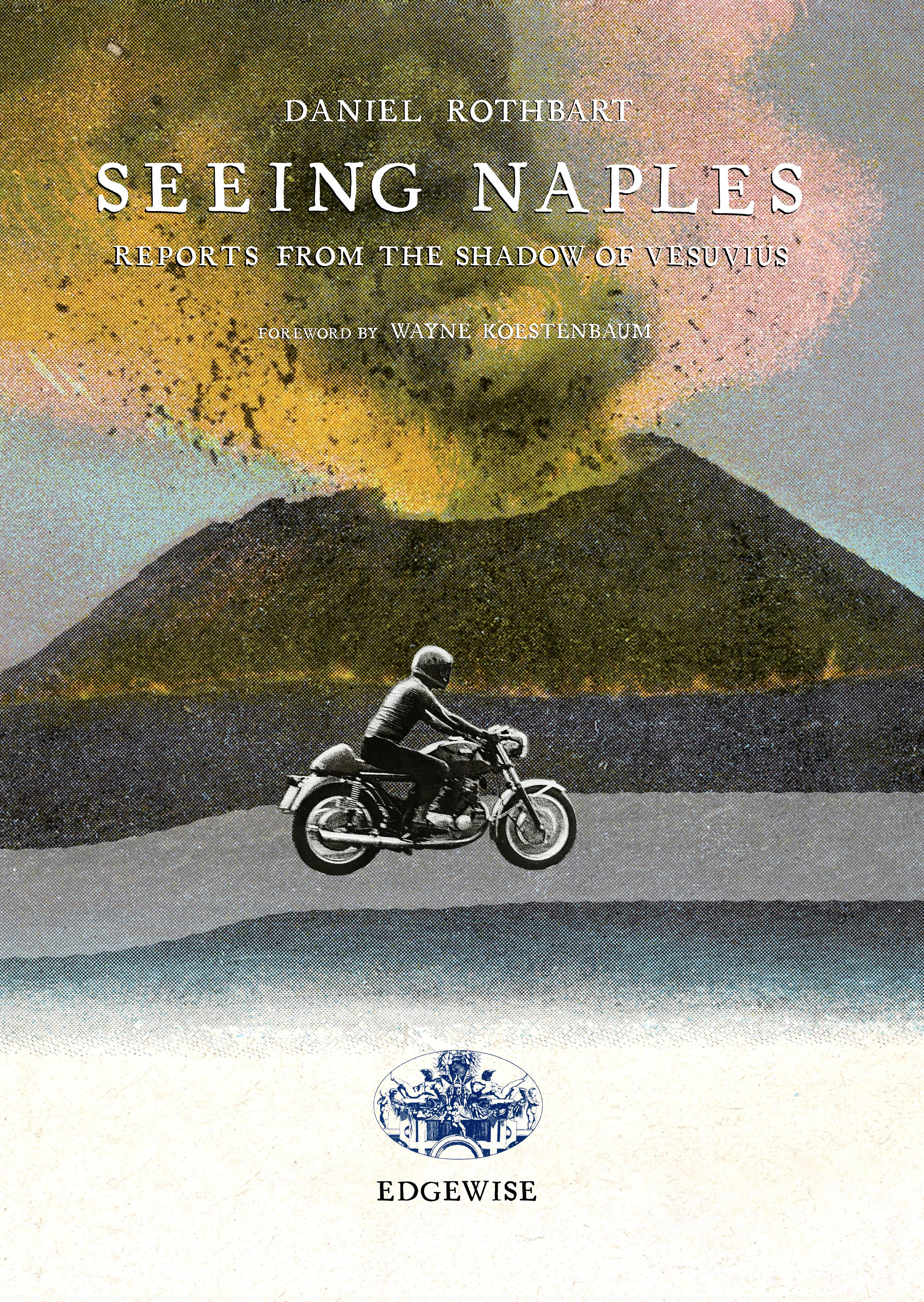
Cover of the book Seeing Naples: Reports from the Shadow of Vesuvius by Daniel Rothbart, foreword by Wayne Koestenbaum, New York: Edgewise Press, 2018, collage by DKR, conceived by Francine Hunter McGivern.

Seeing Naples: Reports from the Shadow of Vesuvius (Edgewise Press, 2018).

The Story of the Phoenix (Ulisse e Calipso, 1999).

Jewish Metaphysics as Generative Principle in American Art (Ulisse e Calipso, 1994).

== Bibliography ==
Gino Agnese, Ventisette artisti e una rivista. Galleria nazionale d'arte moderna e contemporanea, Tivoli: De Luca Editore, 2014.

Enrico Pedrini, John Perreault, Varda Genossar (Writers), and Daniel Rothbart (Artist, Interviewee), Daniel Rothbart: Works 1988 – 2009, Naples: Ulisse e Calipso, 2010.

Simonetta Lux and Şükran Moral, Arte ipercontemporanea. Un certo loro sguardo... Ulteriori protocolli dell'arte contemporanea, Rome: Gangemi Editore, 2006.

Richard Milazzo, Caravaggio on the Beach. Essays on Art in the 1990's, Tangier: Éditions d'Afrique du Nord, 2001.

Carla Subrizi (Writer) and Daniel Rothbart (Artist, Book Designer), Worlds, Rome: Lee Arthur Studio (New York, N.Y.), Galleria Planita (Rome, Italy), 1994.
