= Vistarino =

- Comune
- Comune di Vistarino
- Location within Italy Location within Lombardy
- Coordinates: 45°12′N 9°19′E
- Country: Italy
- Region: Lombardy
- Province: Pavia (PV)
- Frazioni: Vivente

Government
  - Mayor: Virginio Dagrada

Area
  - Total: 9.2 km^{2} (3.6 sq mi)
- Elevation: 72 m (236 ft)

Population (31 December 2010).
  - Total: 1,569
  - Density: 170/km^{2} (440/sq mi)
- Demonym: Vistarinesi
- Time zone: UTC+1 (CET)
  - Summer (DST): UTC+2 (CEST)
- Postal code: 27010
- Dialing code: 0382
- Website: Official website

Vistarino is a comune (municipality) in the Province of Pavia in the Italian region Lombardy, located about 30 km (19 mi) southeast of Milan and about 13 km (8.1 mi) east of Pavia.

Vistarino borders the following municipalities: Albuzzano, Copiano, Cura Carpignano, Filighera, Magherno, Marzano, Roncaro, Torre d'Arese.
