= Torre d'Arese =

- Comune
- Comune di Torre d'Arese
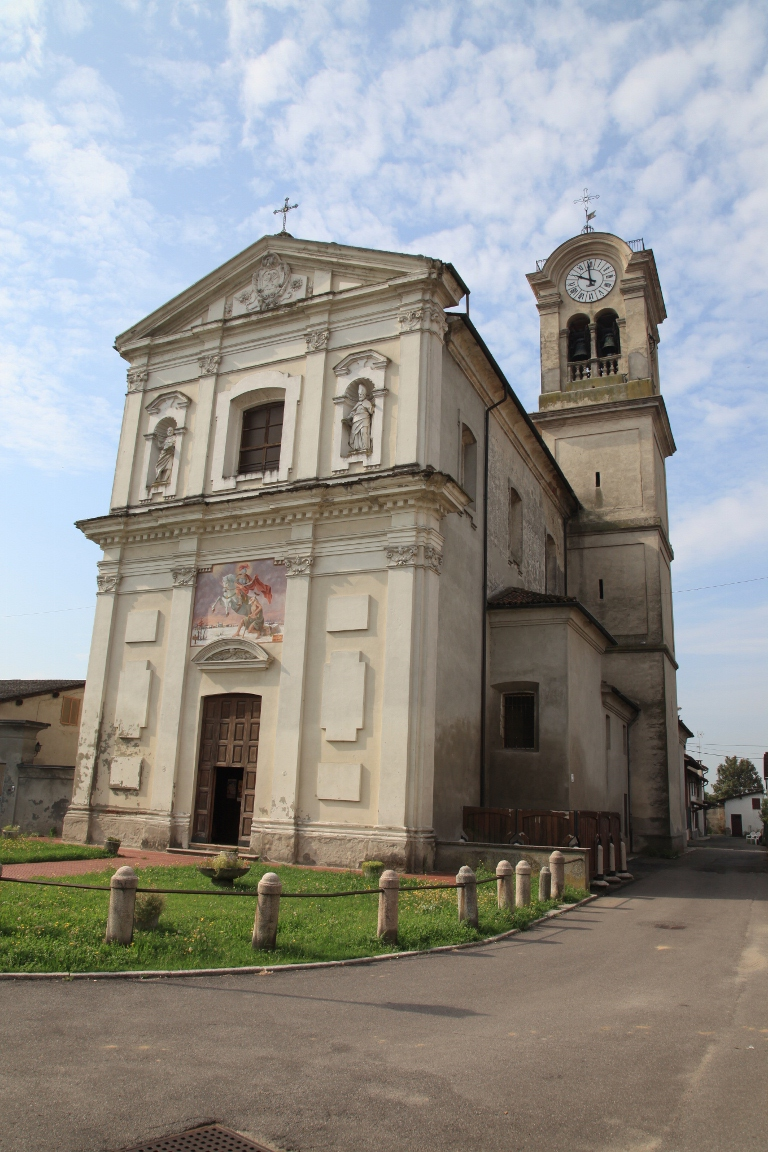

- Coat of arms

- Location within Italy Location within Lombardy
- Coordinates: 45°15′N 9°19′E
- Country: Italy
- Region: Lombardy
- Province: Pavia (PV)
- Frazioni: Cascina Maggiore

Government
  - Mayor: Graziano Molina

Area
  - Total: 4.49 km^{2} (1.73 sq mi)
- Elevation: 78 m (256 ft)

Population (31 December 2010)
  - Total: 980
  - Density: 220/km^{2} (570/sq mi)
- Demonym: Torresi
- Time zone: UTC+1 (CET)
  - Summer (DST): UTC+2 (CEST)
- Postal code: 27010
- Dialing code: 0382
- Website: Official website

Torre d'Arese is a comune (municipality) in the Province of Pavia in the Italian region Lombardy, located about 25 km southeast of Milan and about 15 km northeast of Pavia.

Torre d'Arese borders the following municipalities: Magherno, Marzano, Valera Fratta, Villanterio, Vistarino.
