= Villanterio =

- Comune
- Comune di Villanterio
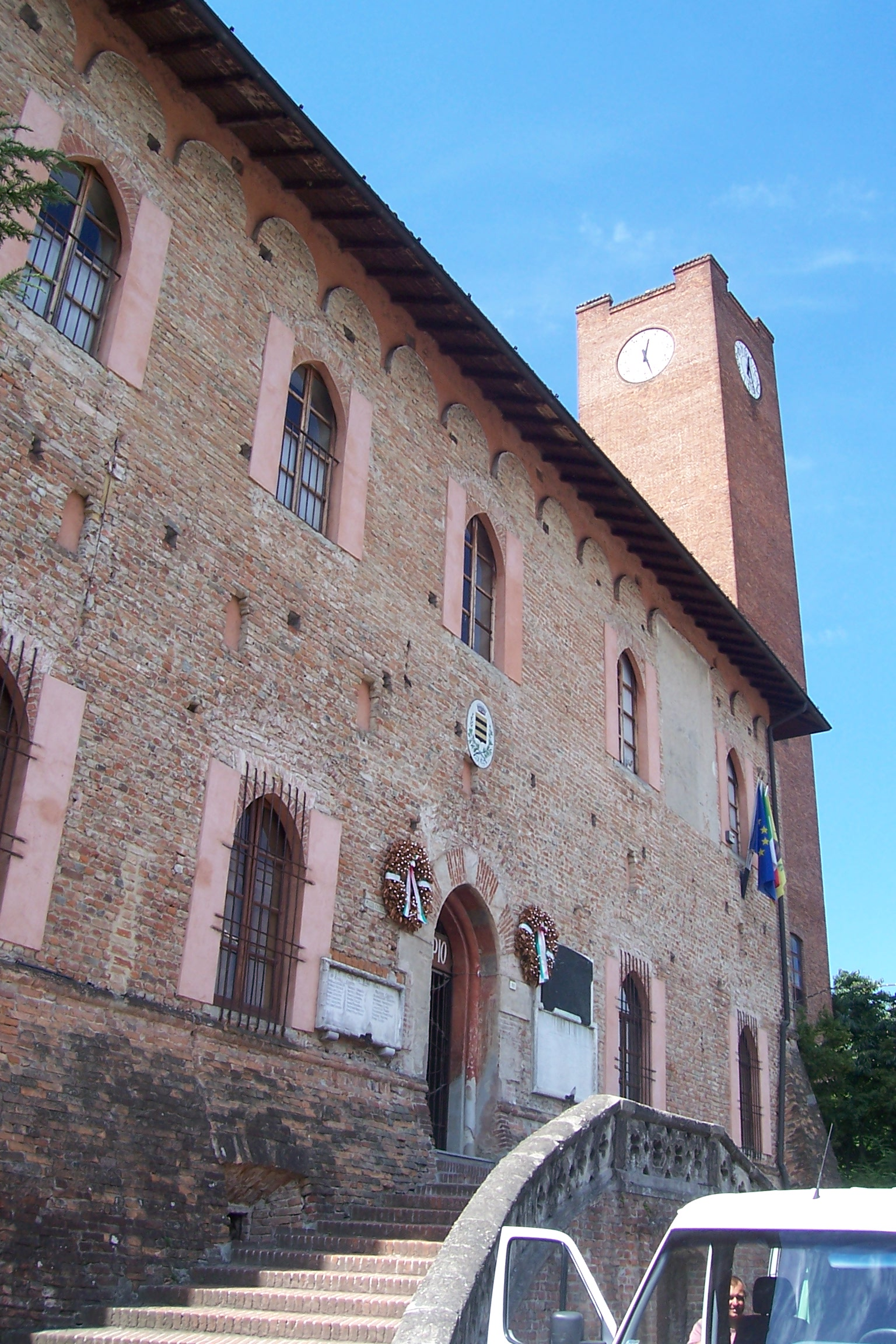

- Coat of arms

- Location within Italy Location within Lombardy
- Coordinates: 45°13′N 9°22′E
- Country: Italy
- Region: Lombardy
- Province: Pavia (PV)

Government
  - Mayor: Silvio Corbellini

Area
  - Total: 14.5 km^{2} (5.6 sq mi)
- Elevation: 75 m (246 ft)

Population (31 December 2010)
  - Total: 3,226
  - Density: 222/km^{2} (576/sq mi)
- Demonym: Villanteresi
- Time zone: UTC+1 (CET)
  - Summer (DST): UTC+2 (CEST)
- Postal code: 27019
- Dialing code: 0382
- Website: Official website

Villanterio is a comune (municipality) in the Province of Pavia in the Italian region Lombardy, located about 30 km southeast of Milan and about 15 km east of Pavia.

Villanterio borders the following municipalities: Gerenzago, Inverno e Monteleone, Magherno, Marudo, Sant'Angelo Lodigiano, Torre d'Arese, Valera Fratta.
