= Filighera =

- Comune
- Comune di Filighera
- Location within Italy Location within Lombardy
- Coordinates: 45°11′N 9°19′E
- Country: Italy
- Region: Lombardy
- Province: Province of Pavia (PV)
- Frazioni: Fanese, Montesano, Ca' Lepre, Case Nuove, Beatico inferiore e superiore, C.na Nuova, C.na Sacchina, C.na Fornace

Government
  - Mayor: Alessandro Pettinari

Area
  - Total: 8.2 km^{2} (3.2 sq mi)

Population (31 August 2017)
  - Total: 840
  - Density: 100/km^{2} (270/sq mi)
- Demonym: Filigheresi
- Time zone: UTC+1 (CET)
  - Summer (DST): UTC+2 (CEST)
- Postal code: 27010
- Dialing code: 0382
- Patron saint: St. Joseph
- Saint day: March 19
- Website: Official website

Filighera is a comune (municipality) in the Province of Pavia in the Italian region Lombardy, located about 35 km (22 mi) southeast of Milan and about 13 km (8.1 mi) east of Pavia.

Filighera borders the following municipalities: Albuzzano, Belgioioso, Copiano, Corteolona e Genzone, Vistarino.
