= Mary K. Rothbart =

- Born: May 22, 1940 (age 85); Lewistown, Montana
- Awards: G. Stanley Hall Award For Distinguished Scientific Contributions to Child Development (American Psychological Association); Society for Research in Child Development Award for Distinguished Scientific Contributions; Gold Medal Award for Life Achievement Psychology in the Science of Psychology (American Psychological Foundation)

Mary Klevjord Rothbart (born May 22, 1940, in Lewistown, Montana) is professor emerita of psychology at the University of Oregon. She is known for her research in the fields of temperament and social development, emotional development, and development of attention. She was a co-founder of Birth to Three, a parent support and education program. She has written over 159 articles related to educational psychology, developmental psychology, developmental cognitive neuroscience and biological psychology. Rothbart has also authored and co-authored many books, including Becoming Who We Are, for which she received the Eleanor Maccoby Book Award from the American Psychological Association. Two other popular volumes by Rothbart are Temperament, a Handbook of Child Psychology, and Attention in Early Development: Themes and Variations.

== Personal life ==
Rothbart was born in Lewistown, Montana, in May 1940 and named Mary Louise Klevjord. Her father, whose family came from Norway, was a teacher and her mother was a housewife. Rothbart was the oldest of four daughters. Though born in Montana, Rothbart's father joined the civil service of the Air Force during World War II, which resulted in most of her early years living in Washington and Utah. After attending high school in Utah, she then enrolled at Reed College in Portland, Oregon. This is where her love of learning was strengthened and where she met her husband Myron Rothbart, a social psychologist. After graduating, both Rothbarts went to Stanford, where she graduated with a doctoral degree in developmental psychology. While at Stanford Rothbart gave birth to her first son Daniel Rothbart, and 20 months later her second son Michael Rothbart. Her second son was born in Montreal, where Rothbart's husband was teaching. During her sons' early years, she took three years off to stay at home with them, which led her to research the development of temperament of children. She had looked into what research was available on child temperament at the time and there was not much work beyond an early study by Alexander Thomas and Stella Chess (New York Longitudinal Study). She would go on to spend countless hours interviewing and observing children and their emotional responses to outside stimuli in the process of developing the Infant Behavior Questionnaire in to assess temperament in small children. Rothbart then accepted a teaching position from the University of Oregon, where she spent the rest of her teaching and research career. She is now retired from her teaching career, but continues to conduct research.

== Education ==
Rothbart earned her B.A in psychology (1962) from Reed College in Portland, Oregon. She went on to earn her Ph.D. in psychology (1966) from Stanford University. Rothbart worked closely with developmental psychologist Eleanor Maccoby who served as her major advisor and mentor while she attended Stanford University. She has dedicated most of her work to the study of child development and temperament.

== Professional career ==
After receiving her Ph.D., Rothbart became a faculty member at the University of Oregon, where she conducted research on the development of emotions and attention in early childhood and infancy. She is best known for her research on individual differences in children's temperament. Although her first focus was on researching with infants, Rothbart also conducted research on temperament in early childhood to adolescence, and ultimately to adulthood. Rothbart has also conducted research on attention, the development of emotions, and social development.

Rothbart retired as a professor emerita of psychology from the University of Oregon. Although retired, Rothbart continues to work with her peers including Dr. Michael Posner in her field of expertise. Rothbart continues to focus on educational and developmental psychology.

== Contributions ==
Rothbart is a leading expert in infant temperament and development and has authored many articles and books on this subject. She drew generalizations about the development of temperament in small children by identifying emotional, motor and attentional reactions. Rothbart developed parent- and self-report questionnaires for assessing temperament in infancy, childhood, early adolescence, and adulthood. She has also developed standardized laboratory assessments of temperament, and has conducted extensive laboratory work on the early development of the emotions, impulsivity, activity, and attention. In her work, she identified the temperament variable of "effortful control" used to inhibit a dominant response in order to perform a subdominant response. Effortful control consisted of abilities required to voluntarily manage attention regulation. This work examined the development of control behaviors needed to adapt to situations and suppress impulsivity, especially when the child did not particularly want to do so.

Her methods of assessing infant temperament would evolve into the Infant Behavior Questionnaire, developed in 1981 and in a revised form still widely used today. This technique is commonly used among researchers studying infant behavior and temperament.

Using this questionnaire in combination with home and laboratory observations has helped infant researchers obtain more accurate data on their participants. Rothbart also uses self-report surveys for her participants, but only when she is assessing participants who are old enough to give accurate self-report data.

Rothbart conducted important research with Doug Derryberry to observe the emotional reactions and the different temperaments of children. Another important collaboration involved psychologist Michael Posner, and resulted in a number of seminal papers on development of self-regulation, as well as publication of the book Educating the Human Brain.

=== Cognitive development ===
Rothbart has also done significant research on cognitive development. In 2007 she researched the differences in the human brain and how it changes over the years. She also did research on differences in education style and how this influences development. She also worked within the realm of social psychology in 2011 doing research on the brain states involved in hypnosis. She has used her knowledge of temperament in the varying ages of individuals and has begun applying it to other areas of psychology. In 2015 Rothbart did research involving the use of temperament in how mental disorders are viewed and categorized. Her most recent work done in 2016 was the role of temperament in personality.

=== Birth to Three ===
Rothbart is also a co-founder of Birth to Three, a program that serves infants and their families through parent education. This program has helped reach parents and children across the United States to offer support and education for infant development. Because of her tremendous contributions to the Birth to Three program, Rothbart was awarded the Birth to Three's Champion of Children award.

== Awards ==
Dr. Rothbart has received several awards for her contributions in social and developmental psychology. In 2009, she received the Gold Medal Award for Life Achievement in the Science of Psychology from the American Psychological Foundation. She is also the recipient of the Block Award from the Society of Personality and Social Psychology, the Award for Distinguished Scientific Contributions to Child Development from the Society for Research in Child Development, and the G. Stanley Hall Award for Distinguished Contribution to Developmental Psychology from the American Psychological Association.

Dr. Rothbart was also awarded the Elenor Maccoby Book Award from Division 7 (Developmental Psychology) of the American Psychological Association for her book Becoming Who We Are. This book discusses the role of temperament in developing personality traits as well as biological and social influences on temperament. Becoming Who We Are combines theories of temperament with research that Rothbart and other leading temperament researchers have conducted in order to give more detail about temperament and its implications in later life. She also discusses intervention plans in order to help children who develop behavior problems.

=== Other major awards ===
- Birth to Three's Champion of Children Award (Birth to Three)
- Block Award (SPSP) award for research accomplishment in personality research.
