= Genzone =

- Frazione
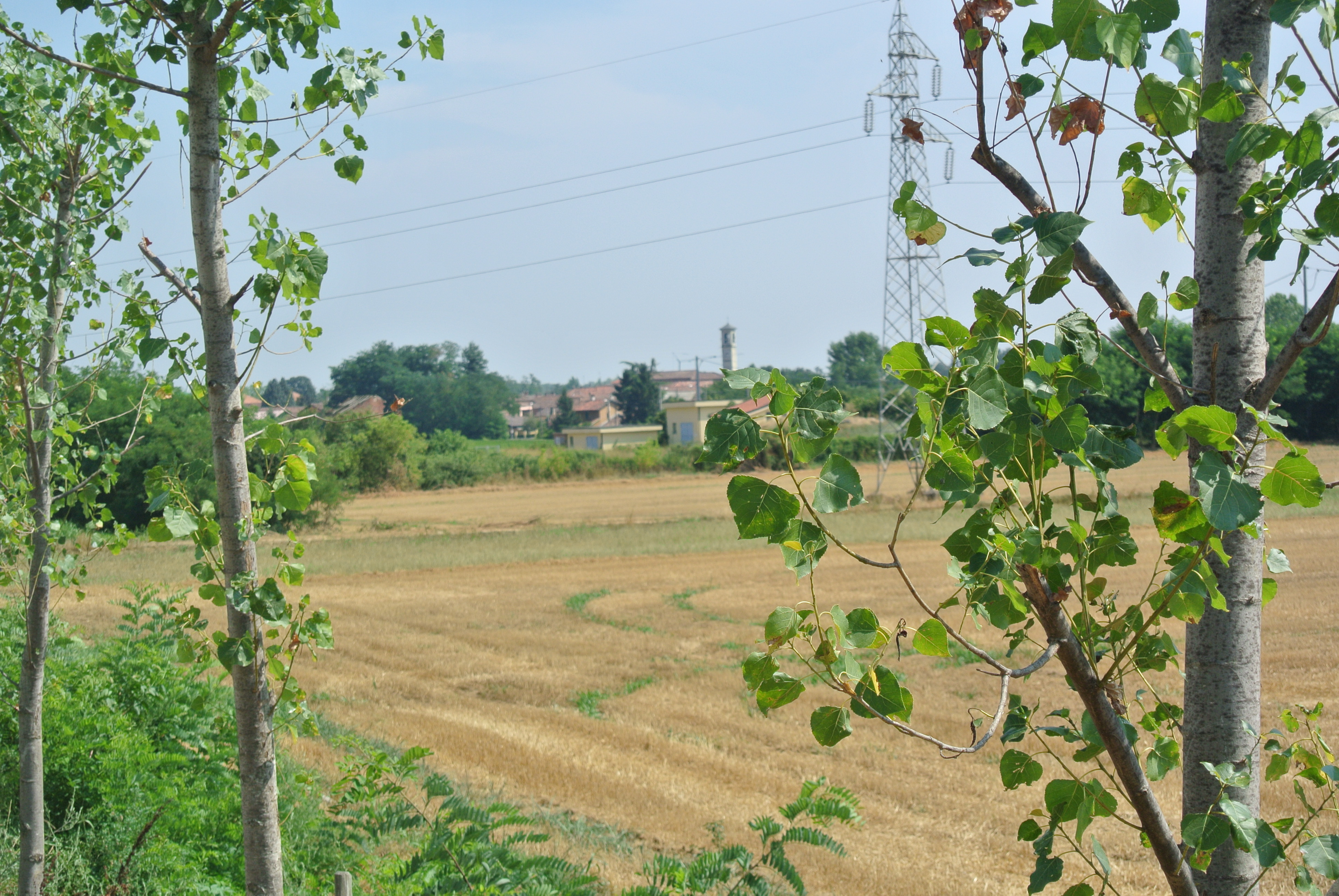

- Location of Genzone in Italy
- Coordinates: 45°11′N 9°21′E
- Country: Italy
- Region: Lombardy
- Province: Pavia (PV)
- Comune: Corteolona e Genzone
- Elevation: 72 m (236 ft)

Population (Dec. 2004)
  - Total: 348
- Time zone: UTC+1 (CET)
  - Summer (DST): UTC+2 (CEST)
- Postal code: 27014
- Dialing code: 0382

Genzone is a frazione of the comune (municipality) of Corteolona e Genzone in the Province of Pavia in the Italian region Lombardy, located about 35 km southeast of Milan and about 15 km east of Pavia. It was a separate comune until 2016.
