= Corteolona =

- Frazione
- Comune di Corteolona
- Location of Corteolona in Italy
- Coordinates: 45°9′N 9°22′E
- Country: Italy
- Region: Lombardy
- Province: Pavia (PV)
- Comune: Corteolona e Genzone
- Elevation: 71 m (233 ft)
- Time zone: UTC+1 (CET)
  - Summer (DST): UTC+2 (CEST)
- Postal code: 27014
- Dialing code: 0382

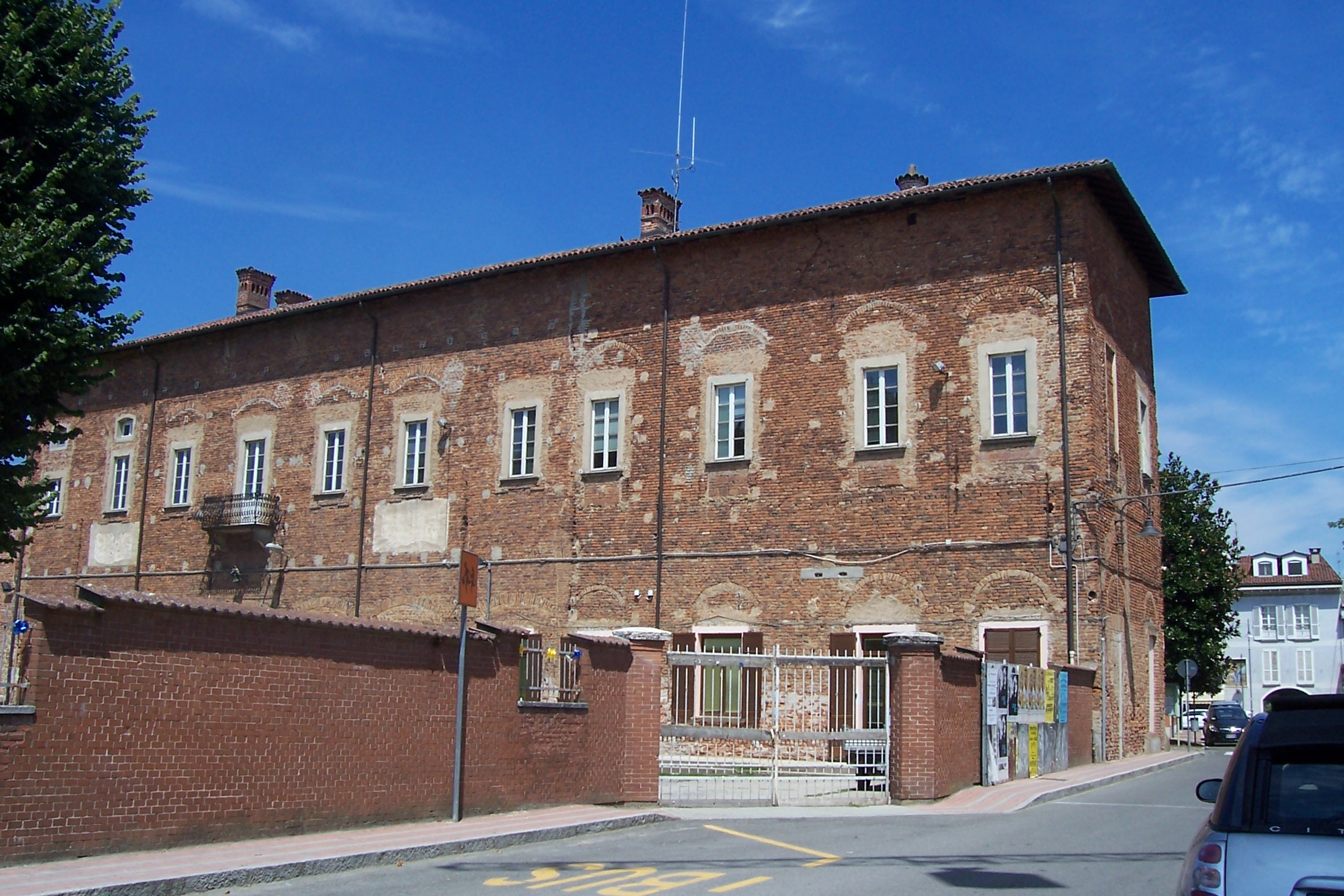

Corteolona is a frazione of the comune (municipality) of Corteolona e Genzone in the Province of Pavia in the Italian region Lombardy, located about 40 km southeast of Milan and about 15 km east of Pavia. It was a separate comune until 2016.
