= Abbey of Saint John in Argentella =

Abbey in Palombara Sabina, Italy

Coordinates: 42.0551°N 12.7524°E

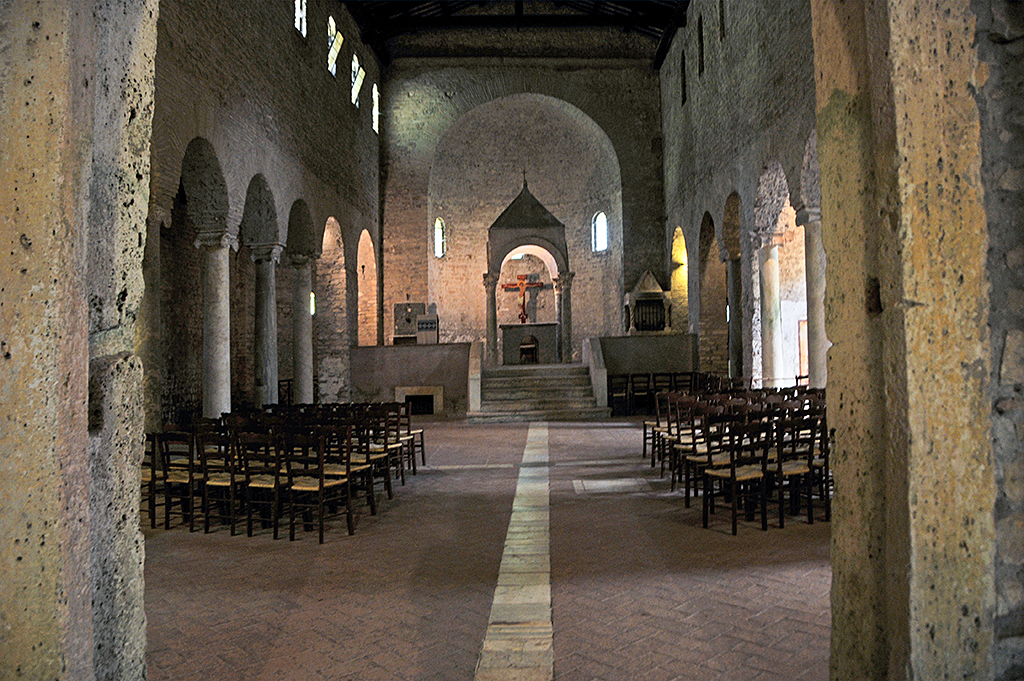
Interior of San Giovanni in Argentella

The abbey of Saint John in Argentella (in Italian Abbazia di San Giovanni in Argentella) is a site in Palombara Sabina, in province of Rome, central Italy.

== History ==
The foundation of the church is attributed to the Lombards, around 529. The name in Argentella derives a spring of water in the near zone (maybe that of the Long Valley, in Italian Valle Lunga).

A Roman villa or temple existed nearby, and perhaps part of its materials were re-used for the construction. In the 11th century the abbey was renewed. From 1284 to 1445, by order of the bishop and Lord of Palombara Sabina Jacopo Savelli, the abbey was administered by the Hermits of Saint William. In 1895, the church was declared an Italian National Monument.
