= Monastery of San Felice =

Monastery in Pavia, Italy

Coordinates: 45°11′18″N 9°9′8″E

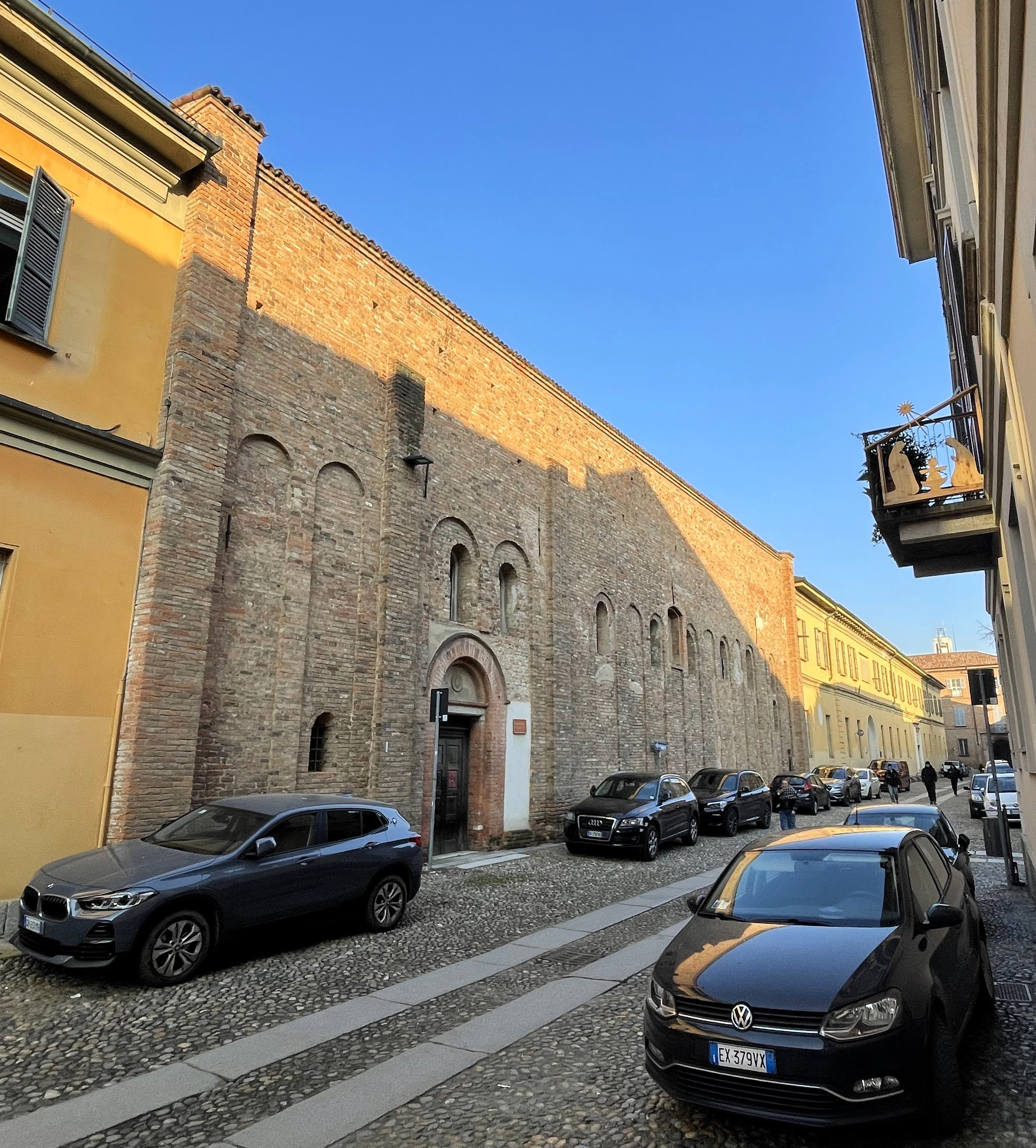
- The exterior of the monastery

Religion
- Affiliation: Catholic
- Province: Pavia
- Year consecrated: 8th century
- Status: Active

Location
- Location: Pavia, Italy
- Interactive map of Monastery of San Felice

Architecture
- Type: Church

The Monastery of San Felice was one of the main female Benedictine monasteries of Pavia. Founded during the Lombard period, it was suppressed in the 18th century. Part of the church and the crypt survive from the original Lombard complex.

== History ==
The first attestation of this monastery dates back to 760, when the Lombard king Desiderius and his wife, Queen Ansa, donated it to the monastery of Santa Giulia in Brescia. The institution was confirmed in 851 as a dependency of the Brescia monastery with the name of the Queen: Lothair and Louis the German donated it to Gisela, Lothair's daughter. In 868 the monastery was donated by Emperor Louis the German to his wife Engelberga, a possession confirmed by King Arnulf of Carinthia in 889. In 890 Æthelswith, sister of the English king Alfred the Great and wife of the king of Mercia Burgred, who died while she was in Pavia in 888, was buried inside. In 891 Guy III of Spoleto donated the monastery to his wife Ageltrude and in that year the dependence of the Pavia monastery from the Brescia one ceased.

The institution then passed under the control of the kings of the Ottonian dynasty: a plaque placed inside the church recalls the building interventions sponsored by Emperor Otto III in 980. The same sovereign in 1001 confirmed to the monastery the privileges and donations obtained by the previous kings and emperors, remembering also that the institution kept a relic of the wood of the Cross, together with the remains of the Dalmatian martyr Felix. The monastery received numerous imperial donations and diplomas of immunity and confirmation of its possessions by the emperors Otto III, Henry II, Conrad II, Henry IV. In particular, with the diploma of Emperor Henry II in 1014, the monastery obtained goods on Lake Maggiore, in Coronate, Voghera, Travacò Siccomario, Pieve Porto Morone and Tromello. In the 15th century the monastery went through a phase of great development and obtained possessions and rights from Filippo Maria Visconti, Bianca Maria Visconti, Bona of Savoy and Ludovico Sforza. In the same period, the importance of the monastery attracted among the nuns several young representatives of the major noble families of the city, such as the abbess Andriola de 'Barrachis, who ruled the monastery between 1446 and 1506. Andriola, who was also a painter ( some of her works are preserved in the Civic Museums), and welcoming among the nuns exponents of the major urban lineages, such as the abbess Andriola de 'Barrachis (documented between 1446 and 1506), a talented painter (in the Civic museums of Pavia two of her paintings), who around 1490 had a large part of the monastery rebuilt in Renaissance style. The monastery was suppressed in 1785, when there were still 60 nuns in the monastery. After the suppression, the Austrian government commissioned the architect Leopoldo Pollack to transform the monastery into an orphanage (the sober neoclassical facade on Piazza Botta was given to Pollack). The orphanage was active from 1792 until about 1950, when it was ceded to the university of Pavia. It currently houses the Departments of Philosophy and Psychology and the Department of Economics.

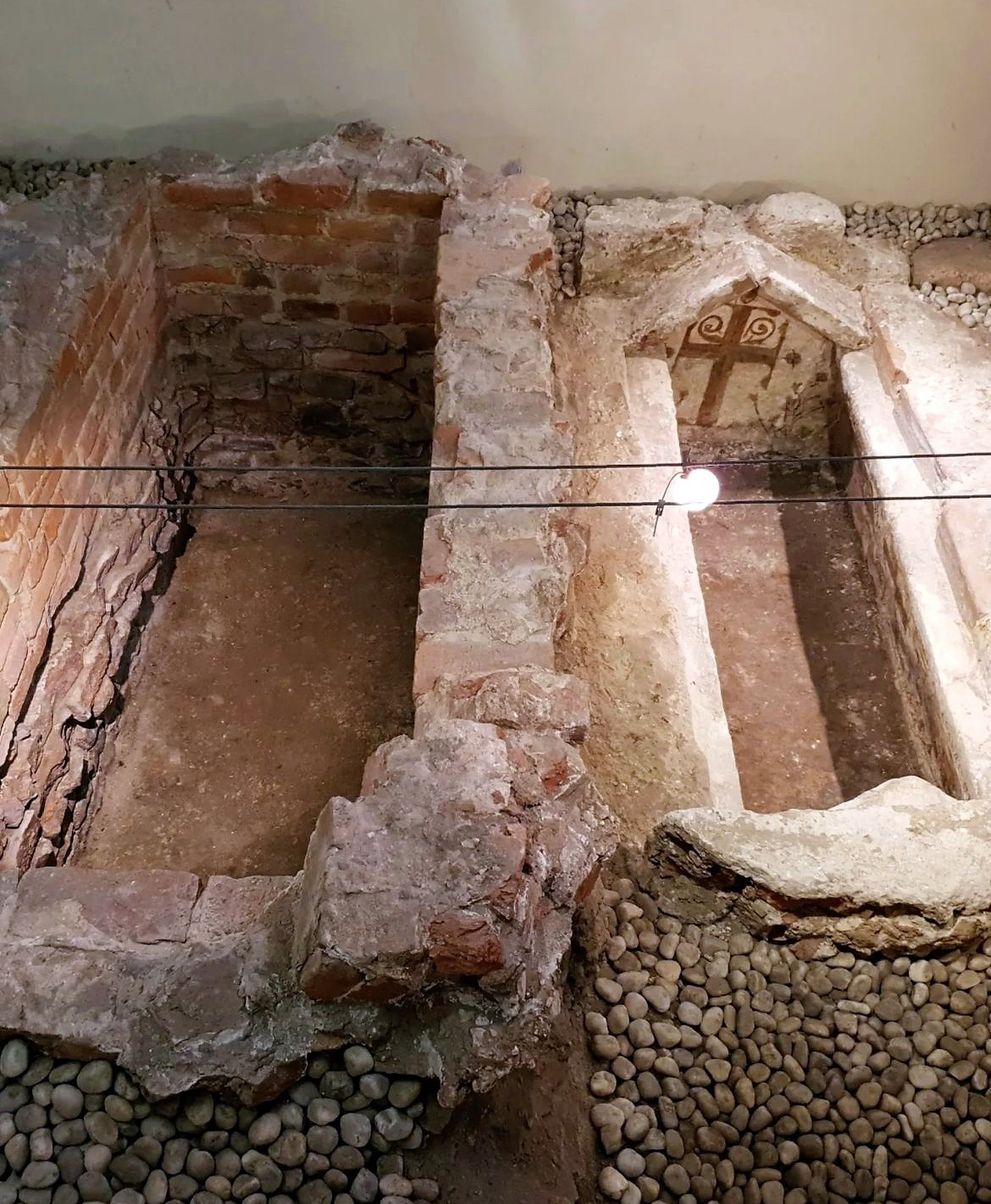
Lombard tombs found inside the church.

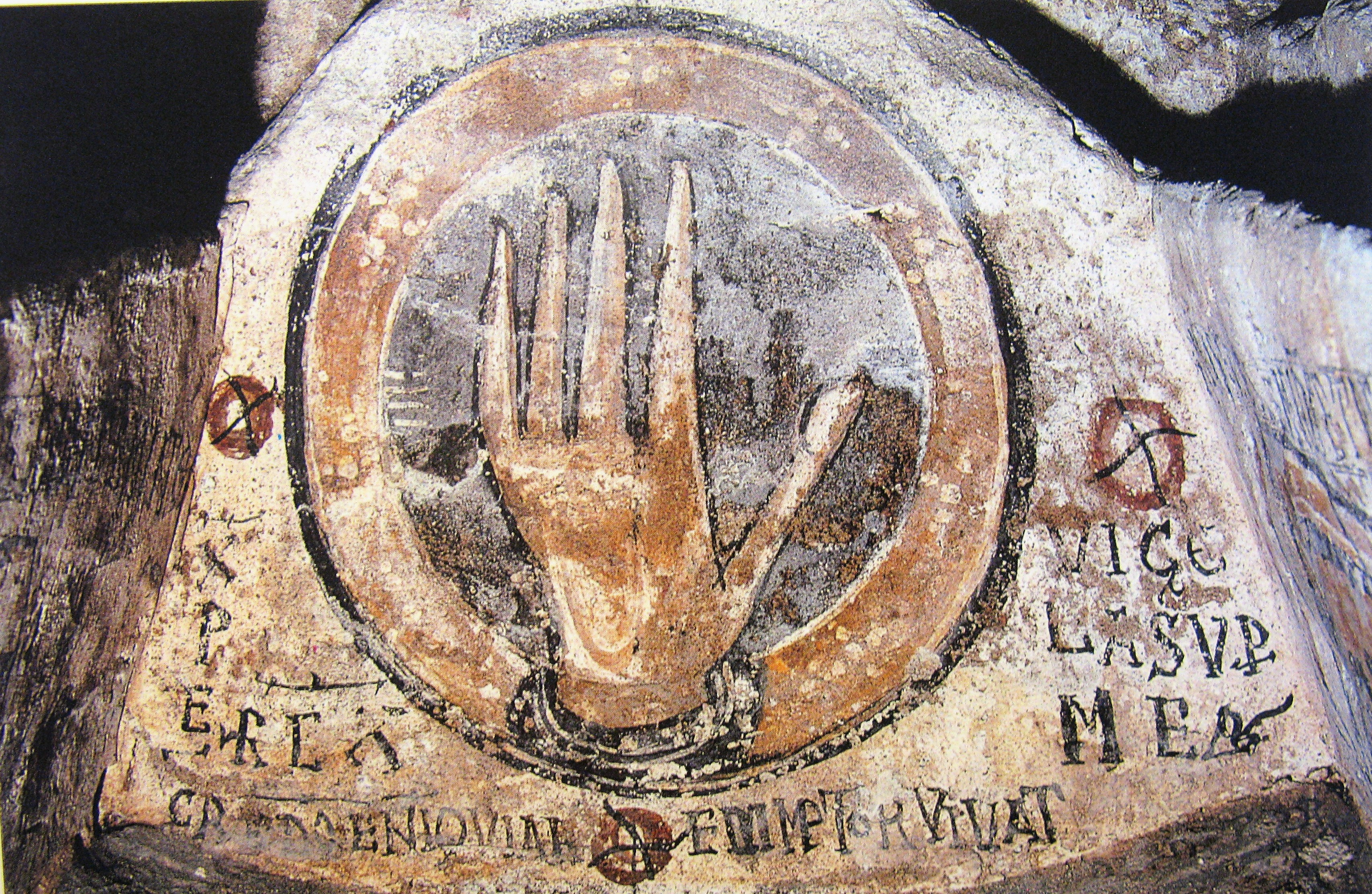
The decorations of one of the tombs (8th century).

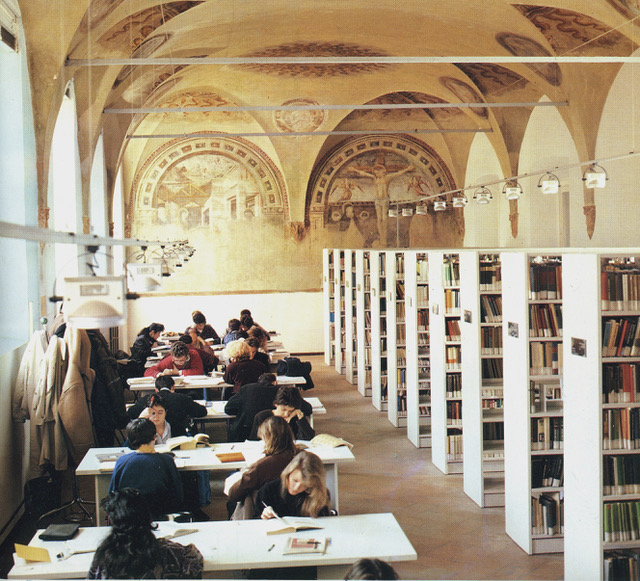
Library of the Faculty of Economics.

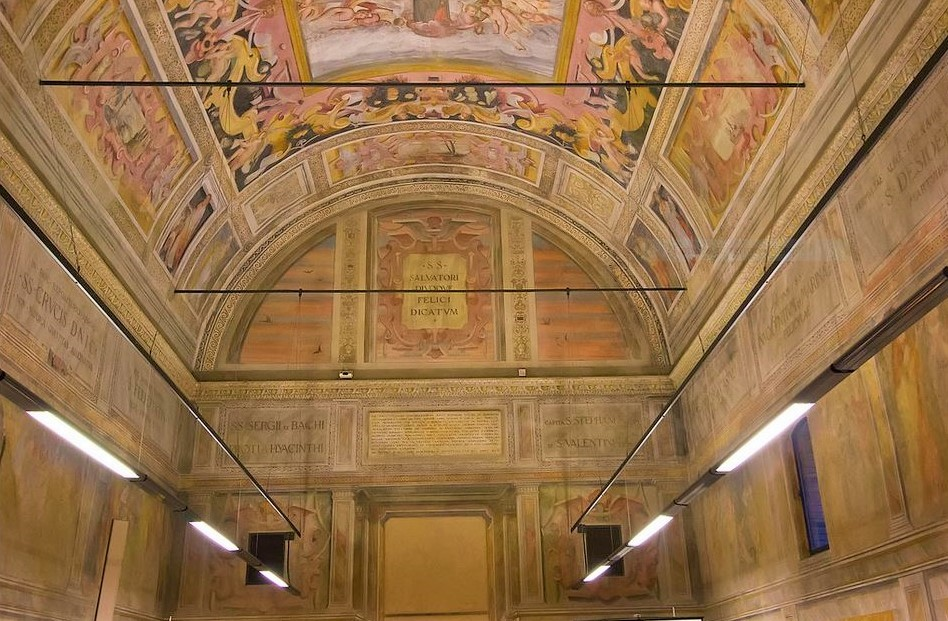
The interior of the former church.

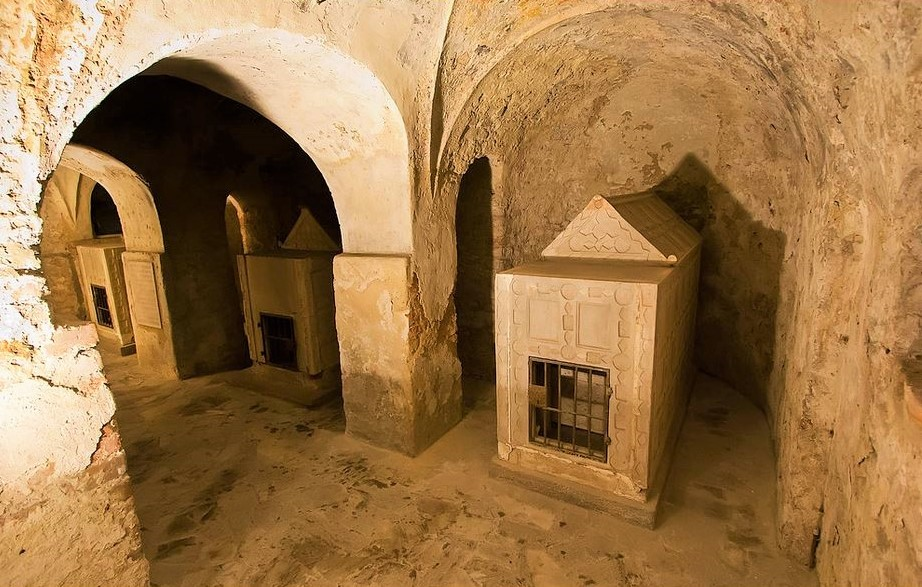
The crypt with the arks (10th century).

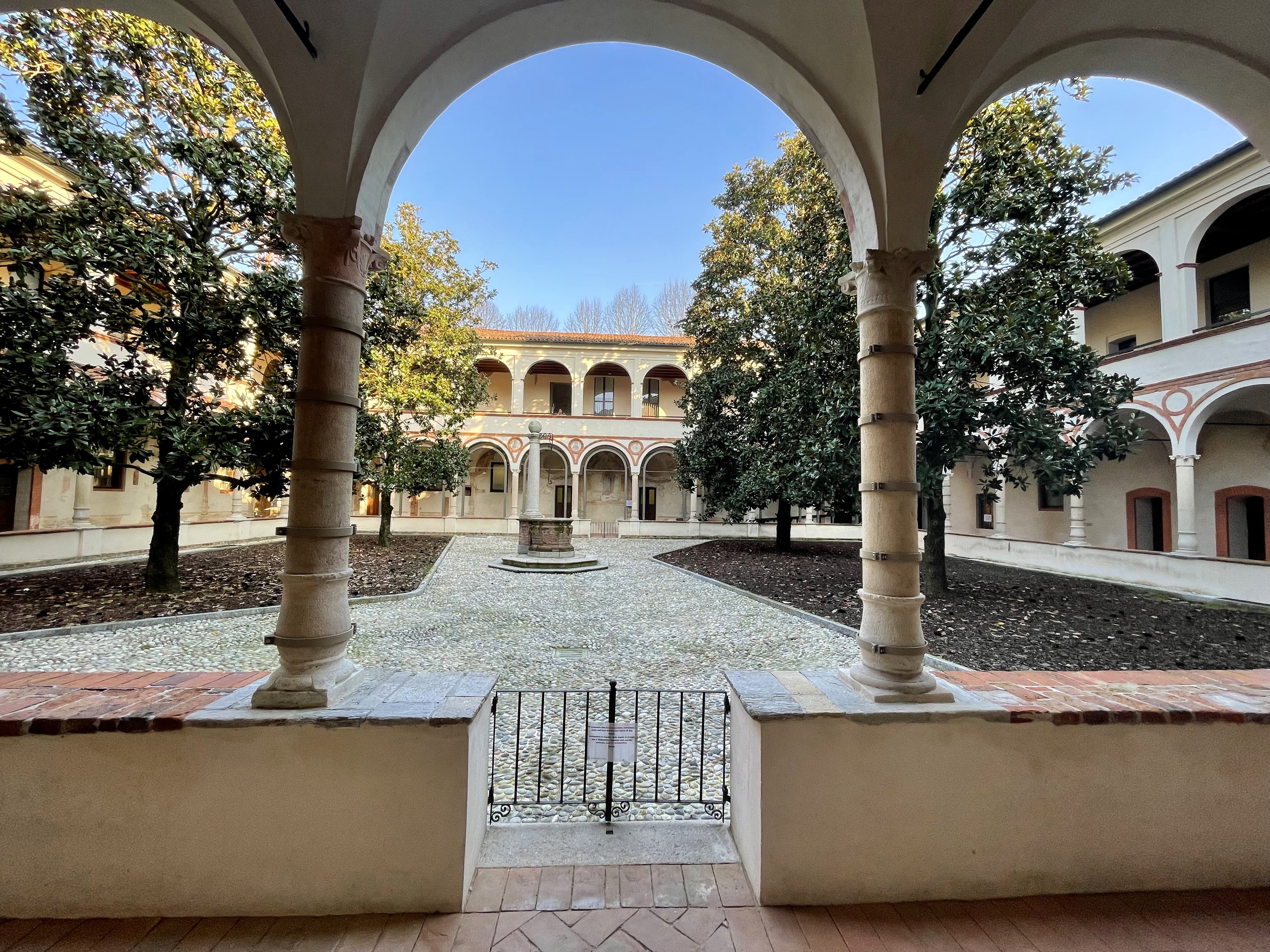
The cloister, 1493-1500.

== Architecture ==
Recent archaeological excavations have allowed us to reconstruct the architectural events of the church with greater precision, which datable around the middle of the eighth century and was built on the remains of late Roman buildings. Originally the building had a single hall and equipped with three apses and provided an atrium outside, intended as a sepulchral area, incorporated into the church in the 10th century. During the excavations of 1996/97 eight tombs were found (while other burials came to light on via San Felice), some of which are internally frescoed with sacred images and which are visible inside the university hall that occupies the space of the former church. These burials date back to the eighth century and in one of them there is an inscription with the name of the abbess Ariperga while in another tomb the skeleton of a nun was found accompanied by a gilded bronze ring with an embedded gem and leather shoes at the feet.

Externally, along via San Felice, you can still see the 8th and 9th century masonry of the church, characterized by high blind arches with small windows. The building underwent interventions in the Renaissance and modern times, such as the creation of a loggia to house the nuns' choir around 1490. In the seventeenth century the church was lengthened and completely re-frescoed. The writings along the walls that list the relics contained in the sacred building also date back to these interventions. In 1611 the abbess Bianca Felicita Parata of Crema had the epigraph transcribed on the north wall of the church with which they remembered the building interventions wanted by Emperor Otto I.

Below the church is one of the main examples of early medieval architecture in Pavia: the crypt. The environment is equipped with a corridor and provided with three apses and niches carved into the side walls. The crypt has two has two entrances, placed on both sides of it, in order to allow the descent and ascent during the rites and processions. Inside the crypt there are large reliquary arks in white marble, with a gabled roof, dating back to the 10th century and, probably, the rare remains of green and black plaster on the vault of the room also date back to the same period. Near the church there is also a large Renaissance cloister. The cloister was built between 1493 and 1500. A capital preserves an inscription that recalled how the abbess Andriola de’ Barrachis had the work done in the year 1500. The cloister, in Renaissance style, is equipped with 30 columns in marble with capitals, terracotta decorations of the arches and clypei in which busts of nuns are frescoed. Even in the arches and walls there are remains of frescoes, mostly dating back to the 16th century, while in the northern part of the cloister there is a brick pillar, the only surviving element of the previous Romanesque cloister.

== Bibliography ==
- Musei Civici di Pavia. Pavia longobarda e capitale di regno. Secoli VI- X, a cura di Saverio Lomartire, Davide Tolomelli, Skira, Milano, 2017.
- Ricerche sulla ex-Chiesa di San Felice in Pavia, ETS, Pisa, 2003.
- Giovanna Forzatti Golia, Istituzioni ecclesiastiche pavesi dall'età longobarda alla dominazione visconteo- sforzesca, Roma, Herder, 2002.
- Saverio Lomartire, Anna Segagni, Tomba della badessa Ariperga, in Il futuro dei Longobardi: l'Italia e la costruzione dell'Europa di Carlo Magno, Skira, Milano, 2000.
- Rosanina Invernizzi, Ex chiesa di San Felice, in “Annali di Storia Pavese”, XXVI (1998).
- Aldo A. Settia, Pavia carolingia e postcarolingia, in Storia di Pavia, II, L'alto medioevo, Milano, Banca del Monte di Lombardia, 1987.
