= Corteolona e Genzone =

- Comune
- Comune di Corteolona e Genzone
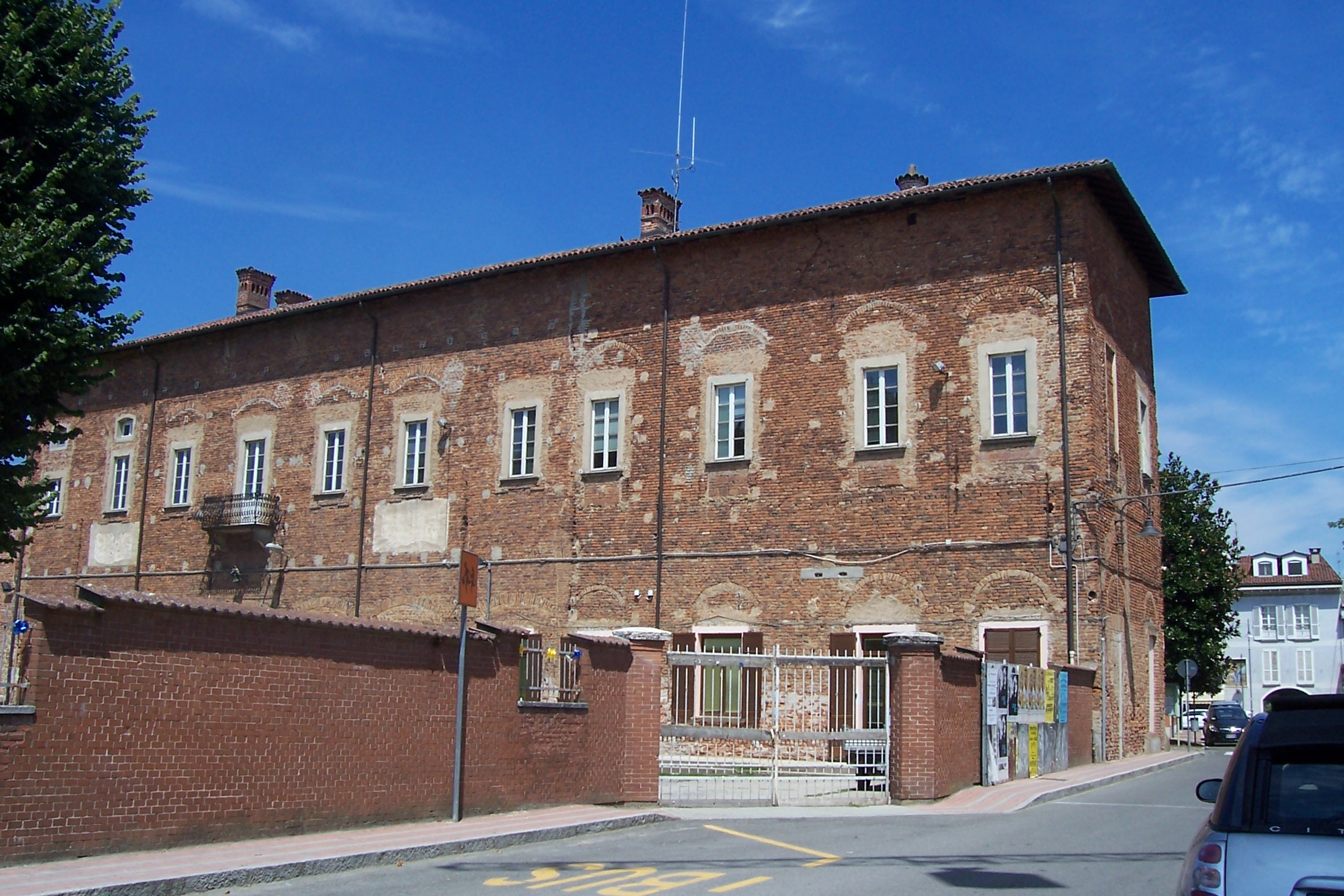
- Town hall of Corteolona e Genzone

- Location within Italy Location within Lombardy
- Coordinates: 45°9′N 9°22′E
- Country: Italy
- Region: Lombardy
- Province: Pavia (PV)
- Frazioni: Corteolona, Genzone

Government
  - Mayor: Angelo Della Valle

Area
  - Total: 14.09 km^{2} (5.44 sq mi)

Population (31 August 2017)
  - Total: 2,594
  - Density: 184.1/km^{2} (476.8/sq mi)
- Time zone: UTC+1 (CET)
  - Summer (DST): UTC+2 (CEST)
- Postal code: 27014
- Dialing code: 0382
- Website: Official website

Corteolona e Genzone is a comune (municipality) in the Province of Pavia in the Italian region Lombardy.

It was established on 1 January 2016 by the merger of the municipalities of Corteolona and Genzone.
