= Ercole d'Este, Lord of San Martino =

Ercole d'Este
- 2nd Lord of San Martino in Rio; 1st Count of Corteolona
- Reign: 1507–1523
- Predecessor: Sigismondo I d'Este
- Successor: Sigismondo II d'Este
- Born: c. 1470
- Died: 20 October 1523 (aged 52–53); Castellarano, Duchy of Reggio
- Noble family: Este di San Martino
- Spouse: Angela Sforza (m. 1491)
- Issue Detail: Sigismondo II d'Este; Lucrezia d'Este
- Father: Sigismondo I d'Este
- Mother: Cecilia Rachesi da Rezo
- Occupation: Military commander

Governor of Modena
- In office 1510–1511

Ercole d'Este (c. 1470 – Castellarano, 20 October 1523) was an Italian nobleman who was Lord of San Martino in Rio.

He was the son of Sigismondo I d'Este.

== Biography ==
Ercole was born sometime around 1470; the illegitimate son of Sigismondo d'Este, and his mistress Cecilia di Rachesi da Rezo, he was legitimized in August 1493.

In February 1490, together with his father Sigismondo, his uncle, the Duke of Ferrara Ercole I d'Este and several members of the Este family, he was in Mantua for the wedding of his cousin Isabella d'Este with Francesco II Gonzaga. He is mentioned on his return journey in the Chronicles of Caleffini: "As the duke came from Mantua for a wedding - Tuesday (10) the 23rd of February, which was Carnival and the feast of St. Mathias the Apostle, the illustrious lord Duke of Ferrara and his sons, and the aforementioned Sir Rainaldo of Este, and Sir Hercule, son of the illustrious Sir Sigismondo of Este, that is, his son and of Cecilia di Rachesi da Rezo." (Note: Come el duca vene da noze da Mantua - Marti(10) a dì 23 de febraro, che fu Carnevale et vizilia de san Mathia apostolo, arrivo in Ferrara che veniva da Mantua, lo illustrissimo signore duca de Ferrara et figlioli, et messer Rainaldo da Este predicto, et messer Hercule figliolo de lo illustre messer Sigismondo da Este predicto, cioè suo fiolo et de la Cecilia di Rachesi da Rezo.)

On 25 January 1491 he married Angela Sforza, daughter of Carlo Sforza and Bianca Simonetta; his wife's father was the illegitimate son of the Duke of Milan Galeazzo Maria.

On 24 December 1493 Duke Gian Galeazzo Maria Sforza granted Ercole d'Este citizenship to Milan, Pavia and Lodi.

At the end of the 15th century, the Duke of Milan granted him the title of Count of Corteolona and Lord of the Vicariate of Belgioioso; these territories came from the inheritance of Angelo Simonetta, ancestor of Angela Sforza.

The Vicariate of Belgioioso already in 1450, at the time of the enfeoffment to Simonetta and with substantial and almost complete territorial continuity in the 16th century, included: Beatico, Canlepre, Cascina Melana, Corteolona, Costa dei Nobili, Filighera, Genzone, Miradolo Terme, Monte, Monteleone, Montesano, Monsico, Ospedaletto, Pieve Porto Morone, Pissarello, San Zenone al Po, Spessa, Spissia Soprana cum Rubarello, Torre de' Negri, Torre Selvatica, Vaccarizza, Zerbo, Zoiosa.

Ercole d'Este, holding military roles and having obtained the investiture of the vast Vicariate of Belgioioso with the territories of Corteolona, Filighera and Corte Sant'Andrea in the Bassa Pavese, will in fact move the point of reference of the Este branch of San Martino more towards the Duchy of Milan, compared to the native Duchy of Ferrara.

In 1507, upon his father's death, he succeeded him in the title of Lord of San Martino and the related jurisdictions; however, three years had to pass and only in 1510 did he abandon the Milanese state to return to his territories.

In 1510 he was appointed Governor of Modena; a position he held until 1511, the year in which he was forced to flee from Modena following the occupation of the city by the papal troops of Pope Julius II. Ercole retired to Castellarano.

He died on 20 October 1523 in Castellarano; he was succeeded by his firstborn and only son, Sigismondo.

== Issue ==
With his wife Angela Sforza, he had two children:

- Sigismondo II d'Este (c. 1493 – c. 1561), 1st Marquis of Borgomanero and Porlezza, 3rd Lord of San Martino in Rio, Campogalliano and Castellarano, 2nd Count of Corteolona and Lord of the Vicariate of Belgioioso ;
- Lucrezia (died after 1549), married in 1514 Manfredo II da Correggio, sovereign count of Correggio and count of the Holy Roman Empire.

== Sources ==
- Caleffini, Ugo (2006). Croniche: 1471-1494 (in Italian). Deputazione provinciale ferrarese di storiapatria.
- Chiappini, Luciano (2001). Gli Estensi: mille anni di storia (in Italian). Corbo. ISBN 978-88-8269-029-8.
- Cottafavi, Clinio (1885). S. Martino in Rio: ricerche storiche (dal 1050 al 1859) (in Italian). Atesa Editrice.
- Donati, Claudio (1997). "Una famiglia lombarda tra XVI e XVIII secolo: Gli Este di San Martino e i loro feudi". In Fregni, Euride (ed.). Archivi territori poteri in area estense (secc. XVI-XVIII) (in Italian). Rome: Bulzoni.
- Muratori, Lodovico Antonio (1984). Delle antichità estensi ed italiane (in Italian). A. Forni.
- Pederzoli, Fabio (2020). "San Martino in Rio. Il feudo dei "veri" estensi". San Martino in Rio. Il feudo dei "veri" estensi. Quaderni del Ducato, Le piccole capitali delle terre estensi (in Italian). Modena: Terra e Identità.
- Pederzoli, Fabio (2024). Este di San Martino al servizio di Sua Maestà Cattolica : una dinastia estense tra il Milanesado e il Ducato di Savoia. I Quaderni del Ducato. Modena: Terra e Identità. ISBN 978-88-94629-96-5.
- Severi, Mauro (1984). "La rocca cuore di San Martino". In Bellocchi, Ugo (ed.). San Martino in Rio. Vicende e protagonisti. Reggio Emilia: Comune di San Martino in Rio, Tecnostampa.
- Severi, Mauro (2017). "San Martino in Rio" (in Italian). Silvana Editoriale. ISBN 9788836637072.
- Severi, Mauro (2022). "San Martino in Rio e la sua rocca". Silvana Editoriale. ISBN 9788836648900.
- Trenti, Giuseppe; Spaggiari, Angelo (1985). Gli stemmi estensi ed austro-estensi: profilo storico. Modena: Aedes Muratoriana.
