= Enzo Boschetti =

Italian Roman Catholic priest

Venerable Enzo Boschetti
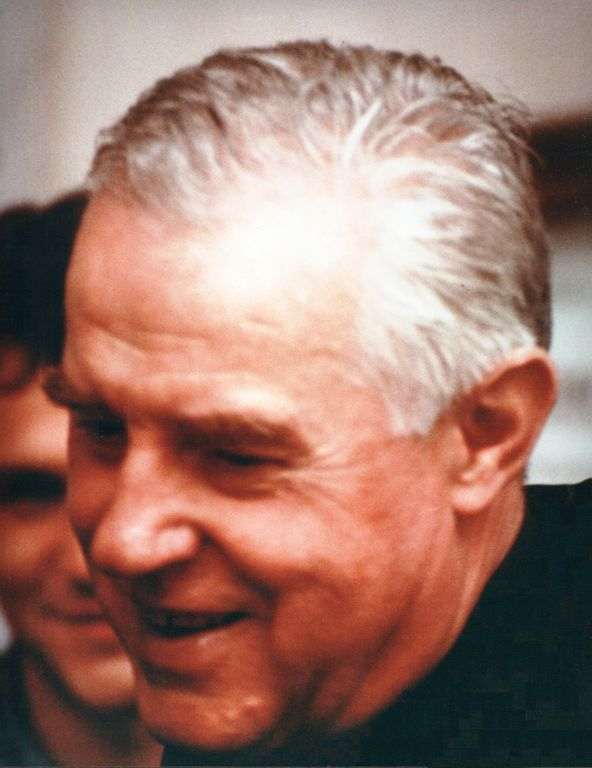
- Boschetti on 14 September 1991.
- Born: 19 November 1929; Costa de' Nobili, Pavia, Kingdom of Italy
- Died: 15 February 1993 (aged 63); Esine, Brescia, Italy
- Venerated in: Roman Catholic Church
- Attributes: Priest's cassock

Enzo Boschetti (19 November 1929 – 15 February 1993) – once known as Giuliano in the religious life – was an Italian Roman Catholic priest and the founder of the Casa del Giovane. He once served as a friar from the Carmelites and did work in the missions in Kuwait though decided to return to his homeland to serve as a diocesan priest instead. He did his studies in Rome before his sacerdotal ordination in 1962; he began working in parishes where he became sensitive to the needs of workers and those suffering from gambling and drug addictions. He founded an institute for those people suffering from addictions and set up a range of courses and workshops to help addicts lead better and healthier lives.

Boschetti's process for beatification opened in 2005 and he became titled as a Servant of God. The cause culminated on 11 June 2019 after Pope Francis signed a decree that acknowledged the fact that Boschetti had led a life of heroic virtue.

== Life ==
Enzo Boschetti was born in Costa de' Nobili in the Pavia province on 19 November 1929 as the second of three children to the truck driver Silvio Boschetti and Esterina. In his adolescence he joined the Catholic Action in Pavia while attending some spiritual retreats gave rise to his call to enter into the religious life.

He fled home after he turned 20 in late 1949 in order to join the Carmelites and then served as Fra Giuliano in his convent with his fellow friars (he decided to join the Carmelites at their convent in Monza after having read about Thérèse of Lisieux). He was later assigned to work in the missions in Kuwait in spring 1956 but there struggled with his call to the diocesan priesthood as opposed to the religious life. He decided instead to serve on the so-called frontlines of parish life rather than continuing to work in the missions. The challenge became that a religious could not opt for the diocesan priesthood which prompted Boschetti to leave the order in a move that surprised and baffled his superiors and peers. He received his sacerdotal ordination to the priesthood from the Bishop of Pavia Carlo Allorio on 29 June 1962 in the diocesan cathedral after having completed his theological formation in Rome. He was first assigned to serve as a pastor in Chignolo Po but in 1965 was reassigned to the Santissimo Salvatore parish. This church was located in the Ticinello neighbourhood which exposed Boschetti to the problems facing people such as drug and gambling addictions which he wished to help people recover from. His main focus was to prevent teenagers from falling into those said addictions.

He founded the Casa del Giovane for those that suffered from gambling or drug addictions and he became a strong advocate for those suffering from addiction; he had also made the commitment to tend to adolescents who were beginning to exhibit gambling or drug-taking traits as he advocated for them to lead healthier lives free of addiction which would cause harm to themselves and those around them. He was noted for having walked around poor neighbourhoods in trousers and a blue or black sweater as opposed to his clerical cassock. This movement he founded had its origins in 1968 but began to gain traction in 1971 when he managed to attract others. In the 1980s he helped to establish a series of workshops to promote growth in the workplace and also set out to establish courses in schools. He often touted Saint Joseph as a guide and as a model when it came to the pastoral care of workers.

In the 1980s he was hospitalized after suffering a nervous breakdown while in 1987 having an operation on his stomach. Boschetti died in a hospital in Esine from pancreatic cancer in 1993 after five consecutive months in which he had to undergo chemo treatment. The Bishop of Pavia Giovanni Volta celebrated the funeral Mass in the week of his death.

== Beatification process ==
The beatification process commenced after the forum for the cause was transferred from the Brescia diocese (where Boschetti died) to the Pavia diocese on 17 March 2005. The Congregation for the Causes of Saints launched the cause on 16 May 2005 after titling Boschetti as a Servant of God and issuing the official "nihil obstat" (no objections) edict. The diocesan process was overseen in Pavia from 15 February 2006 until 16 February 2008 while the C.C.S. later validated that process on 7 May 2010.

The C.C.S. received the official Positio dossier in 2014 for assessment while nine theologians voiced their assent to the cause sometime after. The C.C.S. cardinal and bishops agreed with their verdict and likewise issued their own approval at their meeting held on 4 June 2019. Boschetti became titled as Venerable on 11 June 2019 after Pope Francis confirmed that the late priest had practiced heroic virtue throughout his life to an adequate degree.

The current postulator for this cause is Francesca Consolini.

== See also ==
- Streetwise priest
