= Zerbo, Lombardy =

Zerbo
- Comune
- Comune di Zerbo
- Location within Italy Location within Lombardy
- Coordinates: 45°7′N 9°24′E
- Country: Italy
- Region: Lombardy
- Province: Province of Pavia (PV)

Area
  - Total: 6.4 km^{2} (2.5 sq mi)

Population (Dec. 2004)
  - Total: 465
  - Density: 73/km^{2} (190/sq mi)
- Time zone: UTC+1 (CET)
  - Summer (DST): UTC+2 (CEST)
- Postal code: 27010
- Dialing code: 0382

Zerbo is a comune (municipality) in the Province of Pavia in the Italian region Lombardy, located about 45 km (28 mi) southeast of Milan and about 20 km (12 mi) southeast of Pavia. As of 31 December 2004, it had a population of 465 and an area of 6.4 km^{2} (2.5 sq mi).

Zerbo borders the following municipalities: Arena Po, Costa de' Nobili, Pieve Porto Morone, San Zenone al Po.

== Demographic evolution ==
Historical population

Year	Pop.	±%
1861	926	—
1871	973	+5.1%
1881	996	+2.4%
1901	898	−9.8%
1911	902	+0.4%

Year	Pop.	±%
1921	876	−2.9%
1931	811	−7.4%
1936	771	−4.9%
1951	720	−6.6%
1961	644	−10.6%

Year	Pop.	±%
1971	579	−10.1%
1981	498	−14.0%
1991	484	−2.8%
2001	466	−3.7%

Source: Data from ISTAT
