= Quirici =

Quirici is a surname. Notable people with the surname include:

- Elena Quirici (born 1994), Swiss karateka
- Giovanni Quirici (1824–1896), Italian composer
