= Sigismondo d'Este (1433–1507) =

Ferrarese nobleman (1433–1507)

- Prince of Ferrara, Modena and Reggio; Lord of Campogalliano, Castellarano, San Cassiano and Rodeglia
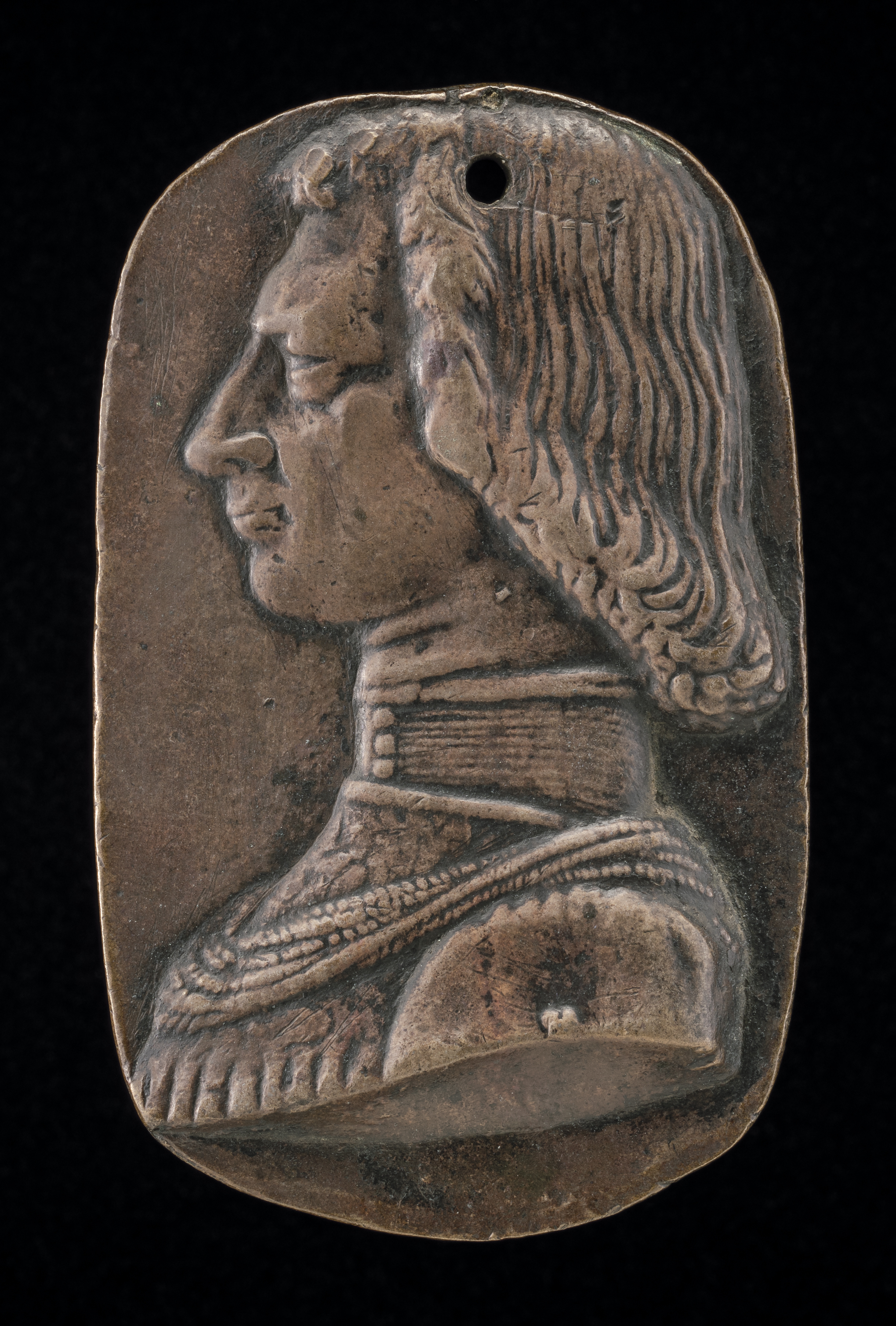

Lord of San Martino in Rio
- Reign: 1490 – 1 April 1507
- Predecessor: Title created
- Successor: Ercole d'Este
- Born: 31 August 1433; Ferrara
- Died: 1 April 1507 (aged 73); Ferrara
- Burial: Church of Santa Maria degli Angeli, later moved to the Monastery of Corpus Domini
- Issue: Rizzarda; Lucrezia; Bianca; Diana; Ercole; Gurone; Laura; Girolama; Taddea
- House: House of Este
- Father: Niccolò III d'Este
- Mother: Ricciarda di Saluzzo
- Religion: Catholicism

Sigismondo d'Este (31 August 1433 - 1 April 1507) was a Ferrarese nobleman. He was lord of San Martino in Rio, Campogalliano, Rodeglia, Castellarano and San Cassiano, governor of Reggio, governor and duke's lieutenant of the duchy of Ferrara and captain-general of the duke of Ferrara's army.

== Life ==
Sigismondo was born in Ferrara, the second son of Niccolò III d'Este and his third wife Ricciarda di Saluzzo. In 1434 he was christened and armed as a knight of his godfather Sigismund, Holy Roman Emperor. He, his mother and his elder brother fled to the court of Alfonso V of Aragon. In 1463 he was made governor of Reggio Emilia by Borso d'Este. In December 1470 he fought against count Guido Pepoli, plundering Pepoli's lands in retaliation for Pepoli's plundering of Sigismondo's lands. Borso was succeeded by Sigismundo's elder brother, who kept on Sigismondo as lieutenant of Reggio Emilia and had him rule the duchy when he was absent. Between 1467 and 1488 he fought in several wars on his brother's behalf and from 1488 onwards he became the only man to rule in his absence.

As a reward, Ercole gave his brother the lordships of San Martino in Rio, Campogalliano, Rodeglia, Castellarano and San Cassiano. In 1507 Sigismondo fell on the steps of St Peter's Basilica in Rome and died. His successors in the Este-San Martino line ruled Castellarano on and off until 1758.

== Issue ==
Sigismondo had three daughters with his wife Pizzocara:

- Lucrezia d'Este, married Antonio Alberico II Malaspina, marquess of Massa and lord of Carrara; had four daughters, among whom Ricciarda Malaspina;
- Bianca d'Este, married Amerigo Sanseverino, count of Capaccio;
- Diana d'Este (? - 1555), married Uguccione Contrari, count of Vignola.

He also had a natural son (later legitimized) with Cecilia di Rachesi da Rezo:

- Ercole d'Este (ca 1470 - 1517), lord of San Martino. Married Angiola Sforza, with whom he had one son, Sigismondo II, his heir;

== Sources ==
- Bartlett, Kenneth R. (2013). A Short History of the Italian Renaissance. University of Toronto Press. ISBN 978-1-4426-0014-0.
- Caleffini, Ugo (2006). Cazzola, Franco (ed.). Croniche 1471–1494. Deputazione Provinciale Ferrarese di Storia Patria.
