= Arena Po =

Arena Po Reina (Lombard)
- Comune
- Comune di Arena Po
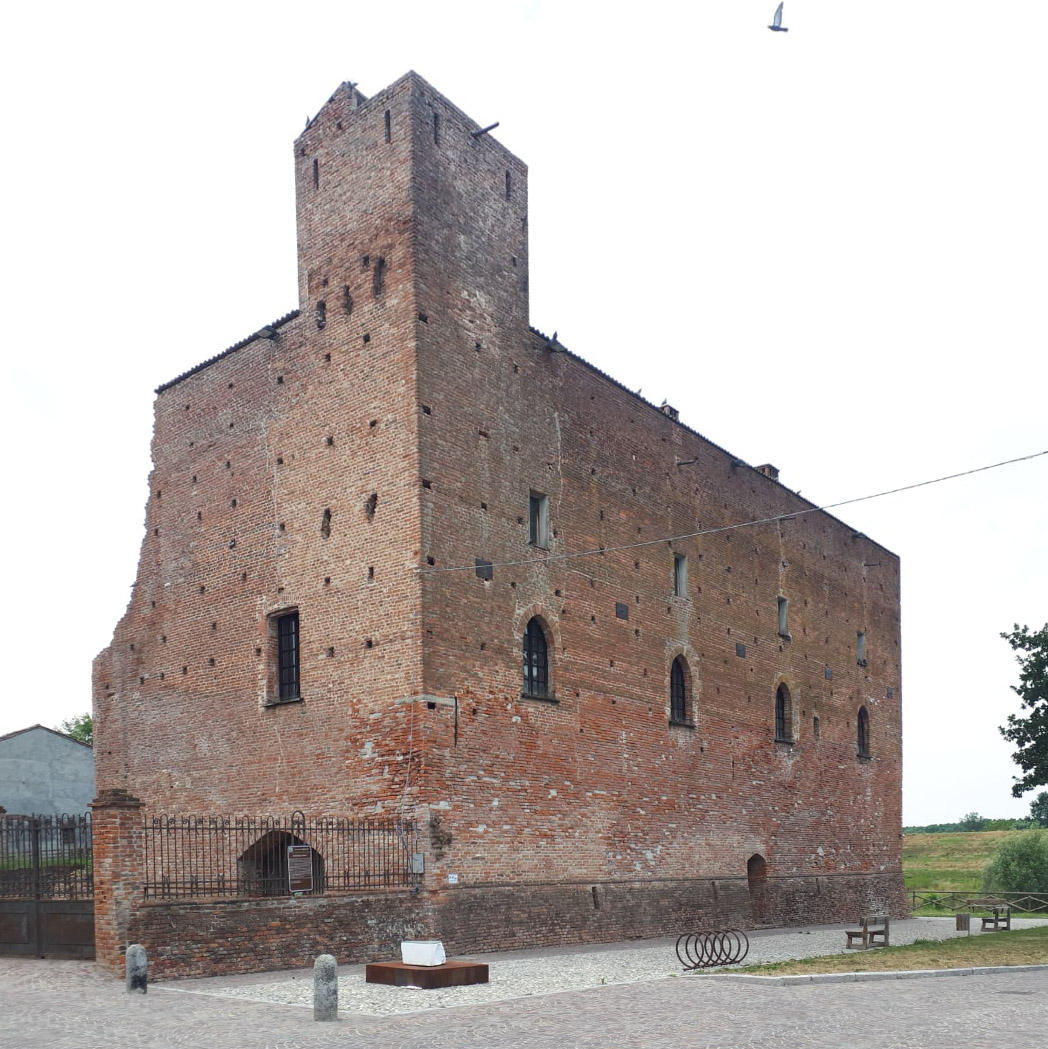
- View of Arena Po

- Location within Italy Location within Lombardy
- Coordinates: 45°4′N 9°21′E
- Country: Italy
- Region: Lombardy
- Province: Province of Pavia (PV)

Area
  - Total: 22.3 km^{2} (8.6 sq mi)
- Elevation: 61 m (200 ft)

Population (Dec. 2004)
  - Total: 1,595
  - Density: 71.5/km^{2} (185/sq mi)
- Demonym: Arenesi
- Time zone: UTC+1 (CET)
  - Summer (DST): UTC+2 (CEST)
- Postal code: 27040
- Dialing code: 0385

Arena Po (Lombard: Reina) is a comune (municipality) in the Province of Pavia in the Italian region of Lombardy, located about 45 km (28 mi) southeast of Milan and about 20 km (12 mi) southeast of Pavia. As of 31 December 2004, it had a population of 1,595 and an area of 22.3 km^{2} (8.6 sq mi).

Arena Po borders the following municipalities: Bosnasco, Castel San Giovanni, Pieve Porto Morone, Portalbera, San Zenone al Po, Spessa, Stradella, Zenevredo, and Zerbo. Composer Giovanni Quirici was born in the comune.

== Demographic evolution ==
Historical population

Year	Pop.	±%
1861	3,624	—
1871	3,751	+3.5%
1881	3,587	−4.4%
1901	3,646	+1.6%
1911	3,486	−4.4%

Year	Pop.	±%
1921	3,221	−7.6%
1931	3,055	−5.2%
1936	2,919	−4.5%
1951	2,606	−10.7%
1961	2,230	−14.4%

Year	Pop.	±%
1971	1,922	−13.8%
1981	1,612	−16.1%
1991	1,539	−4.5%
2001	1,572	+2.1%

Source: Data from ISTAT
