= Carlo Emmanuel d'Este =

- 4th Marquis of Borgomanero
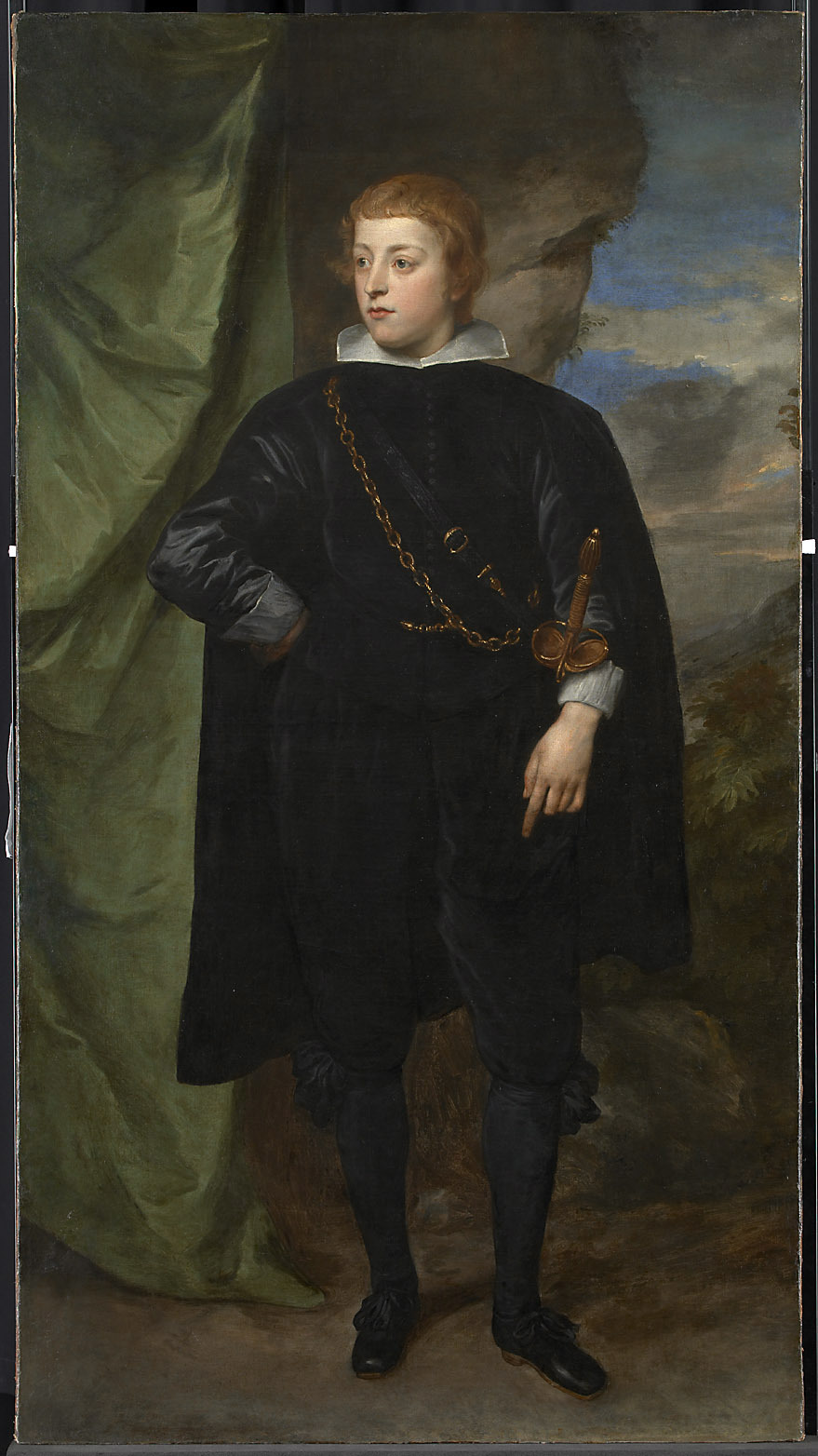
- Portrait of Carlo Emanuele d'Este by Anthony van Dyck (1634/35)
- Born: 1622; Turin, Duchy of Savoy
- Died: October 24, 1695; Vienna
- Noble family: Este
- Spouse: Paola Camilla Marliani
- Issue: Carlo Filiberto d'Este
- Father: Sigismondo d'Este
- Mother: Francesca Charledes d’Antel d’Hostel
- Occupation: Spanish Ambassador

Carlo Emmanuel d'Este (Turin, 1622 – Vienna, 24 October 1695) was an Italian noble, who served as Spanish Ambassador in England and the Holy Roman Empire.

== Biography ==
His father was Sigismund d’Este (1572–1628), a cavalry general and governor of Savoy and Saluzzo. His grandparents were Filippo d’Este, from Ferrara, and Maria of Savoy, the legitimized natural daughter of Emmanuel Philibert, Duke of Savoy.

Orphaned at a young age, Charles Emmanuel and his older brother Filippo Francesco were adopted by their uncle, Carlo Filiberto I d'Este, Marquis of San Martino (1571–1652). Their uncle had moved from Savoy to Spain, where he served King Philip III and later Cardinal-Infante Ferdinand of Austria. He accompanied the Cardinal to Brussels, taking his two orphaned nephews with him, whom he recommended to the Cardinal as pages. There, they appear to have been portrayed by Anthony van Dyck in separate paintings, now in the Vienna Museum, according to modern research.

As a young man, Carlo Emmanuel d'Este served in the Spanish army, attaining the rank of Sergeant Major General in Flanders and later Captain General in Milan. He was made a Knight of the Golden Fleece in 1657. He also served as a State Councilor. From his childless uncle, he received the title of 4th Marquis of Borgomanero, while his brother, as the eldest son, received the title of Marquis of San Martino.

From the military, he then definitively entered the field of diplomacy, being appointed envoy to England in 1676 and again in 1677–1678. In 1679, he was elevated to the rank of Ambassador in London.

Relieved of his London post, Borgomanero was appointed ambassador to Vienna in 1681, a position of great importance as it was the capital of the other branch of the Habsburg dynasty, ruled by Emperor Leopold, uncle of Charles II of Spain. In Vienna, Borgomanero proved to be one of the most active and brilliant ambassadors of those decades of Charles II's reign, maintaining good relations with the Viennese court and countering the hostile plans of the French.

When the Turks besieged Vienna in 1683, the Imperial Court left Vienna, traveling up the Danube to Linz, and Ambassador Borgomanero accompanied them. He introduced the young Prince Eugene of Savoy to the Emperor, who would become one the greatest military commanders of the Habsburg Empire. After the liberation of Vienna, Borgomanero found his palace, the old and prestigious Spanish residence, almost in ruins due to the ravages of the siege, given its proximity to the city walls. Facing serious financial and personal difficulties, and spending his own fortune, Borgomanero dedicated himself to the building's restoration.

Borgomanero remained in Vienna for over a decade, working to foster dynastic unity, reinforced by political interests and family ties between Madrid and Vienna, at a time when plans were already being made for the difficult Spanish succession. He died in vienna in October 1695.
