= Tidone =

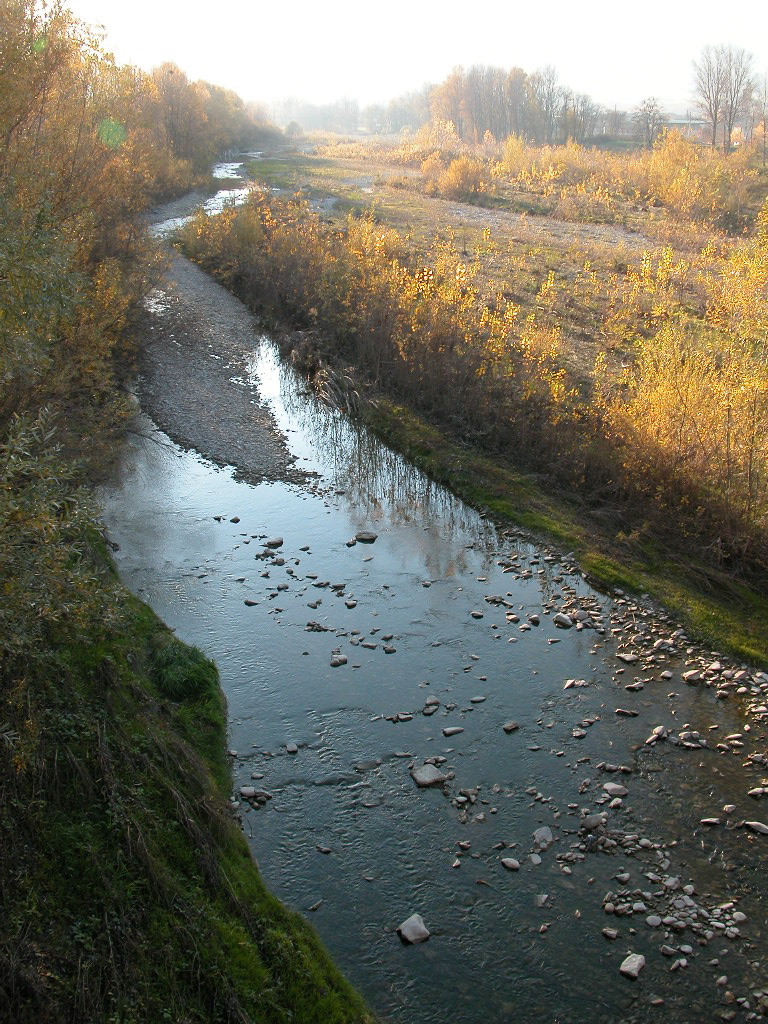

Location
- Country: Italy

Physical characteristics
- Source
  - location: near Monte Penice, Ligurian Apennines
  - coordinates: 44.805°N 9.321°E
  - elevation: 1,000 m (3,300 ft)
- Mouth
  - location: Po River near Sarmato and Rottofreno
  - coordinates: 45.0789°N 9.5312°E
- Length: 47 km (29 mi)
- Discharge
  - average: 8 m^{3}/s (280 cu ft/s)

Basin features
- Progression: Po→ Adriatic Sea

The Tidone is a river in the Region of Emilia Romagna in northern Italy. It is a right-bank tributary of the Po River. The stream rises in the Apennine Mountains near Monte Penice and flows in a northerly direction into the Po.

== Geography ==
The Tidone's sources are on the northern slope of Monte Penice at an altitude of over 1,000 metres (3,281 ft) in the Apennine Mountains in the municipality of Menconico. The river flows down a narrow mountain valley called Val Tidone. The upper reaches of the stream are located in the Province of Pavia while the middle and lower course is in the Province of Piacenza. The village of Romagnese is found in the upper part of the valley.

Near the town of Nibbiano the Tidone flows into the Lago di Trebecco which is formed by a dam built in the 1920s. The reservoir is used for irrigation and the dam produces a modest amount of electricity.

The Tidone leaves the foothills near Pianello Val Tidone and enters the flat Po plains. The stream flows into the Po west of Piacenza between the towns of Sarmato on the west and Rottofreno on the east. The affluents of the Tidone are mountain streams called the Morcione, Tidoncello, Chiarone and Luretta. The Trebbia River is the next major river to the east.

== History ==
The Battle of Trebbia was fought near the lower course of the Tidone when Hannibal defeated a Roman army in 218 BC. The name dates from the battle when a Roman centurion found the Tidone's waters to be clear and drinkable while the nearby Trebbia supposedly ran red with the blood of the battle's victims. In thanks to the river, the officer said O Valle ti dono questo anello; ti dono (I give). Also fought in the area was a second Battle of Trebbia in 1799 which pitted a Republican French army against Alexander Suvorov's allied armies of the Russian Empire and Habsburg Austria.

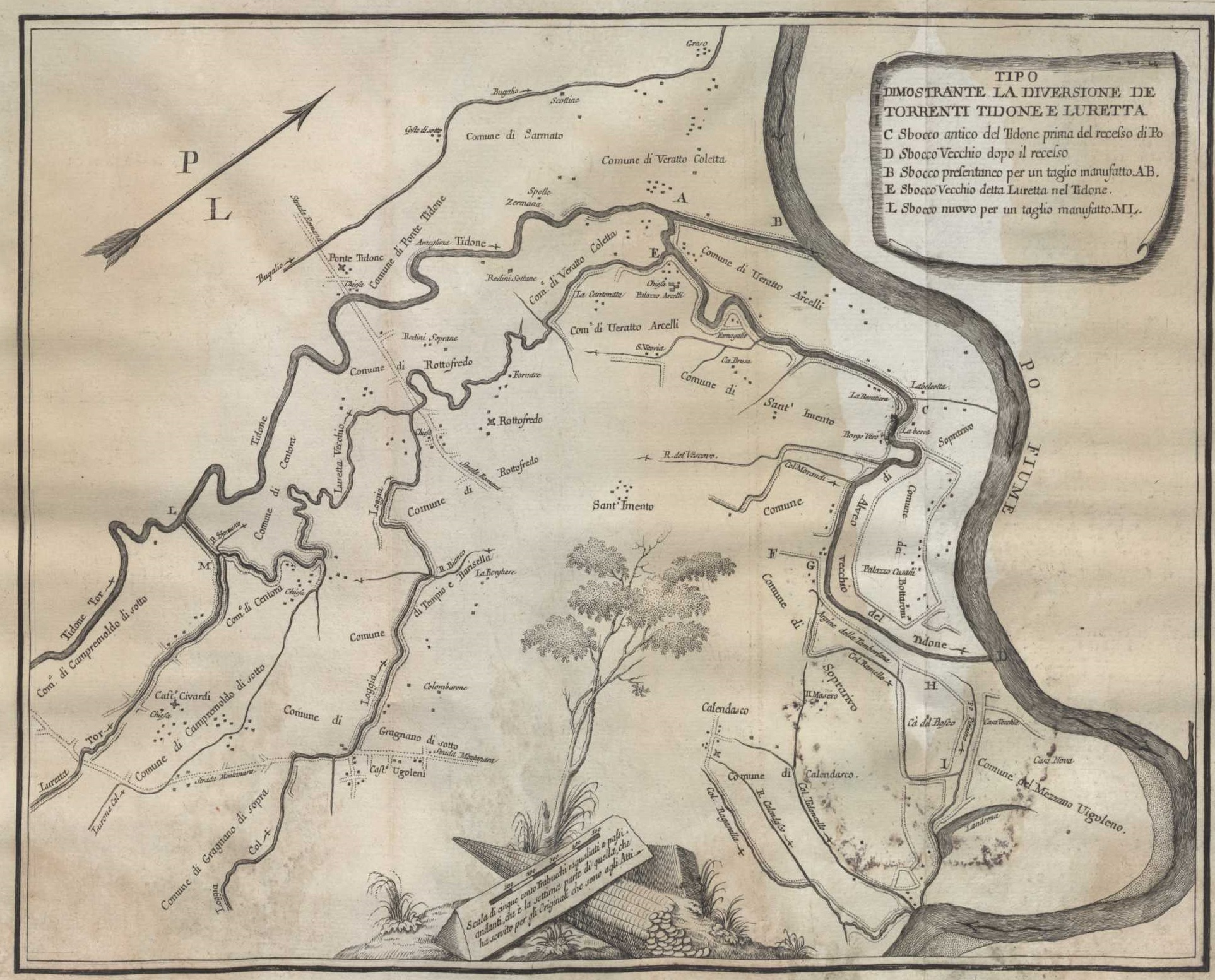
Tidone river map in the 18th century

== See also ==
- Luretta Valley
