= Carlo Dossi =

Italian writer, politician and diplomat (1849–1910)

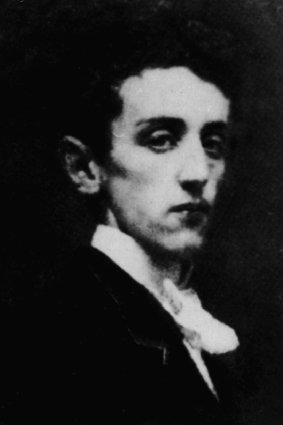
- Born: Carlo Alberto Pisani Dossi; March 27, 1849; Zenevredo
- Died: November 10, 1910 (aged 61); Cardina
- Occupations: novelist, essayist
- Spouse: Carlotta Borsani (m. 1891)
- Children: Bianca; Franco Alvise; Elena
- Writing career
- Language: Italian
- Notable works: L'altrieri. Vita di Alberto Pisanti; La desinenza in A Note azzurre
- Movement: Scapigliatura

Carlo Alberto Pisani Dossi (born March 27, 1849, in Zenevredo; died November 19, 1910, Cardina, Como) was an Italian writer, politician and diplomat. He belonged to the Scapigliati. Dossi was a member of the first generation of Lombard line.

== Biography ==
Born into an aristocratic Lombard family and educated in Milan and Pavia, Carlo Alberto Pisani Dossi began his literary career at 16, when he and his friend Gigi Perelli co-authored two stories published together as Giannetto pregò un dì la mamma che il lasciasse andare alla scuola. In 1867 they founded the ambitious journal Palestra letteraria artistica e scientifica, whose contributors were to include Rovani, Carducci, Francesco Guerrazzi, and Settembrini. Perelli brought Dossi into contact with the Milanese Scapigliatura, and in particular with Giuseppe Rovani. Dossi admired him as the equal of Manzoni and wrote an unfinished study published posthumously as Rovaniana. But thanks to his wealth, and his character, he was able to maintain a personal and aesthetic distance from the movement. He then moved to Rome in 1872 where he made friends with, among others, Edmondo Mayor des Planches and Luigi Bodio. In 1873 he became plenipotentiary in Eritrea (an Italian colony to which he seems to have given the name replacing the previous one of "New Ethiopia"). He married Carlotta Borsani in 1892 and became consul general first in Bogotà and three years later in Athens. Both postings allowed him to pursue a passion for archaeology. He retired upon Crispi's death in 1901. Dossi was an atheist.

== Works ==
In 1868 Dossi published the first of two autobiographical narratives, L'Altrieri: nero su bianco, in which, in a highly creative linguistic pastiche with its main roots in Lombard dialect, he evokes the golden age of childhood. It was followed by Vita di Alberto Pisani scritta da Alberto Pisani (1870), which opens with the defeat of the Piedmontese at Novara (1849) and his own birth in nearby Zenevredo (Pavia). Like its predecessor it plays memory and storytelling against each other, but now episodes from the past are distinguished linguistically and set apart typographically from the main text; they would later be included as self-standing stories in Goccie d'inchiostro (1880). Both volumes were privately published in limited editions of 100 copies each. 1872 saw the publication of the elegy Elvira, likewise in a special edition, which included a drawing by the artist Tranquillo Cremona and musical notations by Edwart. Dossi's passion for satirical sketches led to Ritratti umani, dal calamajo di un medico (1873), Ritratti umani. Campionario (1885), and then to the extended, deeply misogynistic polemic of La desinenza in A (1878), though alongside caricature and satire came the Rousseauistic utopian vision of the novel La colonia felice (1874). After his death his wife published Note azzurre (1912), a selection from the engaging, idiosyncratic notebooks that Dossi continued to write long after he had stopped publishing. A fuller edition appeared in 1964.

== Quotes ==
- Before I've read them, I never write my name into the books I buy, because only after that I can call them mine.
- In many endeavors to gain glory, not the goal is important, but the struggle.
- Madmen open the paths which are later traversed by the wise.
- Why do people avoid being alone? Because only few are in good company when left with themselves.
- Some open roads today so that others may pass tomorrow.
- Where the eyes willingly fall, so does the heart, and eventually the feet.

== Works ==
- L'altrieri. Nero su bianco (1868)
- Vita di Alberto Pisani (1870)
- Elvira, elegia (1872)
- Il regno dei cieli (1873)
- Ona famiglia de cialapponi (1873)
- Ritratti umani, dal calamajo di un mèdico (1873)
- La colonia felice (1874)
- La desinenza in A (1878)
- Gocce d'inchiostro (1880)
- Ritratti umani. Campionario (1885)
- Amori (1887)
- Fricassea critica d'arte, letteratura e storia (1906)
- Rovaniana (1944)
- Note azzurre (1912-1964)

== Bibliography ==
- Isella, Dante (1958). La lingua e lo stile di Carlo Dossi. Florence: Ricciardi Editore.
- Lioce, Francesco (2015). "PISANI DOSSI, Alberto Carlo". Dizionario Biografico degli Italiani (in Italian). Vol. 84: Piovene–Ponzo. Rome: Institute of the Italian Encyclopaedia. ISBN 978-88-12-00032-6.
