= Zenevredo =

- Comune
- Comune di Zenevredo
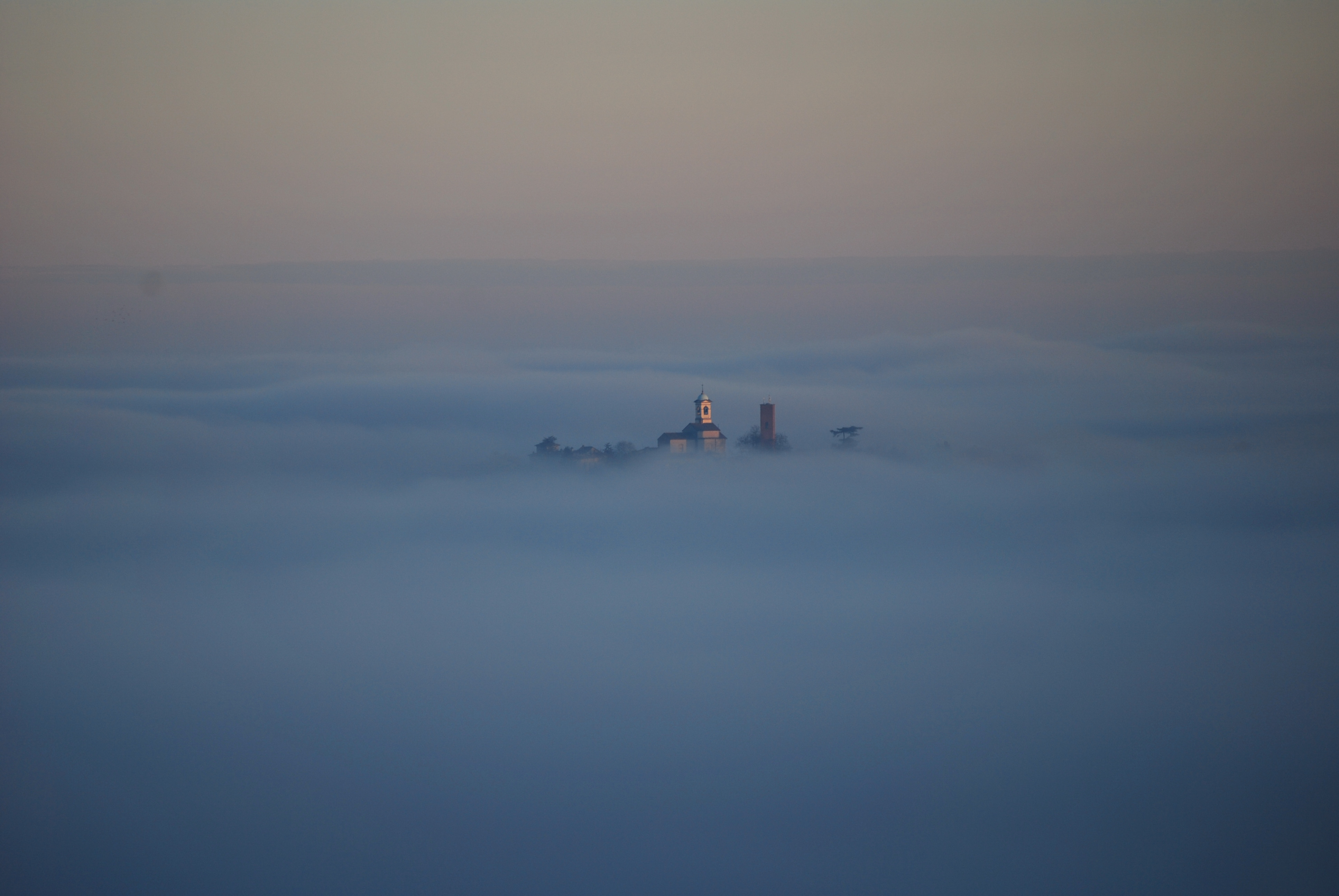

- Location within Italy Location within Lombardy
- Coordinates: 45°3′N 9°20′E
- Country: Italy
- Region: Lombardy
- Province: Pavia (PV)
- Frazioni: Campagnasso, Casa Gramegna, Cascina Vecchia, Fontanelle, Orzola, Poalone, Poggio Pelato

Government
  - Mayor: Antonio Pizzi (elected 2001-05-14)

Area
  - Total: 5.3 km^{2} (2.0 sq mi)
- Elevation: 204 m (669 ft)

Population (Dec. 2004)
  - Total: 459
  - Density: 87/km^{2} (220/sq mi)
- Demonym: Zenevredesi
- Time zone: UTC+1 (CET)
  - Summer (DST): UTC+2 (CEST)
- Postal code: 27049 (the Stradella post office)
- Dialing code: 0385

Zenevredo is a comune (municipality) in the Province of Pavia in the Italian region Lombardy, located about 50 km (31 mi) southeast of Milan and about 20 km (12 mi) southeast of Pavia. As of 31 December 2004, it had a population of 459 and an area of 5.3 km^{2} (2.0 sq mi).

Zenevredo borders the following municipalities: Arena Po, Bosnasco, Montù Beccaria, Stradella.

== Notable Zenevredesi ==
People born or based in Zenevredo include:

- Carlo Dossi (1849–1910), writer and archaeologist.

== Demographic evolution ==
Historical population

Year	Pop.	±%
1861	385	—
1871	418	+8.6%
1881	457	+9.3%
1901	690	+51.0%
1911	725	+5.1%

Year	Pop.	±%
1921	650	−10.3%
1931	611	−6.0%
1936	619	+1.3%
1951	623	+0.6%
1961	553	−11.2%

Year	Pop.	±%
1971	480	−13.2%
1981	389	−19.0%
1991	378	−2.8%
2001	453	+19.8%

Source: Data from ISTAT
