= Badia Pavese =

Badia Pavese Casél (Lombard)
- Comune
- Comune di Badia Pavese
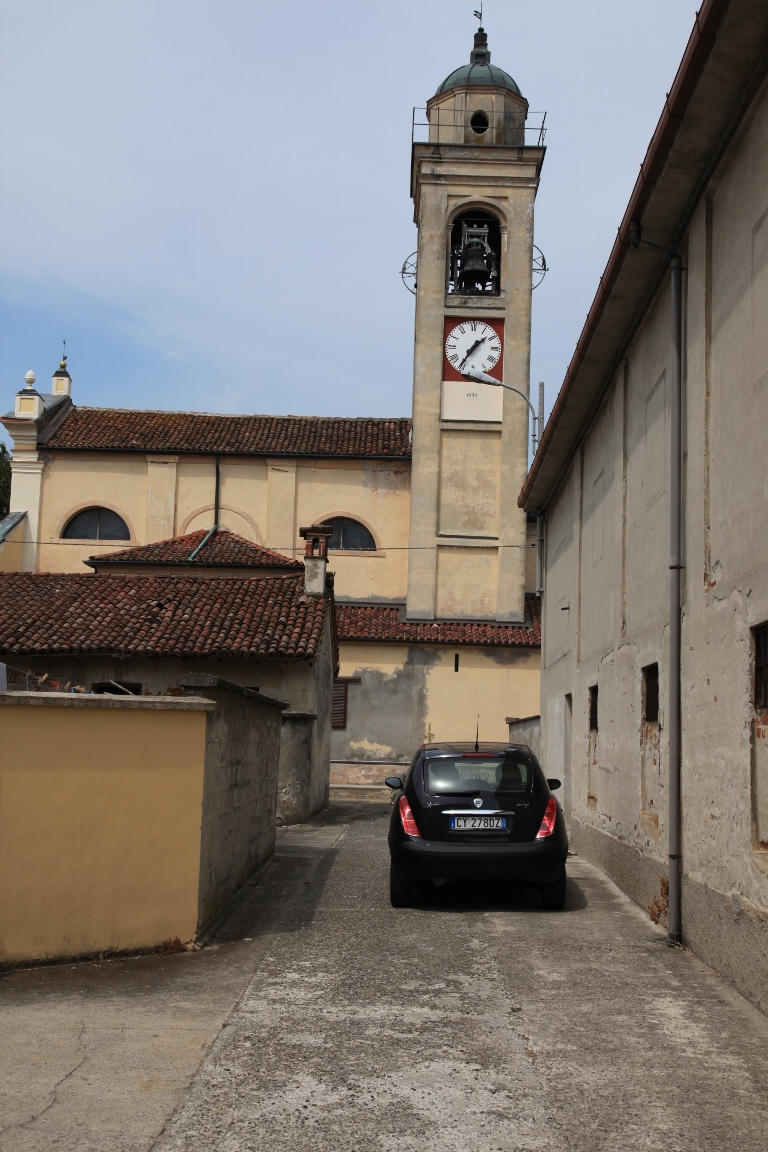
- View of Badia Pavese

- Location within Italy Location within Lombardy
- Coordinates: 45°7′N 9°28′E
- Country: Italy
- Region: Lombardy
- Province: Province of Pavia (PV)

Area
  - Total: 5.0 km^{2} (1.9 sq mi)

Population (Dec. 2004)
  - Total: 435
  - Density: 87/km^{2} (230/sq mi)
- Time zone: UTC+1 (CET)
  - Summer (DST): UTC+2 (CEST)
- Postal code: 27017
- Dialing code: 0382

Badia Pavese (Lombard: Casél) is a comune (municipality) in the Province of Pavia in the Italian region of Lombardy, located about 45 km (28 mi) southeast of Milan and about 25 km (16 mi) southeast of Pavia. As of 31 December 2004, it had a population of 435 and an area of 5.0 km^{2} (1.9 sq mi).

Badia Pavese borders the following municipalities: Chignolo Po, Monticelli Pavese, Pieve Porto Morone, Santa Cristina e Bissone.

== Demographic evolution ==
Historical population

Year	Pop.	±%
1861	601	—
1871	633	+5.3%
1881	603	−4.7%
1901	711	+17.9%
1911	765	+7.6%

Year	Pop.	±%
1921	675	−11.8%
1931	652	−3.4%
1936	643	−1.4%
1951	656	+2.0%
1961	543	−17.2%

Year	Pop.	±%
1971	469	−13.6%
1981	461	−1.7%
1991	390	−15.4%
2001	394	+1.0%

Source: Data from ISTAT
