= Maria of Savoy, Lady of San Martino =

Maria of Savoy

Lady of San Martino
- Tenure: 20 January 1570 – 28 October 1580
- Born: c. 1556; Vercelli, Principality of Piedmont, Duchy of Savoy
- Died: 28 October 1580 (aged 23–24); Turin
- Spouse: Filippo I d'Este (m. 1570)
- Issue: Carlo Filiberto; Margherita; Sigismondo; Alfonso; Beatrice Matilde
- Father: Emmanuel Philibert, Duke of Savoy
- Mother: Laura Crevola

Maria of Savoy (c. 1556 – 28 October 1580) was the illegitimate daughter of Emmanuel Philibert, Duke of Savoy, and his mistress Laura Crevola.

She would marry Filippo I d'Este, becoming the Lady Consort of San Martino.

== Biography ==
Maria was born sometime around 1556 in Vercelli to Emmanuel Philibert, Duke of Savoy, and his mistress Laura Crevola.

On 20 January 1570 she married Filippo I d'Este, already lord of San Martino and marquis of Borgomanero and Porlezza, bringing him as a dowry the territory of Crevacuore, which was later exchanged for the marquisate of Lanzo "with the other lands of the Valle et Castellata [...]".

The firstborn Carlo Filiberto was destined to be his father's heir, to the Lordship of San Martino and the annexed jurisdictions, together with the Marquisate of Borgomanero and Porlezza and the other titles in the Pavia area, while the thirdborn Sigismondo was to inherit the Marquisate of Lanzo from Maria, remaining at the Savoy court.

Maria died on 28 October 1580 in Turin. In the 19th century, at the request of Charles Albert, King of Sardinia, her remains were transferred to the Sacra di San Michele.

== Issue ==
With her husband Filippo, she had 5 children:

- Beatrice Matilde (1570–1609 or 1611), married on 8 June 1602 Ferrante di Ippolito I Bentivoglio, Marquis of Gualtieri and Magliano (?–1619).
- Carlo Filiberto I (1571–1652), 2nd Marquis of San Martino in Rio, 3rd Marquis of Borgomanero and Porlezza, 1st Marquis of Santa Cristina and 4th Count of Corteolona;
- Sigismondo (1572–1628), 2nd Marquis of Lanzo
- Alfonso (1573–1623), Commander of St. John of the Canton of Modena of the Order of Jerusalem;
- Margherita (1574 - ?).
