= Carlo Filiberto d'Este, Marquis of Dronero =

Carlo Filiberto
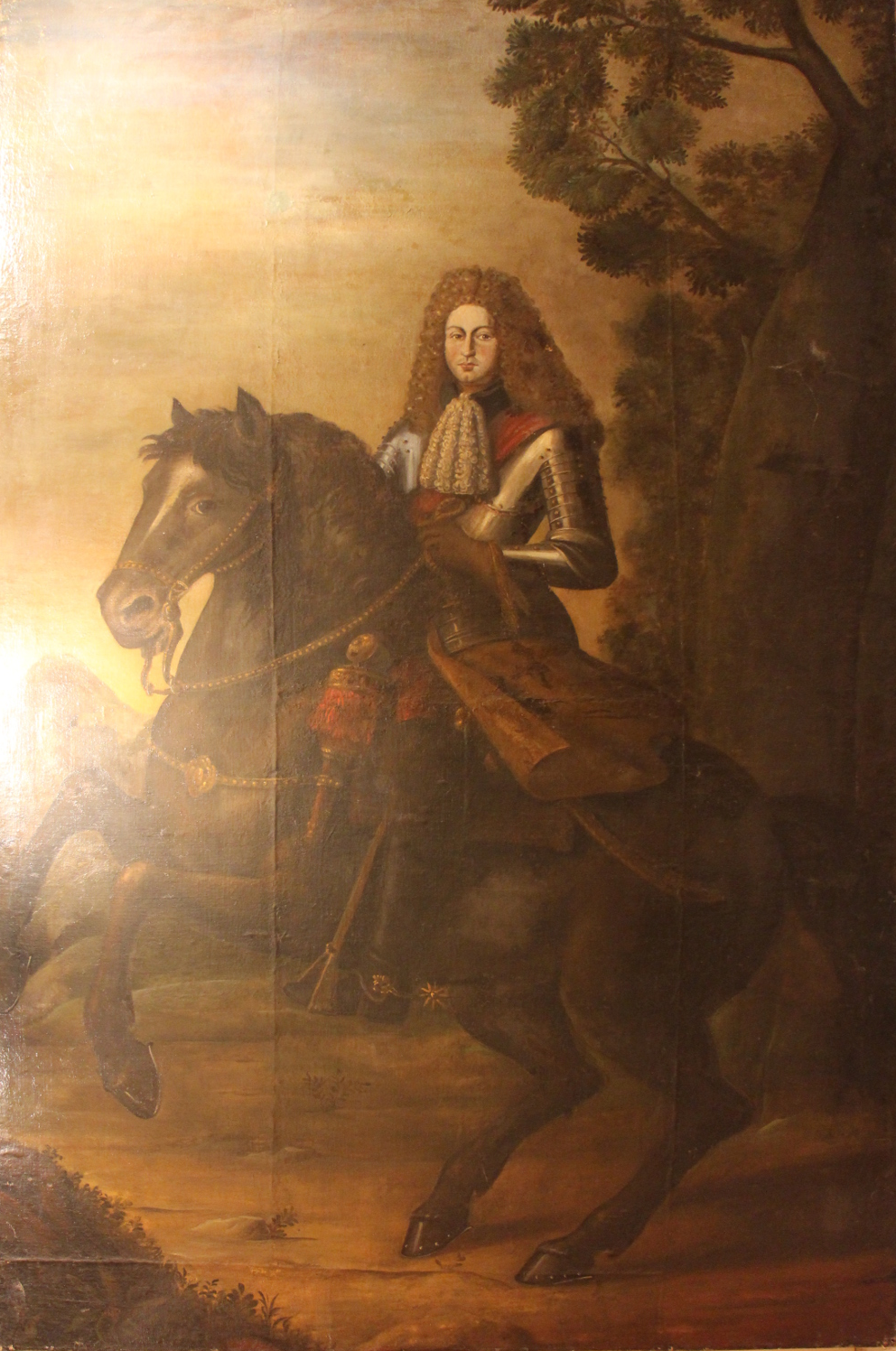

Marquess of Dronero
- Reign: 1653–1703
- Predecessor: Filippo II Francesco d'Este
- Successor: Gabriele d'Este
- Born: 1649
- Died: 1703 (aged 53–54)
- Spouse: Thérese de Mesmes de Marolles
- Issue: Cristina Margherita d'Este; Gabriele Francesco d'Este, 3rd Marquess of Dronero; Antonio Giuseppe d'Este; Maria Delfina d'Este; Filippo Pasquale d'Este; Cristina Francesca d'Este
- House: House of Este di San Martino
- Father: Filippo II Francesco d'Este
- Mother: Margherita of Savoy
- Religion: Roman Catholicism

Carlo Filiberto d'Este (1649 – 1703), son of Filippo II Francesco d'Este and Margherita of Savoy. He was Governor of Savoy and Turin and founder of the Este-Dronero line (1653 – 1734).

== Biography ==
Carlo Filiberto was born in 1649 as the second son of Filippo II Francesco d'Este, and Margherita of Savoy (illegitimate daughter of Charles Emmanuel I) inherited the Marquisate of Dronero from his father, becoming the founder of the short Este-Dronero line, which died out in 1734 with the death of his son Gabriele d'Este without male heirs. The Este family of Dronero's inheritance was at the centre of a long dispute between the Doria del Maro and the Birago di Vische, resolved in favour of the latter with the investiture of the Marquisate of Dronero on 13 June 1737.

Carlo Filiberto was captain of the armour of Madame Royale Marie Jeanne Baptiste of Savoy-Nemours.

In 1697 Carlo Filiberto, together with his son Gabriele, was sent as Governor to Savoy: "a country where it always rains; and as soon as the rain falls the cold makes itself felt with violence" and "there is no civil society, there is no walking".

== Marriage and issue ==
Carlo Filiberto married Thérese de Mesmes de Marolles, with whom he had 6 children with:

- Cristina Margherita (1668 - 1721), married Giambattista Nicomede Doria, Marquis of Cirié and del Maro;
- Gabriele Francesco (1673 - 1734), 3rd Marquis of Dronero. He secretly married Clara Colomba Cobianchi;
- Antonio Giuseppe (1676-?), Prince of Modena and Reggio;
- Maria Delfina (1677-?), Nun of the Congregation of the Angelic Sisters in San Paolo;
- Filippo Pasquale (1681-?), Prince of Modena and Reggio;
- Cristina Francesca (1683-1703), married Carlo Maria San Martino di Aglié, 5th Marquis of San Germano.
