= Monticelli Pavese =

Monticelli Pavese Montsé (Lombard)
- Comune
- Comune di Monticelli Pavese
- Location within Italy Location within Lombardy
- Coordinates: 45°7′N 9°31′E
- Country: Italy
- Region: Lombardy
- Province: Province of Pavia (PV)

Area
  - Total: 20.2 km^{2} (7.8 sq mi)

Population (Dec. 2004)
  - Total: 737
  - Density: 36.5/km^{2} (94.5/sq mi)
- Time zone: UTC+1 (CET)
  - Summer (DST): UTC+2 (CEST)
- Postal code: 27010
- Dialing code: 0382

Monticelli Pavese (Lombard: Montsé) is a comune (municipality) in the Province of Pavia in the Italian region Lombardy, located about 50 km (31 mi) southeast of Milan and about 30 km (19 mi) east of Pavia. As of 31 December 2004, it had a population of 737 and an area of 20.2 km^{2} (7.8 sq mi).

Monticelli Pavese borders the following municipalities: Badia Pavese, Calendasco, Chignolo Po, Orio Litta, Pieve Porto Morone, Rottofreno, Sarmato.

== Demographic evolution ==
Historical population

Year	Pop.	±%
1861	1,612	—
1871	1,683	+4.4%
1881	1,666	−1.0%
1901	1,771	+6.3%
1911	1,816	+2.5%

Year	Pop.	±%
1921	1,697	−6.6%
1931	1,483	−12.6%
1936	1,421	−4.2%
1951	1,331	−6.3%
1961	1,056	−20.7%

Year	Pop.	±%
1971	780	−26.1%
1981	696	−10.8%
1991	683	−1.9%
2001	667	−2.3%

Source: Data from ISTAT
