= Portalbera =

- Comune
- Comune di Portalbera
- Via XX Settembre, Portalbera

- Location within Italy Location within Lombardy
- Coordinates: 45°6′N 9°19′E
- Country: Italy
- Region: Lombardy
- Province: Province of Pavia (PV)
- Frazioni: San Pietro

Area
  - Total: 4.7 km^{2} (1.8 sq mi)

Population (Dec. 2004)
  - Total: 1,434
  - Density: 310/km^{2} (790/sq mi)
- Time zone: UTC+1 (CET)
  - Summer (DST): UTC+2 (CEST)
- Postal code: 27040
- Dialing code: 0385

Portalbera is a comune (municipality) in the Province of Pavia in the Italian region Lombardy, located about 40 km (25 mi) southeast of Milan and about 15 km (9.3 mi) southeast of Pavia. As of 31 December 2004, it had a population of 1,434 and an area of 4.7 km^{2} (1.8 sq mi).

The municipality of Portalbera contains the frazione (subdivision) San Pietro.

Portalbera borders the following municipalities: Arena Po, Spessa, Stradella.

== Demographic evolution ==
Historical population

Year	Pop.	±%
1861	1,532	—
1871	1,773	+15.7%
1881	1,786	+0.7%
1901	1,792	+0.3%
1911	1,743	−2.7%

Year	Pop.	±%
1921	1,702	−2.4%
1931	1,634	−4.0%
1936	1,596	−2.3%
1951	1,477	−7.5%
1961	1,407	−4.7%

Year	Pop.	±%
1971	1,152	−18.1%
1981	1,100	−4.5%
1991	1,160	+5.5%
2001	1,343	+15.8%

Source: Data from ISTAT
