= Sarmato =

- Comune
- Comune di Sarmato
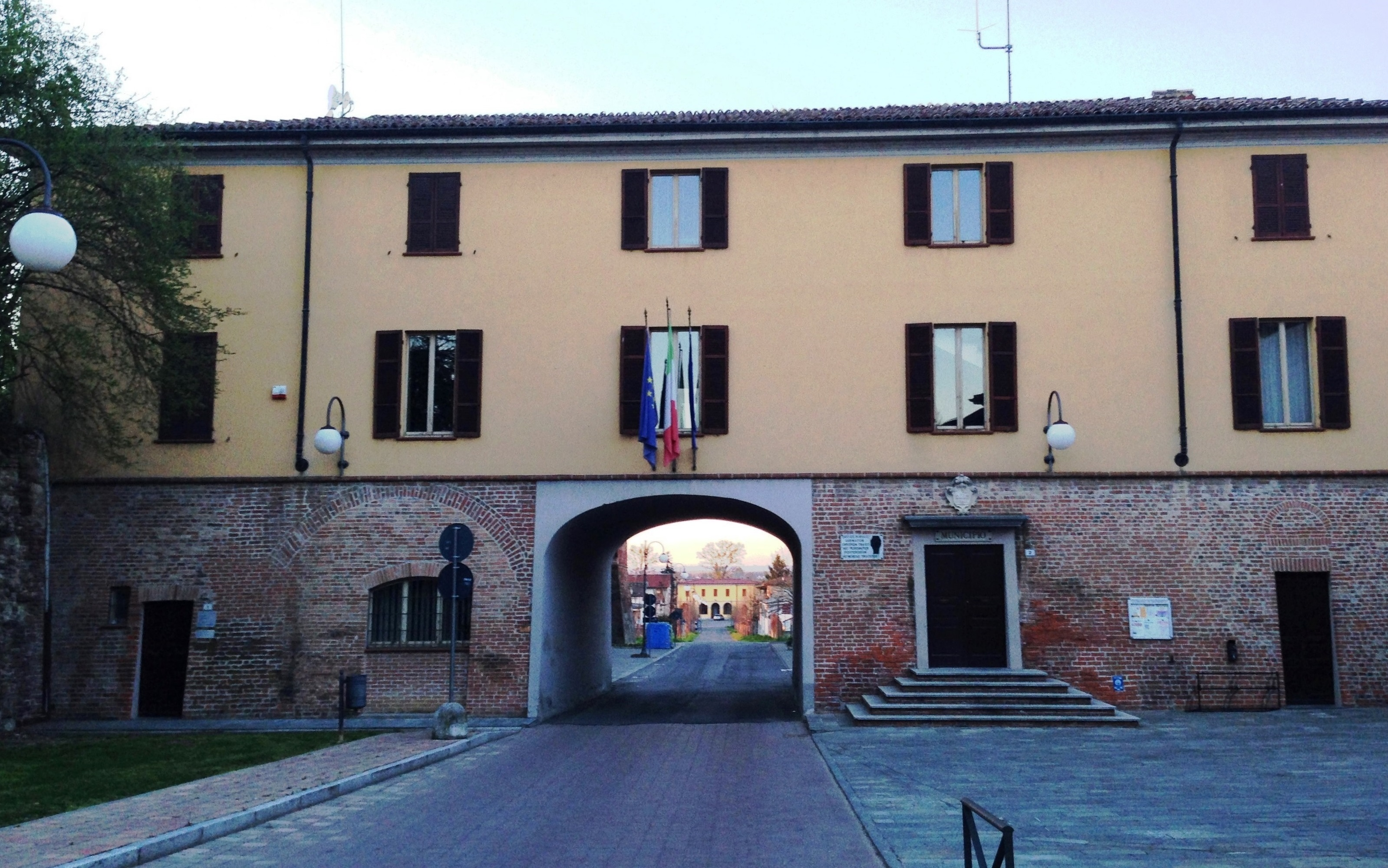
- Sarmato City Hall

- Location within Italy Location within Emilia-Romagna
- Coordinates: 45°4′N 9°29′E
- Country: Italy
- Region: Emilia-Romagna
- Province: Province of Piacenza (PC)

Government
  - Mayor: Claudia Ferrari

Area
  - Total: 27.0 km^{2} (10.4 sq mi)

Population (Dec. 2004)
  - Total: 2,714
  - Density: 101/km^{2} (260/sq mi)
- Demonym: Sarmatesi
- Time zone: UTC+1 (CET)
  - Summer (DST): UTC+2 (CEST)
- Postal code: 29010
- Dialing code: 0523
- Website: Official website

Sarmato (Piacentino: Särmat) is a comune (municipality) in the Province of Piacenza in the Italian region Emilia-Romagna, located about 160 kilometres (99 mi) northwest of Bologna and about 15 kilometres (9 mi) west of Piacenza. As of 31 December 2004, it had a population of 2,714 and an area of 27.0 square kilometres (10.4 mi^{2}). Sarmato borders the following municipalities: Borgonovo Val Tidone, Castel San Giovanni, Monticelli Pavese, Pieve Porto Morone, Rottofreno.

== Geography ==
The town and its municipal area are located in the Po Valley, by the Po and Tidone rivers. The municipality is situated at north-west area of province of Piacenza and it borders with province of Pavia in Lombardy. Sarmato borders the following municipalities: Castel San Giovanni, Borgonovo Val Tidone, Rottofreno, Pieve Porto Morone (PV) and Monticelli Pavese (PV).

The municipal area includes main town and also following boroughs: Agazzino, Cà dell’Acqua, Casoni, Cepone, Coste di Sotto, Madonna del Rosario, Nosone, Ponte Tidone, Salumificio, and Veratto. Near Veratto, the Tidone flows into the Po.

== Climate ==
Sarmato belongs to climate zone E. It has a continental climate with hot and wet summer, and cold and wet winter. During fall and winter, fog is often frequently present.

== Economy ==
The main economy activity is agriculture. The principal plantations are: cereals (mainly wheat and mais), fodder and vegetables (especially tomato). An important branch is zootechnics, especially bovine farming. Regarding industries, there are advanced food factories, building factories, metalworking factories and factories that produce glass, plastic, and rubber. A tertiary sector is composed of small network of stores, services and banks. Every Friday morning there is a weekly market.

== Transportation ==
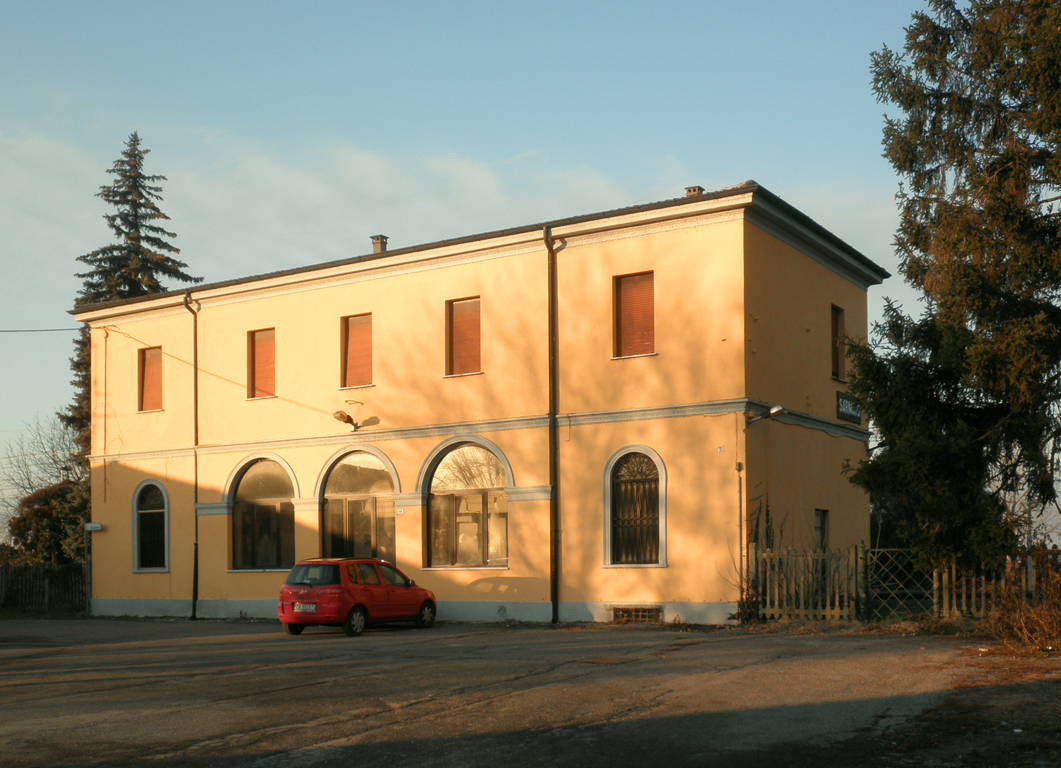
Railway station

The Padana Inferiore state road crosses the municipal area, and it is the main access way.

Sarmato is on bus line Piacenza-Nibbiano Caminata served by SETA.

Railway station is located on line Alessandria-Piacenza.

The A21 Torino Piacenza highway crosses the municipal area. The closet tool booth highway is tool booth of Castel San Giovanni (located on A21 highway) and it is distant almost 8 km.

The closet main airports are Malpensa, Linate e Orio al Serio.

Between 1893 and 1938, Sarmato was on tram line Piacenza-Pianello-Nibbiano.

== Demographic evolution ==
Historical population

Year	Pop.	±%
1861	2,551	—
1871	2,838	+11.3%
1881	2,810	−1.0%
1901	3,123	+11.1%
1911	3,326	+6.5%

Year	Pop.	±%
1921	3,361	+1.1%
1931	3,201	−4.8%
1936	3,079	−3.8%
1951	3,041	−1.2%
1961	2,753	−9.5%

Year	Pop.	±%
1971	2,640	−4.1%
1981	2,523	−4.4%
1991	2,583	+2.4%
2001	2,589	+0.2%

Source: Data from ISTAT

== Ethnic groups ==
On the date 31 December 2012, the foreign inhabitants in municipality of Sarmato are 538[6] and they represent the 18.2% of population. The nations more represented are:

Country	Population (2012)	Percentage %
Morocco	128	23,8
Romania	102	19,0
Albania	82	15,2
Tunisia	37	6,9
Bosnia-Herzegovina	25	4,6
Ukraine	24	4,5

== Government and administration ==
Following table is the history of the municipal administrations.

Start Mandate	End Mandate	Mayor	Party
26 June 1985	25 May 1990	Luigi Bozzini	Italian Communist Party
25 May 1990	24 April 1995	Rino Curtoni	N.A.
24 April 1995	14 June 1999	Sergio Romanini	Civil List
14 June 1999	16 August 2003	Mauro Torregiani	Civil List
14 June 2004	6 August 2009	Sabrina Gallinari	Civil List
6 August 2009	26 May 2014	Anna Tanzi	Popolo delle libertà and Lega Nord
26 May 2014	Available	Anna Tanzi	Civil List

== Sports ==
The soccer team of Sarmato is FCD Sarmatese that currently play in prima categoria league. The team has youth sectors.

There are:

- a soccer field for 11 players (playground of FCD Sarmatese team)
- a soccer field for 7 players (near the church)
- an outdoor soccer field for 5 players (in synthetic grass)
- an outdoor basketball field
- a swimming pool with two beach volley fields
- a multipurpose gymnasium used also for basketball and volleyball)
