= Santa Cristina e Bissone =

- Comune
- Comune di Santa Cristina e Bissone
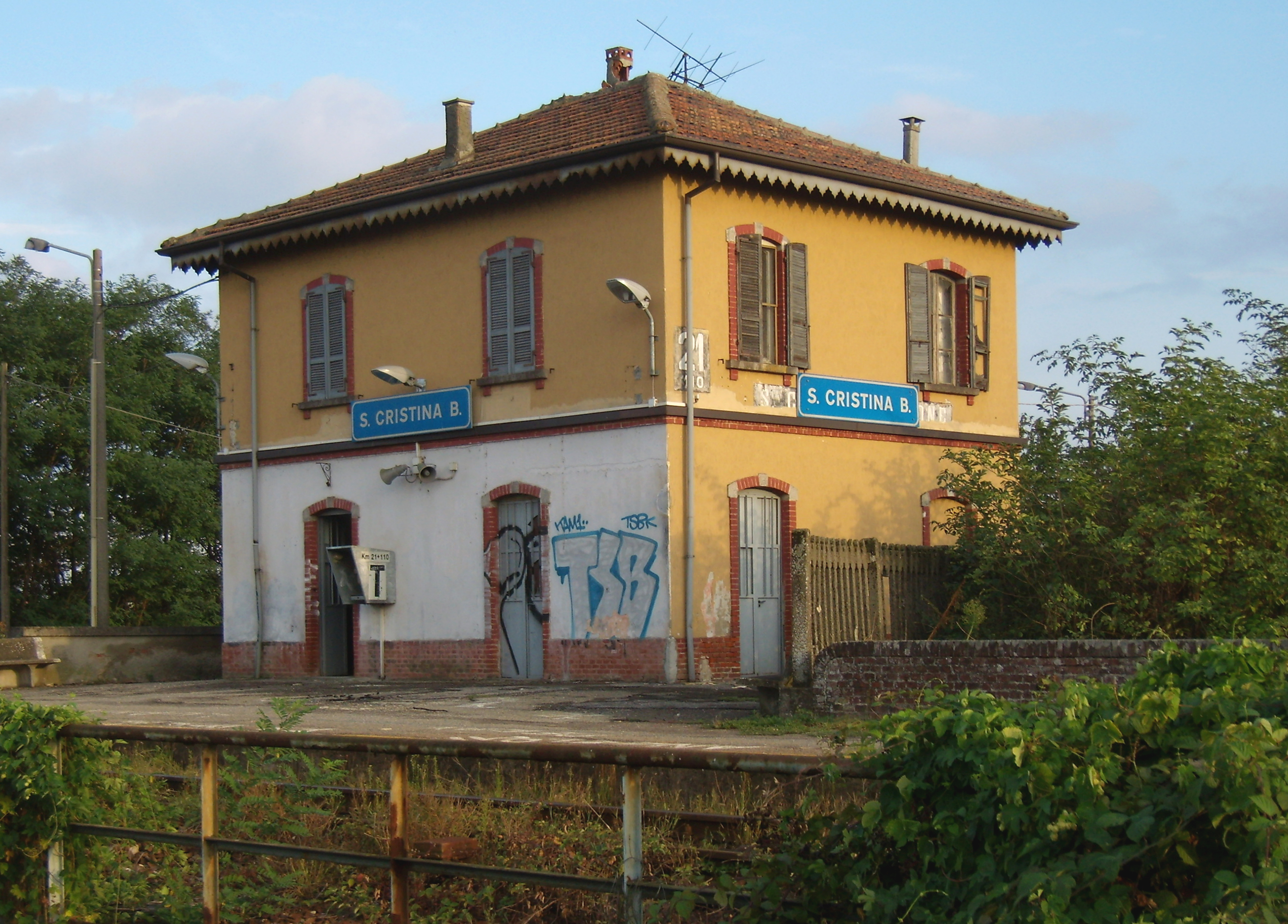
- Railway station.

- Location within Italy Location within Lombardy
- Coordinates: 45°09′27″N 9°23′59″E
- Country: Italy
- Region: Lombardy
- Province: Pavia (PV)
- Frazioni: Santa Cristina (municipal seat), Bissone

Government
  - Mayor: Pietro Antonio Del Redentore

Area
  - Total: 22.42 km^{2} (8.66 sq mi)

Population (30 September 2015)
  - Total: 2,021
  - Density: 90.14/km^{2} (233.5/sq mi)
- Demonym: Santacristinesi
- Time zone: UTC+1 (CET)
  - Summer (DST): UTC+2 (CEST)
- Postal code: 27010
- Dialing code: 0382
- Patron saint: St. Cristina
- Saint day: 24 July
- Website: Official website

Santa Cristina e Bissone is a comune (municipality) in the province of Pavia, Lombardy, northern Italy, located about 45 km southeast of Milan and about 25 km southeast of Pavia.

Santa Cristina e Bissone borders the following municipalities: Badia Pavese, Chignolo Po, Corteolona e Genzone, Costa de' Nobili, Inverno e Monteleone, Miradolo Terme, Pieve Porto Morone.

The town lies along the Via Francigena.
