= Carlo Filiberto I d'Este =

- Prince of the Holy Roman Empire; Prince of Ferrara, Modena and Reggio; 2nd Marquis of San Martino in Rio; 3rd Marquis of Borgomanero and Porlezza; 1st Marquis of Santa Cristina; 4th Count of Corteolona; Lord of Campogalliano and Castellarano
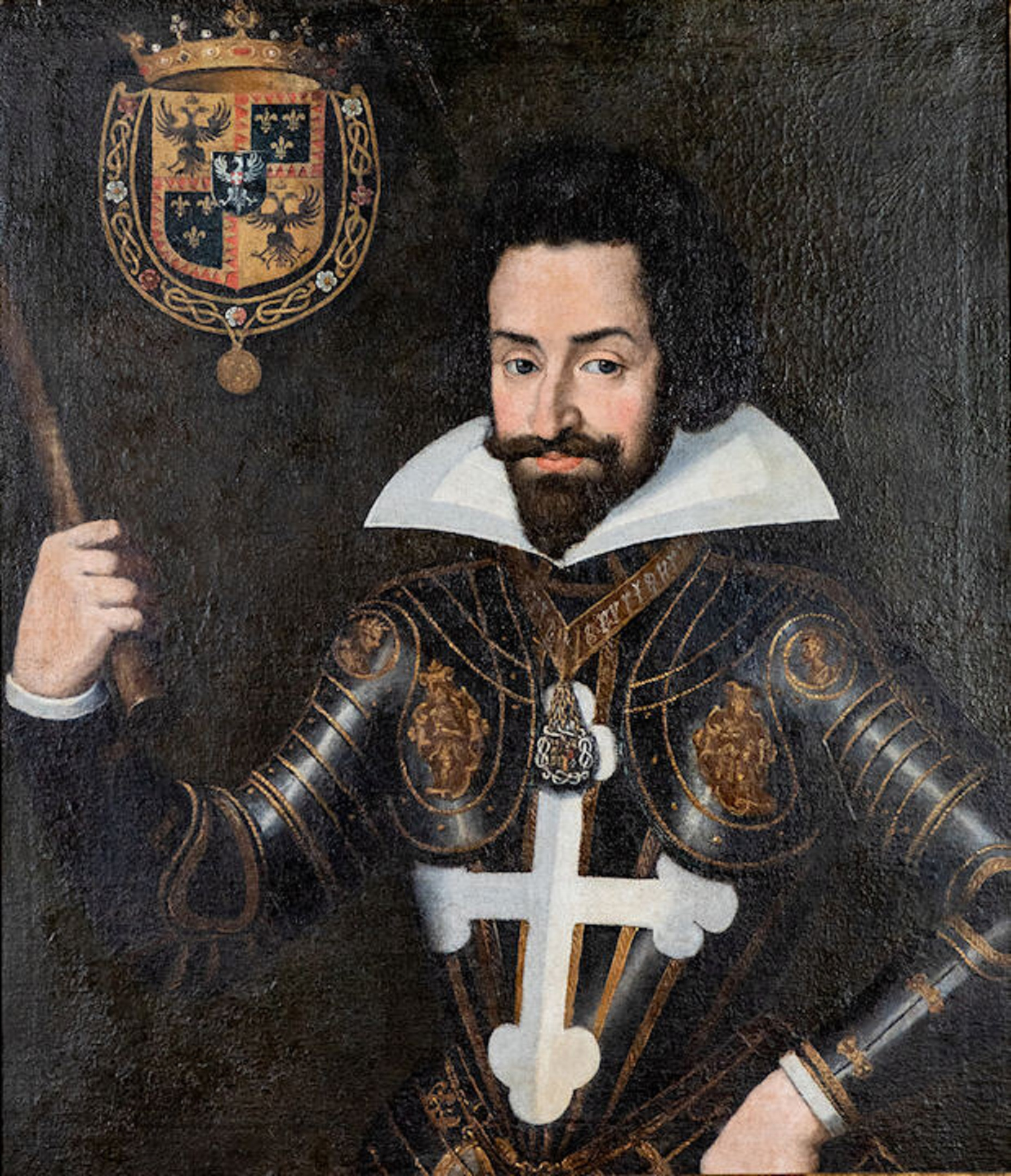

Marquis of San Martino
- Reign: 1592 – 1652
- Predecessor: Filippo I d'Este
- Successor: Filippo II Francesco d'Este

Marquis of Borgomanero and Porlezza
- Reign: 1592 – 1652
- Predecessor: Filippo I d'Este
- Successor: Carlo Emmanuel d'Este

Marquis of Santa Cristina
- Reign: 1616 – 1652
- Predecessor: Title created
- Successor: Carlo Emanuele d'Este
- Born: c. 1571; San Martino in Rio
- Died: 26 May 1652 (aged 80–81); Milan
- Burial: Collegiata di San Martino in Rio
- Spouse: Luisa de Cárdenas y Carrillo de Albornoz (m. 1606; died 1624); Livia de Marini Castagna
- House: Este di San Martino
- Father: Filippo I d'Este
- Mother: Maria of Savoy
- Religion: Roman Catholicism

Carlo Filiberto I d'Este (c. 1571 – 26 May 1652) was an Italian nobleman who was Marquis of San Martino, Borgomanero and Porlezza, and Santa Cristina.

He was the eldest son of Filippo I d'Este and Maria of Savoy, Lady of San Martino, the legitimized daughter of Duke Emmanuel Philibert of Savoy. Dying without issue, he passed the Marquisates of San Martino, Borgomanero and Porlezza, and Santa Cristina to his nephews Filippo Francesco and Carlo Emmanuel respectively.

== Biography ==
Carlo Filiberto was born in c. 1571, he was the eldest son of Filippo I d'Este and Maria of Savoy, Lady of San Martino, the legitimized daughter of Duke Emmanuel Philibert of Savoy.

In 1592, two months before his father's death, Carlo Filiberto had been appointed head of the nobility in the retinue of the Duke of Savoy, when the latter was at war; in 1593, having taken care of the first tasks of the fiefdom, he returned to Piedmont, leaving his brothers Sigismondo and Alfonso in San Martino.

In 1602, he was awarded the Supreme Order of the Most Holy Annunciation.

In June 1603, together with Giovanni Botero and the Count of Masino, he accompanied the three eldest sons of the Duke of Savoy, Charles Emmanuel I (Philip Emmanuel, Victor Amadeus, and Emmanuel Philibert), to Spain. They first arrived in Valladolid, arriving at the Spanish court at the end of August. Upon returning from the trip to Spain, following the breakdown of relations between the courts of Turin and Madrid, Carlo Filiberto opted for loyalty to the House of Habsburg, while his brother Sigismondo remained faithful to the House of Savoy.

In 1616, Carlo Filiberto returned the Supreme Order of the Most Holy Annunciation, he was later made a Knight of Order of the Golden Fleece. The same year, he entered into the service of Philip III of Spain, officially resigning from his posts in Savoy. His first post in Spain was in the Duchy of Milan. In Spain, he was knows as the Marquis of Este (marqués de Este).

In 1618, Carlo Filiberto published the Constitutions for the territories of San Martino in Rio, Campogalliano and Castellarano.

In 1619, Carlo Filiberto was appointed as a close advisor of Emperor Matthias. In 1623, King Philip IV of Spain established a household for his brother, the Cardinal-Infante Ferdinand, and on June 12, 1622, Carlo Filiberto was appointed as his Master of the Horse and Gentleman of the Bedchamber.

In 1606, Carlo Filiberto married Luisa de Cárdenas y Carrillo de Albornoz and, after becoming a widower on May 13, 1624, he remarried Livia de Marini Castagna. He had no children.

Carlo Filibert died in Milan on 26 May 1652 and was transported with solemn pomp and placed in the family tomb, near the altar of the Blessed Sacrament inside the collegiate church of San Martino in Rio.

Carlo Filiberto left Filippo II Francesco d'Este, the eldest son of his brother Sigismondo, as heir to the Marquisate of San Martino The succession of the Marquisate of Borgomanero and Porlezza was rather complicated and saw first the transmission of the fief of Porlezza on 5 April 1652, by way of deposit to his nephew Carlo Emmanuel d'Este, the second son of his brother; finally, in order to obtain the formal investiture for Borgomanero, Porlezza and Belgioioso on 20 December 1653, he had to renounce all claims to the Piedmontese fief of Lanzo.
