= Spessa =

- Comune
- Comune di Spessa
- Location within Italy Location within Lombardy
- Coordinates: 45°7′N 9°21′E
- Country: Italy
- Region: Lombardy
- Province: Province of Pavia (PV)

Area
  - Total: 12.2 km^{2} (4.7 sq mi)

Population (Dec. 2004)
  - Total: 545
  - Density: 44.7/km^{2} (116/sq mi)
- Time zone: UTC+1 (CET)
  - Summer (DST): UTC+2 (CEST)
- Postal code: 27010
- Dialing code: 0382

Spessa is a comune (municipality) in the Province of Pavia in the Italian region Lombardy, which is located about 40 km (25 mi) southeast of Milan and about 15 km (9.3 mi) southeast of Pavia. As of 31 December 2004, it had a population of 545 and an area of 12.2 km^{2} (4.7 sq mi).

Spessa borders the following municipalities: Arena Po, Belgioioso, Costa de' Nobili, Portalbera, San Cipriano Po, San Zenone al Po, Stradella, Torre de' Negri.

== Demographic evolution ==
Historical population

Year	Pop.	±%
1861	843	—
1871	977	+15.9%
1881	904	−7.5%
1901	862	−4.6%
1911	745	−13.6%

Year	Pop.	±%
1921	763	+2.4%
1931	681	−10.7%
1936	659	−3.2%
1951	637	−3.3%
1961	525	−17.6%

Year	Pop.	±%
1971	398	−24.2%
1981	389	−2.3%
1991	468	+20.3%
2001	525	+12.2%

Source: Data from ISTAT
