= Filippo II Francesco d'Este =

- Marquis of San Martino; 3rd Marquess of Lanzo, Groscavallo, Forno, and Vonzo; 3rd Marquess of San Martino in Rio; 1st Marquess of Dronero, Roccabruna, and San Giuliano; 5th Count of Corteolona; Lord of Campogalliano and Castellarano
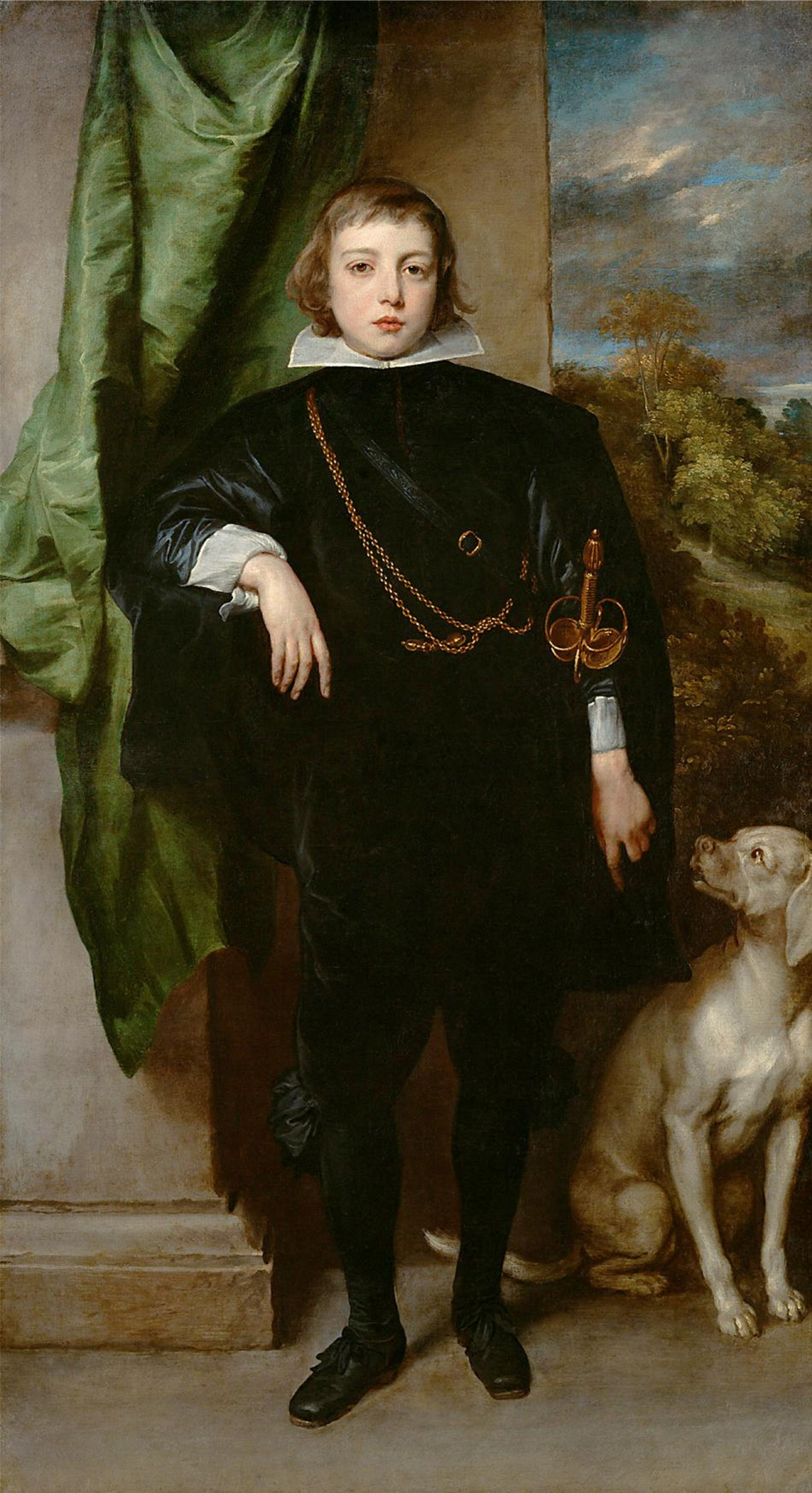
- Portrait of Filippo Francesco d'Este by Anthony van Dyck

Marquis of San Martino
- Reign: 1652–1653
- Predecessor: Carlo Filiberto I d'Este
- Successor: Sigismondo III d'Este

Marquis of Lanzo
- Reign: 1628–1653
- Predecessor: Sigismondo d'Este
- Successor: Sigismondo III d'Este

Marquis of Dronero
- Reign: 1646–1653
- Predecessor: Title created
- Successor: Carlo Filiberto d'Este
- Born: c. 1621
- Died: c. 1653
- Spouse: Margherita of Savoy
- Issue Detail: Sigismondo III d'Este; Carlo Filiberto; Angelica d'Este
- House: Este di San Martino
- Father: Sigismondo d'Este, Marquis of Lanzo
- Mother: Françoise Charledes d'Antel d'Hôtel
- Religion: Roman Catholicism

Filippo II Francesco d'Este (c. 1621 – c. 1653) was the son of Sigismondo d'Este, 2nd Marquis of Lanzo, and Françoise Charledes d'Antel d'Hôtel. He succeeded his father as Marquis of Lanzo in 1628.

== Biography ==
Filippo II Francesco was the son of Sigismondo d'Este, 2nd Marquis of Lanzo and Françoise Charledes d'Antel d'Hôtel; his father's brother was Carlo Filiberto I d'Este, 2nd Marquis of San Martino in Rio and annexed jurisdictions, from whom he inherited the fiefdom in 1652, upon the latter's death without male heirs.

His brother Carlo Emanuele, 4th Marquis of Borgomanero and Porlezza and 2nd Marquis of Santa Cristina was Governor of San Martino in Rio. While in Spain with their uncle, they were also the subject of portraits by Anthony van Dyck.

On 30 November 1645 the wedding contract with Margherita of Savoy, legitimised daughter of the Duke of Savoy Charles Emmanuel I, was solemnly signed.

Filippo Francesco, who had inherited the fiefdom in 1652, governed for only one year, dying at the end of 1653; the heir was his firstborn, only six years old, who began the government of the fiefdom under the regency of his mother.

His second-born son, Carlo Filiberto, began the short-lived line of the Este family of Dronero.

== Issue ==
Filippo and his wife, Margherita, had three children.

- Sigismondo III (1647–1732): 4th Marquis of Lanzo with Bonzo, Groscavallo and Forno. 4th Marquis of San Martino in Rio. 6th Count of Corteolona, Lord of Campogalliano, Castellarano. Lord of the Vicariate of Belgioioso;
- Carlo Filiberto (1649–1703): 2nd Marquis of Dronero, San Giuliano and Roccabruna. Governor of Savoy and Turin. Founder of the Este-Dronero line;
- Angelica: Augustinian nun of the Congregation of the Angelic Sisters in the Monastery of San Paolo.
