= Sigismondo d'Este, Marquis of Lanzo =

Sigismondo d'Este
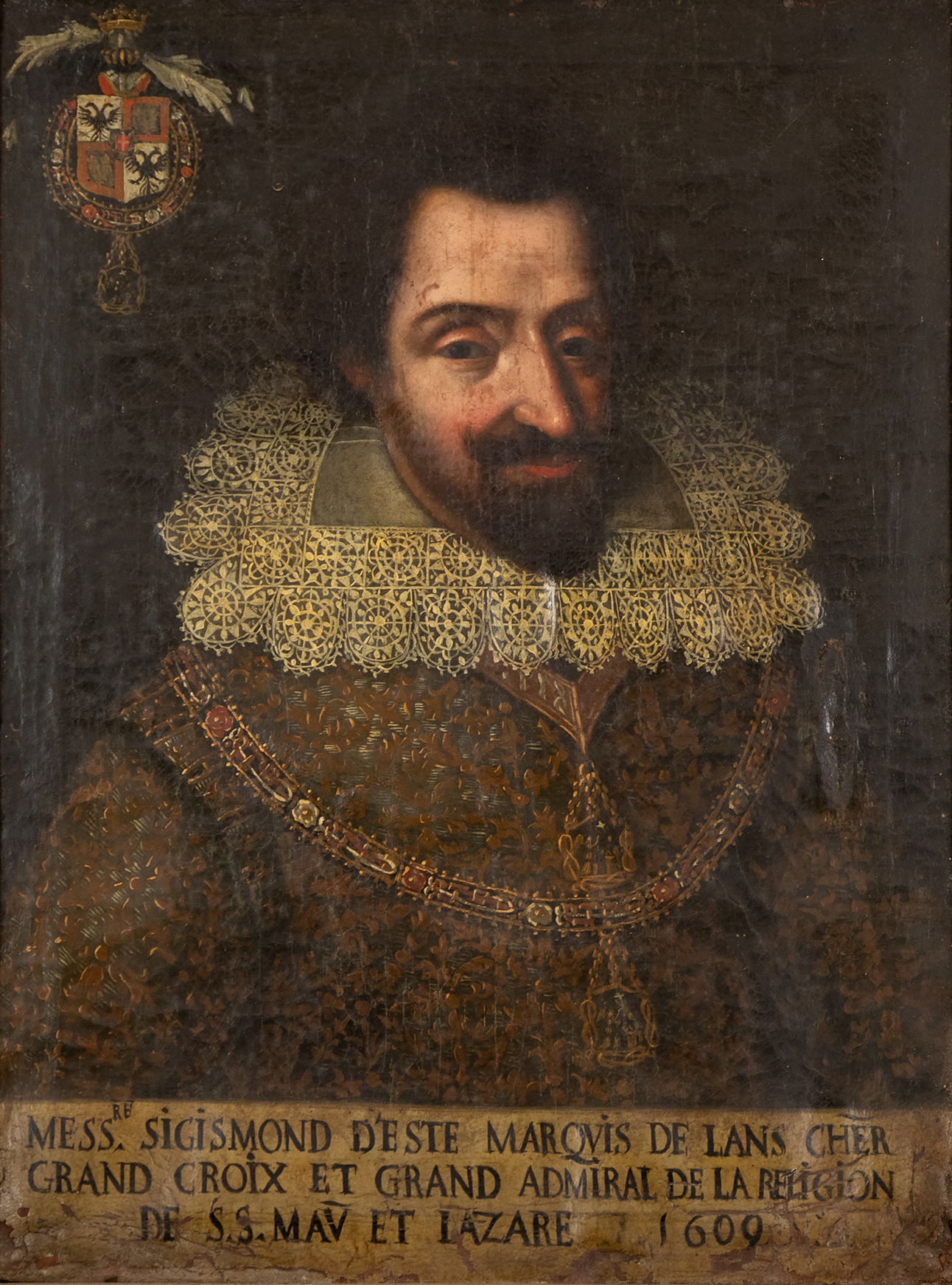

Marquis of Lanzo
- Predecessor: Filippo I d'Este
- Successor: Filippo II Francesco
- Born: 26 June 1572; Turin
- Died: 25 July 1628 (aged 56); Turin
- Spouse: Françoise Charledes d'Antel d'Hostel (m. 1618)
- Issue Detail: Filippo II Francesco d'Este; Carlo Emmanuel d'Este; Cristina d'Este
- House: Este di San Martino
- Father: Filippo I d'Este
- Mother: Maria of Savoy, Lady of San Martino
- Religion: Roman Catholicism

Sigismondo d'Este (26 June 1572 – 25 July 1628) was an Italian nobleman. He was the son of Filippo I d'Este and Maria of Savoy, Lady of San Martino, the legitimized daughter of Duke Emmanuel Philibert of Savoy.

== Biography ==
Sigismondo was born on June 26, 1572 as second son of Filippo I d'Este and Maria of Savoy, Lady of San Martino, the legitimized daughter of Emmanuel Philibert of Savoy and his mistress Laura Crevola.

He was made a Prince of Holy Roman Empire by Emperor Ferdinand II, this title however, was non-tranferable.

Sigismondo married the noblewoman Françoise Charledes d'Antel d'Hostel, and in 1621, their eldest child, Filippo Francesco, was born. Filippo Francesco would go on to inherit the Marquisate of San Martino upon the death of Carlo Filiberto I d'Este.

Sigismondo was awarded the Supreme Order of the Most Holy Annunciation; during his life he remained faithful to the House of Savoy, even when his elder brother Carlo Filiberto I d'Este broke off relations with the Dukes of Savoy, remaining faithful to the Habsburgs.

Sigismondo died on July 25, 1628, in Turn.

== Issue ==
In 1618 he married Françoise Charledes d'Antel d'Hostel; from the marriage were born:

- Filippo Francesco (1621-1653): 3rd Marquis of Lanzo, 3rd Marquis of San Martino in Rio, 1st Marquis of Dronero
- Carlo Emmanuel (1622-1695): 4th Marquis of Borgomanero and Porlezza, 2nd Marquis of Santa Cristina. Governor of San Martino.
- Cristina: Who becam an Augustinian nun.
