= Lago di Trebecco =

Lake in Italy

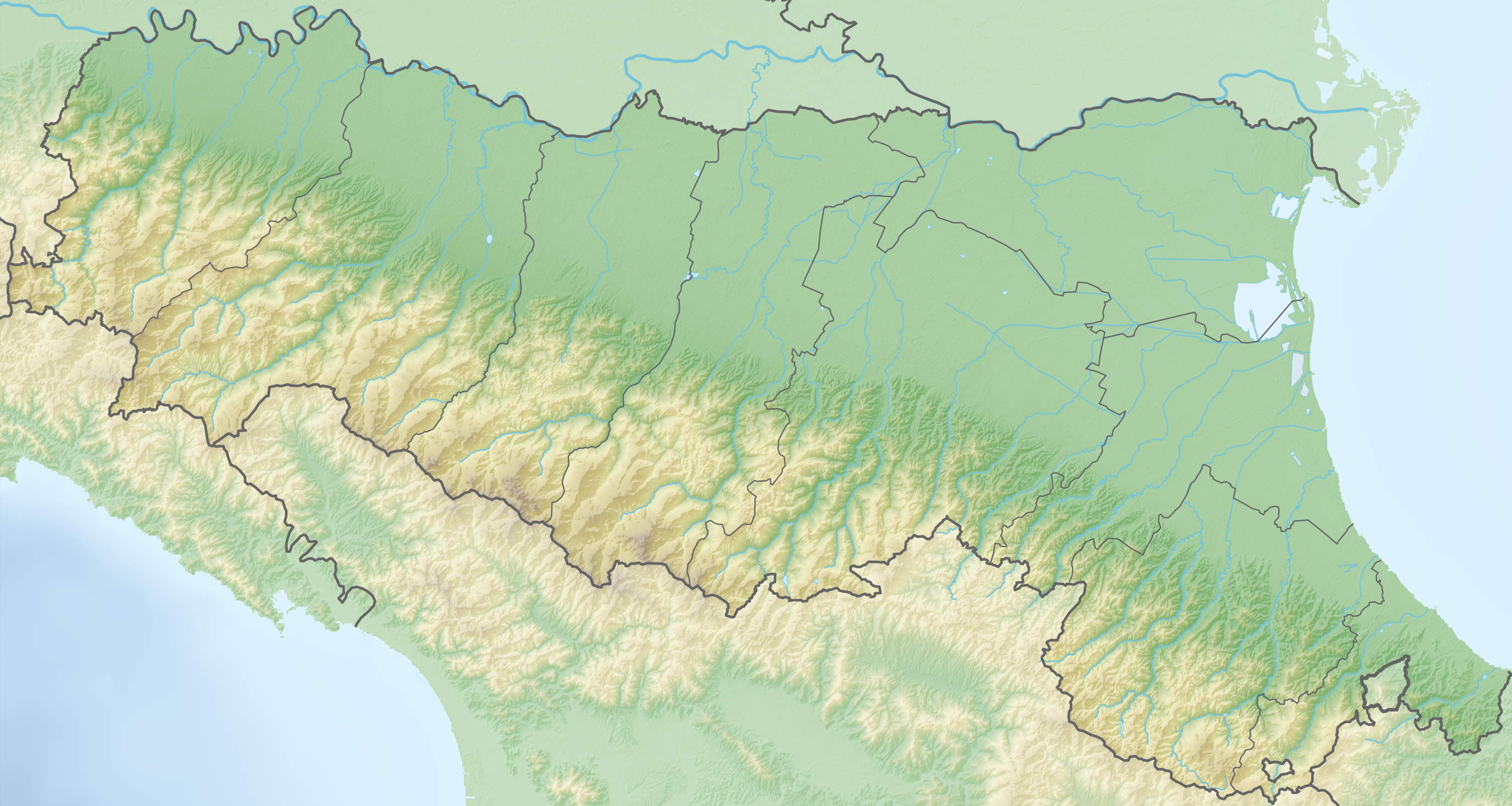
- Location within Emilia-Romagna
- Location: Province of Piacenza, Emilia-Romagna / Province of Pavia, Lombardy
- Coordinates: 44.901727°N 9.286108°E
- Primary inflows: Tidone, Morcione
- Primary outflows: Tidone
- Basin countries: Italy
- Surface elevation: 350 m (1,150 ft)

Lago di Trebecco is an artificial lake located along the Tidone river in the province of Piacenza, in the region of Emilia-Romagna, Italy. It is part of the Molato Dam, which finished construction in 1928.
