= Chignolo Po =

Chignolo Po Chignoeu (Lombard)
- Comune
- Comune di Chignolo Po
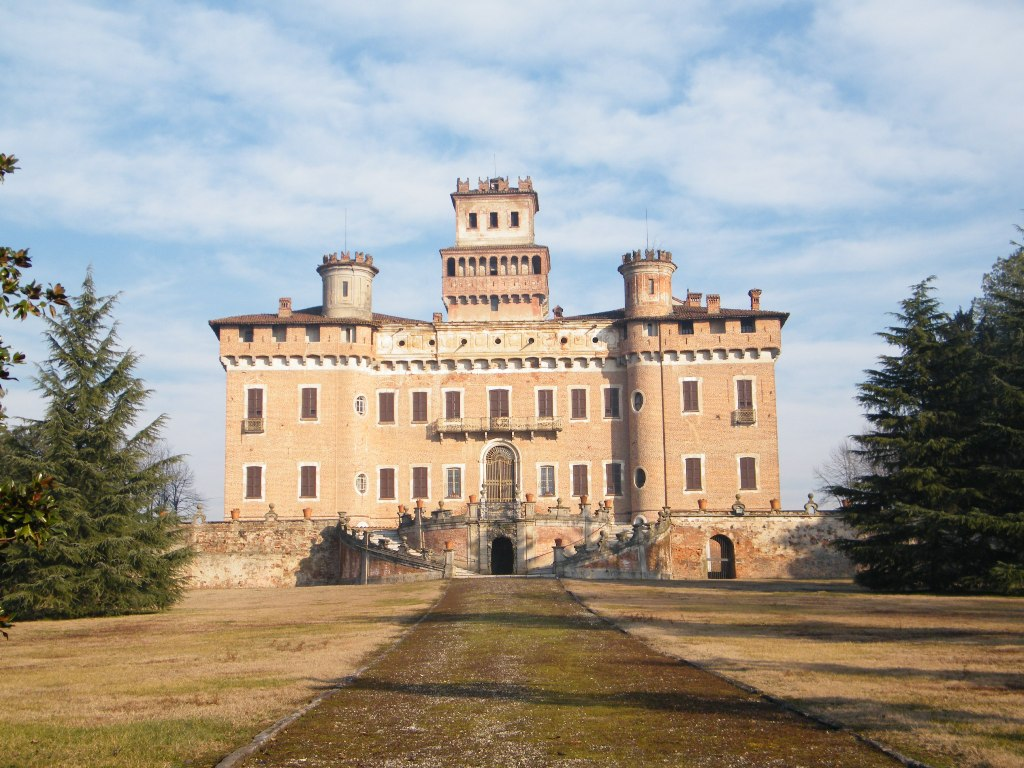

- Location within Italy Location within Lombardy
- Coordinates: 45°9′N 9°29′E
- Country: Italy
- Region: Lombardy
- Province: Province of Pavia (PV)
- Frazioni: Alberone, Lambrinia, Bosco

Area
  - Total: 23.1 km^{2} (8.9 sq mi)
- Elevation: 88 m (289 ft)

Population (Dec. 2004)
  - Total: 3,502
  - Density: 152/km^{2} (393/sq mi)
- Demonym: Chignolesi
- Time zone: UTC+1 (CET)
  - Summer (DST): UTC+2 (CEST)
- Postal code: 27013
- Dialing code: 0382
- Website: Official website

Chignolo Po (Italian: [kiɲˈɲɔːlo ˈpɔ]; Pavese: Chignoeu [kiˈɲøː]) is a comune (municipality) in the Province of Pavia in the Italian region of Lombardy, located about 45 km (28 mi) southeast of Milan and about 25 km (16 mi) east of Pavia. As of 31 December 2004, it had a population of 3502 and an area of 23.1 km^{2} (8.9 sq mi).

The municipality of Chignolo Po contains the frazioni (subdivisions, mainly villages and hamlets) Alberone, Lambrinia, and Bosco.

Chignolo Po borders the following municipalities: Badia Pavese, Miradolo Terme, Monticelli Pavese, Orio Litta, Rottofreno, San Colombano al Lambro, Santa Cristina e Bissone.

== Demographic evolution ==
Historical population

Year	Pop.	±%
1861	4,486	—
1871	5,061	+12.8%
1881	5,174	+2.2%
1901	5,466	+5.6%
1911	5,449	−0.3%

Year	Pop.	±%
1921	5,062	−7.1%
1931	4,752	−6.1%
1936	4,429	−6.8%
1951	4,341	−2.0%
1961	3,642	−16.1%

Year	Pop.	±%
1971	3,127	−14.1%
1981	3,018	−3.5%
1991	3,009	−0.3%
2001	3,234	+7.5%

Source: Data from ISTAT
