= Torre de' Negri =

- Comune
- Comune di Torre de' Negri
- Location within Italy Location within Lombardy
- Coordinates: 45°9′N 9°20′E
- Country: Italy
- Region: Lombardy
- Province: Pavia (PV)

Government
  - Mayor: Mara Riboni

Area
  - Total: 4.01 km^{2} (1.55 sq mi)
- Elevation: 73 m (240 ft)

Population (31 December 2010)
  - Total: 339
  - Density: 84.5/km^{2} (219/sq mi)
- Demonym: Torrenegrini
- Time zone: UTC+1 (CET)
  - Summer (DST): UTC+2 (CEST)
- Postal code: 27011
- Dialing code: 0382
- Website: Official website

Torre de' Negri is a comune (municipality) in the Province of Pavia in the Italian region Lombardy, located about 40 km southeast of Milan and about 15 km east of Pavia.

Torre de' Negri borders the following municipalities: Belgioioso, Corteolona e Genzone, Costa de' Nobili, Spessa.
