= Filippo I d'Este =

- 2nd Marquis of Borgomanero and Porlezza; 1st Marquis of San Martino in Rio; 1st Marquis of Lanzo with Groscavallo, Forno and Bonzo; 3rd Count of Corteolona; Lord of Campogalliano and Castellarano, San Cassiano and Rodeglia; Lord of the Vicariate of Belgioioso; Lord of Crevacuore.

Lord of San Martino
- Reign: 1561 – 1588
- Predecessor: Sigismondo II d'Este
- Successor: Title elevated to Marquessate

Lord of Lanzo
- Reign: 1577 – 1580
- Predecessor: Title created
- Successor: Title elevated to Marquessate

Marquess of San Martino
- Reign: 1588 – 1592
- Predecessor: Title elevated from Lordship
- Successor: Carlo Filiberto I d'Este

Marquess of Borgomanero and Porlezza
- Reign: 1561 – 1592
- Predecessor: Sigismondo II d'Este
- Successor: Carlo Filiberto I d'Este

Marquess of Lanzo
- Reign: 1580 – 1592
- Predecessor: Title elevated from Lordship
- Successor: Sigismondo d'Este
- Born: c. 1537; Ferrara, Duchy of Ferrara
- Died: 13 December 1592 (aged 54–55); Ferrara, Duchy of Ferrara
- Spouse: Maria of Savoy, Lady of San Martino (m. 1570; died 1580)
- Issue Detail: Carlo Filiberto; Margherita; Sigismondo; Alfonso; Beatrice Matilde
- House: Este of San Martino
- Father: Sigismondo II d'Este
- Mother: Giustina Trivulzio
- Religion: Catholicism

Filippo I d'Este (c. 1537 – 13 December 1592) was an Italian nobleman who became the Lord of San Martino and Lanzo, which were later elevated to Marquessates.

== Biography ==
Filippo was born in 1537, to Sigismondo II d'Este and his wife Giustina Trivulzio, who was a member of the Trivulzio family. In 1561, upon the death of his father in Pavia, where he served as governor, Filippo succeeded his father's titles.

On 25 March 1569, he was granted the Supreme Order of the Most Holy Annunciation. On 20 January 1570, he married Maria of Savoy, Lady of San Martino, the legitimized daughter Duke Emmanuel Philibert of Savoy, on 25 February, for Maria's dowry, he received the territory of Crevacuore. In 1571, he was made the General of the Light Cavalry of the Duke of Savoy. In 1572, on behalf of Duke Emmanuel Philibert, Filippo was sent as an ambassador to Pope Gregory XIII in Rome, so that the Order of St. Maurice could be confirmed to the Duchy of Savoy and to receive the assent to the merger with the Order of St. Lazarus.

In 1574, Filippo was made "captain general of the people to be sent to France in the service of the most Christian King". In 1577, Duke Emmanuel Philibert wanted to reclaim the territory of Crevacuore, hence, he granted Filippo the Marquisate of Lanzo, along with the surrounding Lanzo Valleys. On April 14, 1577, Filippo was officially granted the feudal rights of the Marquisate of Lanzo, along with the territories of Ala, Balme, Bonzo (with Mottera), Cantoira, Ceres, Chialambertetto, Chialamberto, Forno di Groscavallo, Germagnano, Groscavallo, Mezzenile, Monastero, Mondrone, Pessinetto, Traves, and Vonzo. On April 11, the contract of the exchange was finalized.

Upon the death of his wife on October 28, 1580, Filippo inherited the palace in Turin. However, because the Marquisate of Lanzo was technically Maria's personal appanage as her dowry, it was bequeathed to their second-born son, Sigismondo. In 1583, Filippo came into possession of Valentino Castle, which he held until 1586, when he exchanged it with the House of Savoy for Lucento Castle. In May 1588, he became the ambassador on behalf of Savoy to Spain.

In 1591, he was the ambassador to Rome on behalf of Alfonso II d'Este to Pope Gregory XIV, in order to obtain papal confirmation of the ascension of Alfonso.

Filippo was a close friend of the poet Torquato Tasso, who dedicated verses in the Dialogo della Nobiltà to him.

Filippo died on 13 December 1592, in Ferrara.

== Issue ==
From his marriage to Maria of Savoy were born:

- Beatrice Matilde (1570–1609 or 1611), married on 8 June 1602 Ferrante di Ippolito I Bentivoglio, Marquis of Gualtieri and Magliano (?–1619).
- Carlo Filiberto I (1571–1652), 2nd Marquis of San Martino in Rio, 3rd Marquis of Borgomanero and Porlezza, 1st Marquis of Santa Cristina and 4th Count of Corteolona;
- Sigismondo (1572–1628), 2nd Marquis of Lanzo
- Alfonso (1573–1623), Commander of St. John of the Canton of Modena of the Order of Jerusalem;
- Margherita (1574 - ?).

Filippo also had an illegitimate son, whom he legitimized:

- Francesco (1568–1646), Knight and Governor of San Martino in Rio, who had four sons:
  - Beatrice;
  - Carlo Filiberto;
  - Alfonso;
  - Giustina.
