= Pieve Porto Morone =

- Comune
- Comune di Pieve Porto Morone
- Location within Italy Location within Lombardy
- Coordinates: 45°7′N 9°26′E
- Country: Italy
- Region: Lombardy
- Province: Pavia (PV)

Government
  - Mayor: Virgilio Anselmi

Area
  - Total: 16.4 km^{2} (6.3 sq mi)
- Elevation: 58 m (190 ft)

Population (30 September 2015)
  - Total: 2,652
  - Density: 162/km^{2} (419/sq mi)
- Demonym: Pievesi
- Time zone: UTC+1 (CET)
  - Summer (DST): UTC+2 (CEST)
- Postal code: 27017
- Dialing code: 0382
- Website: Official website

Pieve Porto Morone is a comune (municipality) in the Province of Pavia in the Italian region Lombardy, located about 45 km southeast of Milan and about 25 km southeast of Pavia.

Pieve Porto Morone borders the following municipalities: Arena Po, Badia Pavese, Castel San Giovanni, Costa de' Nobili, Monticelli Pavese, Santa Cristina e Bissone, Sarmato, Zerbo.

== History ==
The origins of the town date back to the Middle Ages, and its name is linked to the word “Pieve,” which in Italy refers to the main rural church that served as a religious and administrative center for the surrounding villages. The name “Porto Morone” is related to its location near the Po River, where a small river crossing or port once existed and was used for transportation and trade in the past.

During the Middle Ages, the area was under the influence of nearby cities such as Pavia. It later became part of the Duchy of Milan, before eventually being incorporated into the unified Italy in the nineteenth century.

== Population ==
Historical population

Year	Pop.	±%
1981	2,771	—
1991	2,650	−4.4%
2001	2,598	−2.0%

Year	Pop.	±%
2011	2,788	+7.3%
2021	2,568	−7.9%
2024	2,664	+3.7%
