= Costa de' Nobili =

- Comune
- Comune di Costa de' Nobili
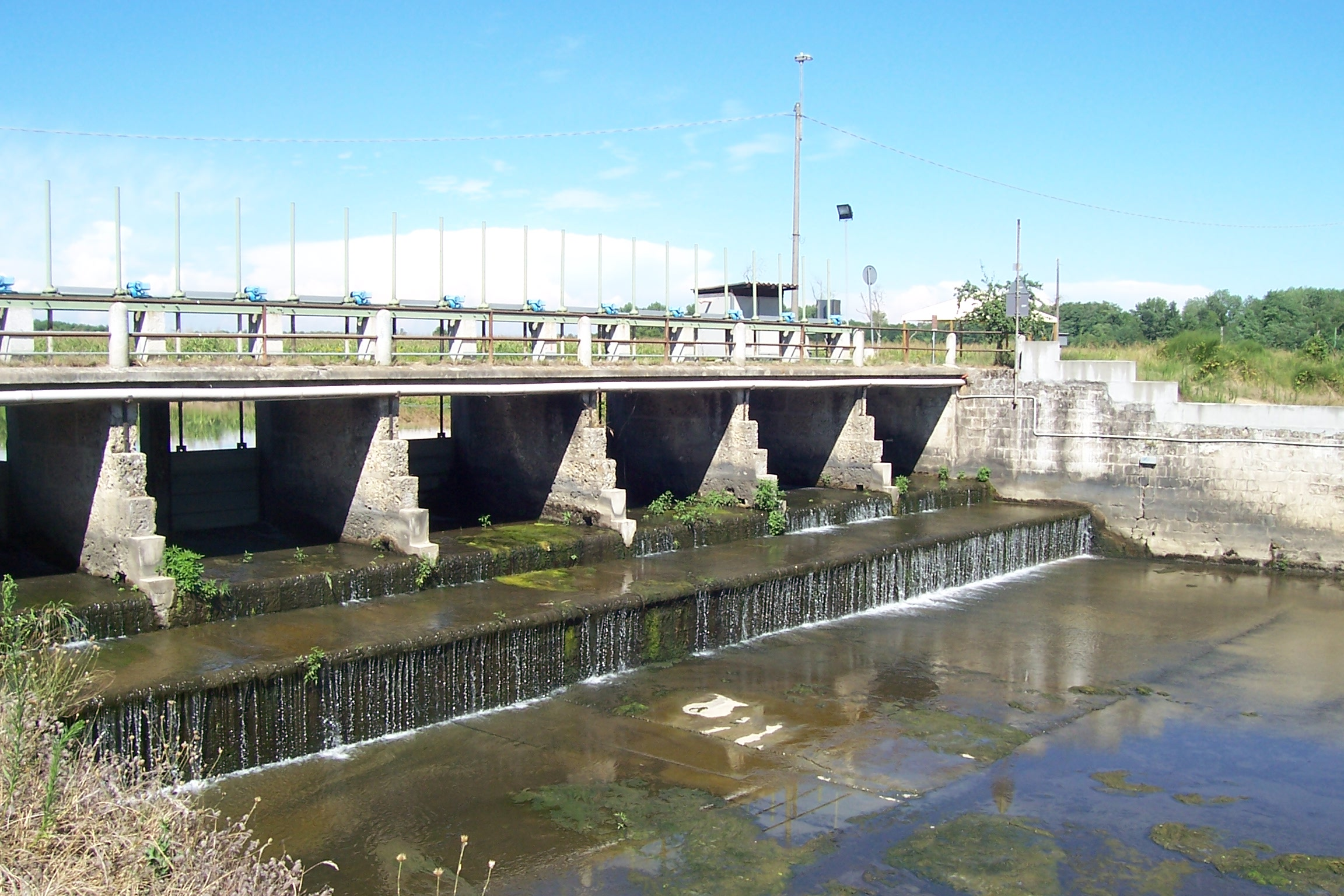

- Location within Italy Location within Lombardy
- Coordinates: 45°8′N 9°23′E
- Country: Italy
- Region: Lombardy
- Province: Province of Pavia (PV)

Government
  - Mayor: Luigi Mario Boschetti

Area
  - Total: 11.82 km^{2} (4.56 sq mi)
- Elevation: 66 m (217 ft)

Population (30 June 2017)
  - Total: 379
  - Density: 32.1/km^{2} (83.0/sq mi)
- Demonym: Costesi
- Time zone: UTC+1 (CET)
  - Summer (DST): UTC+2 (CEST)
- Postal code: 27010
- Dialing code: 0382
- Website: Official website

Costa de' Nobili is a comune (municipality) in the Province of Pavia in the Italian region Lombardy, located about 40 km (25 mi) southeast of Milan and about 20 km (12 mi) southeast of Pavia.

Costa de' Nobili borders the following municipalities: Corteolona e Genzone, Pieve Porto Morone, San Zenone al Po, Santa Cristina e Bissone, Spessa, Torre de' Negri, Zerbo.

The castle complex in the municipality dates back to the thirteenth and fourteenth centuries, and consists of two buildings (one being the ancient Palace, seat of the Town Hall) joined by a central tower.
