= Giovanni Quirici =

Italian composer

Giovanni Quirici (1824–1896) was an Italian composer.

Quirici was born in Arena Po, a small town between Pavia and Piacenza. He died in 1896 in Turin. Unknown in biographic dictionaries, only some of his life details are known through Prospero Succio, keeper of the musical archives of the cathedral of Turin, who probably knew the composer personally. Succio writes that G. Quirici's parents wanted him to become a notary public, but he elected to study music at the age of 14. He studied music theory in Milan with Boniforti, Manusardi and Padre Moro. He arrived in Turin about 1878, where he was a composition teacher and probably an organist in an unknown place.

Quirici was prolific: not only light pieces, romances and dances for piano but a big amount of vocal and organ religious music He is published by Perosino, Borriero, Blanchi, Bibliografia Salesiana in Turin. In Milan, besides Ricordi, Mariani, Carisch, his main publisher is Martinenghi. His catalog contains no less than 15 Masses for organ solo, in addition to series of verses and vocal pieces. Two of these Masses, in G and in C have been re-edited by Carrara and Armelin publishers, and are often performed and recorded.
