= Rottofreno =

- Comune
- Comune di Rottofreno
- Location within Italy Location within Emilia-Romagna
- Coordinates: 45°3′N 9°33′E
- Country: Italy
- Region: Emilia-Romagna
- Province: Piacenza (PC)
- Frazioni: San Nicolò a Trebbia, Santimento, Centora

Government
  - Mayor: Paola Galvani (Lista Civica)

Area
  - Total: 34.5 km^{2} (13.3 sq mi)
- Elevation: 65 m (213 ft)

Population (12 May 2024)
  - Total: 12,298
  - Density: 356/km^{2} (923/sq mi)
- Time zone: UTC+1 (CET)
  - Summer (DST): UTC+2 (CEST)
- Postal code: 29010
- Dialing code: 0523
- Website: Official website

Rottofreno (Piacentino: Altufrèi, Artufrèi, Ltufrèi or Rtufrèi) is a comune (municipality) in the Province of Piacenza in the Italian region Emilia-Romagna, located about 160 kilometres (99 mi) northwest of Bologna and about 12 kilometres (7 mi) west of Piacenza.

Rottofreno borders the following municipalities: Borgonovo Val Tidone, Calendasco, Chignolo Po, Gragnano Trebbiense, Monticelli Pavese, Piacenza, and Sarmato.

The main settlement of the comune is San Nicolò, which has more inhabitants than Rottofreno proper.

== Name and history ==
According to a legend, the name (meaning "broken bit") derives from an event during the Carthaginian invasion of Italy (218–201 BC), when Hannibal allegedly broke here the bit of his horse. The event is also remembered in the city's coat of arms. In reality the name is from the Lombard roth ("glory") and fridu ("friendship", "safeness"). The village was in fact called Rottofredo during the Middle Ages.

On 10 August 1746, during the War of Austrian Succession, a battle was fought here between a French-Spanish army and an Austrian force. This event is known as the Battle of Rottofredo (or Rottofreddo).

== Main sights ==
- The great Baroque church of St. John the Baptist (1690) in the frazione of Santimento.

== Demographic evolution ==
Historical population

Year	Pop.	±%
1861	3,073	—
1871	3,388	+10.3%
1881	3,395	+0.2%
1901	4,121	+21.4%
1911	4,582	+11.2%

Year	Pop.	±%
1921	4,968	+8.4%
1931	5,243	+5.5%
1936	5,346	+2.0%
1951	5,638	+5.5%
1961	5,786	+2.6%

Year	Pop.	±%
1971	6,074	+5.0%
1981	6,969	+14.7%
1991	7,835	+12.4%
2001	8,844	+12.9%

Source: Data from ISTAT
