= Sigismondo II d'Este =

- 1st Marquess of Borgomanero and Porlezza; Lord of San Martino

Marquess of Borgomanero and Porlezza
- Reign: 1552 – 1561
- Predecessor: Title created
- Successor: Filippo I d'Este

Lord of San Martino
- Reign: 1523 – 1561
- Predecessor: Ercole d'Este
- Successor: Filippo I d'Este
- Born: 1493
- Died: 1561 (aged 67–68); Pavia, Duchy of Milan
- Spouse: Giustina Trivulzio (m. 1533)
- Issue Detail: Sigismonda d'Este; Renata d'Este; Filippo; Matilde d'Este; Filiberto d'Este; Barbara d'Este
- House: Este di San Martino
- Father: Ercole d'Este
- Mother: Angela Sforza
- Religion: Roman Catholicism

Sigismondo II d'Este (c. 1493 – c. 1561) was an Italian nobleman who served as Lord of San Martino and 1st Marquess of Borgomanero and Porlezza.

== Biography ==
Sigismondo was born in 1493 to Ercole d'Este and Angela Sforza.

He inherited his father's fiefdoms in 1523. In 1527, by concession of Sigismondo, some companies of Spanish soldiers camped in the territories of San Martino in Rio.

Sigismondo received a diploma from Emperor Charles V which granted him the use of the noble coat of arms anywhere in the Empire.

On 25 May 1551, with a diploma issued by Emperor Charles V, the privilege granted by the Duke of Milan on 24 December 1493 to Ercole d'Este was confirmed to Sigismondo II d'Este and to the descendants of the Sigismondo line: "He added the citizens of the cities of Milan, Papia and Lauda to the number of citizens of the cities preachers, just as if they were merely original citizens of those same cities."; (Note: "Cives Civitatum Mediolani, Papiae et Laudae, et numero Civium praedicatorum Civitatum aggregavit non secus, ac si mere originarii Cives earundem Civitatum essent") with this conferment the citizenship of Milan, Pavia and Lodi was confirmed, which effectively brought the dynasty of the cadet branch of the Este of San Martino to be a Lombard family.

Between 1556 and 1557, following the hospitality granted by Sigismondo to a Spanish garrison in the territory of San Martino in Rio, the Duke of Ferrara Alfonso II deprived him of the fiefdom, exiling him. The Emperor Charles V intervened in favour of his friend Sigismondo, giving the order to the imperial garrison stationed in Correggio to occupy the territories of San Martino and in fact forcing the Duke to retrace his steps. In 1558 Sigismondo was allowed to return and take possession of his territories.

Sigismondo held the office of governor of Pavia, where he died in 1561.

== Marriage and issue ==
In 1533 Sigismondo married Giustina Trivulzio; thanks to this marriage he inherited the marquisates of Borgomanero and Porlezza from his father-in-law by imperial investiture. The couple had six children:

- Sigismonda (1534 – after 1590), married in 1556 Paolo Sfondrati (1538 - 23 April 1587), Count of the Riviera and brother of Pope Gregory XIV;
- Renata (born 1536), nun in Reggio;
- Filippo (1537 – 1592), 1st Marquis of San Martino in Rio, 2nd Marquis of Borgomanero and Porlezza , 1st Marquis of Lanzo , 3rd Count of Corteolona, Lord of Campogalliano and Castellarano. Lord of the Vicariate of Belgioioso;
- Filiberto (1540 – 1550);
- Matilde (born 1545), nun in Reggio;
- Barbara (1553 – 1596), married Francesco Trivulzio di Melzo (†1578).
