= San Zenone al Po =

- Comune
- Comune di San Zenone al Po
- Location within Italy Location within Lombardy
- Coordinates: 45°4′N 9°21′E
- Country: Italy
- Region: Lombardy
- Province: Pavia (PV)

Area
  - Total: 6 km^{2} (2.3 sq mi)
- Elevation: 59 m (194 ft)

Population (2018-01-01)
  - Total: 518
  - Density: 86/km^{2} (220/sq mi)
- Demonym: Sanzenonesi
- Time zone: UTC+1 (CET)
  - Summer (DST): UTC+2 (CEST)
- Postal code: 27010
- Dialing code: 0382
- Website: Official website

San Zenone al Po is a comune in the province of Pavia, Lombardy, Italy.
