= Pavese (territory) =

- Territory of the Province of Pavia
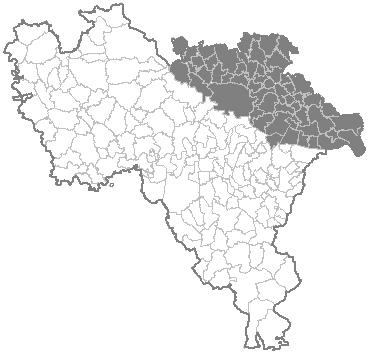
- The Pavese within the Province of Pavia

- Location of the Pavese in Italy
- Coordinates: 45°11′07″N 9°09′18″E
- Country: Italy
- Region: Lombardy
- Province: Pavia (PV)
- Seat: Pavia
- Comuni: 52

Area
  - Total: 650 km^{2} (250 sq mi)

Population (2011)
  - Total: 189,394
  - Density: 290/km^{2} (750/sq mi)
- Time zone: UTC+1 (CET)
  - Summer (DST): UTC+2 (CEST)

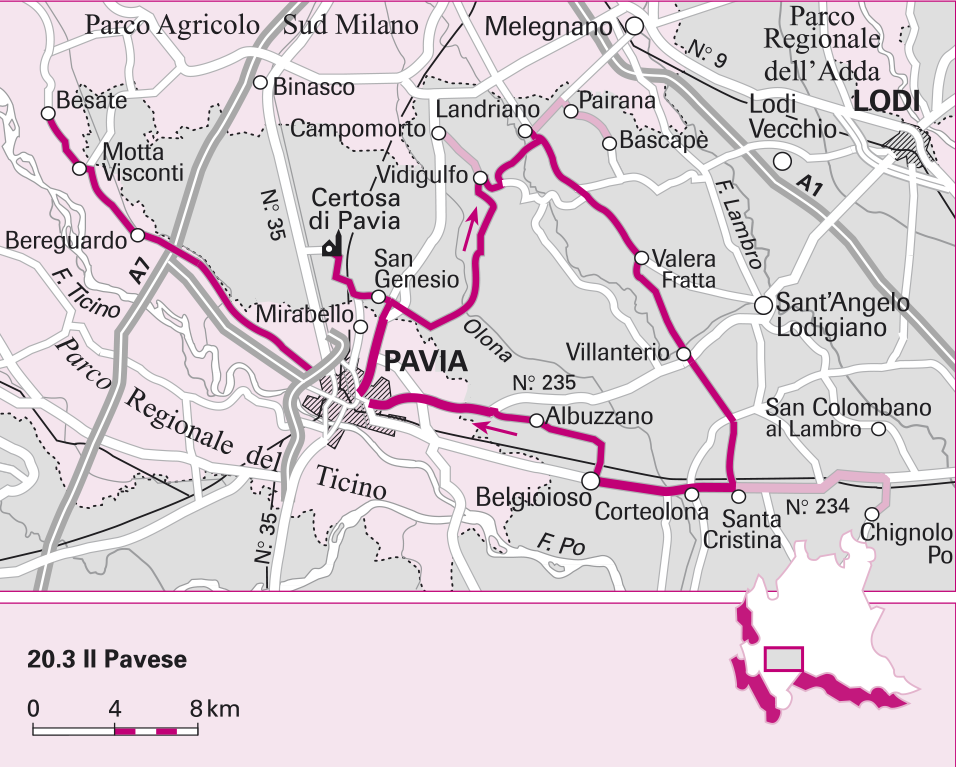
Map of the area

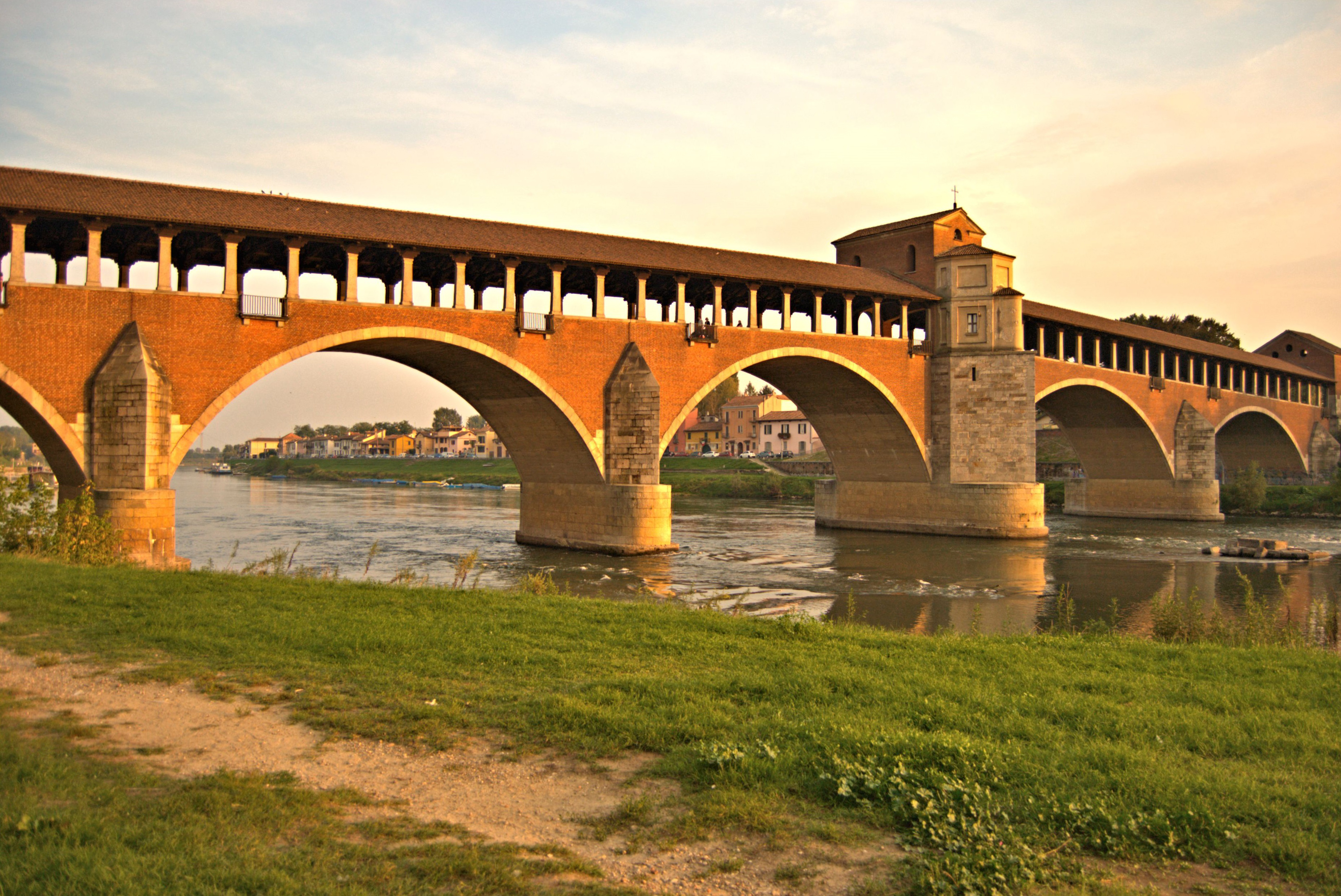
The Covered Bridge of Pavia on the Ticino River

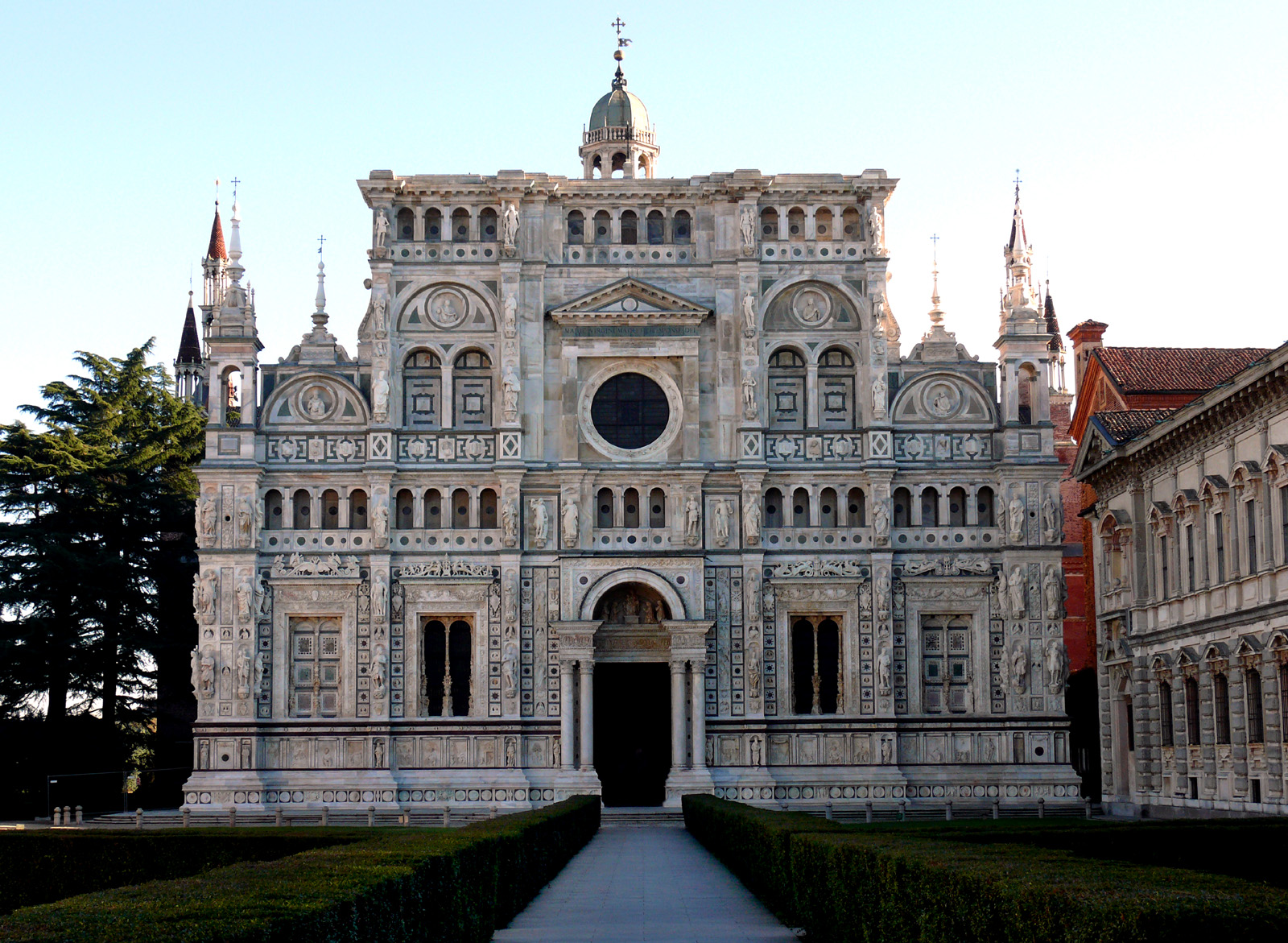
the Certosa di Pavia Monastery

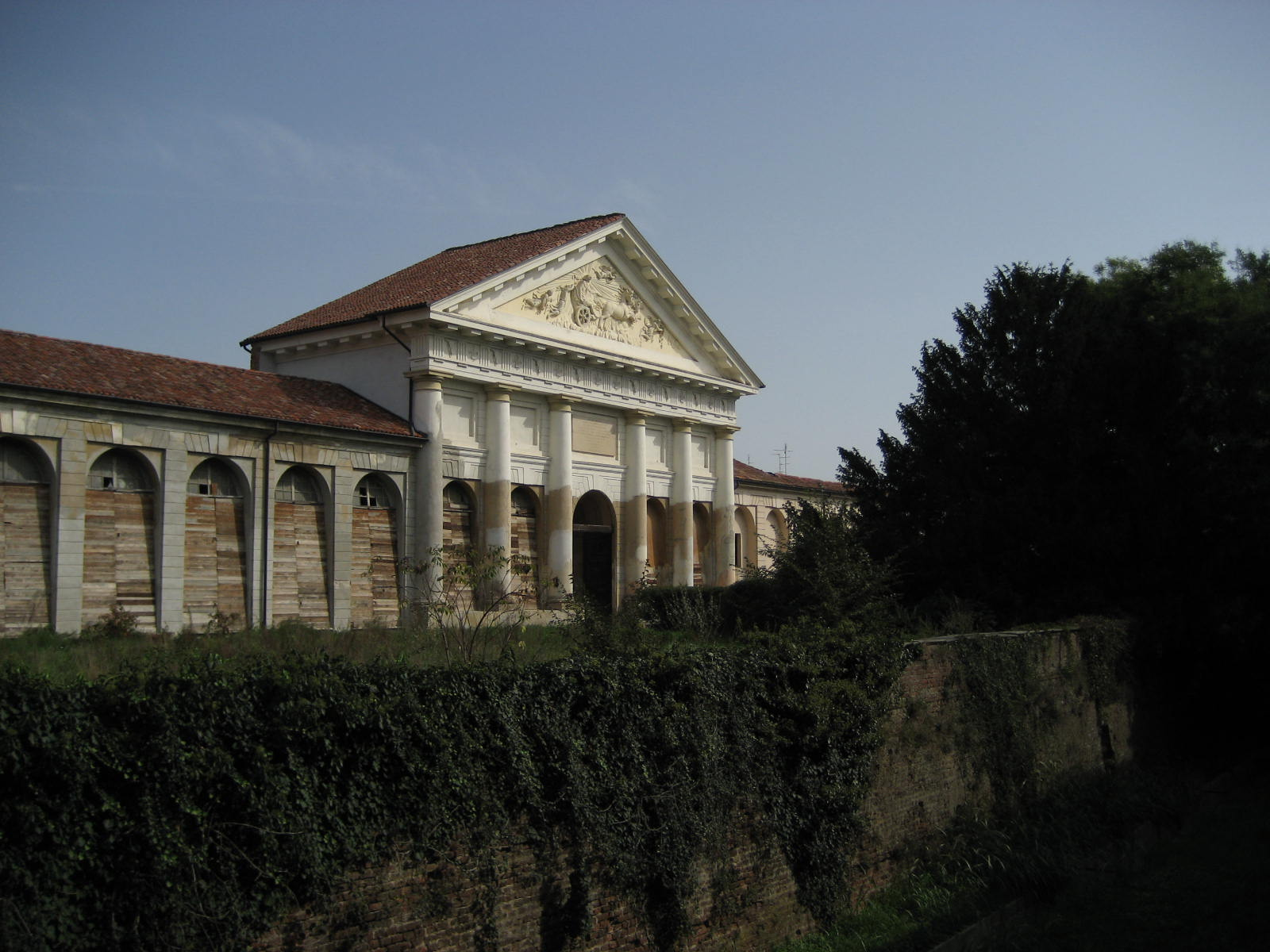
The greenhouse of Belgioioso Castle, projected by Leopoldo Pollack

The Pavese (Western Lombard: Paves) is a geographical and historical area in the Pianura Padana (Po Rivers's valley) of northern Italy, located in south-western Lombardy. It constitutes one of the 3 territories in which is divided the Province of Pavia.

== Geography ==
=== Overview ===
The territory is located in the northwestern area of the province and borders with the provinces of Milan, Lodi and Piacenza (in Emilia-Romagna). It is crossed at its southern borders by the river Po and in the east by Ticino, which separates it from the Lomellina and the Oltrepò Pavese. The territory is flat, except from some hills, and is crossed by the rivers Olona, Southern Lambro, Naviglio Pavese, Naviglio di Bereguardo and several acequias.

=== Municipalities ===
The territory is divided traditionally in the city of Pavia and the areas of Campagna Soprana (i.e. "Upper Rural Area") and Campagna Sottana (i.e. "Lower Rural Area").

City of Pavia

- Pavia

Campagna Soprana

- Battuda
- Bereguardo
- Borgarello
- Bornasco
- Casorate Primo
- Certosa di Pavia
- Giussago
- Marcignago
- Rognano
- San Genesio ed Uniti
- Torre d'Isola
- Trivolzio
- Trovo
- Vellezzo Bellini
- Zeccone
- Mirabello (frazione of Pavia)

Campagna Sottana

- Albuzzano
- Badia Pavese
- Bascapè
- Belgioioso
- Ceranova
- Chignolo Po
- Copiano
- Corteolona e Genzone
- Costa de' Nobili
- Cura Carpignano
- Filighera
- Gerenzago
- Inverno e Monteleone
- Landriano
- Lardirago
- Linarolo
- Magherno
- Marzano
- Miradolo Terme
- Monticelli Pavese
- Pieve Porto Morone
- Roncaro
- San Zenone al Po
- Sant'Alessio con Vialone
- Santa Cristina e Bissone
- Siziano
- Spessa
- Torre d'Arese
- Torre de' Negri
- Torrevecchia Pia
- Valle Salimbene
- Vidigulfo
- Villanterio
- Vistarino
- Zerbo
- Ca' della Terra (frazione of Pavia)
- Fossarmato (frazione of Pavia)

== See also ==
- Province of Pavia
- Lomellina
- Oltrepò Pavese
