= Principality of Pavia =

Historic part of the Duchy of Milan

Principality of Pavia (Principato di Pavia)
- Principality of Duchy of Milan; Kingdom of Spain (from 1535)
- 1499–1786
- Flag Coat of arms

- Historical territories of the Principality of Pavia
- Capital: Pavia
- Legislature: General Congregation
- History
  - The Holy Roman Emperor elevates the county to Principality: 1499
  - Subdivision of Austrian Lombardy into provinces: 1786
Preceded by	Succeeded by
County of Pavia	Province of Pavia (Austrian Lombardy)

The Principality of Pavia (Lombard: Principaa de Pavia, Italian: Principato di Pavia) was an historic division of Lombardy and of the Duchy of Milan, which was ranked as a principality as an honor to the reigning House of Milan. It was the predecessor of the present-day Province of Pavia.

== History ==
In the Roman age, the territory of the municipium of Ticinum (ancient Pavia) did not extend south of the Po and included both the Pavese and much of present-day Lomellina, boundaries that were later adopted, at least from the Early Middle Ages, by the Diocese of Pavia. Presumably, around the 8th century, some communities of the Oltrepò, such as Arena Po, Montù Beccaria, Montalto Pavese, Mornico Losana and Portalbera, became part of the district of Pavia, then capital of the Kingdom of the Lombards. Moreover, between the 8th and 11th centuries, several important ecclesiastical institutions of Pavia of royal foundation, such as the monasteries of San Pietro in Ciel d'Oro, Santa Maria Teodote and San Felice, expanded their possessions in the Oltrepò, thus encouraging Pavia's expansion south of the Po.

In the Carolingian age the territory of Pavia was divided between the County of Pavia, capital of the Kingdom of Italy, and the County of Lomello, later reunited in the 10th century. In the 12th century Pavia, which remained firmly Ghibelline, obtained, thanks to a diploma issued by Emperor Frederick I on 8 August 1164, control over much of the present-day Oltrepò and further territorial expansions in the Pavese and in Lomellina. Subsequent diplomas granted by Emperors Henry VI in 1191 and Frederick II in 1219, 1220 and 1232 extended the area controlled by Pavia to new localities in the hilly belt, in Lomellina and in the plain between Pavia and Milan, while other settlements, such as Robbio, were conquered by the people of Pavia in 1202 during a war against Vercelli.

Pavia (in the 14th century ruled by the Beccaria family) was for a long time the object of Visconti ambitions, and under Galeazzo II Visconti the attacks became particularly determined; after a failed siege in 1356, the city finally fell with a second siege in 1359.

The importance and prestige of the urban center (the city of Pavia), ancient capital of the Kingdom of the Lombards and of the Kingdom of Italy, meant that after the conquest Galeazzo II Visconti decided to transfer his residence and court from Milan to Pavia, to the Visconti Castle. Subsequently, his son Gian Galeazzo Visconti, who continued to reside in Pavia, in 1395 obtained from Emperor Wenceslaus the title of Duke of Milan, followed, in 1396, by a second diploma legitimizing a system of succession based on male primogeniture and raising Pavia to a County, thus granting the heir to the throne the title of Count of Pavia. The same diploma also described the coat of arms of the new county: a party shield with the Visconti biscione on the left and three superimposed imperial eagles on the right. In the same year, echoing early medieval royal coronations, Gian Galeazzo had himself enthroned as Count of Pavia in the San Michele Maggiore basilica. The dual seat of the court between Milan and Pavia gave the latter a distinct role and a strong and prestigious identity within the dominion and in comparison with the other cities, to the detriment of Milanese centrality.

The area was originally the County of Pavia, under the direct rule of the Duke of Milan. On 12 June 1499, the county, having passed with Milan to the House of Sforza, was elevated to the rank of principality (Fürst) by the Emperor Maximilian I. This placed Pavia in second position after the Milanese among the Sforza provinces.

In 1786 the Austrian government of the Duchy decided to transform the Principality into the province of Pavia.

During the Napoleonic period (1797–1814) the unity of the territory of Pavia was not restored. It is significant that, when the inhabitants of the Oltrepò were asked in a referendum to which territory they wished to be united, and they replied that they wanted to return to Pavia, their will was simply ignored by the French government. The division therefore continued: Pavia with the Campagne was annexed to the Department of Olona, the Lomellina and the Siccomario to the Department of Agogna, which were part of the Italian Republic and the Kingdom of Italy; the Oltrepò, first attached to the Department of Marengo (Alessandria) and then to the Department of Genoa, was part of the French Republic and later the French Empire. The boundaries were adjusted and made to coincide with natural lines (in particular, the Po became a state border: thus the Oltrepò lost Mezzana Bigli but gained Bastida Pancarana).

== Division ==
The Principality of Pavia was divided in 1565 into four districts, each with a sindaco (mayor) as a head of government. They were Oltrepò, Lomellina, Upper County and Lower County. The sindaco of the Oltrepò had more power because of the insulated nature of its territory. Every district was made up of communes, which had power over the local police and had some autonomy on the justice. They also each had an elected treasurer and assembly. In the important communities there was a Podestà, nominated by central authorities.

In the mid-1700s there were 146 communes, including farmhouses, formally included into bigger communes but autonomous in fiscal and administrative ways.

== See also ==
- Province of Pavia (Lombardy–Venetia)
- Province of Pavia
- Roman Catholic Diocese of Pavia

== Bibliography ==
- Storia della Lomellina, e del principato di Pavia dai suoi primi abitatori, sino all'anno 1746. Divisa in due parti, Portalupi, Luigi
- Terra, fiscalità, smembramenti: città e campagna nel Principato di Pavia nei secoli XVI–XVIII, pp. 161–199, Giuseppe Negro, Società Pavese di Storia Patria e della Banca del Monte di Pavia
- Del Principato di Pavia ovvero Thesaurus Ticinensis con le mappe di Pavia, Lomellina, Oltrepò, Pavese e della Certosa di Pavia, 1994
