= Roncaro =

- Comune
- Comune di Roncaro
- Location within Italy Location within Lombardy
- Coordinates: 45°14′N 9°17′E
- Country: Italy
- Region: Lombardy
- Province: Pavia (PV)

Government
  - Mayor: Benedetto D'Amata

Area
  - Total: 5.05 km^{2} (1.95 sq mi)
- Elevation: 81 m (266 ft)

Population (31 December 2010)
  - Total: 1,327
  - Density: 263/km^{2} (681/sq mi)
- Demonym: Roncaresi
- Time zone: UTC+1 (CET)
  - Summer (DST): UTC+2 (CEST)
- Postal code: 27010
- Dialing code: 0382
- Website: Official website

Roncaro is a comune (municipality) in the Province of Pavia in the Italian region Lombardy, located about 30 km (19 mi) southeast of Milan and about 12 km (7.5 mi) northeast of Pavia.

Roncaro borders the following municipalities: Cura Carpignano, Lardirago, Marzano, Sant'Alessio con Vialone, Vistarino.
