= Torrevecchia =

Torrevecchia (meaning "old tower" in Italian) may refer to some places in Italy:

- Torrevecchia Pia, a municipality in the Province of Pavia, Lombardy
- Torrevecchia Teatina, a municipality in the Province of Chieti, Abruzzo
- Torre Vecchia, a coastal tower in the Italian comune of San Vincenzo, Tuscany
