= Agnolotti pavesi =

Italian meat-filled pasta

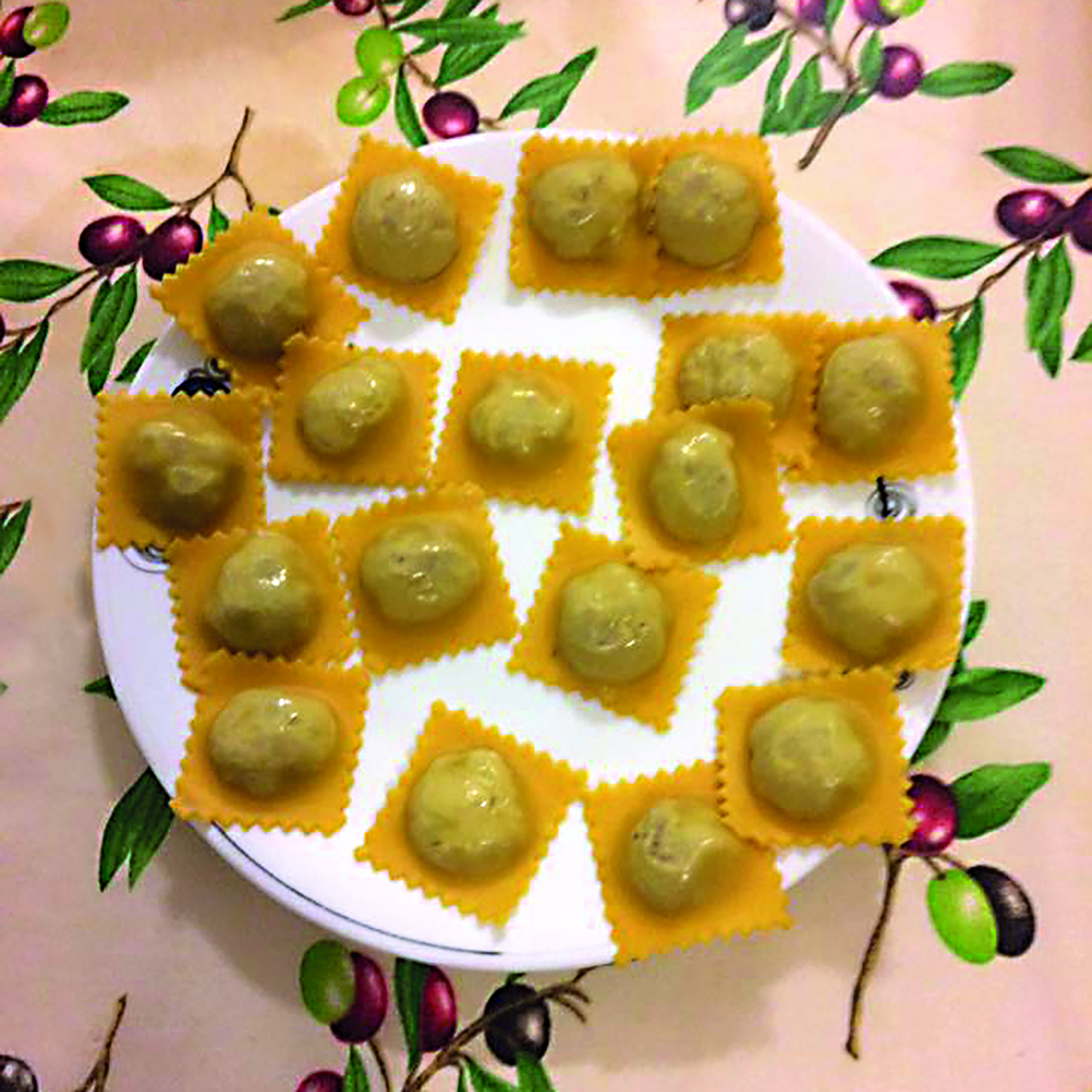
- Homemade agnolotti pavesi
- Alternative names: Agnolot, agnulot (Lombard)
- Type: Pasta
- Place of origin: Italy
- Region or state: Oltrepò Pavese (historical region), Lombardy
- Associated cuisine: Italian (Lombard)
- Serving temperature: Hot or warm
- Main ingredients: Egg-based pasta dough, Pavese stew

Agnolotti pavesi (Italian: [aɲɲoˈlɔtti paˈveːzi, -eːsi]; sg.: agnolotto pavese; Lombard: agnolot or agnulot) is a type of egg-based stuffed pasta served hot or warm, typical of the Oltrepò Pavese, an area of the province of Pavia, in the Lombardy region of Italy. Agnolotti pavesi can be served dry, with a sauce based on Pavese stew, or in goose broth.

== Characteristics ==
The filling of the agnolotti pavesi is based on Pavese stew. The recipe for this stuffed egg-based pasta is characterized by influences from Piedmontese and Piacentino cuisine, characteristics of areas that border the Oltrepò Pavese. The shape of the pasta was based on the Piedmontese agnolotti, and the filling of Pavese stew is based on stracotto alla piacentina, which is the filling for Piacentino anolini. Piedmontese agnolotti, in particular, differ from the agnolotti pavesi due to the filling, which is instead based on roast meat. Agnolotti pavesi is a typical dish of the Christmas tradition, and are consumed during celebrations and important occasions.

== Preparation ==
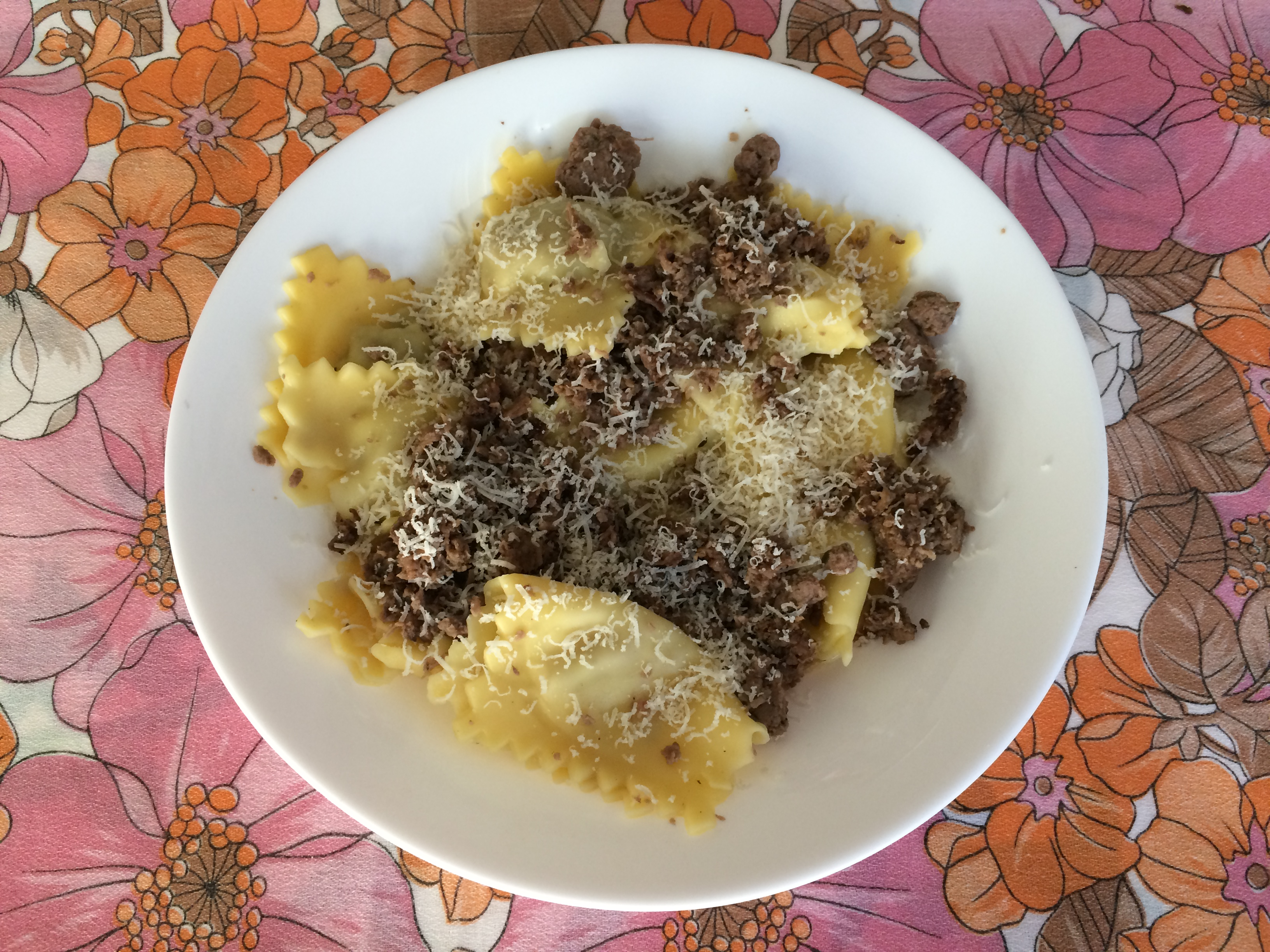
A plate of dry agnolotti pavesi, with a Pavese stew-based sauce

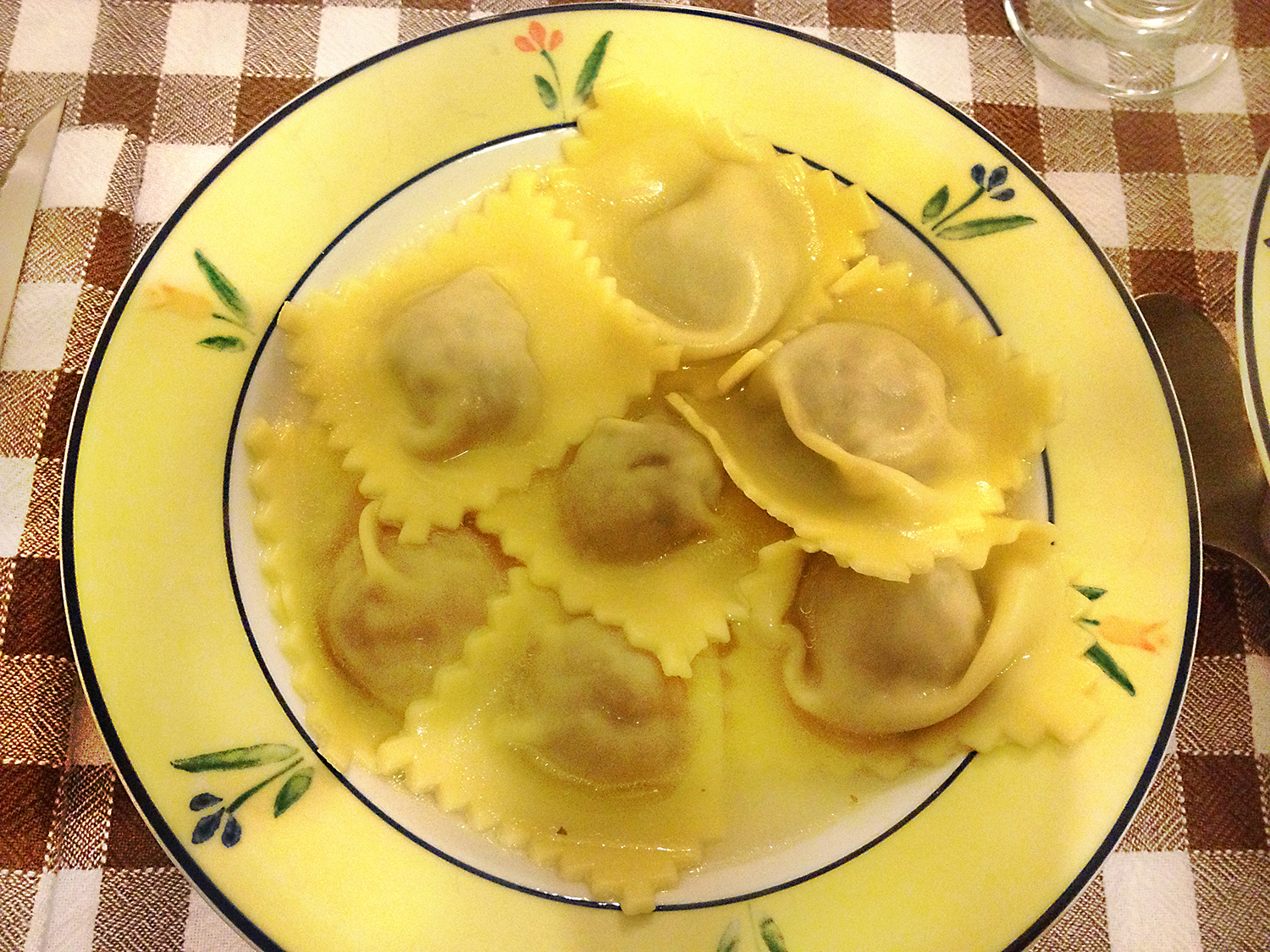
A plate of agnolotti pavesi in goose broth

Agnolotti pavesi are prepared by immersion in boiling water. Agnolotti pavesi can be served dry, with a sauce based on Pavese stew, or in goose broth. In both cases they may be topped with Parmesan cheese, but no cheese is contained within agnolotti pavesi.

== Popular culture ==
The agnolotto pavese which achieved the world record for its weight (148 kilograms or 326 pounds) was made in Fortunago in 2015. A charity competition, called Palio dell'Agnolotto, is organized in the Oltrepò Pavese, where local restaurants and agritourisms compete in the preparation of the agnolotti pavesi with the aim of winning the event after judges vote, which rewards the three best agnolotti pavesi and awards the special prize for the best plating.

== See also ==
- Lombard cuisine
- List of pasta
- List of dumplings
