= Certosa di Pavia, Lombardy =

Certosa di Pavia
- Comune
- Comune di Certosa di Pavia
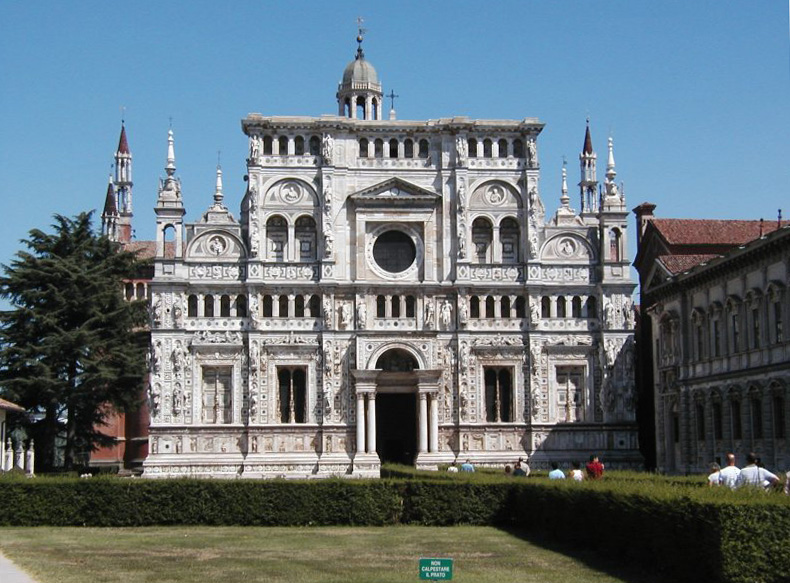
- The facade of the Certosa di Pavia Monastery

- Coat of arms

- Certosa di Pavia within the Province of Pavia

- Location within Italy Location within Lombardy
- Coordinates: 45°15′N 09°09′E
- Country: Italy
- Region: Lombardy
- Province: Pavia (PV)
- Frazioni: Cascine Calderari, Samperone, Torre del Mangano (municipal seat), Torriano

Government
  - Mayor: Corrado Petrini (since 8-6-2009)

Area
  - Total: 10 km^{2} (3.9 sq mi)
- Elevation: 90 m (300 ft)

Population (January 31, 2013)
  - Total: 5,114
  - Density: 510/km^{2} (1,300/sq mi)
- Time zone: UTC+1 (CET)
  - Summer (DST): UTC+2 (CEST)
- Postal code: 27100
- Dialing code: 0382
- Website: Official website

Certosa di Pavia (Pavese dialect: Certusa dè Pavia or la Certùsa) is a town and comune (municipality) in the province of Pavia, Lombardy, Italy. It is named after the Certosa di Pavia, a large monastery around which the town grew up. As of 2013 its population was 5,114.

== History ==
The comune was created in 1929 by the former communes of Torre del Mangano, Torriano and Borgarello (which again became autonomous in 1958).

== Geography ==
The municipality is located north of Pavia and 30 km (19 mi) south of Milan. It borders the municipalities of Borgarello, Giussago, Marcignago, Pavia and Vellezzo Bellini. Its territory is formed by the hamlets (frazioni) of Cascine Calderari, Samperone, Torre del Mangano (municipal seat) and Torriano.

== Gallery ==
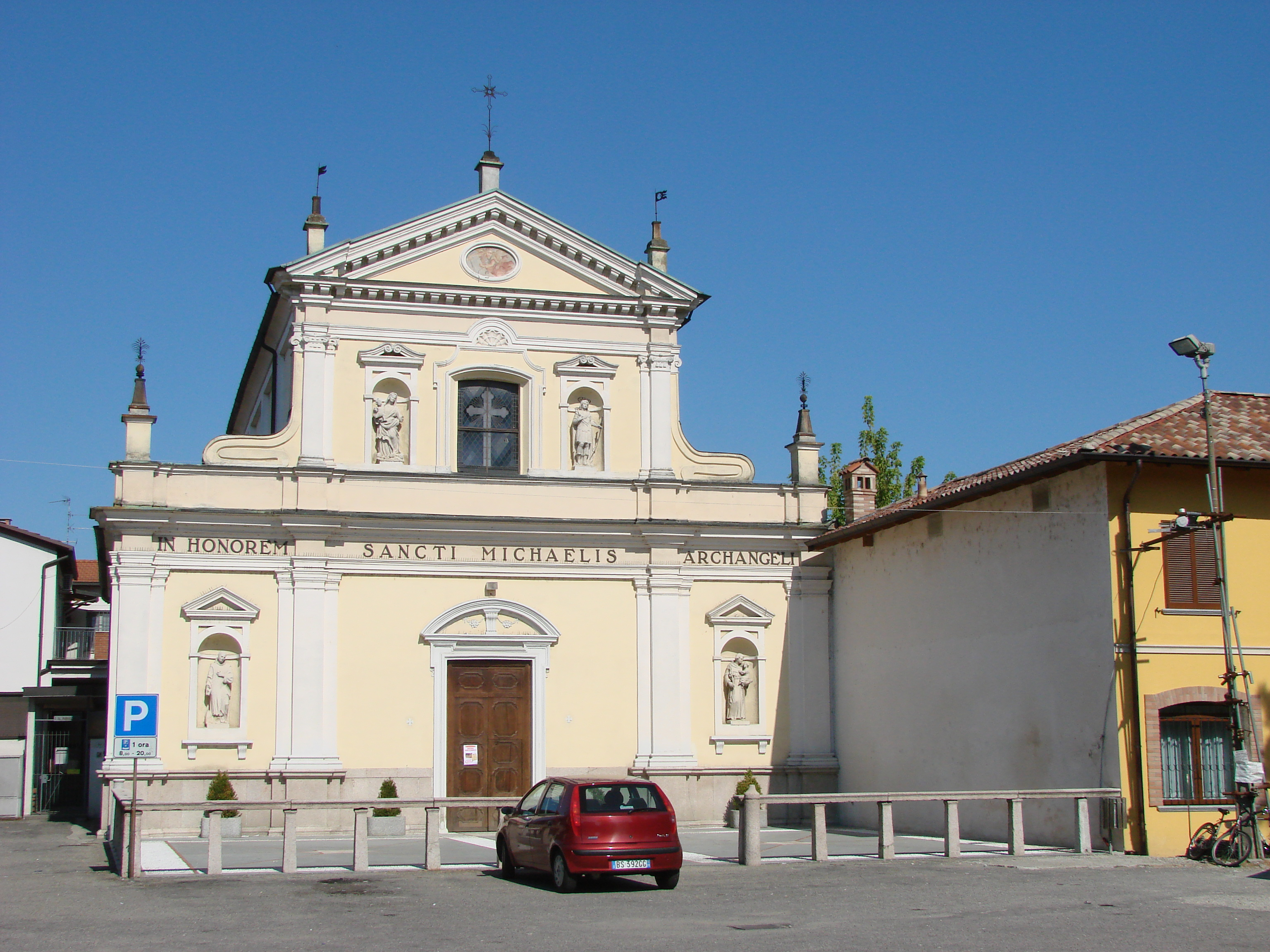
St. Michael's church in Torre del Mangano

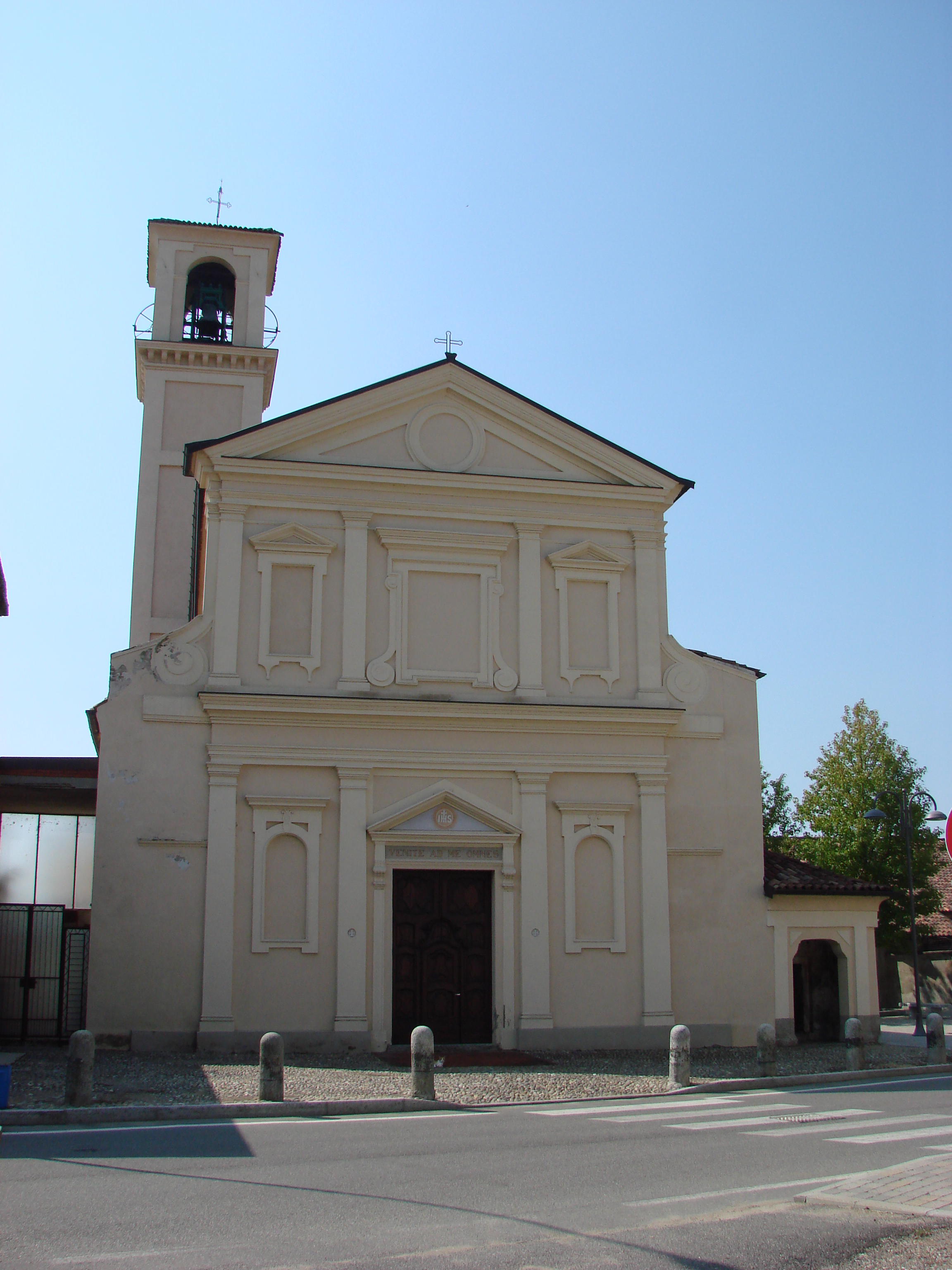
St. Apollinare's church in Torriano

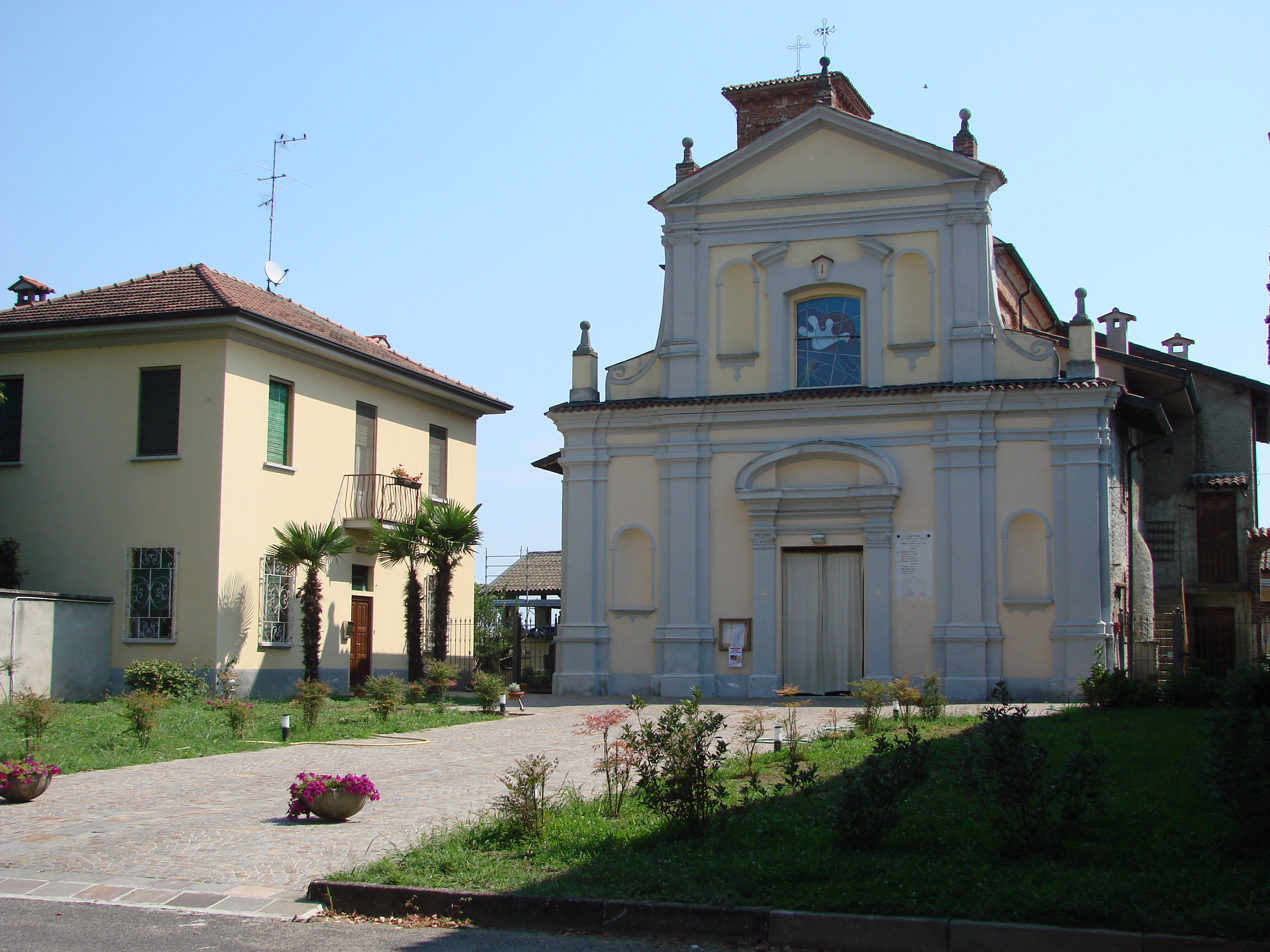
St. Brizio's church in Samperone

== See also ==
- Certosa di Pavia Monastery
- Certosa di Pavia railway station
