= Oltrepò Pavese =

Oltrepò Pavese Ultrepò Paves (Lombard)
- Territory of the province of Pavia
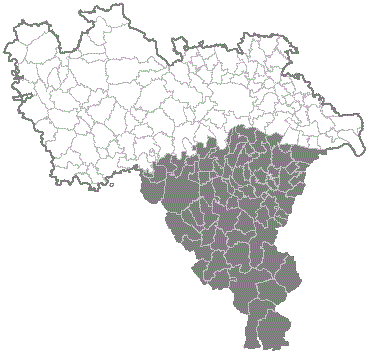
- The Oltrepò within the province of Pavia

- Location of the Oltrepò Pavese in Italy
- Coordinates: 44°59′33″N 9°0′33″E
- Country: Italy
- Region: Lombardy
- Province: Pavia (PV)
- Seat: Voghera
- Comuni: 78

Area
  - Total: 1,097 km^{2} (424 sq mi)

Population (2011)
  - Total: 146,579
  - Density: 133.6/km^{2} (346.1/sq mi)
- Time zone: UTC+01:00 (CET)
  - Summer (DST): UTC+02:00 (CEST)
- Website: Official website

The Oltrepò Pavese (Italian: [oltreˈpɔ ppaˈveːze, -eːse]; Western Lombard: Ultrepò Paves; lit. 'Pavia's Beyond-Po') is a historical region making up the southern portion of the province of Pavia, in the northwest Italian region of Lombardy. The area is named after its location south of the River Po as considered from the provincial capital Pavia and in general from the rest of Lombardy.

== Geography ==
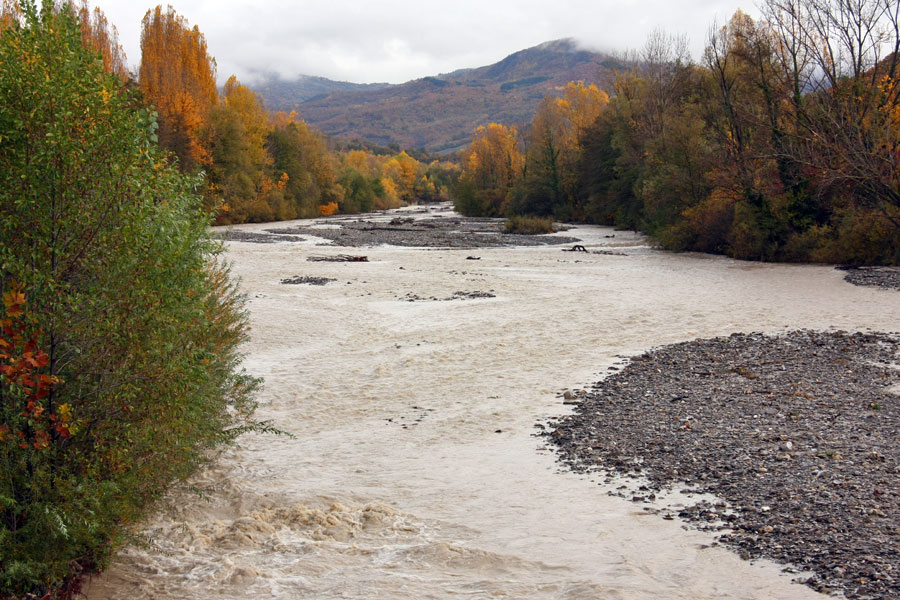
River Staffora

Extending over an area of c. 1,100 km^{2} (420 sq mi), it is roughly triangular in shape, with a base to the north formed by the Po and a southern apex at Monte Lesima (1,724 m (5,656 ft)), a mountain of the Ligurian Apennines which is the highest point in the province.

To the west it is bounded by the province of Alessandria and to the east by the province of Piacenza. The territory comprises a plain close to the Po, a hilly section, which rises from the Valle Staffora to the west and from the upper Val Tidone to the east, and a mountainous zone which in addition to Monte Lesima includes the peaks of Monte Chiappo (1700 m) Cima Colletta (1494 m) and Monte Penice (1460 m). The main watercourse is the Staffora; other streams include the Ardivestra, the Versa and the upper part of the Tidone, including part of the Lago di Trebecco reservoir.

The principal settlements are Voghera, Casteggio, Broni, Stradella, Santa Maria della Versa, Salice Terme and Varzi.

== History ==
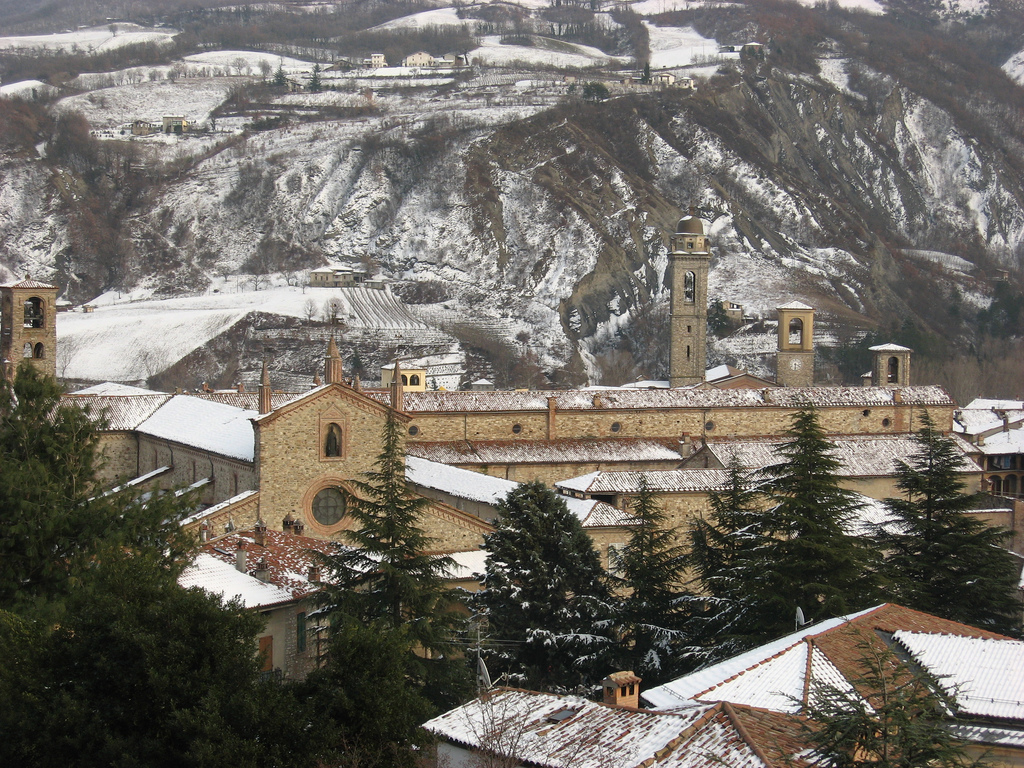
Bobbio Abbey

In Roman times, the current territory of Oltrepò Pavese was not controlled by the Ticinum (Pavia) but was subject to the Roman cities of Piacenza and Tortona. From the Lombard age, Pavia, then capital of the kingdom, began to extend its area of influence to the south of the River Po. In these centuries it was divided between the Bobbio Abbey, Pavia, some important monasteries of Pavia, such as San Pietro in Ciel d'Oro, Santa Maria Teodote and San Felice and the Marquises Malaspina. Starting from the 11th century, some monasteries in Pavia, such as San Pietro in Ciel d'Oro, which at least since 974 owned vineyards and winepresses in San Damiano al Colle, spread the cultivation of vines in the area. Thanks to the Po and Ticino, the wine was brought to Pavia, where the part not consumed by the monks was then traded. The current borders of Oltrepò Pavese date back to 1164, when the emperor Frederick I donated the entire territory to the city of Pavia, his ally against the Lombard League. In 1359, Oltrepò fell, like Pavia, under the control of the Visconti. Later the territory followed the same fate of the Duchy of Milan, until 1743, when it was annexed to the Kingdom of Sardinia. Since 1859 Oltrepò Pavese is part of the province of Pavia and Lombardy.

== Tourism ==
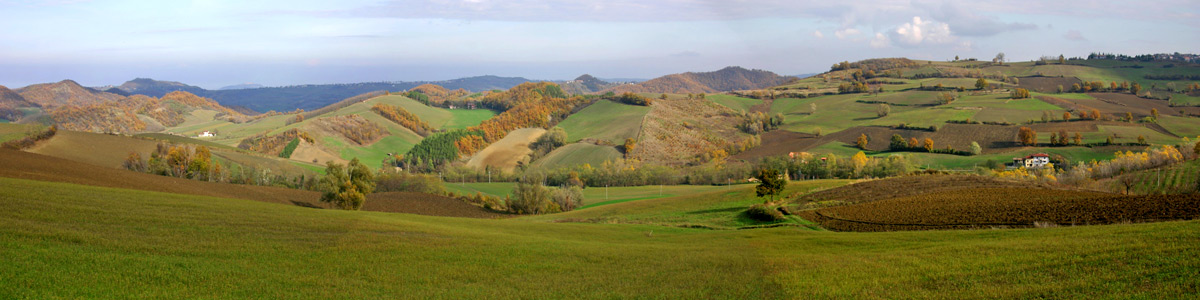
View of the Oltrepò Pavese near Val di Nizza

Although occasionally referred to as "the Tuscany of the north of Italy", Oltrepò Pavese is relatively unknown abroad.

The area offers several attractions: rolling hills, medieval villages and castles, panoramic views, authentic Italian food and local wines. Oltrepò also happens to be the largest wine-producing area of Lombardy (and one of the largest in Italy), specializing in Pinot nero. The landscape is scattered with vineyards that are freely accessible to hikers and mountain bikers.

== Gastronomy ==
A well-known speciality of area are the local sparkling wines, whose various levels of carbonation are categorized into three levels: vivace, frizzante and spumante. Both reds and whites can be sparkling to various degrees, and can be made in either a dry or sweeter style. The most famous local wine, the Bonarda, is fruity but not sweet, in contrast to Lambrusco, a red sparkling wine which often has higher residual sugar levels. A local, more 'classical' wine is the Buttafuoco, the production of which is restricted to a small area in the north of the Oltrepò. A typical sweet red wine of the area is the Sangue di Giuda. A handful of regional spumanti—often made in the metodo classico, which is used for Champagne—have been vinted to a standard that qualifies them for DOCG categorization.

Regional dishes use the seasonal ingredients such as mushrooms and truffles, the local meats of rabbit, wild boar etc. One of typical dishes is the Sunday's lunch in which all of the servings of the Italian menu (antipasti, primi, secondi, contorni, dolci) pass by, sometimes even twice. The Oltrepò region is also recognized for its cured meats, such as coppa, and even has salame di Varzi, which is a protected product.

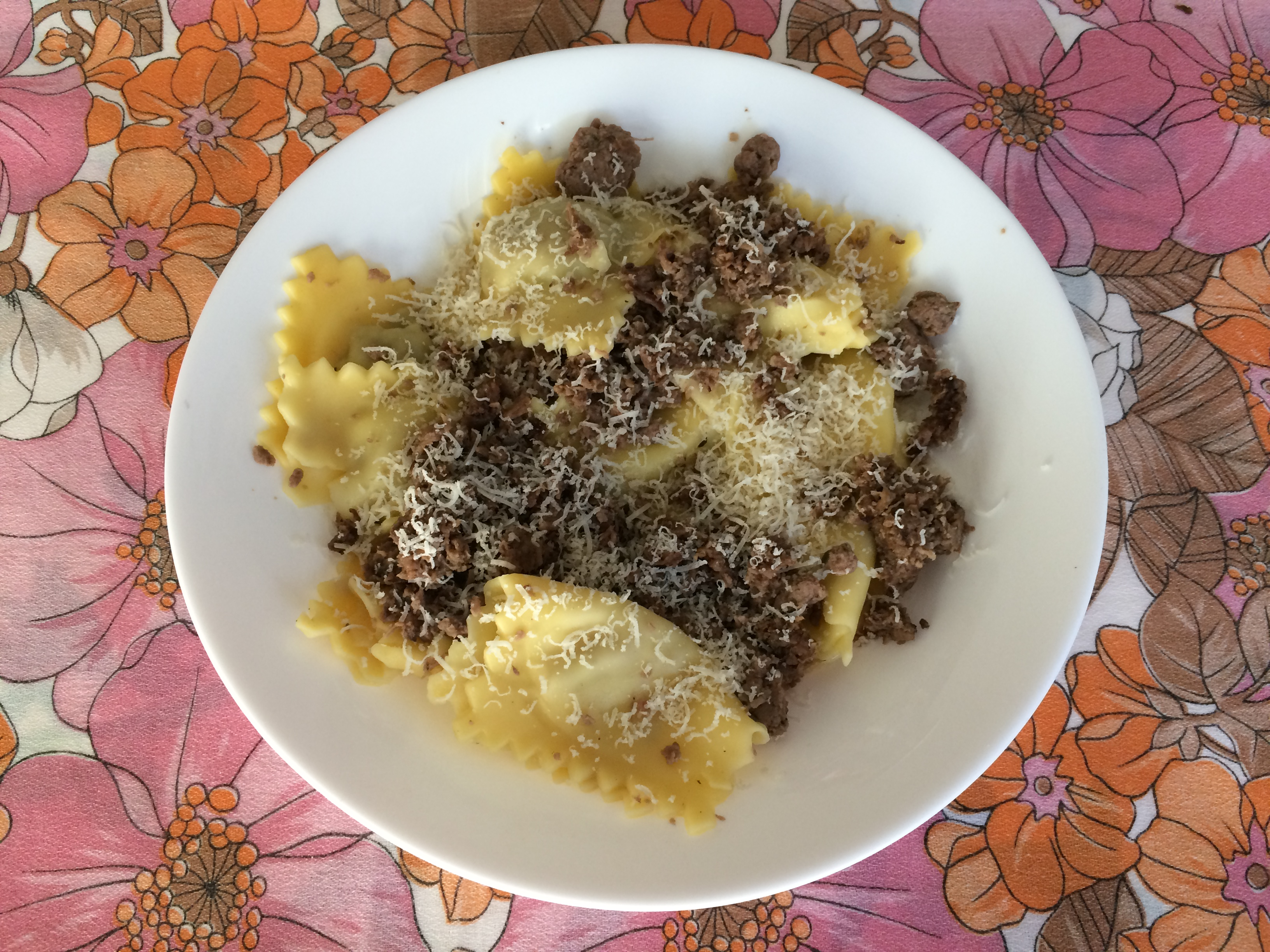
A plate of dry agnolotti pavesi, a type of stuffed pasta, with a Pavese stew-based sauce

Belonging to the Oltrepò Pavese are agnolotti pavesi, a type of stuffed pasta. The filling of the agnolotti pavesi is based on Pavese stew. The recipe for this stuffed pasta is characterized by influences from Piedmontese and Piacentino cuisine, characteristics of areas that border the Oltrepò Pavese. The shape of the pasta was based on the Piedmontese agnolotti, and the filling of Pavese stew is based on stracotto alla piacentina, which is the filling for Piacentino anolini. Piedmontese agnolotti, in particular, differ from the agnolotti pavesi due to the filling, which is instead based on roast meat. Agnolotti pavesi is a typical dish of the Christmas tradition, and are consumed during celebrations and important occasions.

== See also ==
- Province of Pavia
- Pavese
