= San Genesio ed Uniti =

- Comune
- Comune di San Genesio ed Uniti
- Location within Italy Location within Lombardy
- Coordinates: 45°16′N 9°13′E
- Country: Italy
- Region: Lombardy
- Province: Province of Pavia (PV)

Area
  - Total: 9.0 km^{2} (3.5 sq mi)

Population (Dec. 2004)
  - Total: 3,567
  - Density: 400/km^{2} (1,000/sq mi)
- Time zone: UTC+1 (CET)
  - Summer (DST): UTC+2 (CEST)
- Postal code: 27010
- Dialing code: 0382

San Genesio ed Uniti is a comune (municipality) in the Province of Pavia in the Italian region Lombardy, located about 25 km (16 mi) south of Milan and about 11 km (6.8 mi) northeast of Pavia. As of 31 December 2004, it had a population of 3,567 and an area of 9.0 km^{2} (3.5 sq mi).

San Genesio ed Uniti borders the following municipalities: Borgarello, Bornasco, Giussago, Pavia, Sant'Alessio con Vialone, Zeccone.

== History ==
San Genesio is mentioned in the 12th century as Sanctus Genexius. It was the seat of a parish church (pieve) of the diocese of Pavia. Under Gian Galeazzo Visconti the territory of San Genesio was included in the vast Visconti Park, extending between the castle of Pavia and the Certosa and included in a wall delimiting its perimeter. The wall was interrupted at certain locations by gates (porte) from which are derived the names of Porta Pescarina and Due Porte, two of hamlets included in San Genesio ed Uniti territory. following the fall of the Sforza the park was neglected and decayed, although its area was still identified as administrative district (Parco Nuovo). Until the 18th century San Genesio was a fief of the Certosa abbey.

In the territory of San Genesio was fought the Battle of Pavia of 1525 between the kingdom of France and the Holy Roman Empire.

In 1871 the municipalities of Comairano and Ponte Carate were aggregated to San Genesio that became San Genesio ed Uniti.

In 1939 the bordering municipality of Mirabello was suppressed and its territory was divided between the municipality of Pavia and San Genesio ed Uniti.

== Demographic evolution ==
Historical population

Year	Pop.	±%
1861	1,479	—
1871	1,486	+0.5%
1881	1,641	+10.4%
1901	1,662	+1.3%
1911	1,702	+2.4%

Year	Pop.	±%
1921	1,750	+2.8%
1931	1,759	+0.5%
1936	1,746	−0.7%
1951	1,914	+9.6%
1961	1,962	+2.5%

Year	Pop.	±%
1971	1,880	−4.2%
1981	2,295	+22.1%
1991	2,873	+25.2%
2001	3,396	+18.2%

Source: Data from ISTAT
