= Lacchiarella =

- Comune
- Comune di Lacchiarella
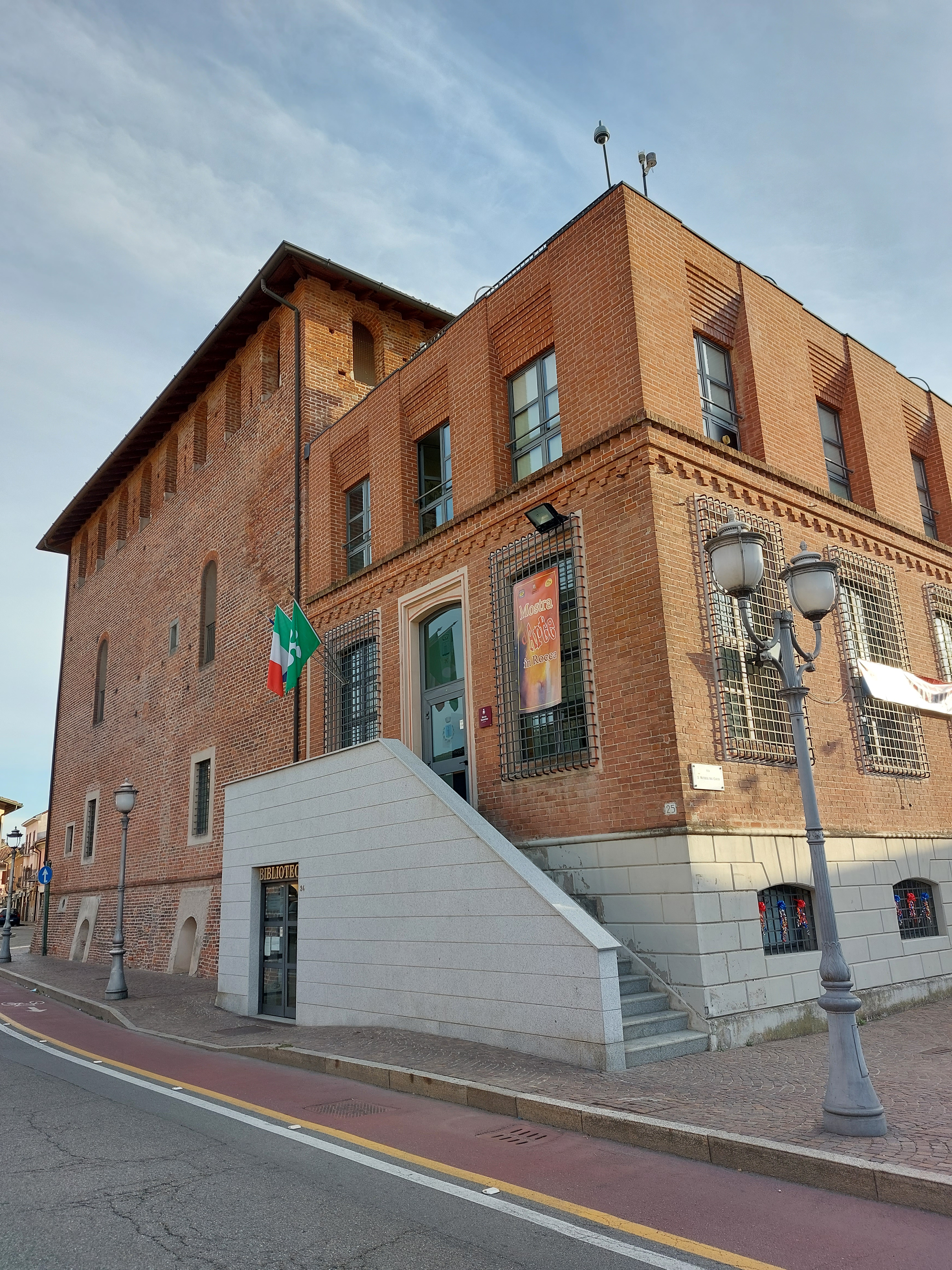
- The Castello Visconteo in Lacchiarella.

- Flag Coat of arms

- Location of Lacchiarella in Italy Lacchiarella (Lombardy)
- Coordinates: 45°19′N 9°08′E
- Country: Italy
- Region: Lombardy
- Metropolitan city: Milan (MI)
- Frazioni: Casirate Olona, Villamaggiore, Mettone

Government
  - Mayor: Antonella Violi

Area
  - Total: 24.04 km^{2} (9.28 sq mi)
- Elevation: 98 m (322 ft)

Population (31 December 2025)
  - Total: 9,131
  - Density: 379.8/km^{2} (983.7/sq mi)
- Demonym(s): Lacchiarellesi, Ciarlaschi
- Time zone: UTC+1 (CET)
  - Summer (DST): UTC+2 (CEST)
- Postal code: 20084
- Dialing code: 02
- ISTAT code: 015115
- Patron saint: Saint Mary of the Assumption
- Saint day: 15 August
- Website: Official website

Lacchiarella (Lombard: Laciaréla [latʃaˈrɛla]) is a comune (municipality) located in the Metropolitan City of Milan, which is in the italian region of Lombardy, and situated about 22 kilometres (14 mi) south of Milan.

Lacchiarella borders the following municipalities: Zibido San Giacomo, Pieve Emanuele, Basiglio, Binasco, Bornasco, Siziano, Casarile, Vidigulfo, Giussago.
