= Bornasco =

- Comune
- Comune di Bornasco
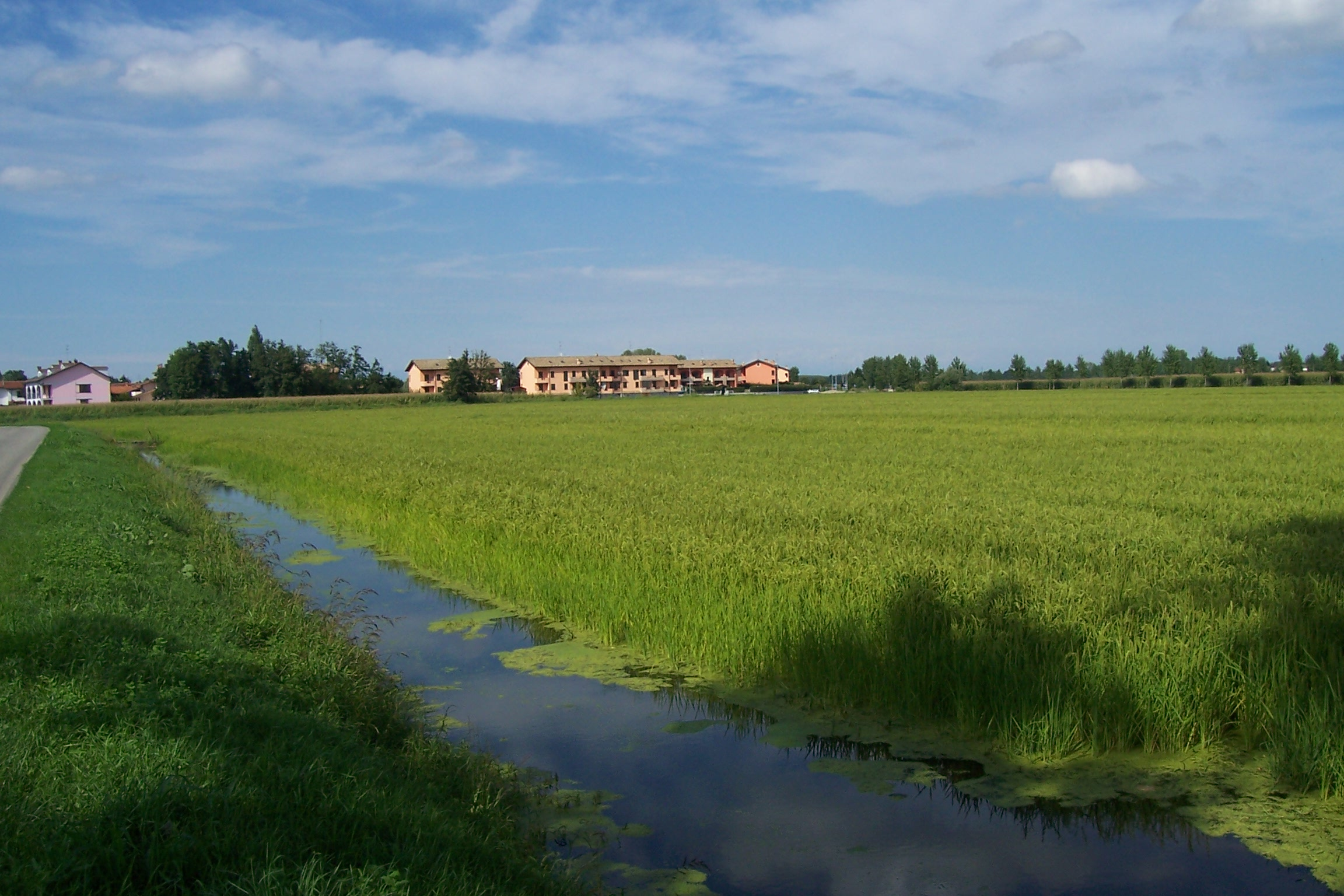
- The Olona in Bornasco.

- Location within Italy Location within Lombardy
- Coordinates: 45°16′N 9°13′E
- Country: Italy
- Region: Lombardy
- Province: Pavia (PV)
- Frazioni: Corbesate, Gualdrasco, Misano Olona, San Rocco, Settimo

Government
  - Mayor: Ettore Campari

Area
  - Total: 12.7 km^{2} (4.9 sq mi)
- Elevation: 85 m (279 ft)

Population (30 April 2017)
  - Total: 2,667
  - Density: 210/km^{2} (544/sq mi)
- Demonym: Bornaschini
- Time zone: UTC+1 (CET)
  - Summer (DST): UTC+2 (CEST)
- Postal code: 27010
- Dialing code: 0382
- Website: Official website

Bornasco is a comune (municipality) in the Province of Pavia in the Italian region Lombardy, located about 25 km south of Milan and about 11 km northeast of Pavia.

Bornasco borders the following municipalities: Ceranova, Giussago, Lacchiarella, Lardirago, San Genesio ed Uniti, Sant'Alessio con Vialone, Siziano, Vidigulfo, Zeccone.
