= Lardirago =

- Comune
- Comune di Lardirago
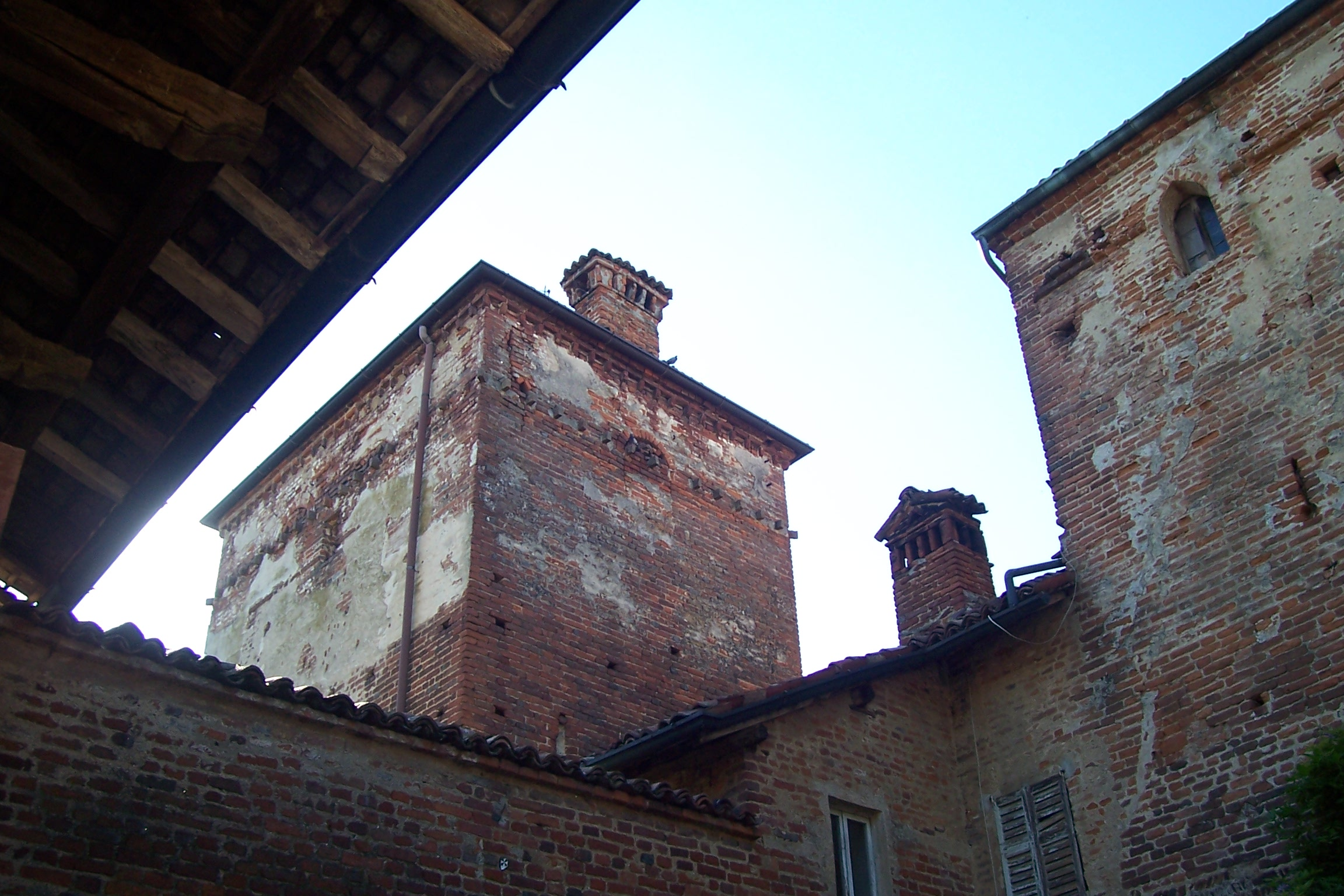
- Castle of Lardirago

- Location within Italy Location within Lombardy
- Coordinates: 45°14′N 9°14′E
- Country: Italy
- Region: Lombardy
- Province: Pavia (PV)

Government
  - Mayor: Mirella Facchina

Area
  - Total: 5.34 km^{2} (2.06 sq mi)
- Elevation: 83 m (272 ft)

Population (31 August 2017)
  - Total: 1,161
  - Density: 217/km^{2} (563/sq mi)
- Demonym: Lardiraghesi
- Time zone: UTC+1 (CET)
  - Summer (DST): UTC+2 (CEST)
- Postal code: 27016
- Dialing code: 0382
- Website: Official website

Lardirago is a comune (municipality) in the Province of Pavia in the Italian region Lombardy, located about 25 km south of Milan and about 9 km northeast of Pavia.

Lardirago borders the following municipalities: Bornasco, Ceranova, Marzano, Roncaro, Sant'Alessio con Vialone.

== Twin towns ==
Lardirago is twinned with:

- Ribeira Grande, Cape Verde
