= Marzano, Pavia =

Marzano
- Comune
- Comune di Marzano
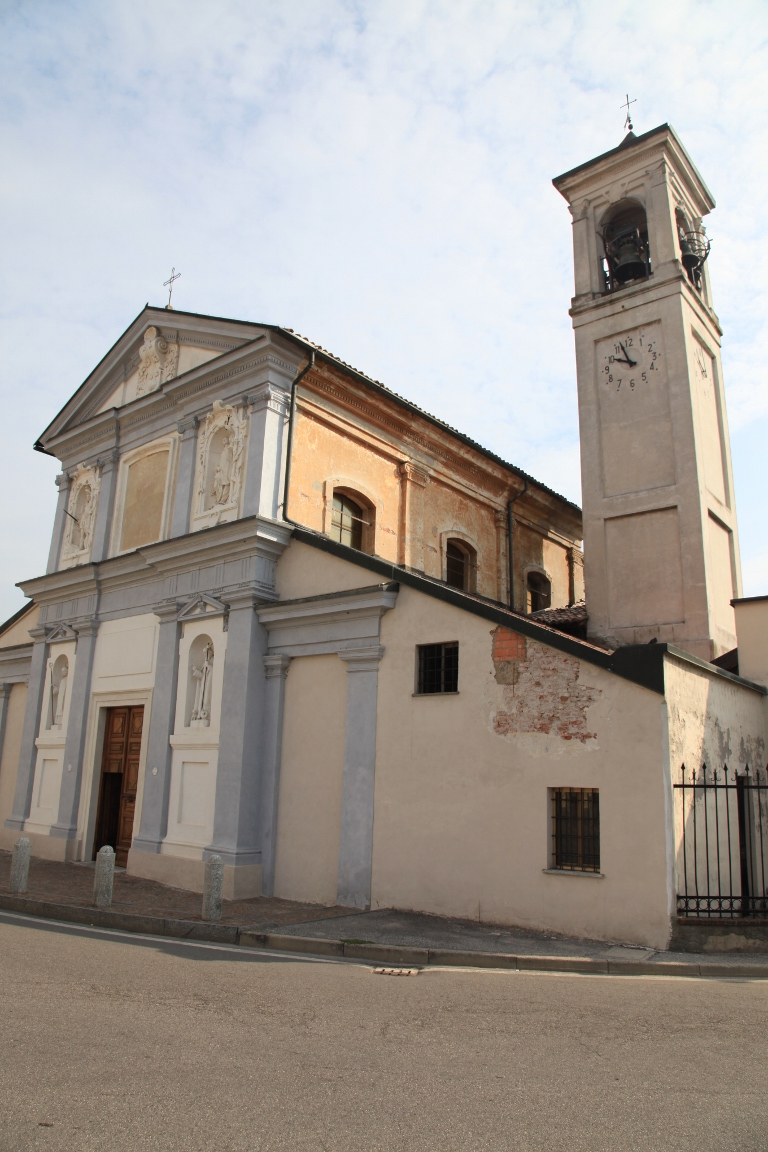

- Location within Italy Location within Lombardy
- Coordinates: 45°15′N 9°18′E
- Country: Italy
- Region: Lombardy
- Province: Pavia (PV)

Government
  - Mayor: Angelo Bargigia

Area
  - Total: 9.29 km^{2} (3.59 sq mi)
- Elevation: 78 m (256 ft)

Population (30 September 2017)
  - Total: 1,684
  - Density: 181/km^{2} (469/sq mi)
- Demonym: Marzanini
- Time zone: UTC+1 (CET)
  - Summer (DST): UTC+2 (CEST)
- Postal code: 27010
- Dialing code: 0382
- Website: Official website

Marzano is a comune (municipality) in the Province of Pavia in the Italian region Lombardy, located about 25 km southeast of Milan and about 14 km northeast of Pavia.

Marzano borders the following municipalities: Ceranova, Lardirago, Roncaro, Torre d'Arese, Torrevecchia Pia, Valera Fratta, Vidigulfo and Vistarino.
