= Agnolotti =

Italian meat-filled pasta

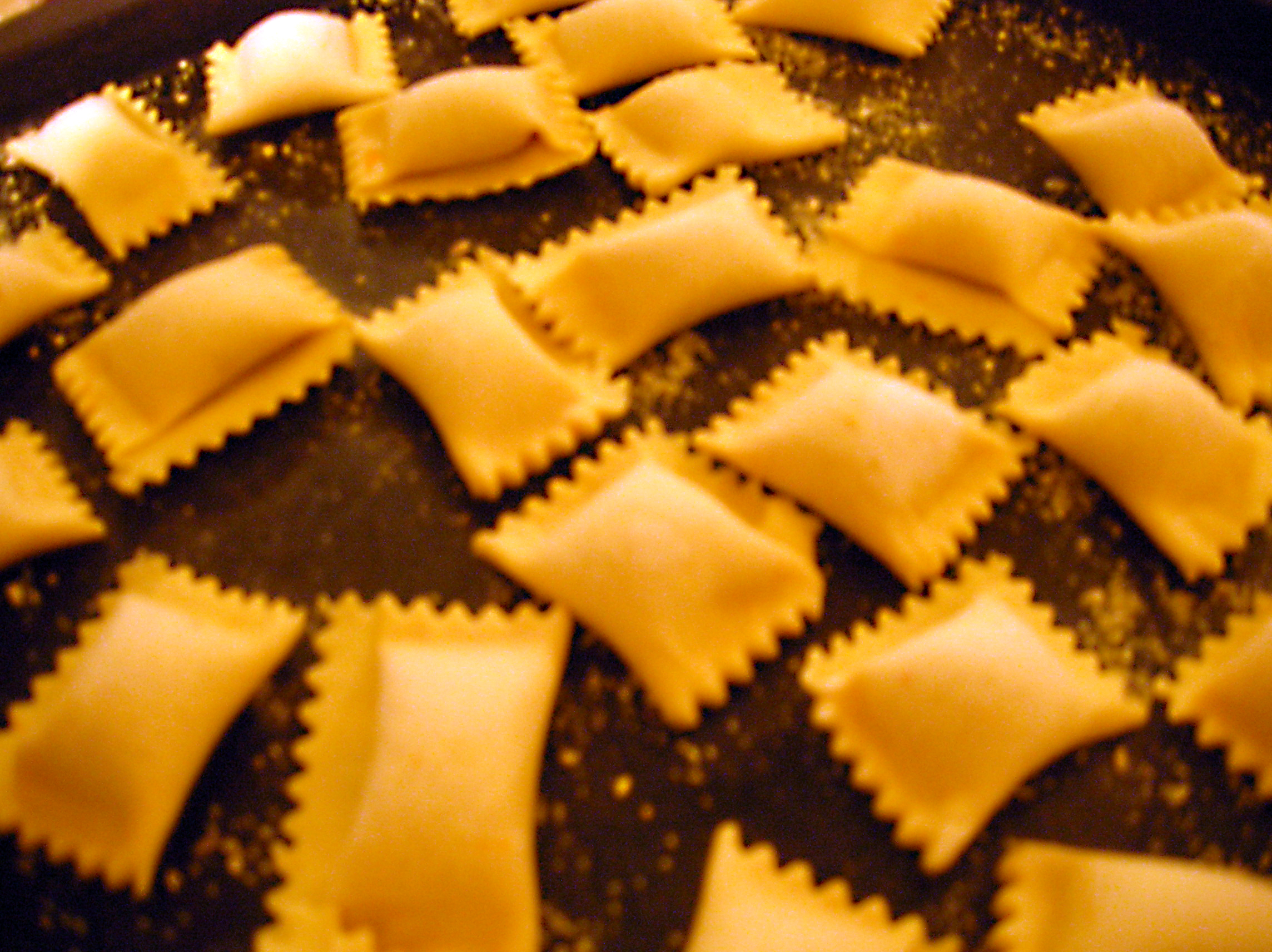
- Alternative names: Agnolotti piemontesi, agnolòt, agnellotti, langaroli, langheroli
- Type: Pasta
- Place of origin: Italy
- Region or state: Piedmont
- Main ingredients: Pasta dough, beef, vegetables

Agnolotti (Italian: [aɲɲoˈlɔtti]; Piedmontese: agnolòt, Piedmontese: [aɲʊˈlɔt]), also known as agnolotti piemontesi, is a type of stuffed pasta typical of the Piedmont region of Italy, made with small pieces of flattened dough folded over a filling of roasted meat or vegetables. Agnolotti can be di magro or di grasso depending on their filling of vegetables or meat.

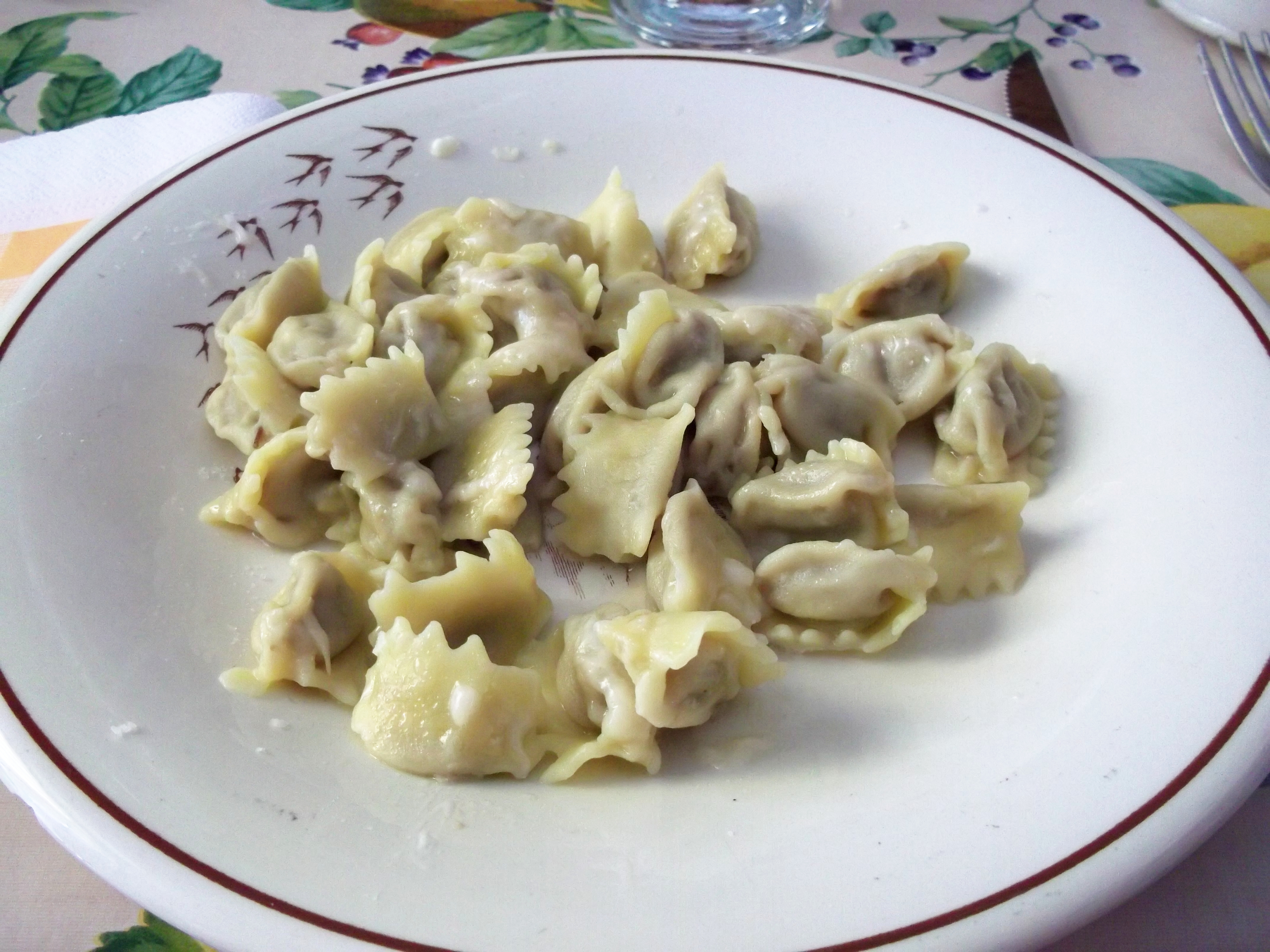
Homemade agnolotti del plin (pinched)

Although their primitive shape was semi-circular, traditionally agnolotti are of a square shape with sides of about one or two inches. However, they can also be of a smaller, rectangular shape when they are called agnolotti del plin. Plin means 'a pinch', because one pinches with thumb and forefinger between each mound of filling to close and seal the little pasta packets. Agnolotti del plin are almost always stuffed with meat.

== History ==
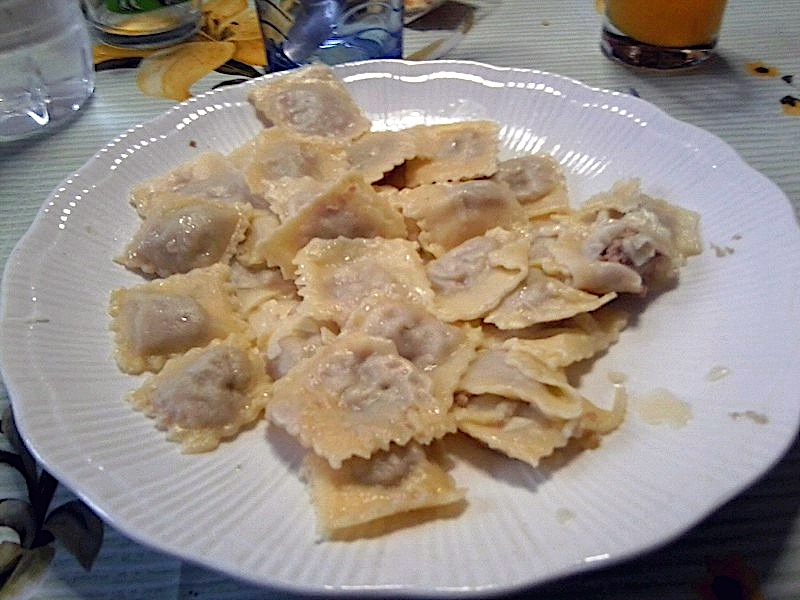
Agnolotti piemontesi alla moda di Asti

According to a legend, the origin of the name may come from a cook called Angiolino, or "Angelot", an individual from Montferrat who is said to be the inventor of the recipe.

== Variations ==
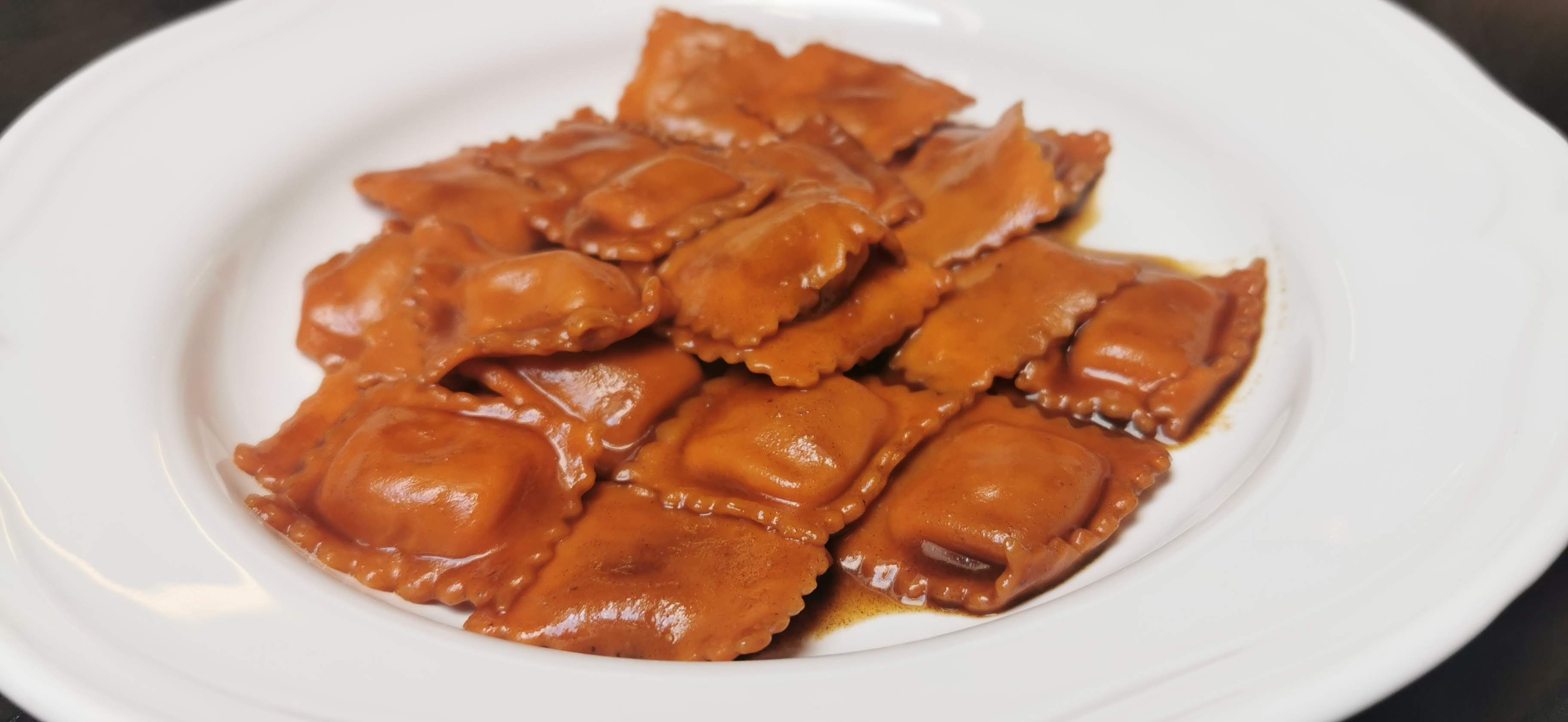
Agnolotti with roast sauce

In the historical Montferrat region of Italy, located within Piedmont, a special version of agnolotti is prepared with a donkey meat filling. Robiola is another popular ingredient in Piedmont.

Other variations:

- Agnolotti al sugo di brasato
- Agnolotti del plin
- Agnolotti di magro
- Agnolotti del plin al sugo di arrosto
- Agnolotti di pesce spada
- Agnolotti con ripieno di coniglio alla crema di porcini
- Agnolotti ripieni di salsiccia e radicchio

== See also ==
- Piedmontese cuisine
- List of pasta
- List of dumplings
- Agnolotti pavesi
