= Zeccone =

- Comune
- Comune di Zeccone
- Coat of arms

- Location within Italy Location within Lombardy
- Coordinates: 45°16′N 9°12′E
- Country: Italy
- Region: Lombardy
- Province: Pavia (PV)
- Frazioni: Villareggio

Government
  - Mayor: Terenzio Angelo Grossi

Area
  - Total: 5.5 km^{2} (2.1 sq mi)
- Elevation: 86 m (282 ft)

Population (30 April 2010)
  - Total: 1,686
  - Density: 310/km^{2} (790/sq mi)
- Demonym: Zecconesi
- Time zone: UTC+1 (CET)
  - Summer (DST): UTC+2 (CEST)
- Postal code: 27012
- Dialing code: 0382

Zeccone is a comune (municipality) in the Province of Pavia in the Italian region Lombardy, located about 20 km south of Milan and about 10 km northeast of Pavia.

Zeccone borders the following municipalities: Bornasco, Giussago, San Genesio ed Uniti.
