= Vidigulfo =

- Comune
- Comune di Vidigulfo
- Location within Italy Location within Lombardy
- Coordinates: 45°18′N 9°14′E
- Country: Italy
- Region: Lombardy
- Province: Pavia (PV)

Government
  - Mayor: Domenico Fabrizio Bertuzzi

Area
  - Total: 16.14 km^{2} (6.23 sq mi)
- Elevation: 88 m (289 ft)

Population (31 January 2015)
  - Total: 6,264
  - Density: 388.1/km^{2} (1,005/sq mi)
- Demonym: Vidigulfini
- Time zone: UTC+1 (CET)
  - Summer (DST): UTC+2 (CEST)
- Postal code: 27018
- Dialing code: 0382
- Website: Official website

Vidigulfo is a comune (municipality) in the Province of Pavia in the Italian region Lombardy, located about 20 km southeast of Milan and about 15 km northeast of Pavia.

Vidigulfo borders the following municipalities: Bornasco, Ceranova, Lacchiarella, Landriano, Marzano, Siziano, Torrevecchia Pia.
