= Borgarello =

- Comune
- Comune di Borgarello
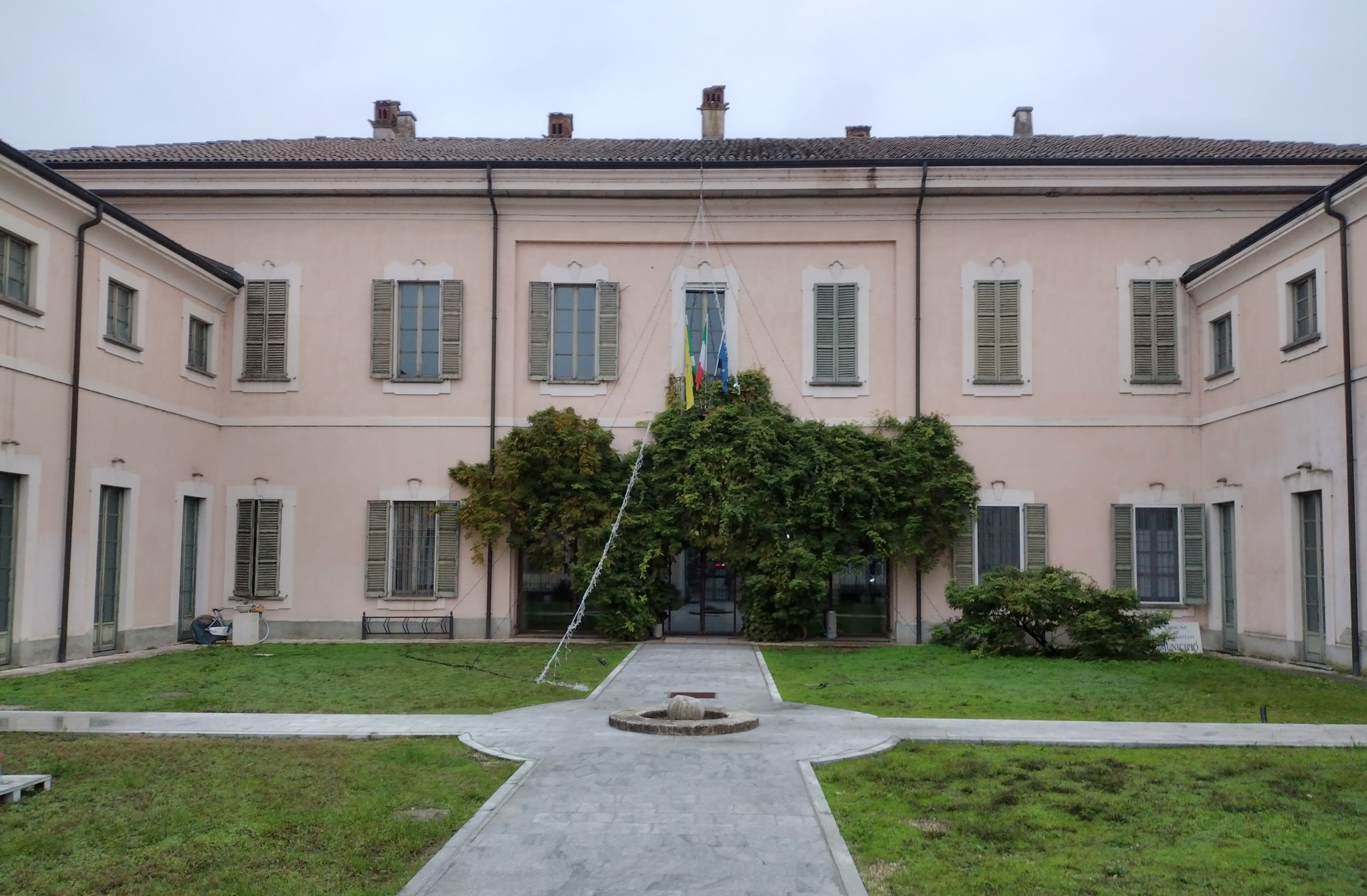
- View of Borgarello

- Location within Italy Location within Lombardy
- Coordinates: 45°14′N 9°8′E
- Country: Italy
- Region: Lombardy
- Province: Province of Pavia (PV)

Area
  - Total: 4.8 km^{2} (1.9 sq mi)

Population (Dec. 2004)
  - Total: 2,188
  - Density: 460/km^{2} (1,200/sq mi)
- Time zone: UTC+1 (CET)
  - Summer (DST): UTC+2 (CEST)
- Postal code: 27010
- Dialing code: 0382

Borgarello is a comune (municipality) in the Province of Pavia in the Italian region Lombardy, located about 25 km (16 mi) south of Milan and about 6 km (3.7 mi) north of Pavia. As of 31 December 2004, it had a population of 2,188 and an area of 4.8 km^{2} (1.9 sq mi).

Borgarello borders the following municipalities: Certosa di Pavia, Giussago, Pavia, San Genesio ed Uniti.

== History ==
During Roman times, Borgarello was crossed by the Mediolanum-Ticinum road, a Roman road connecting Mediolanum (Milan) with Ticinum, which is modern-day Pavia

In a document from 1181, it is referred to as Bulgarello. During the Visconti era, it was included in the Parco Nuovo, a large hunting estate located between the Castle of Pavia and the Certosa (Charterhouse of Pavia). After the fall of the Sforza family and the deterioration of this park, the name Parco Nuovo continued to be used to denote the administrative division of which Borgarello was a part. In the 16th century, it became a fief of the Pallavicino family, and in the 18th century, it was under the Mezzabarba family of Pavia.

In 1929, the municipality of Borgarello, along with Torre del Mangano and Torriano, formed the new municipality of Certosa di Pavia, but it regained its autonomy in 1958.

== Demographic evolution ==
Historical population

Year	Pop.	±%
1861	690	—
1871	700	+1.4%
1881	788	+12.6%
1901	758	−3.8%
1911	803	+5.9%

Year	Pop.	±%
1921	955	+18.9%
1931	992	+3.9%
1936	1,001	+0.9%
1951	995	−0.6%
1961	950	−4.5%

Year	Pop.	±%
1971	925	−2.6%
1981	855	−7.6%
1991	986	+15.3%
2001	1,609	+63.2%

Source: Data from ISTAT
