= Siziano =

- Comune
- Comune di Siziano
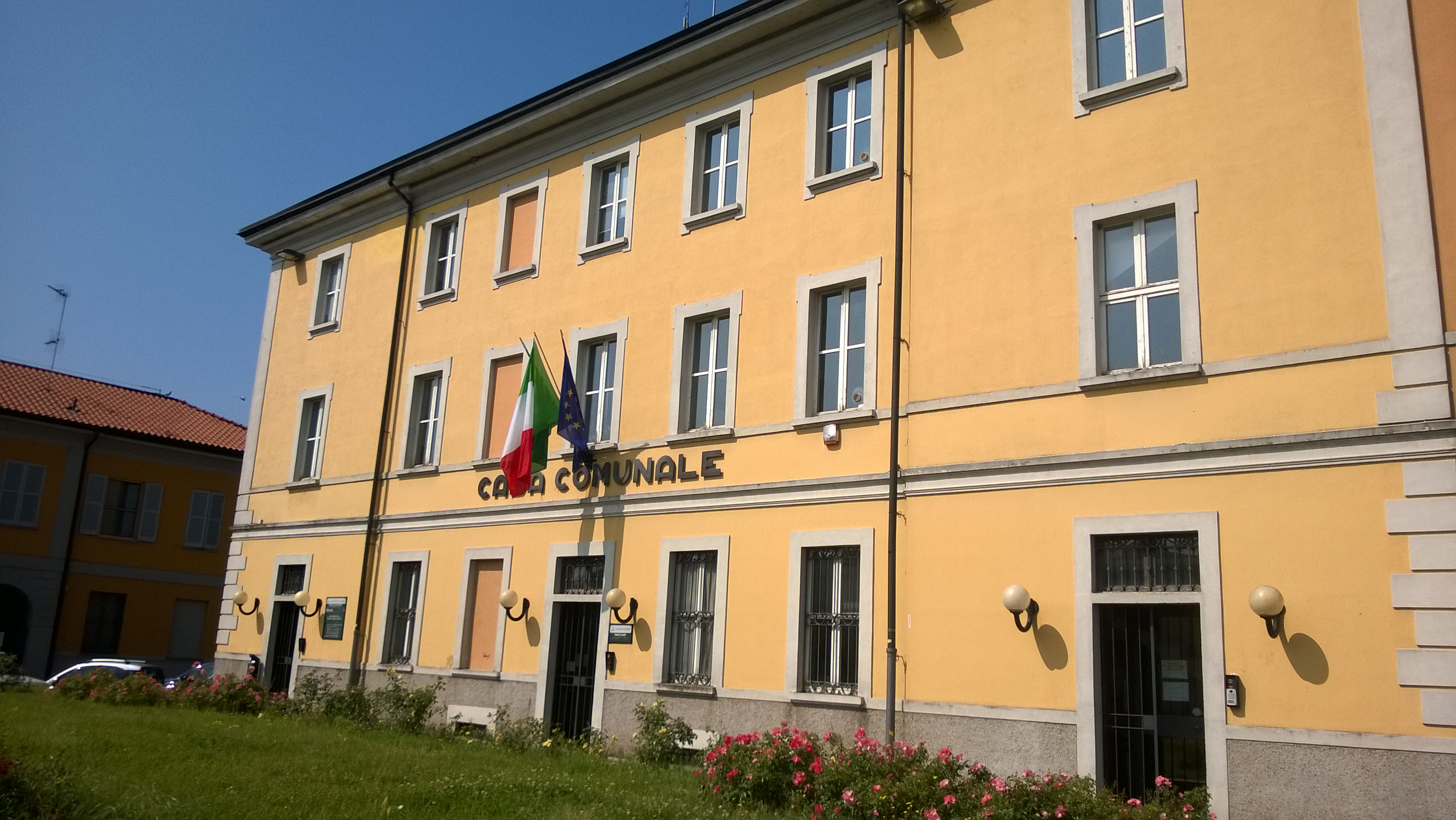

- Coat of arms

- Location within Italy Location within Lombardy
- Coordinates: 45°19′N 9°12′E
- Country: Italy
- Region: Lombardy
- Province: Pavia (PV)
- Frazioni: Bonate, Campomorto, Casatico, Gnignano

Government
  - Mayor: Matteo Pedrazzoli

Area
  - Total: 11.8 km^{2} (4.6 sq mi)

Population (December 2004)
  - Total: 5,584
  - Density: 473/km^{2} (1,230/sq mi)
- Demonym: Sizianesi
- Time zone: UTC+1 (CET)
  - Summer (DST): UTC+2 (CEST)
- Postal code: 27010
- Dialing code: 0382
- Patron saint: St. Bartholomew
- Saint day: September 9
- Website: Official website

Siziano is a comune (municipality) in the Province of Pavia in the Italian region Lombardy, located about 15 km (9.3 mi) south of Milan and about 15 km (9.3 mi) north of Pavia.

Siziano borders the following municipalities: Bornasco, Carpiano, Lacchiarella, Landriano, Locate di Triulzi, Pieve Emanuele, Vidigulfo.

== Demographic evolution ==
Historical population

Year	Pop.	±%
1861	1,665	—
1871	1,707	+2.5%
1881	1,711	+0.2%
1901	1,825	+6.7%
1911	1,858	+1.8%

Year	Pop.	±%
1921	1,921	+3.4%
1931	2,020	+5.2%
1936	2,056	+1.8%
1951	2,290	+11.4%
1961	2,411	+5.3%

Year	Pop.	±%
1971	3,003	+24.6%
1981	3,294	+9.7%
1991	4,119	+25.0%
2001	5,226	+26.9%

Source: Data from ISTAT

== Transmitter ==
At Siziano, there is a large mediumwave transmitter, which broadcasts Rai Radio 1 on 900 kHz with 600 kW. It is one of the most powerful transmitters in Italy and can be received in whole Europe at night time. As antenna two guyed mast radiators insulated against ground are used. They are 148 and 145 metres tall and situated at 45°19'54"N 9°11'59"E respectively 45°19'41"N 9°11'50"E.
