= Ceranova =

- Comune
- Comune di Ceranova
- Location within Italy Location within Lombardy
- Coordinates: 45°16′N 9°14′E
- Country: Italy
- Region: Lombardy
- Province: Province of Pavia (PV)
- Frazioni: Gioiello, San Rocco

Government
  - Mayor: Alessandro Grieco

Area
  - Total: 4.6 km^{2} (1.8 sq mi)
- Elevation: 86 m (282 ft)

Population (30 June 2017)
  - Total: 2,231
  - Density: 480/km^{2} (1,300/sq mi)
- Demonym: Ceranovesi
- Time zone: UTC+1 (CET)
  - Summer (DST): UTC+2 (CEST)
- Postal code: 27010
- Dialing code: 0382
- Website: Official website

Ceranova is a comune (municipality) in the Province of Pavia in the Italian region Lombardy, located about 25 km south of Milan and about 11 km northeast of Pavia.

Ceranova borders the following municipalities: Bornasco, Lardirago, Marzano, Vidigulfo.
