= Landriano =

- Comune
- Comune di Landriano
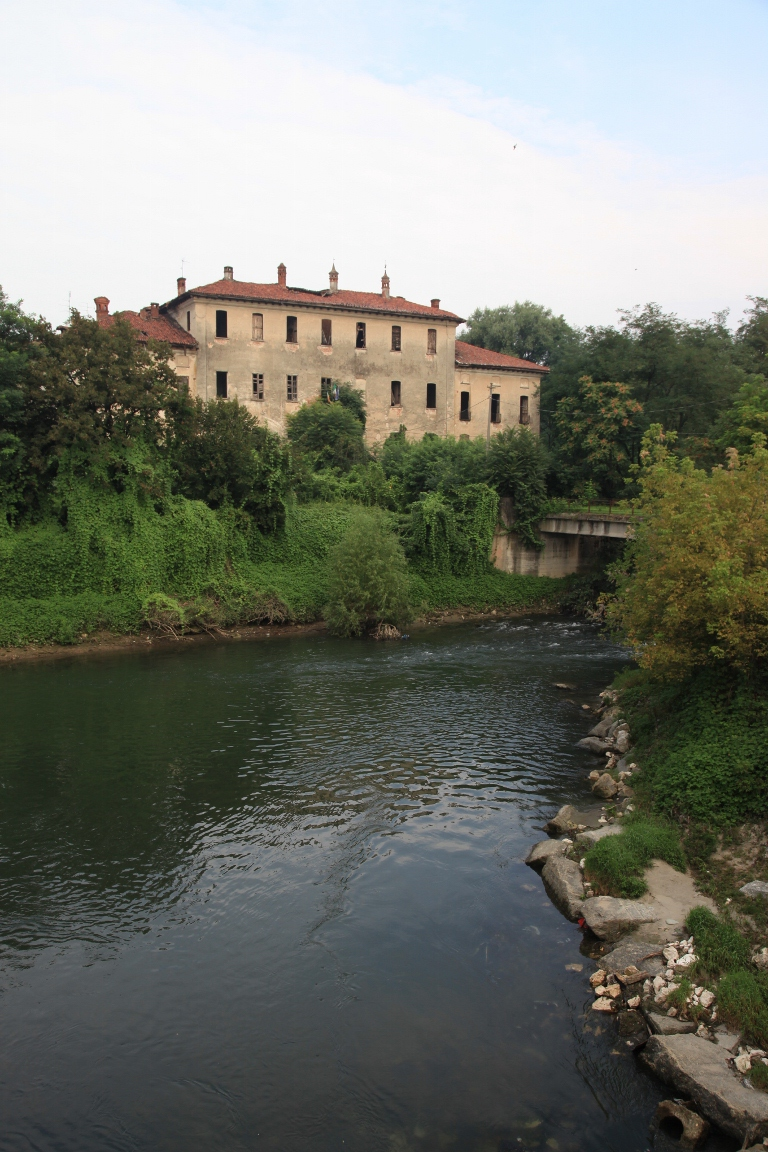

- Coat of arms

- Location within Italy Location within Lombardy
- Coordinates: 45°19′N 9°16′E
- Country: Italy
- Region: Lombardy
- Province: Pavia (PV)

Government
  - Mayor: Maria Ivana Vacchini

Area
  - Total: 15.59 km^{2} (6.02 sq mi)
- Elevation: 88 m (289 ft)

Population (31 August 2017)
  - Total: 6,384
  - Density: 409.5/km^{2} (1,061/sq mi)
- Demonym: Landrianini
- Time zone: UTC+1 (CET)
  - Summer (DST): UTC+2 (CEST)
- Postal code: 27015
- Dialing code: 0382
- Website: Official website

Landriano is a comune (municipality) in the Province of Pavia in the Italian region Lombardy, located about 20 kilometres (12 mi) southeast of Milan and about 15 kilometres (9 mi) northeast of Pavia.

Landriano borders the following municipalities: Bascapè, Carpiano, Siziano, Torrevecchia Pia and Vidigulfo. It is located on the left shore of the Lambro, which here forms an islet which is the site of the old town's castle.

In 1529 it was the location of the battle of Landriano between France and Spain.
