= Cura Carpignano =

- Comune
- Comune di Cura Carpignano
- Coat of arms

- Location within Italy Location within Lombardy
- Coordinates: 45°13′N 9°15′E
- Country: Italy
- Region: Lombardy
- Province: Pavia (PV)
- Frazioni: Borghetto, Calignano, Prado, Vimanone

Government
  - Mayor: Paolo Dolcini

Area
  - Total: 11.09 km^{2} (4.28 sq mi)
- Elevation: 78 m (256 ft)

Population (30 June 2017)
  - Total: 4,909
  - Density: 442.7/km^{2} (1,146/sq mi)
- Demonym: Curesi
- Time zone: UTC+1 (CET)
  - Summer (DST): UTC+2 (CEST)
- Postal code: 27010
- Dialing code: 0382
- Website: Official website

Cura Carpignano is a comune (municipality) in the Province of Pavia in the Italian region Lombardy, located about 30 km south of Milan and about 9 km northeast of Pavia.
