= Torrevecchia Pia =

- Comune
- Comune di Torrevecchia Pia
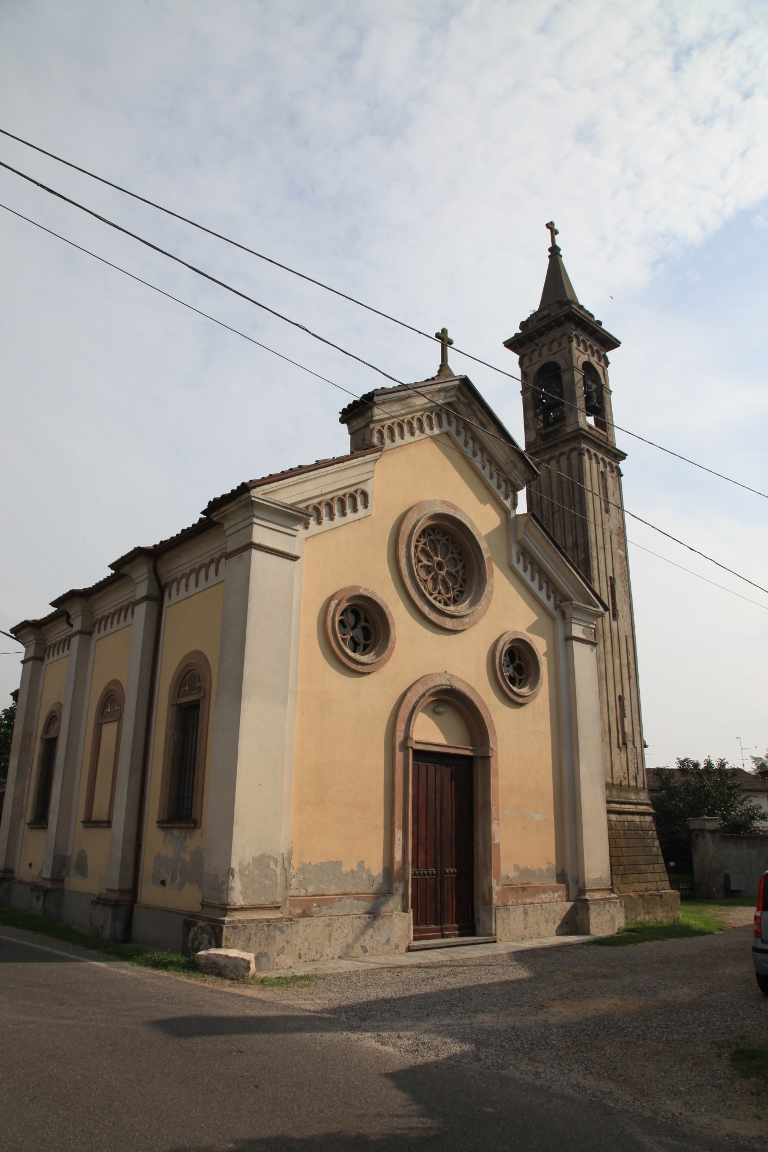

- Coat of arms

- Location within Italy Location within Lombardy
- Coordinates: 45°17′N 9°18′E
- Country: Italy
- Region: Lombardy
- Province: Pavia (PV)

Government
  - Mayor: Gerardo Manfredi

Area
  - Total: 16.3 km^{2} (6.3 sq mi)
- Elevation: 84 m (276 ft)

Population (31 December 2010)
  - Total: 3,409
  - Density: 209/km^{2} (542/sq mi)
- Demonym: Torrevecchini
- Time zone: UTC+1 (CET)
  - Summer (DST): UTC+2 (CEST)
- Postal code: 27010
- Dialing code: 0382
- Website: Official website

Torrevecchia Pia is a comune (municipality) in the Province of Pavia in the Italian region Lombardy, located about 25 km southeast of Milan and about 15 km northeast of Pavia.

Torrevecchia Pia borders the following municipalities: Bascapè, Landriano, Marzano, Valera Fratta and Vidigulfo.

== History ==
Torre Vecchia, as the community was known since the 11th century, was initially part of the feud of Bascapè, belonging to the homonymous family, then passing in the 16th century to the fief of Landriano, belonging to the Taverna. In the eighteenth century it was no longer in a fiefdom. Since the thirteenth century, if not earlier, it belonged to the Milan area, and precisely to the civil parish church of San Giuliano. In 1786 it was included in the province of Pavia. In 1863 it took the name of Torrevecchia Pia. In 1872, following Italian unification, the municipalities of Vigonzone and Zibido al Lambro were aggregated to Torrevecchia Pia.
