= Giussago =

- Comune
- Comune di Giussago
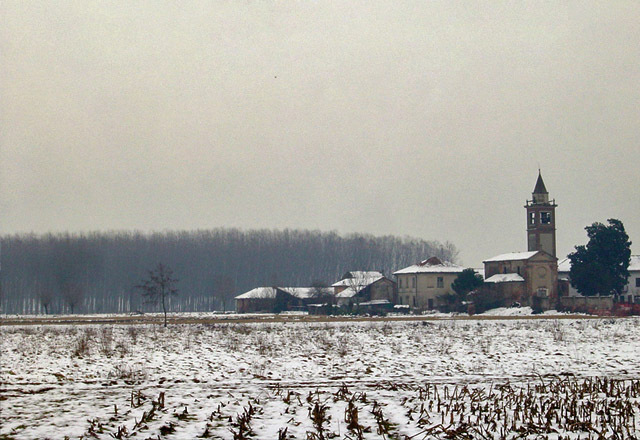

- Coat of arms

- Location within Italy Location within Lombardy
- Coordinates: 45°17′N 9°9′E
- Country: Italy
- Region: Lombardy
- Province: Province of Pavia (PV)

Area
  - Total: 24.8 km^{2} (9.6 sq mi)

Population (Dec. 2004)
  - Total: 4,053
  - Density: 163/km^{2} (423/sq mi)
- Time zone: UTC+1 (CET)
  - Summer (DST): UTC+2 (CEST)
- Postal code: 27010
- Dialing code: 0382
- Website: Official website

Giussago is a comune (municipality) in the Province of Pavia in the Italian region Lombardy, located about 20 km (12 mi) south of Milan and about 11 km (6.8 mi) north of Pavia. As of 31 December 2004, it had a population of 4,053 and an area of 24.8 km^{2} (9.6 sq mi).

Giussago borders the following municipalities: Borgarello, Bornasco, Casarile, Certosa di Pavia, Lacchiarella, Rognano, San Genesio ed Uniti, Vellezzo Bellini, Zeccone.

Giussago, known in the 15th century as 'Iussagum' was formed by aggregating the many small municipalities of the area. This union took place between the end of the 19th century and the beginning of the 20th. Even today in the town of Giussago there are less than one third of the total population of the municipality.

The 13 parishes (frazione) of Giussago are:

- Baselica Bologna
- Carpignago
- Cascina Maggiore
- Casatico
- Guinzano
- Molino dei Protti
- Moriago
- Nivolto
- Novedo
- Scaccabarozzi
- Stazione Certosa
- Turago Bordone
- Villanova

== Demographic evolution ==
Historical population

Year	Pop.	±%
1861	3,361	—
1871	3,565	+6.1%
1881	3,443	−3.4%
1901	3,511	+2.0%
1911	3,331	−5.1%

Year	Pop.	±%
1921	3,362	+0.9%
1931	3,222	−4.2%
1936	3,259	+1.1%
1951	3,510	+7.7%
1961	3,402	−3.1%

Year	Pop.	±%
1971	3,261	−4.1%
1981	3,244	−0.5%
1991	3,367	+3.8%
2001	3,915	+16.3%

Source: Data from ISTAT
