= Sant'Alessio con Vialone =

- Comune
- Comune di Sant'Alessio con Vialone
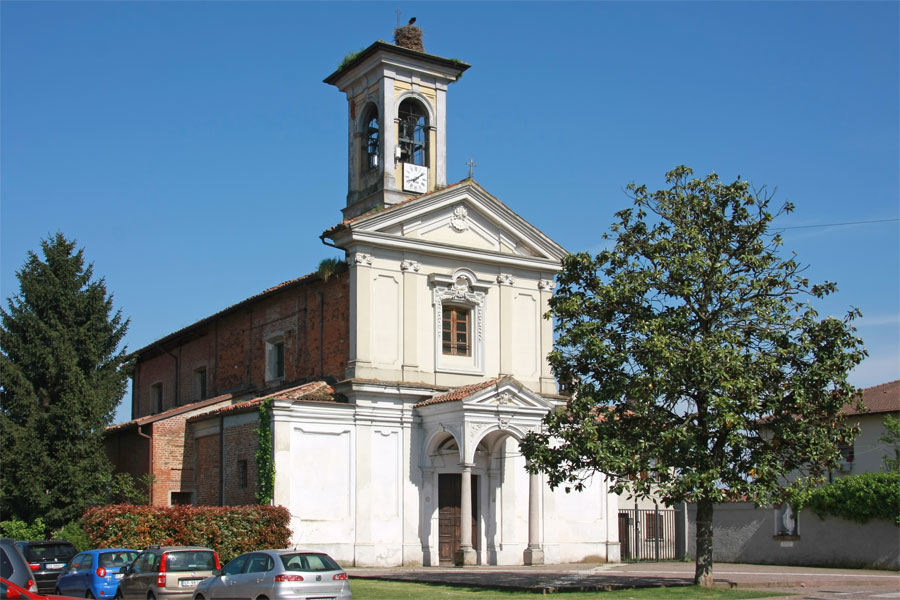
- Parish church.

- Coat of arms

- Location within Italy Location within Lombardy
- Coordinates: 45°13′N 9°15′E
- Country: Italy
- Region: Lombardy
- Province: Pavia (PV)
- Frazioni: Ca' de' Zetti, Vialone

Government
  - Mayor: Alberto Rusmini

Area
  - Total: 6.56 km^{2} (2.53 sq mi)
- Elevation: 83 m (272 ft)

Population (31 December 2014)
  - Total: 951
  - Density: 145/km^{2} (375/sq mi)
- Demonym: Santalessini
- Time zone: UTC+1 (CET)
  - Summer (DST): UTC+2 (CEST)
- Postal code: 27016
- Dialing code: 0382
- Website: Official website

Sant'Alessio con Vialone is a comune (municipality) in the Province of Pavia in the Italian region Lombardy, located about 30 km south of Milan and about 9 km northeast of Pavia.

Sights include the eponymous castle and the annexed natural preserve.
